= Hill GH1 =

Formula One car used in 1975

Hill GH1 (Lola T371)
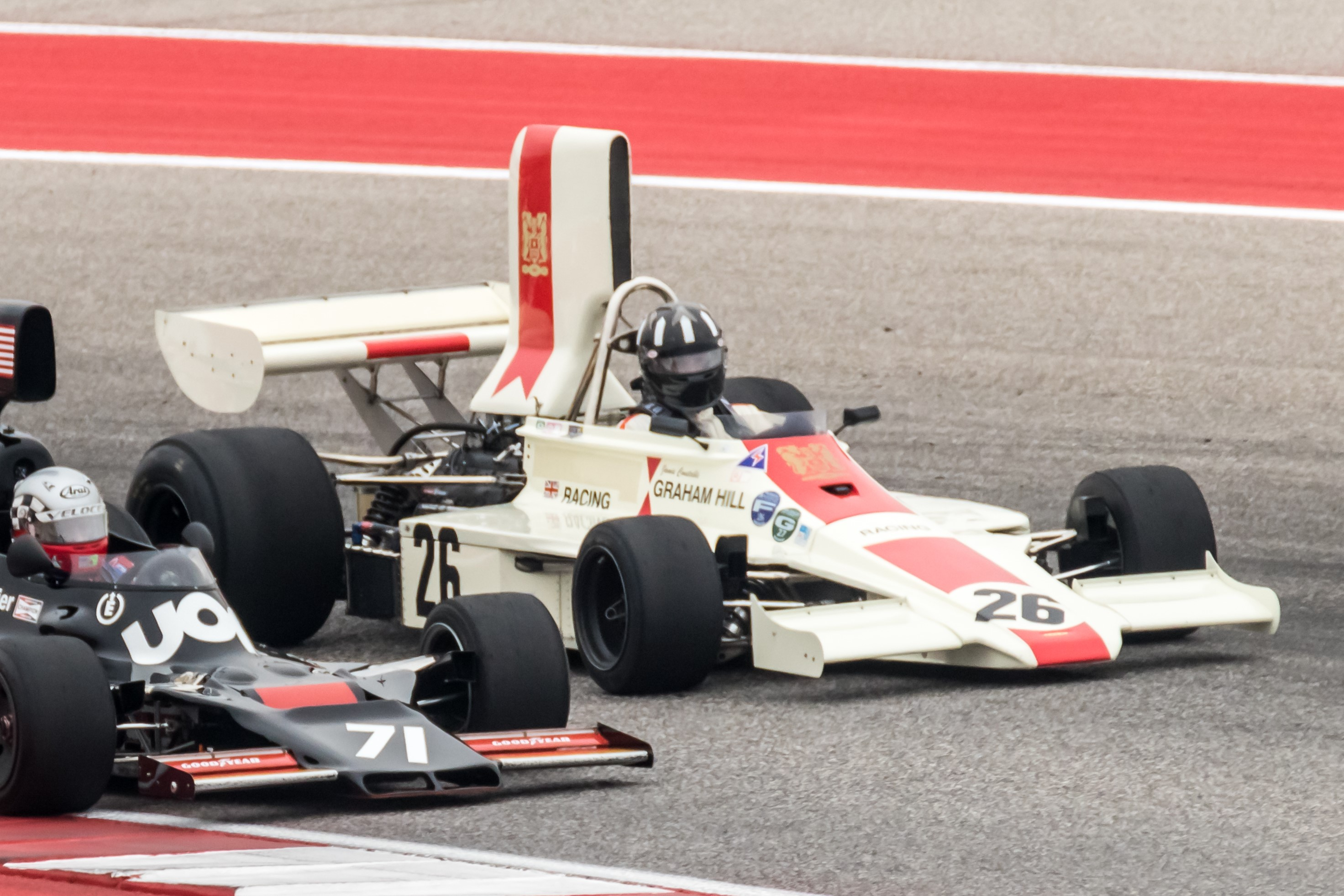
- A Hill GH1 in 2017
- Category: Formula One
- Constructor: Lola/Hill
- Designer: Andy Smallman
- Predecessor: Lola T370
- Successor: Hill GH2

Technical specifications
- Chassis: Aluminium monocoque, with engine as a fully stressed member.
- Suspension (front): Double wishbones, coil springs over dampers, anti-roll bar
- Suspension (rear): Single top links, twin lower links, twin trailing arms, coil springs over dampers, anti-roll bar
- Axle track: 1,626 millimetres (64.0 in) (Front); 1,600 millimetres (63 in) (Rear)
- Wheelbase: 2,573 millimetres (101.3 in)
- Engine: Ford Cosworth DFV 2,993 cc (182.6 cu in) 90° V8, naturally aspirated, mid-mounted.
- Transmission: Hewland TL 200 5-speed manual
- Power: 485 brake horsepower (362 kW) @ 10,600 rpm 363 newton-metres (268 lbf⋅ft) @ 7,000 rpm
- Weight: 603 kg (1,329 lb)
- Fuel: Esso
- Lubricants: Esso
- Tyres: Goodyear

Competition history
- Notable entrants: Embassy Racing With Graham Hill
- Notable drivers: (Germany) Rolf Stommelen (United Kingdom) Graham Hill (United Kingdom) Tony Brise (Australia) Alan Jones
- Debut: 1975 South African Grand Prix (as Lola T371)
Races	Wins	Poles	F/Laps
12	0	0	0
- Unless otherwise stated, all data refer to Formula One World Championship Grands Prix only.

The Hill GH1 was a Formula One car used by Embassy Hill during the 1975 Formula One season. It was designed by Andy Smallman. The car was initially designated as the Lola T371, but when Smallman left Lola to work full-time for Embassy Hill it was renamed as the Hill GH1. GH1 cars participated in 12 World Championship Grands Prix in 1975, with 21 entries in total using six different drivers. Two points finishes yielded 11th place in the World Constructors' Championship, with three points.

== Racing history ==
The car was not ready for a Formula One appearance until the third race of the season, the South African Grand Prix, when Rolf Stommelen finished seventh on the car's debut. At the Spanish Grand Prix, Graham Hill did not drive so François Migault took the second car alongside Stommelen. Stommelen led the race until the rear wing on his car broke, sending him into the barrier, ironically at the point that the Embassy Hill mechanics had worked on it. He bounced off it and back into the road, hitting the barrier across the way, and flying over it. Five spectators were killed by Stommelen's car with the driver suffering a broken leg, a broken wrist and two cracked ribs. Migault finished 10th of those still running when the race was stopped but was 11 laps behind, and was officially not classified.

As a result of the accident, the grid was staggered and in addition, would be restricted to just 18 cars for the subsequent Monaco Grand Prix. This last change affected Graham Hill's chance to qualify, the five-time Monaco winner had practice problems and failed to qualify by 0.377 seconds. Tony Brise replaced Hill, and Migault returned to replace Stommelen, for the Belgian Grand Prix. Brise, on his debut, gained a fourth-row start but spun at the chicane and retired shortly afterwards (lap 18) with piston failure. Migault retired with Suspension failure on lap 58.

Vern Schuppan drove the second Hill alongside Brise for the Swedish Grand Prix. Brise was showing little respect for his elders, overtaking Mark Donohue and Ronnie Peterson and challenging championship leader Emerson Fittipaldi. Then his gearbox jammed in fourth and he was re-passed by Donohue, but in his third Grand Prix, gained his first World Championship point and Graham Hill's first as a constructor. It would prove the only point of Brise's F1 career. Schuppan Retired with Transmission failure on lap 48.

Alan Jones drove the second Hill alongside Brise for four races. The first was the Dutch Grand Prix when Brise finished seventh and Jones 13th. At the French Grand Prix, Brise finished seventh and Jones 16th. Prior to the British Grand Prix Graham Hill announced his retirement as a driver after 17 seasons and 176 races to concentrate on running the Embassy Hill team. Jones finished 10th and Brise 15th despite him, Wilson Fittipaldi (Fittipaldi), Dave Morgan (Surtees), John Nicholson (Lyncar), Brian Henton, (Lotus), Carlos Pace (Brabham), Jody Scheckter (Tyrrell) and James Hunt (Hesketh) going off at Club Corner and the race being red flagged. The German Grand Prix saw the Hill team's best result with Jones 5th but Brise retired through accident. Stommelen returned for the rain-shortened Austrian Grand Prix where he finished 16th and Brise 15th. At the Italian Grand Prix Brise pleased the Embassy Hill team by gaining a third-row spot. but both he and Stommelen retired with accidents. The United States Grand Prix was the final race for Brise and the Embassy Hill team, which only entered Brise who retired through accident on lap five.

== Embassy Hill air crash ==
On the evening of 29 November 1975, Hill was piloting a Piper Aztec light aircraft from France to London. His passengers were team manager Ray Brimble, driver Tony Brise, designer Andy Smallman and mechanics Terry Richards and Tony Alcock. They were returning from Paul Ricard where they had been testing the Hill GH2 being prepared for 1976. They were due to land at Elstree Airfield before onward travel to London to attend a party. Shortly before 10pm, the plane hit trees beside a golf course at Arkley in thick fog. In the ensuing crash and explosion, everyone on board was killed. As Embassy Hill now only consisted of the deputy team manager and two mechanics, it was impossible to continue, and so the team closed down.

== Complete Formula One World Championship results ==
(key)

Year	Entrants	Engines	Drivers	Tyres	1	2	3	4	5	6	7	8	9	10	11	12	13	14	Points	WCC
1975	Embassy Racing With Graham Hill	Ford Cosworth DFV; 3.0 V8		G	ARG	BRA	RSA	ESP	MON	BEL	SWE	NED	FRA	GBR	GER	AUT	ITA	USA	3	11th
1975	Embassy Racing With Graham Hill	Ford Cosworth DFV; 3.0 V8	Rolf Stommelen	G			7	Ret								16	Ret		3	11th
1975	Embassy Racing With Graham Hill	Ford Cosworth DFV; 3.0 V8	François Migault	G				NC		Ret									3	11th
1975	Embassy Racing With Graham Hill	Ford Cosworth DFV; 3.0 V8	Graham Hill	G					DNQ										3	11th
1975	Embassy Racing With Graham Hill	Ford Cosworth DFV; 3.0 V8	Tony Brise	G						Ret	6	7	7	15	Ret	15	Ret	Ret	3	11th
1975	Embassy Racing With Graham Hill	Ford Cosworth DFV; 3.0 V8	Vern Schuppan	G							Ret								3	11th
1975	Embassy Racing With Graham Hill	Ford Cosworth DFV; 3.0 V8	Alan Jones	G								13	16	10	5				3	11th

== Non-Championship results ==
(key)

Year	Entrant	Engine	Driver	Tyres	1	2	3
1975	Embassy Racing With Graham Hill	Ford Cosworth DFV		G	ROC	INT	SUI
1975	Embassy Racing With Graham Hill	Ford Cosworth DFV	Rolf Stommelen	G	9		12
1975	Embassy Racing With Graham Hill	Ford Cosworth DFV	Graham Hill	G		11	
