= Lola T370 =

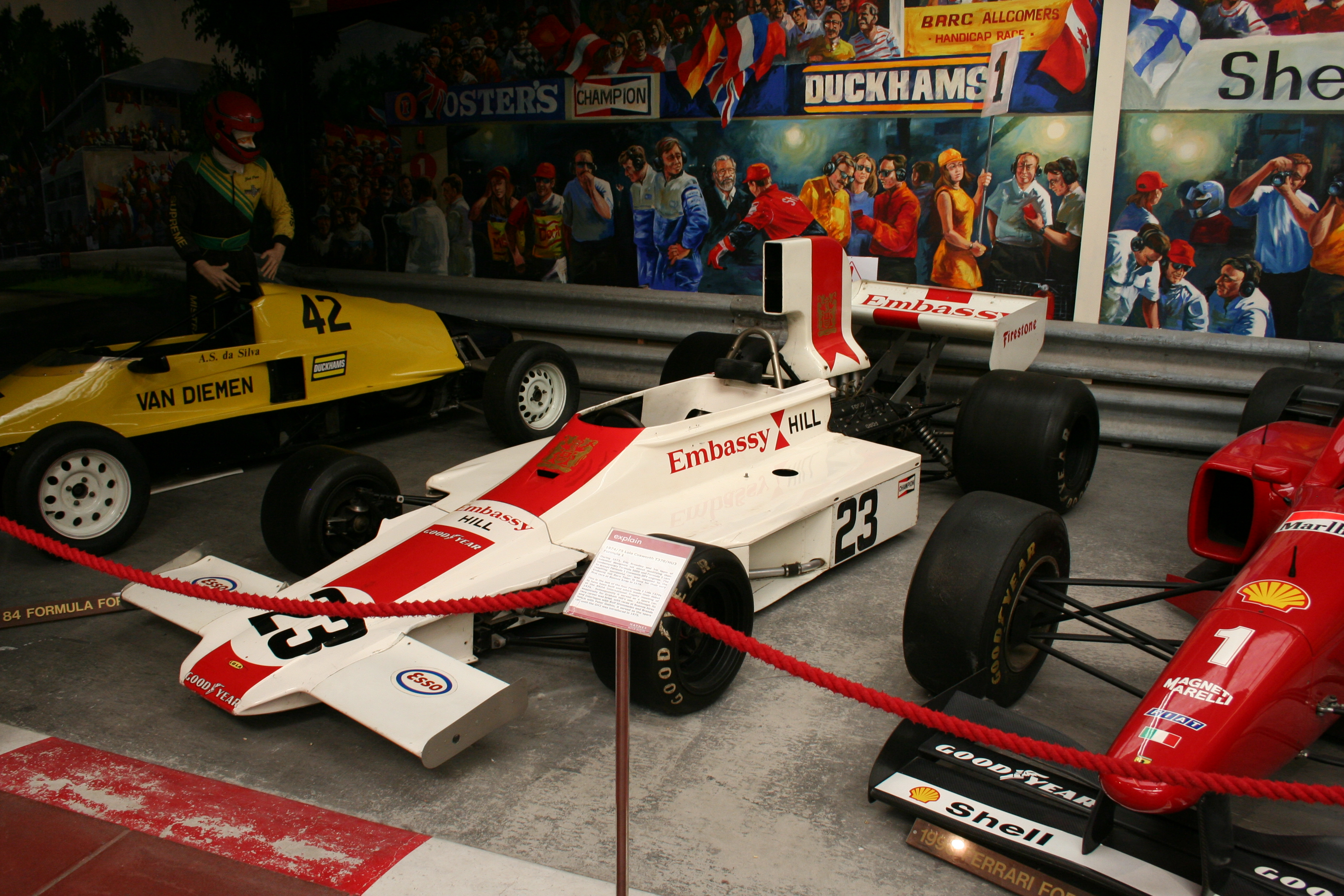
- The Lola T370 of the 1974 season displayed at Haynes International Motor Museum
- Category: Formula One
- Constructor: Lola
- Designer: Andy Smallman
- Successor: Lola T371

Technical specifications
- Chassis: Aluminium monocoque, with engine as a fully stressed member.
- Suspension (front): double wishbones, coil springs over dampers, anti-roll bar
- Suspension (rear): single top links, twin lower links, twin trailing arms, coil springs over dampers, anti-roll bar
- Engine: Ford Cosworth DFV 2,993 cc (182.6 cu in) 90° V8, naturally aspirated, mid-mounted.
- Transmission: Hewland FG 400 5-speed
- Lubricants: Shell (1974); Esso (1975)
- Tyres: Firestone (1974); Goodyear (1975)

Competition history
- Notable entrants: Embassy Racing With Graham Hill
- Notable drivers: (United Kingdom) Graham Hill (United Kingdom) Guy Edwards (United Kingdom) Peter Gethin (Germany) Rolf Stommelen
- Debut: 1974 Argentine Grand Prix
Races	Wins	Poles	F/Laps
17	0	0	0
- Unless otherwise stated, all data refer to Formula One World Championship Grands Prix only.

The Lola T370 was a Formula One car designed by Andy Smallman and used by Embassy Hill in the 1974 season and the early part of the 1975 season. After an unsuccessful 1973 with a customer Shadow DN1, the Embassy Hill team commissioned its own cars from Lola. The T370 was largely based on Formula 5000 designs, and looked similar to Lola's F5000 cars, although it sported an extremely large airbox. Embassy Hill had two cars for Graham Hill and Guy Edwards. The car was tested well before the end of 1973 in readiness for the January start to the 1974 season.

== Racing history ==
=== 1974 ===
The first race of the season was the Argentine Grand Prix, where Hill qualified 17th, although Edwards was on the back row of the grid. In the race, Hill was running tenth when his engine failed with a few laps remaining while Edwards finished 11th, two laps down on the winner Denny Hulme. In Brazil, Edwards qualified 25th and last, over two seconds slower than his nearest rival Richard Robarts, and Hill qualified 21st. The race was rain shortened and Hill finished 11th after Edwards retired on lap three with chassis problems. At the South African Grand Prix, Embassy Hill entered only one car, for Hill, who qualified 18th and finished 12th.

As the European season began, Edwards returned for the Spanish Grand Prix but narrowly failed to qualify while Hill started 19th, although the T370's engine failed at half-distance. In Belgium, Edwards outqualified Hill for the first time, starting 21st and 29th respectively. Both cars finished a race for the first time as Hill finished eighth (two laps down) and Edwards 12th (three laps down). At Monaco, Hill qualified 19th and Edwards 24th, but the race proved to be the most successful yet, the team narrowly missing out on their first Championship points with Hill in seventh and Edwards eighth, again two and three laps down respectively. The team went one better in Sweden after starting 15th and 18th, with a point for Hill as he finished sixth (the last point of his career), with Edwards seventh. Both cars were only one lap adrift of winner Jody Scheckter. Edwards again outqualified Hill at the Dutch Grand Prix as they started 14th and 19th, but the race ended in retirement for both cars, Hill with gearbox failure and Edwards with fuel system failure. In France Edwards and Hill qualified poorly, only 20th and 21st of the 22 starters, and Hill finished 13th and Edwards 15th.

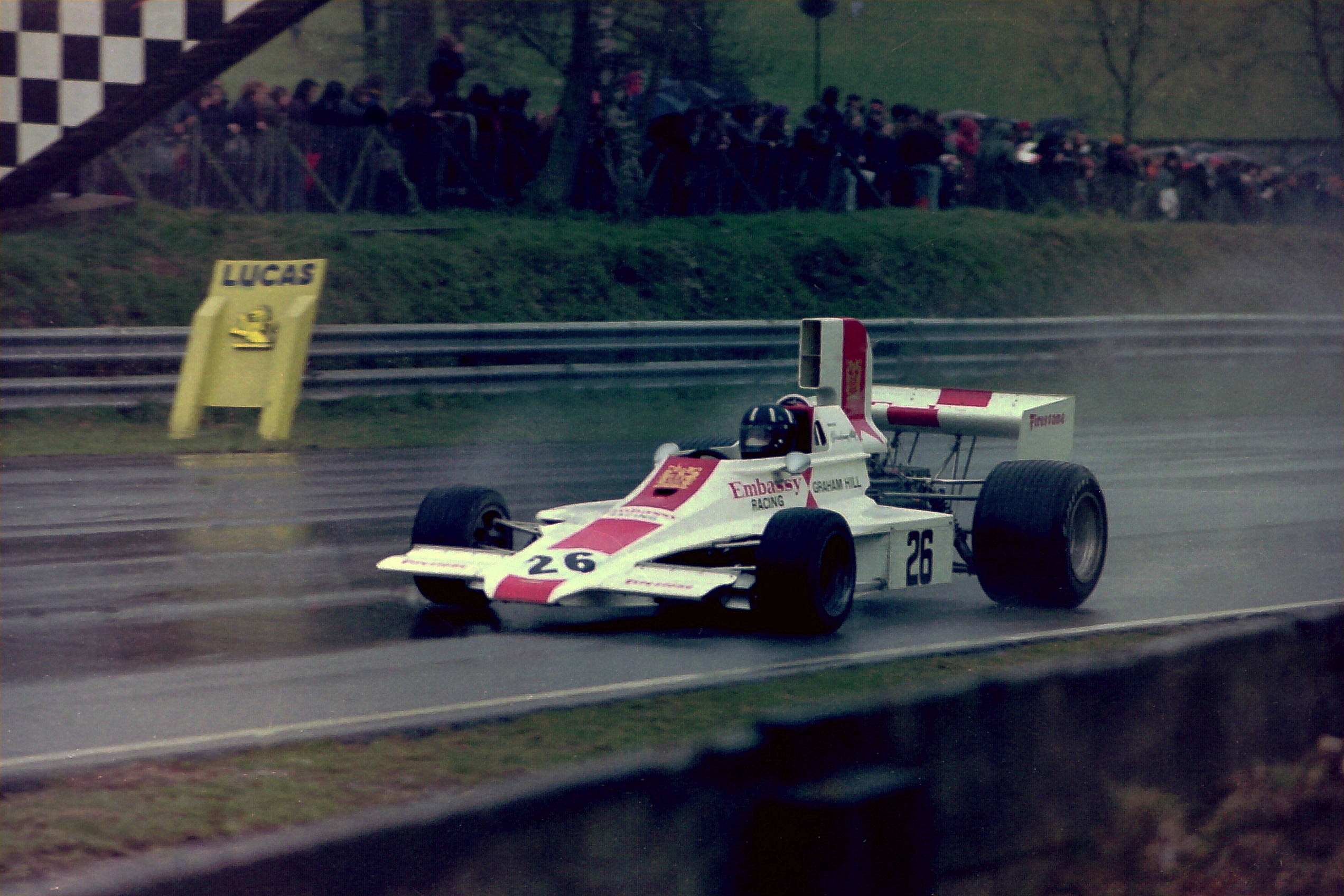
Graham Hill at the 1974 Race of Champions.

During the British Grand Prix weekend, after the first qualifying session, Edwards broke his wrist in a Formula 5000 accident and the team replaced him with countryman Peter Gethin. Gethin outqualified Hill (21st and 22nd) although he retired on the first lap with physical problems while Hill went on to finish 13th. Edwards returned for the German Grand Prix but struggled and failed to qualify while Hill started 20th and finished ninth.

Edwards's wrist had not properly healed, so Rolf Stommelen replaced him for the remainder of the season. Stommelen qualified well for the Austrian Grand Prix in 13th with Hill down in 21st, but the German suffered a puncture and had an accident while Hill finished 12th. In Italy Stommelen again outpaced Hill as they started 14th and 21st, but his suspension failed at half-distance while Hill went on to finish eighth, just one lap down on the winner Ronnie Peterson. Heading over to North America for the last two rounds, Stommelen qualified and finished 11th at the Canadian Grand Prix with Hill starting 20th and finishing 14th. For the final race of the 1974 season, the United States Grand Prix, Stommelen again outqualified Hill (21st and 24th), but Hill brought his T370 home in eighth while Stommelen struggled with the car, finishing 12th and last, five laps adrift of the winner Carlos Reutemann.

In the World Drivers' Championship, Hill was classified eighth with one point and Lola finished 12th in the Constructors' Championship, also with one point. Hill was the only one of the team's four drivers to score a point with the T370.

=== 1975 ===
Embassy Hill ran the T370 until the Lola T371 (later renamed the Hill GH1) was ready, so both Hill and Stommelen drove the T370 for the first two races of the season. At the Argentine Grand Prix, Stommelen and Hill qualified 19th and 21st respectively, and the German finished 13th with Hill 10th. At the Brazilian Grand Prix, Hill outqualified Stommelen for the only time during the lifespan of the T370, qualifying 20th to Stommelen's 23rd. Hill finished 12th with Stommelen 14th.

At the third race of the season, the South African Grand Prix, Stommelen drove the new T371 while Hill continued with the T370. However, he had an accident in practice and could not qualify for the race, thus Brazil was the last race for the T370 with the Embassy Hill team as two GH1 cars were available for the Spanish Grand Prix, the T371 having been renamed by that time. During qualifying for the Monaco Grand Prix, Hill (the team's sole entrant) struggled to qualify the GH1 and made another attempt in a T370 but was unable to qualify that car either. Hill subsequently retired from driving and the T370 made no further appearances at Grands Prix, although it was an unused spare car on a few occasions throughout the rest of the season.

== Complete Formula One World Championship results ==
(key)

Year	Entrant	Engine	Tyres	Drivers	1	2	3	4	5	6	7	8	9	10	11	12	13	14	15	Points	WCC
1974	Embassy Racing With Graham Hill	Ford Cosworth DFV; 3.0 V8	F		ARG	BRA	RSA	ESP	BEL	MON	SWE	NED	FRA	GBR	GER	AUT	ITA	CAN	USA	1	12th
1974	Embassy Racing With Graham Hill	Ford Cosworth DFV; 3.0 V8	F	Graham Hill	Ret	11	12	Ret	8	7	6	Ret	13	13	9	12	8	14	8	1	12th
1974	Embassy Racing With Graham Hill	Ford Cosworth DFV; 3.0 V8	F	Guy Edwards	11	Ret		DNQ	12	8	7	Ret	15	DNS	DNQ					1	12th
1974	Embassy Racing With Graham Hill	Ford Cosworth DFV; 3.0 V8	F	Peter Gethin										Ret						1	12th
1974	Embassy Racing With Graham Hill	Ford Cosworth DFV; 3.0 V8	F	Rolf Stommelen												Ret	Ret	11	12	1	12th
1975	Embassy Racing With Graham Hill	Ford Cosworth DFV; 3.0 V8	G		ARG	BRA	RSA	ESP	MON	BEL	SWE	NED	FRA	GBR	GER	AUT	ITA	USA		-	-
1975	Embassy Racing With Graham Hill	Ford Cosworth DFV; 3.0 V8	G	Graham Hill	10	12	DNQ		DNQ											-	-
1975	Embassy Racing With Graham Hill	Ford Cosworth DFV; 3.0 V8	G	Rolf Stommelen	13	14														-	-

== Non-Championship results ==
(key)

Year	Entrant	Engine	Tyres	Drivers	1	2	3
1974	Embassy Racing With Graham Hill	Ford Cosworth DFV	F		PRE	ROC	INT
1974	Embassy Racing With Graham Hill	Ford Cosworth DFV	F	Graham Hill		Ret	Ret
1974	Embassy Racing With Graham Hill	Ford Cosworth DFV	F	Guy Edwards			9
