= Embassy Hill =

British Formula One team/constructor

Embassy Racing With Graham Hill
- Full name: Embassy Racing With Graham Hill
- Base: United Kingdom
- Founder(s): Graham Hill
- Noted drivers: (United Kingdom) Graham Hill (United Kingdom) Tony Brise (Australia) Alan Jones (Germany) Rolf Stommelen

Formula One World Championship career
- First entry: 1973 Spanish Grand Prix
- Races entered: 41
- Constructors: Shadow-Ford; Lola-Ford; Hill-Ford
- Drivers' Championships: 0
- Race victories: 0
- Pole positions: 0
- Fastest laps: 0
- Final entry: 1975 United States Grand Prix

Hill as a Formula One chassis constructor
Formula One World Championship career
- Entrants: Embassy Hill
- First entry: 1975 Spanish Grand Prix
- Last entry: 1975 United States Grand Prix
- Races entered: 11
- Race victories: 0
- Constructors' Championships: 0
- Drivers' Championships: 0
- Pole positions: 0
- Fastest laps: 0

Embassy Racing With Graham Hill, commonly abbreviated to Embassy Hill, was a short-lived Formula One team started by two-time Formula One World Champion Graham Hill. The team debuted in 1973 with a customer Shadow DN1 car, and began racing as a constructor with its own chassis in 1975. The team had limited success in three seasons of racing, but everything was cut short by the death of Hill, Tony Brise and some of the team's top personnel in the crash of a light aircraft in the autumn before the 1976 season. The team was sponsored by Imperial Tobacco's Embassy cigarette brand and ran under various names during its time.

== History ==
=== 1972–1973 ===
Embassy Racing With Graham Hill first came into being when Graham Hill decided to leave his previous team, Brabham, unhappy with the atmosphere there. He announced in late 1972 he was starting his own team, acting as owner and driver. Setting up shop in a warehouse based on an industrial estate in Hanworth, West London, Hill formed a small team of around 20 engineers and mechanics. Securing sponsorship from Embassy, Hill started operating a team with cars purchased from Shadow. Things did not go well that year: the team's best finish was ninth at Zolder, Hill being the last finisher of nine cars (having started 23rd of 23 cars).

=== 1974 ===
The chassis for 1974 were bought from Lola, and designated as the Lola T370. Graham Hill drove throughout the season and scored a point at the 1974 Swedish Grand Prix, but this was to be the team's only point that season. The second car was driven by Guy Edwards, and later Peter Gethin and Rolf Stommelen.

=== 1975 ===
The T370 was still being used at the beginning of the 1975 season, until the team's new car was ready. The new car for 1975 was initially designated as the Lola T371, but when designer Andy Smallman left Lola to work full-time for Embassy Hill it was renamed the Hill GH1. Smallman's design drew heavily from the design of previous year's Lola cars.

Unfortunately, the second race of the GH1 at the 1975 Spanish Grand Prix was marred by the collapse of Rolf Stommelen's rear wing mounting, which pitched his car into the crowd and killed four people. Stommelen was injured in the accident and did not return until the second half of the season. He had been leading the race comfortably before the crash.

After failing to qualify at the 1975 Monaco Grand Prix, a race he had won five times, Hill no longer drove the cars himself, and his driving role was taken over by Tony Brise. Brise, considered a rising star, finished sixth in the 1975 Swedish Grand Prix and qualified sixth for the 1975 Italian Grand Prix.

Alan Jones took over the second car for most of the races that Stommelen missed; Jones finished fifth place in the 1975 German Grand Prix.

François Migault and Vern Schuppan were also behind the wheel of the second Hill that year.

==== Hill GH2 ====
The GH2 was the first Formula One car that Andy Smallman designed from scratch specifically for Graham Hill's team, and it was intended for use in the 1976 World Championship season. It was intended to replace the previous model, the Hill GH1, which had started life as the Lola T371. The GH2 used the ubiquitous Cosworth DFV engine, and featured a much smaller and streamlined chassis which resembled the Brabham BT44 and McLaren M23. Tony Brise began testing in the late summer of 1975 at Silverstone, and the times indicated the team could hope for a successful season. During the final test session at Paul Ricard in November 1975, the GH2 was performing well, being much faster than the GH1 and set up changes had made the car easy to drive. The test successful, the team packed up and flew back to England.

After the deaths of Graham Hill, Tony Brise, Andy Smallman and Ray Brimble on 29 November 1975, the GH2 project came to a halt. However, a GH2 was still built and is now in a British automobile museum.

== Embassy Hill plane crash ==
On the evening of 29 November 1975 Graham Hill was piloting an Embassy Hill Piper Aztec light aircraft from France to London. His passengers were team manager Ray Brimble, team driver Tony Brise, designer Andy Smallman and mechanics Terry Richards and Tony Alcock. They were returning from Circuit Paul Ricard where they had been testing the Hill GH2 car being prepared for 1976. They were due to land at Elstree Airfield before onward travel to London to attend a party. Shortly before 10pm the plane hit trees beside a golf course at Arkley in thick fog. In the ensuing crash and fire everyone on board was killed. As the team now only consisted of Allan Turner, the deputy team manager, and two mechanics it was impossible to continue. Most of the team's assets were purchased by Walter Wolf and merged with those of Hesketh Racing and Williams to form Wolf's new team.

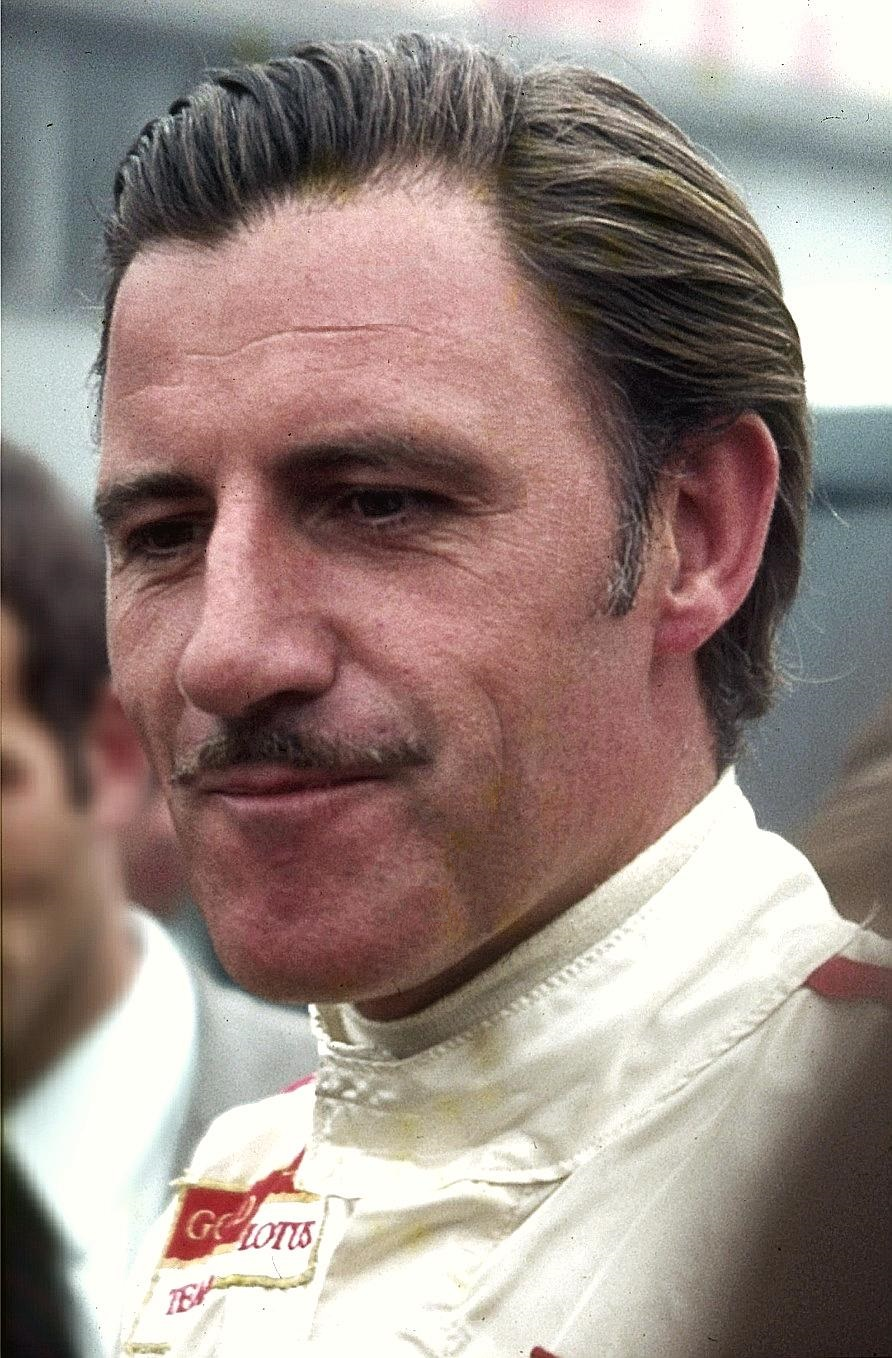
Graham Hill

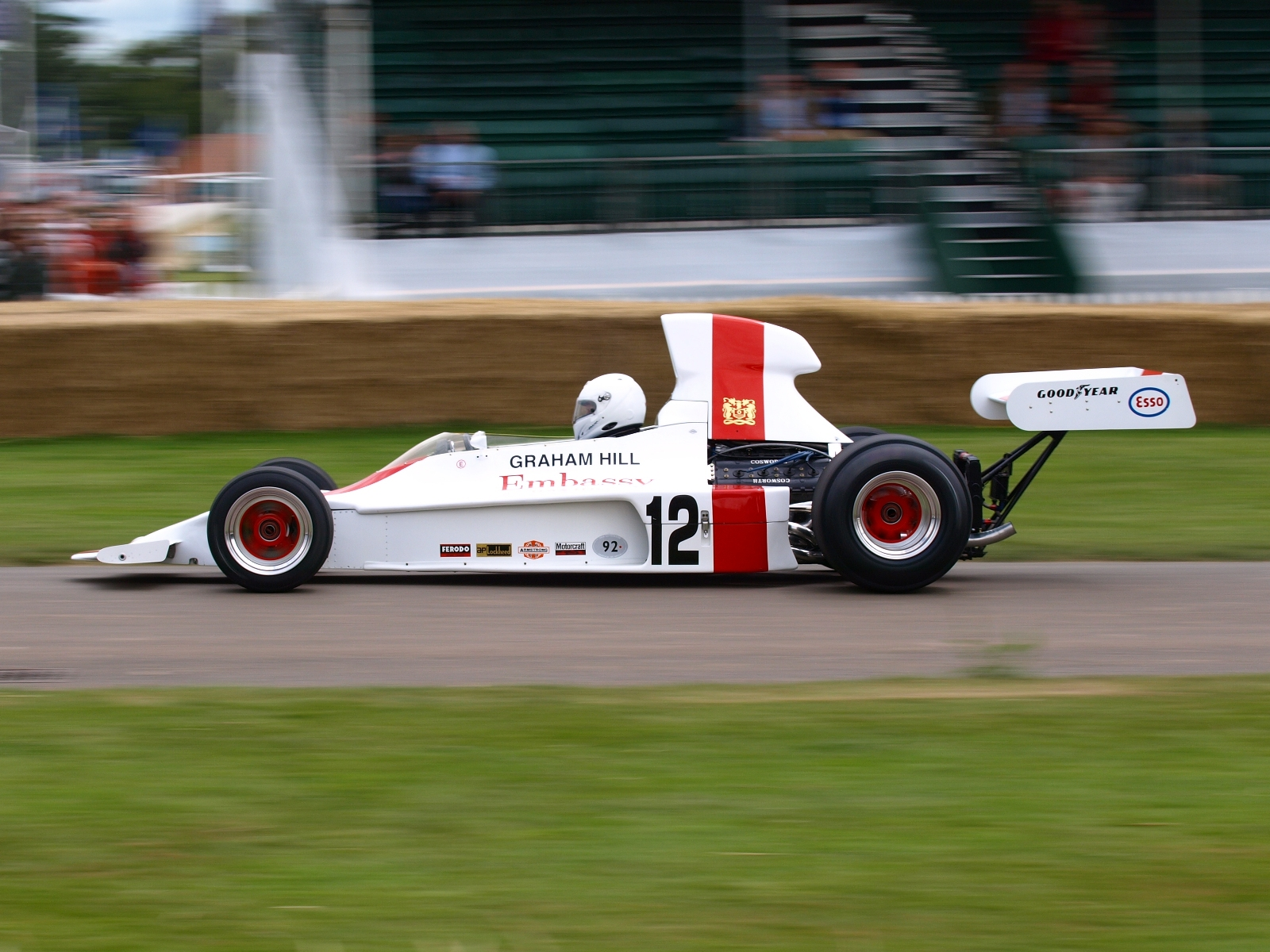
Hill's 1973 Shadow DN1 being demonstrated at the 2008 Goodwood Festival of Speed.

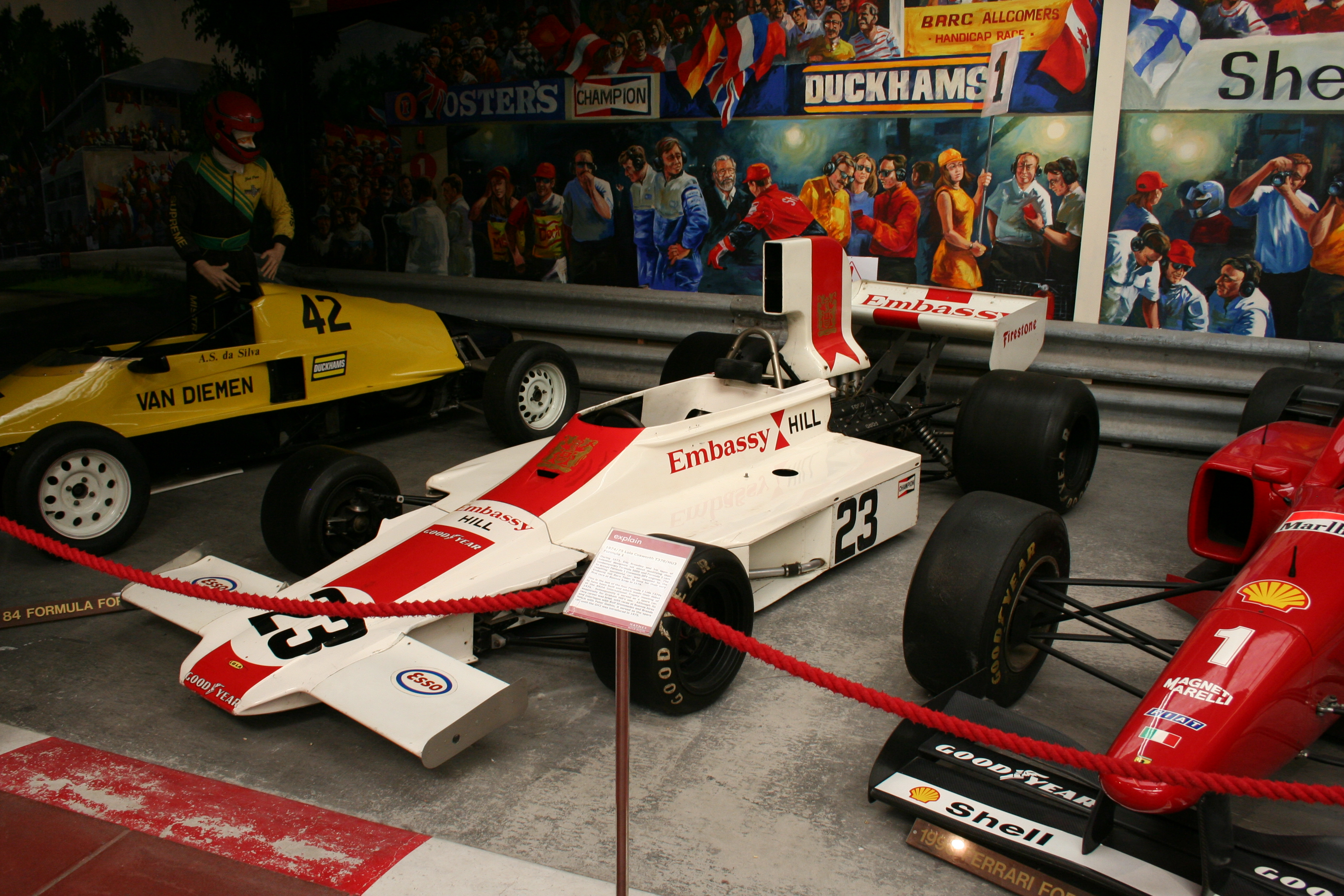
The Lola T370 of the 1974 season displayed at Haynes International Motor Museum

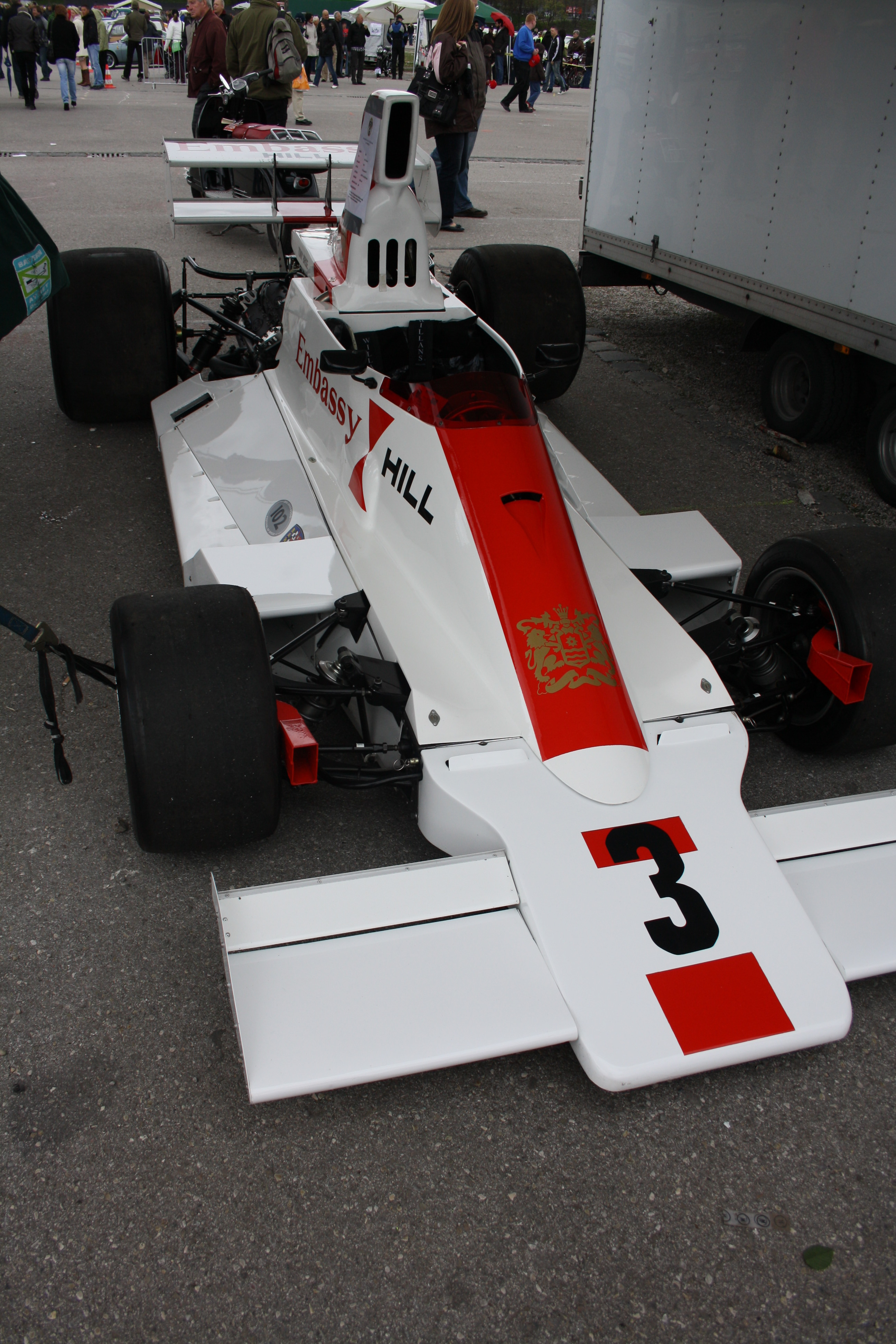
The Hill GH2

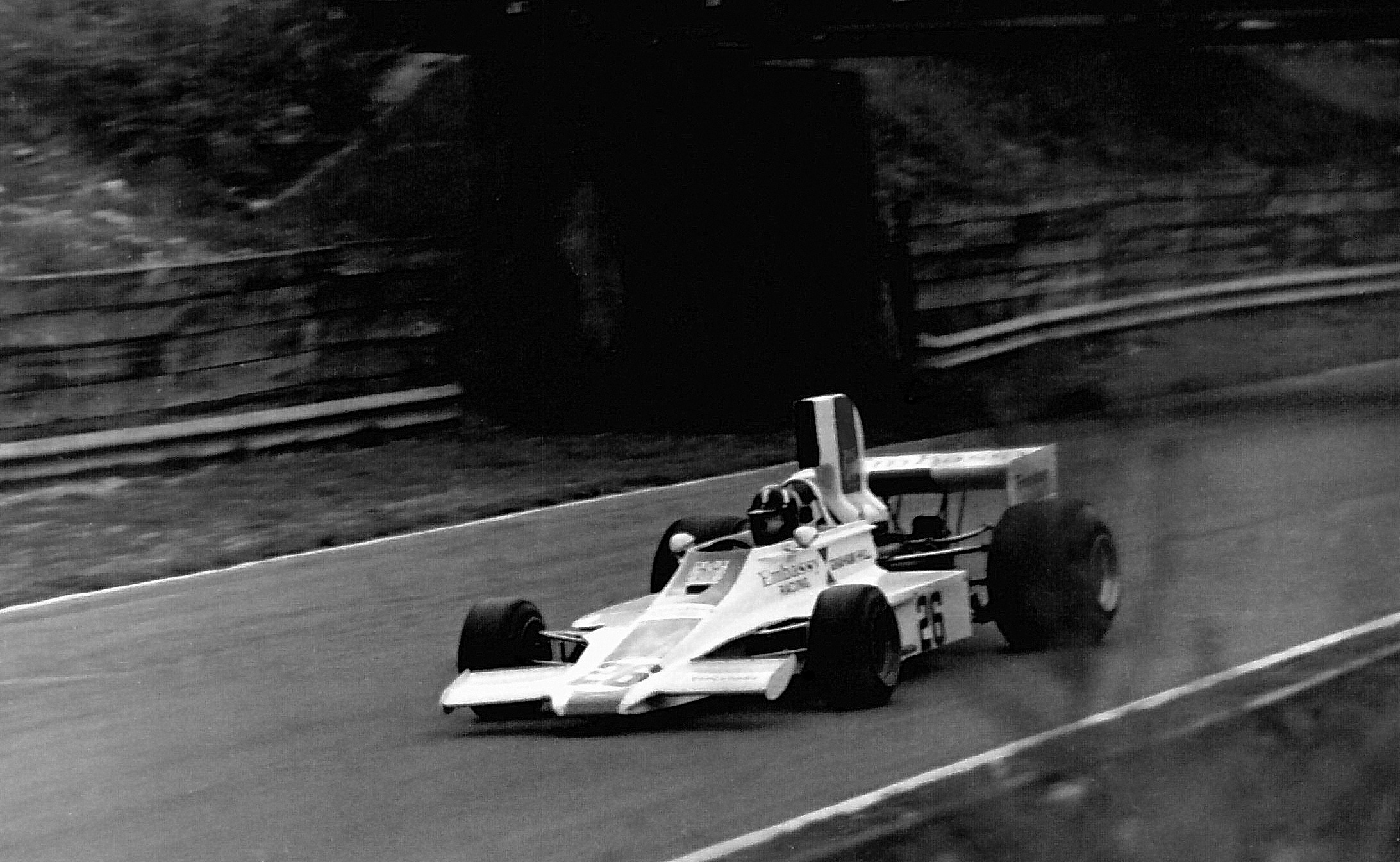
Hill driving the Lola T370 at the 1974 British Grand Prix

== Complete Formula One results ==
(key)

Year	Chassis	Engines	Tyres	Drivers	1	2	3	4	5	6	7	8	9	10	11	12	13	14	15	Points	WCC
1973	Shadow; DN1	Ford V8	G		ARG	BRA	RSA	ESP	BEL	MON	SWE	FRA	GBR	NED	GER	AUT	ITA	CAN	USA	-	-
1973	Shadow; DN1	Ford V8	G	(United Kingdom) Graham Hill				Ret	9	Ret	Ret	10	Ret	NC	13	Ret	14	16	13	-	-
1974	Lola; T370	Ford V8	F		ARG	BRA	RSA	ESP	BEL	MON	SWE	NED	FRA	GBR	GER	AUT	ITA	CAN	USA	-	-
1974	Lola; T370	Ford V8	F	(United Kingdom) Graham Hill	Ret	11	12	Ret	8	7	6	Ret	13	13	9	12	8	14	8	-	-
1974	Lola; T370	Ford V8	F	(United Kingdom) Guy Edwards	11	Ret		DNQ	12	8	7	Ret	15	DNS	DNQ					-	-
1974	Lola; T370	Ford V8	F	(United Kingdom) Peter Gethin										Ret						-	-
1974	Lola; T370	Ford V8	F	(Germany) Rolf Stommelen												Ret	Ret	11	12	-	-
1975		Ford V8	G		ARG	BRA	RSA	ESP	MON	BEL	SWE	NED	FRA	GBR	GER	AUT	ITA	USA		-	-
1975	Lola T370	Ford V8	G	(United Kingdom) Graham Hill	10	12	DNQ		DNQ											-	-
1975	Lola T370	Ford V8	G	(Germany) Rolf Stommelen	13	14														-	-
1975	Lola T371	Ford V8	G	(Germany) Rolf Stommelen			7													-	-
1975	GH1	Ford V8	G	(Germany) Rolf Stommelen				Ret								16	Ret			**3**	**11th**
1975	GH1	Ford V8	G	(Australia) Vern Schuppan							Ret									**3**	**11th**
1975	GH1	Ford V8	G	(Australia) Alan Jones								13	16	10	5					**3**	**11th**
1975	GH1	Ford V8	G	(France) François Migault				NC		Ret										**3**	**11th**
1975	GH1	Ford V8	G	(United Kingdom) Graham Hill					DNQ											**3**	**11th**
1975	GH1	Ford V8	G	(United Kingdom) Tony Brise						Ret	6	7	7	15	Ret	15	Ret	Ret		**3**	**11th**

=== Formula One Non-Championship results ===
(key) (results in bold indicate pole position; results in italics indicate fastest lap)

Year	Chassis	Engine	Driver	1	2	3
1973	Brabham BT37	Ford Cosworth DFV V8		ROC	INT	
1973	Brabham BT37	Ford Cosworth DFV V8	(United Kingdom) Graham Hill	Ret		
1974	Lola T370	Ford Cosworth DFV V8		PRE	ROC	INT
1974	Lola T370	Ford Cosworth DFV V8	(United Kingdom) Graham Hill		NC	Ret
1974	Lola T370	Ford Cosworth DFV V8	(United Kingdom) Guy Edwards			9
1975	Lola T371	Ford Cosworth DFV V8		ROC	INT	SUI
1975	Lola T371	Ford Cosworth DFV V8	(Germany) Rolf Stommelen	9		
1975	GH1	Ford Cosworth DFV V8	(Germany) Rolf Stommelen			12
1975	GH1	Ford Cosworth DFV V8	(United Kingdom) Graham Hill		11	

== See also ==
- List of accidents involving sports teams
