= Embassy (cigarette) =

British brand of cigarettes

- Product type: Cigarette
- Current owner: Imperial Tobacco
- Country: United Kingdom
- Introduced: 1914; 112 years ago
- Markets: See Markets
- Tagline: "Inhale to your heart's content!"

Embassy is a British brand of cigarettes, currently owned and manufactured by Imperial Tobacco.

== History ==
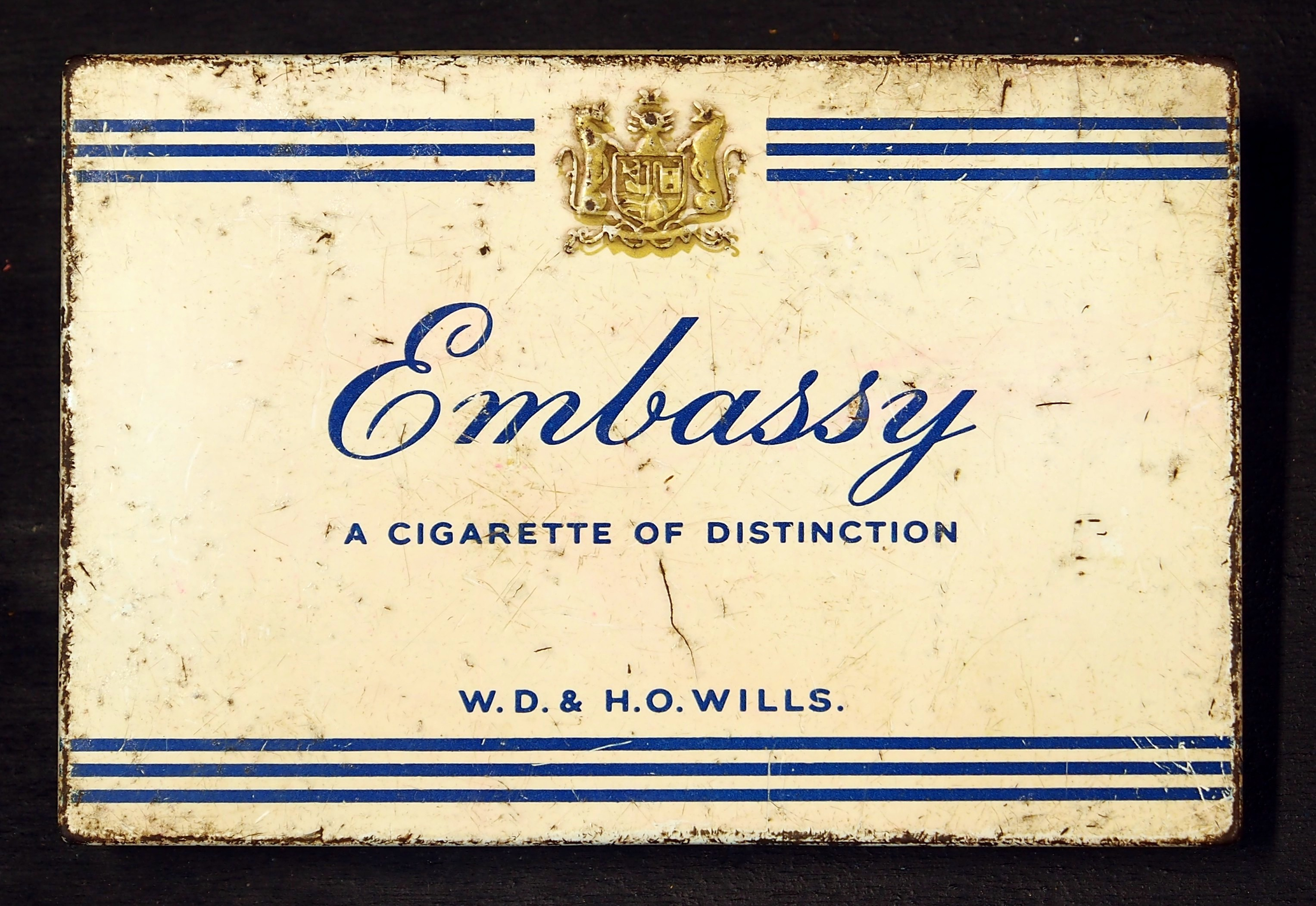
Old tin box of Embassy cigarettes

Embassy was launched in 1914 by W.D. & H.O. Wills and was later relaunched as a coupon brand in 1962.

Embassy Filter was Britain's top-selling brand from 1964 until 1970, when it was overtaken by Player's No. 6. At its peak, Embassy had 24% of the market in 1968, with one of its slogans being"Inhale to your heart's content!"

In 2001, Embassy had a 3.1% share of the UK licit cigarette market, and an estimated 4.8% share of the illicit market (based on seizures). In 2004, Embassy accounted for 24% of the premium segment of the UK market.

Embassy also has a sister brand, Embassy Regal.

In April 2014, Embassy shifted production from Nottingham to Germany and Poland.

In 2019, Embassy No. 1 Red changed its blend and cut prices. Embassy Regal remained the same.

== Sponsorships ==
=== Formula 1 ===
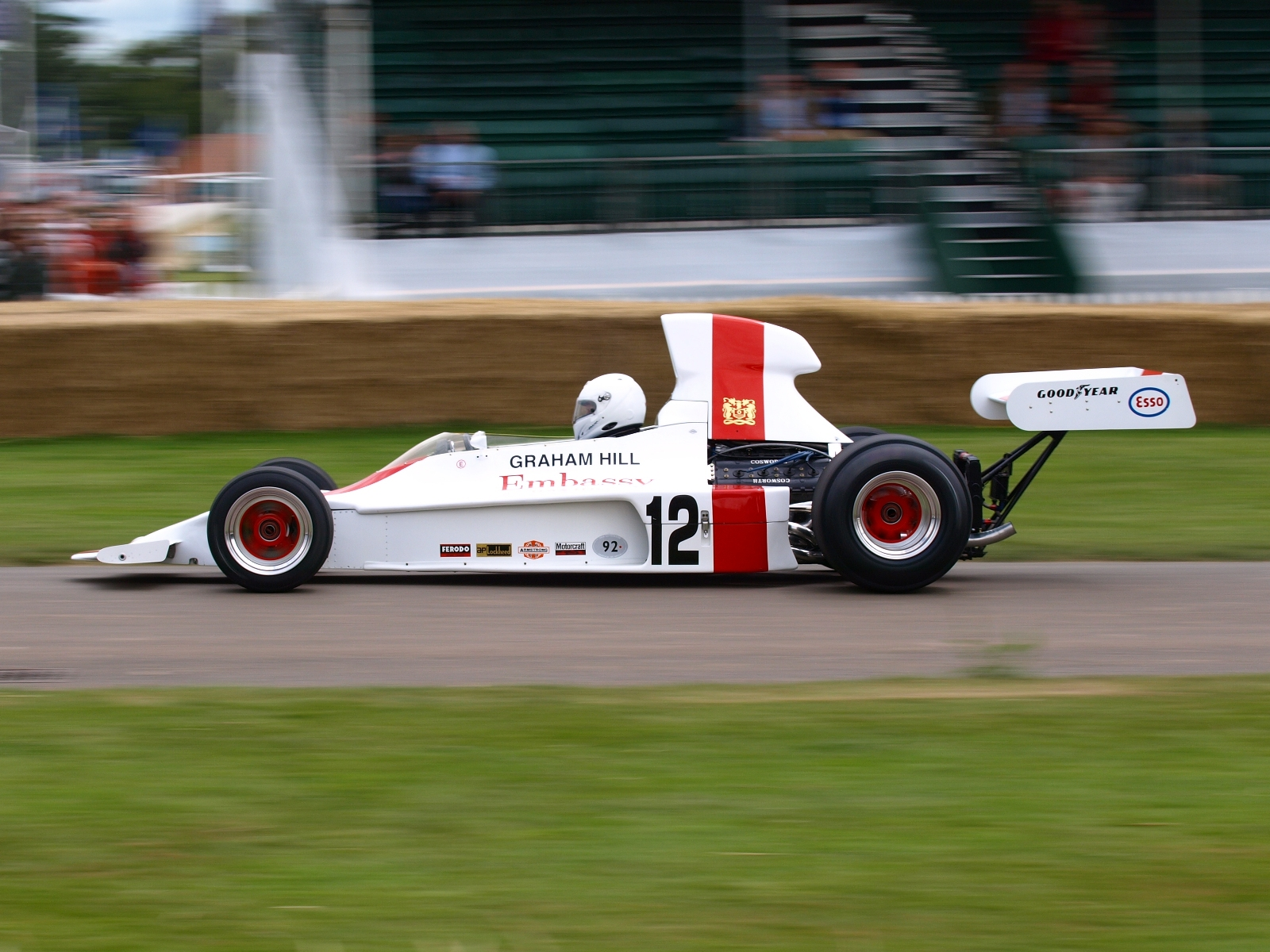
The Shadow DN1 entered and raced by Graham Hill at the 2008 Goodwood Festival of Speed.

In 1973, Embassy became the title sponsor of the new Formula One team Embassy Racing With Graham Hill, founded by two-time world champion Graham Hill. Hill was also the team's lead driver for its first two years. However, Embassy Hill struggled, securing only three points-scoring finishes in three years of racing. In 1975, Hill, his driver Tony Brise, and four other members of the team died in an accident, causing the end of the team.

=== Rallycross ===
The first two pan-European Rallycross series were sponsored by W.D. & H.O. Wills.

=== Snooker/darts ===
Embassy was the primary sponsor of the World Snooker Championships from 1976 to 2005; it was also the sponsor of the World Professional Darts Championship from 1978 until 2003, when the UK government banned all tobacco sponsorship in sport. Snooker and Formula 1 were the only two sports given a two-year extension until 2005. Two-time snooker world champion Alex Higgins sued the makers of Embassy in 1999, claiming that the encouragement from the sponsors to smoke Embassy cigarettes and the free cigarettes given to players had contributed to him contracting throat cancer.

=== Beauty pageants ===
Embassy has also sponsored the Miss Ghana beauty pageant.

== Markets ==
Embassy is mainly sold in the United Kingdom, but was or still is sold in Ireland, Germany, Spain, Tanzania, Malawi, Kenya, South Africa, Mauritius, Pakistan, Malaysia, Canada, United States, Trinidad, Cyprus and Argentina.

== Products ==
=== Current UK brands ===
- Embassy Filter
- Embassy Signature Gold (previously Embassy Number 1 Red)
- Embassy Signature Silver (previously Embassy Bright Blue)
- Embassy Signature Gold Superkings (previously Embassy Number 1 Red Superkings)
- Embassy Signature Silver Superkings
- Embassy Signature New Crush (previously Embassy Crushball)
- Regal Blue (Sister brand of Embassy)
- Regal Filter (Sister brand of Embassy)
- Embassy Signature Hand Rolling Tobacco

=== Discontinued UK brands ===
- Belair Menthol
- Embassy Envoy
- Embassy Gold
- Embassy No. 3
- Embassy No. 5
- Embassy No. 3 Extra Mild
- Embassy No. 5 Extra Mild
- Embassy Extra Mild
- Embassy No. 1 Extra Mild
- Embassy Premier with NSM (New Smoking Mixture)
- Embassy Crushball

In December 2020, Embassy No. 1 Red changed its name to Embassy Signature Gold, a weaker variety.
