= Tony Brise =

British racing driver (1952–1975)

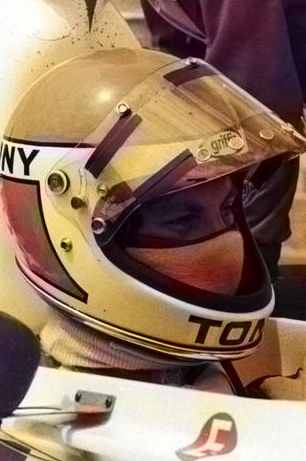
- Brise at the 1975 British Grand Prix
- Born: 28 March 1952; Erith, Kent, England, UK
- Died: 29 November 1975 (aged 23); Arkley, London, England, UK

Formula One World Championship career
- Nationality: (United Kingdom) British
- Active years: 1975
- Team(s): Williams, Hill
- Entries: 10
- Championships: 0
- Wins: 0
- Podiums: 0
- Career points: 1
- Pole positions: 0
- Fastest laps: 0
- First entry: 1975 Spanish Grand Prix
- Last entry: 1975 United States Grand Prix

Anthony William Brise (28 March 1952 – 29 November 1975) was an English racing driver, who took part in ten Formula One Grand Prix events in 1975, before dying in a plane crash with Graham Hill.

== Early life ==
Brise was born in Erith, Kent, the son of John Brise, a pig farmer and racing driver, who won the World Stock Car Championship on three occasions. Both Tony and his brother Tim showed an interest in go-karting at a young age, and John Brise gave up his hobby to support them fully.

== Early motor racing career ==
Brise won his first UK championship in 1969, and switched to single-seater racing the next year, driving an Elden MK8 Formula Ford. In 1971, he placed second in the BOC British FF1600 Championship. While completing a BSc in Business Administration at Aston University, he chose to continue with motor racing, joining Formula 3 in 1972 driving a Brabham BT28, the team run by Bernie Ecclestone. After switching to GRD 372, his performance increased until he was one of the top drivers in the formula. He won two of the three British Formula 3 Championships in 1973, sharing one (the Lombard North Central championship) with Richard Robarts, as well as winning the John Player. At the end of the season he won a Grovewood Award for the second time, shared with Tom Pryce.

Brise wished to move up to Formula 2 for the 1974 seasons, but was unable to due to financial limitations. Instead, he bought a second-hand March 733 car, fitting it with a Holbay-tuned Ford and entering the MCD Formula Atlantic series. He won the first round of the British Championship unexpectedly, but subsequently wrote the car off in a crash at Snetterton. However, his performance had brought him to the attention of Teddy Savory of Modus, who offered him a work drive in the series. Although the car was another modified F3 chassis, he drove well enough to earn a drive in a purpose-built car in 1975. He also drove a Modus M1 F3 in the Monaco Grand Prix F3 support race, finishing second behind Tom Pryce in a March 743. Brise excelled in the new car in 1975, winning six consecutive races, at Snetterton, Oulton Park, and twice each at Brands Hatch and Silverstone, enough to win him the MCD International Formula Atlantic Championship. As a result of these achievements, he was contacted by Frank Williams in April, to make his Formula One debut standing in for Jacques Laffite.

== Formula One career ==
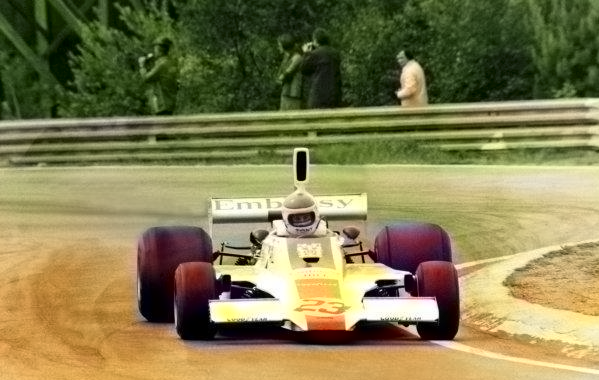
Brise at the 1975 Belgian Grand Prix, driving the Hill GH1 for Embassy Hill

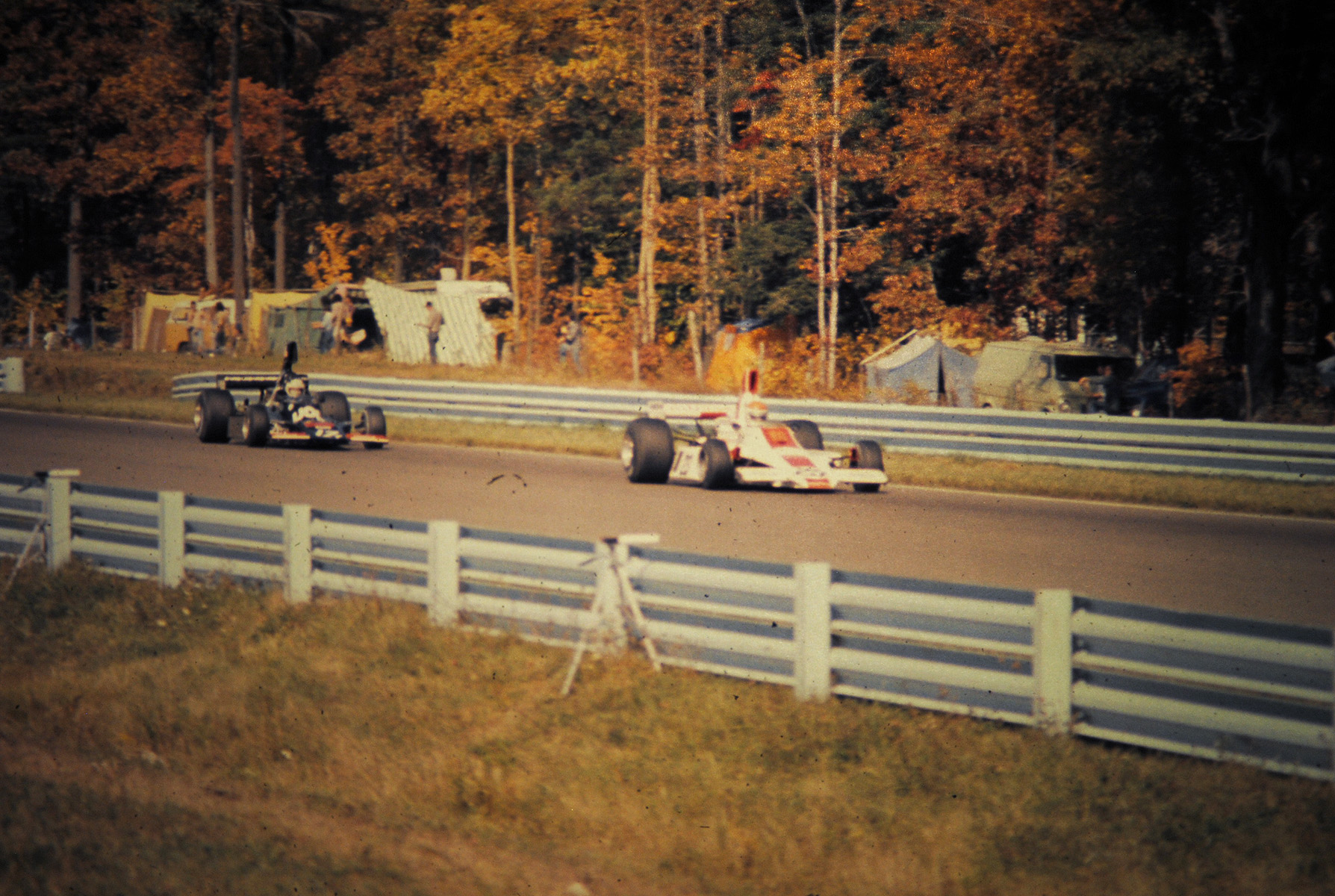
Brise (in front) at the 1975 United States Grand Prix

Brise made his Grand Prix debut on 27 April 1975 for Williams at the Spanish Grand Prix in Montjuic Park near Barcelona, a controversial race marred by strikes over safety issues, a high number of crashes, and the deaths of four spectators. Brise finished seventh in this race, two laps behind the leaders, his race affected by a collision with Tom Pryce.

Laffite returned for the subsequent Monaco Grand Prix, demoting Brise once again to Formula Atlantic, though former world champion Graham Hill's retirement at that race, due to a failure to qualify, brought Brise straight back into the higher formula driving for Embassy Hill, intended to be for the rest of the season. Over the next few races Brise showed a lot of promise, recording some very fast qualifying times and frequently outperforming his team-mate, Alan Jones. However, a combination of technical difficulties and bad luck prevented him from ever finishing in high leader-board positions, and he took just one championship point. Nonetheless, by consensus he was considered a bright hope and one to watch for the future, with a successful season anticipated in 1976.

== Plane crash ==
On 29 November 1975, Hill and Brise, along with Andy Smallman, the team's designer, and three team mechanics, were returning to London from southern France, where they were testing a new race car, the GH2. The Embassy Hill plane, a twin-engine six-seat Piper Aztec piloted by Hill, was attempting to land at Elstree Airfield at night in thick fog when it crashed and burned at Arkley golf course, killing all six aboard. Brise was 23 years old.

== Personal life ==
Brise's wife, Janet, was the daughter of triallist Reg Allen. His nephew, David Brise, is currently driving in the Britcar Endurance Championship in a Saker RAPX.

== Complete Formula One results ==
(key)

Year	Entrant	Chassis	Engine	1	2	3	4	5	6	7	8	9	10	11	12	13	14	WDC	Points
1975	Frank Williams Racing Cars	Williams FW03	Cosworth V8	ARG	BRA	RSA	ESP; 7	MON										19th	1
1975	Embassy Racing with Graham Hill	Hill GH1	Cosworth V8						BEL; Ret	SWE; 6	NED; 7	FRA; 7	GBR; 15	GER; Ret	AUT; 15	ITA; Ret	USA; Ret	19th	1

Sporting positions
Preceded by Rikky von Opel	British Formula 3 Championship; BRSCC North Central Lombard Series Champion; 1973	Succeeded by Brian Henton (Combined championship)
Preceded by Roger Williamson	British Formula 3 Championship; BRSCC JPS Series Champion; 1973	Succeeded by Brian Henton (Combined championship)
