= 1975 Dutch Grand Prix =

Race details
- Date: 22 June 1975
- Official name: XXII Grand Prix Zandvoort
- Location: Zandvoort
- Course: Permanent racing facility
- Course length: 4.226 km (2.626 miles)
- Distance: 75 laps, 316.950 km (196.944 miles)
- Weather: Wet, drying later

Pole position
Driver	(Austria) Niki Lauda	Ferrari
- Time: 1:20.29

Fastest lap
Driver	(Austria) Niki Lauda	Ferrari
- Time: 1:21.54 on lap 55

Podium
First	(United Kingdom) James Hunt	Hesketh-Ford
Second	(Austria) Niki Lauda	Ferrari
Third	(Switzerland) Clay Regazzoni	Ferrari
- Lap leaders: Source

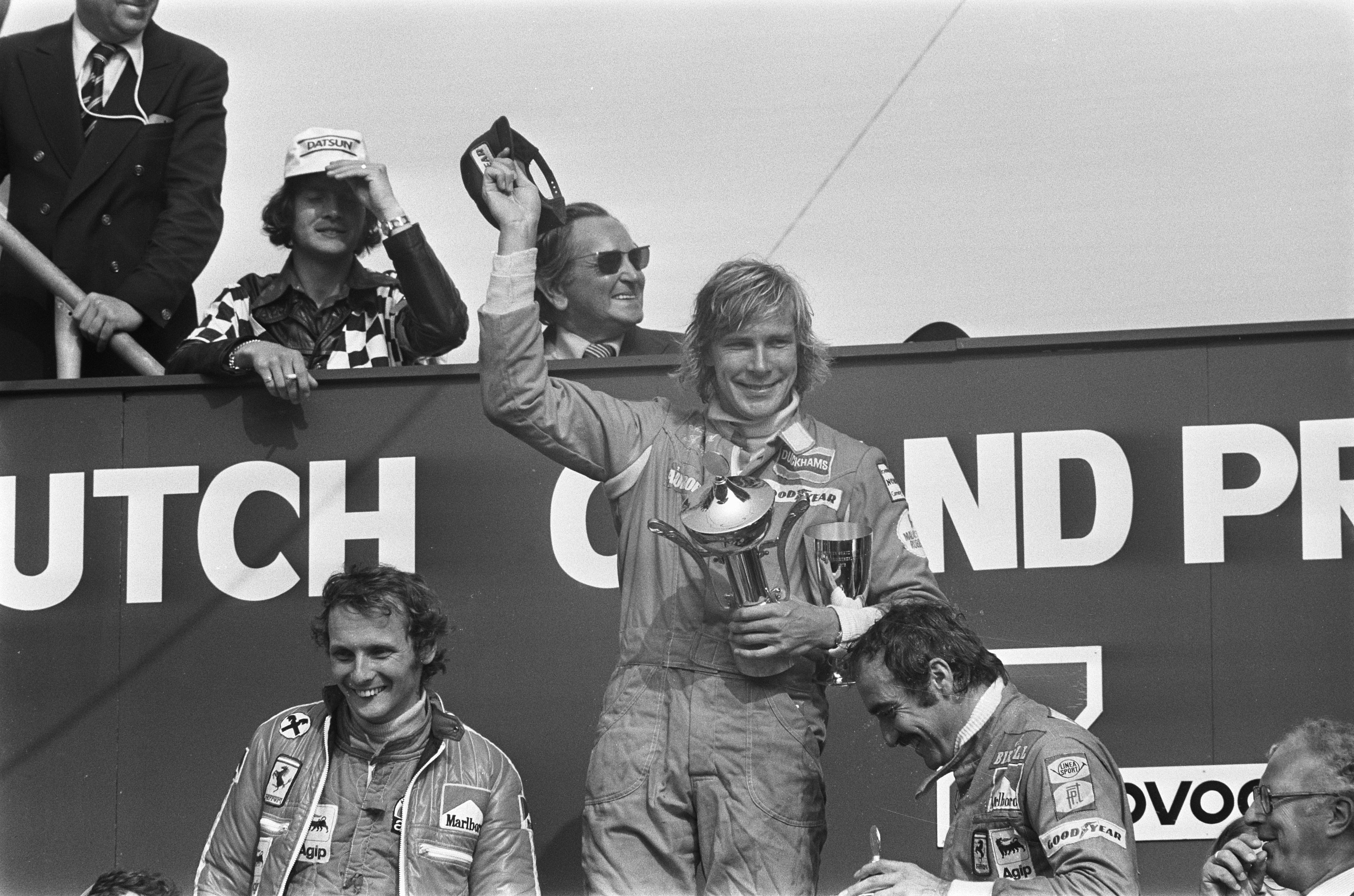
The podium with Lauda, Hunt and Regazzoni

The 1975 Dutch Grand Prix was a Formula One motor race held at Circuit Zandvoort on 22 June 1975. It was race 8 of 14 in both the 1975 World Championship of Drivers and the 1975 International Cup for Formula One Manufacturers. It was the 24th Dutch Grand Prix. It was held over 75 laps of the four kilometre circuit for a race distance of 317 kilometres.

The event is frequently cited for one of the most significant underdog victories in the history of Formula One. British driver and future world champion James Hunt won his first Formula One Grand Prix. This provided small privateer operation, Hesketh Racing, the highlight of its six-year history with its first and only Grand Prix win. Hunt drove his Hesketh 308 to a single second win over the Ferrari 312T driven by the World Championship points leader, Austrian driver Niki Lauda. Third place was taken by Lauda's Ferrari teammate, Swiss driver Clay Regazzoni.

== Race summary ==
Niki Lauda dominated practice, with teammate Clay Regazzoni joining him on the front row. Jean-Pierre Jarier had a crash and the Maki team's weekend ended abruptly in a cloud of smoke from engine problems. James Hunt had a storming practice to take third place on the grid. On Saturday afternoon, weather conditions meant practice times would not improve, so Hunt was sent out to get some extra testing – during which something in the metering unit broke. This was fortunate as the Dutch Grand Prix did not have Sunday morning practice, so had it not been for those extra laps, the mechanical problems would have occurred during the race itself.

The race was delayed by rainstorms as the teams persuaded the organizers to let them run on wet tyres. Lauda led from Jody Scheckter whilst Vittorio Brambilla and Patrick Depailler collided. Jochen Mass was having metering unit troubles and Jacky Ickx exploded his engine. Meanwhile, Hunt had changed onto dry tyres and was gaining time rapidly on the drying surface to take the lead from Jarier and Lauda by lap 15. The Austrian championship leader was finding overtaking a very difficult prospect indeed. Emerson Fittipaldi dropped out with engine problems whilst John Watson broke a wing support and Carlos Reutemann got past Tom Pryce who was suffering from brake problems.

On lap 43, Jarier spun when a tyre burst. Lauda now pursued Hunt desperately for over 20 laps, putting him under immense pressure. Hunt had cracked under similar pressure in Buenos Aires, but this time he resisted. The Ferrari managed to gain on the slow corners, but Hunt pulled ahead on the fast corners and down the straight. The TV directors were so confused that the captions showed three laps left to go when a massive roar from the grandstands signalled it was all over. Hunt became the first Englishman to win a Grand Prix since Peter Gethin four years earlier.

Lauda's second place reinforced his championship lead, which expanded to 13 points over Brabham driver Carlos Reutemann.

== Classification ==
=== Qualifying ===
Pos.	Driver	Constructor	Time/Gap
1	(Austria) Niki Lauda	Ferrari	1:20.29
2	(Switzerland) Clay Regazzoni	Ferrari	+0.28
3	(United Kingdom) James Hunt	Hesketh–Ford	+0.41
4	(South Africa) Jody Scheckter	Tyrrell–Ford	+0.45
5	(Argentina) Carlos Reutemann	Brabham–Ford	+0.58
6	(Brazil) Emerson Fittipaldi	McLaren–Ford	+0.62
7	(United Kingdom) Tony Brise	Hill–Ford	+0.65
8	(West Germany) Jochen Mass	McLaren–Ford	+0.72
9	(Brazil) Carlos Pace	Brabham–Ford	+0.77
10	(France) Jean-Pierre Jarier	Shadow–Ford	+0.81
11	(Italy) Vittorio Brambilla	March–Ford	+0.85
12	(United Kingdom) Tom Pryce	Shadow–Ford	+0.87
13	(France) Patrick Depailler	Tyrrell–Ford	+0.91
14	(United Kingdom) John Watson	Surtees–Ford	+0.94
15	(France) Jacques Laffite	Williams–Ford	+1.03
16	(Sweden) Ronnie Peterson	Lotus–Ford	+1.17
17	(Australia) Alan Jones	Hill–Ford	+1.72
18	(United States) Mark Donohue	Penske–Ford	+2.04
19	(South Africa) Ian Scheckter	Williams–Ford	+2.53
20	(United Kingdom) Bob Evans	BRM	+2.68
21	(Belgium) Jacky Ickx	Lotus–Ford	+2.91
22	(Netherlands) Gijs van Lennep	Ensign–Ford	+3.01
23	(Italy) Lella Lombardi	March–Ford	+3.70
24	(Brazil) Wilson Fittipaldi	Fittipaldi–Ford	+3.86
25	(Japan) Hiroshi Fushida	Maki–Ford	+13.08

=== Race ===
Pos	No	Driver	Constructor	Laps	Time/Retired	Grid	Points
1	24	(United Kingdom) James Hunt	Hesketh-Ford	75	1:46:57.40	3	9
2	12	(Austria) Niki Lauda	Ferrari	75	+ 1.06	1	6
3	11	(Switzerland) Clay Regazzoni	Ferrari	75	+ 55.06	2	4
4	7	(Argentina) Carlos Reutemann	Brabham-Ford	74	+ 1 lap	5	3
5	8	(Brazil) Carlos Pace	Brabham-Ford	74	+ 1 lap	9	2
6	16	(United Kingdom) Tom Pryce	Shadow-Ford	74	+ 1 lap	12	1
7	23	(United Kingdom) Tony Brise	Hill-Ford	74	+ 1 lap	7	
8	28	(United States) Mark Donohue	Penske-Ford	74	+ 1 lap	18	
9	4	(France) Patrick Depailler	Tyrrell-Ford	73	+ 2 laps	13	
10	31	(Netherlands) Gijs van Lennep	Ensign-Ford	71	+ 4 laps	22	
11	30	(Brazil) Wilson Fittipaldi	Fittipaldi-Ford	71	+ 4 laps	24	
12	20	(South Africa) Ian Scheckter	Williams-Ford	70	+ 5 laps	19	
13	22	(Australia) Alan Jones	Hill-Ford	70	+ 5 laps	17	
14	10	(Italy) Lella Lombardi	March-Ford	70	+ 5 laps	23	
15	5	(Sweden) Ronnie Peterson	Lotus-Ford	69	Out of fuel	16	
16	3	(South Africa) Jody Scheckter	Tyrrell-Ford	67	Engine	4	
Ret	21	(France) Jacques Laffite	Williams-Ford	64	Engine	15	
Ret	2	(West Germany) Jochen Mass	McLaren-Ford	61	Accident	8	
Ret	17	(France) Jean-Pierre Jarier	Shadow-Ford	44	Tyre	10	
Ret	18	(United Kingdom) John Watson	Surtees-Ford	43	Vibrations	14	
Ret	1	(Brazil) Emerson Fittipaldi	McLaren-Ford	40	Engine	6	
Ret	14	(United Kingdom) Bob Evans	BRM	23	Differential	20	
Ret	6	(Belgium) Jacky Ickx	Lotus-Ford	6	Engine	21	
Ret	9	(Italy) Vittorio Brambilla	March-Ford	0	Suspension	11	
DNS	35	(Japan) Hiroshi Fushida	Maki-Ford				

== Notes ==
- This was the Formula One World Championship debut for Japanese driver Hiroshi Fushida – the first Japanese to participate in a Formula One World Championship race.
- This was the 10th Grand Prix start for American constructor Penske.
- This was the 1st Grand Prix win for British constructor Hesketh.
- This race marked the 200th and 201st podium finish for Ferrari and a Ferrari-powered car.
- Mario Andretti ran the whole of the 1975 Formula One World Championships calendar, except for Belgium and this event. Andretti participated in time trials for the 1975 Pocono 500, precluding his participation.

== Championship standings after the race ==
Drivers' Championship standings

	Pos	Driver	Points
	1	(Austria) Niki Lauda	38
	2	(Argentina) Carlos Reutemann	25
	3	(Brazil) Emerson Fittipaldi	21
	4	(Brazil) Carlos Pace	18
4	5	(United Kingdom) James Hunt	16

Constructors' Championship standings

Pos	Constructor	Points
1	(Italy) Ferrari	41
2	(United Kingdom) Brabham-Ford	36 (38)
3	(United Kingdom) McLaren-Ford	26.5
4	(United Kingdom) Tyrrell-Ford	19
5	(United Kingdom) Hesketh-Ford	16

- Note: Only the top five positions are included for both sets of standings. Only the best 6 results from the first 7 races and the best 6 results from the last 7 races counted towards the championship. Numbers without parentheses are championship points; numbers in parentheses are total points scored.

Previous race: 1975 Swedish Grand Prix	FIA Formula One World Championship; 1975 season	Next race: 1975 French Grand Prix
Previous race: 1974 Dutch Grand Prix	Dutch Grand Prix	Next race: 1976 Dutch Grand Prix
