= 1975 Spanish Grand Prix =

Race details
- Date: 27 April 1975
- Official name: XXI Gran Premio de España
- Location: Montjuïc Circuit, Barcelona, Spain
- Course: Street circuit
- Course length: 3.790 km (2.355 miles)
- Distance: 29 laps, 109.91 km (68.29 miles)
- Scheduled distance: 75 laps, 284.25 km (176.62 miles)
- Weather: Sunny

Pole position
Driver	(Austria) Niki Lauda	Ferrari
- Time: 1:23.4

Fastest lap
Driver	(United States) Mario Andretti	Parnelli-Ford
- Time: 1:25.1 on lap 14

Podium
First	(West Germany) Jochen Mass	McLaren-Ford
Second	(Belgium) Jacky Ickx	Lotus-Ford
Third	(Argentina) Carlos Reutemann	Brabham-Ford

The 1975 Spanish Grand Prix was a Formula One motor race held at Montjuïc Circuit on 27 April 1975. It was race 4 of 14 in both the 1975 World Championship of Drivers and the 1975 International Cup for Formula One Manufacturers. Lella Lombardi became the first and, as of 2026, only woman to score points in the World Championship. Lombardi scored 0.5 points as this was the first time a race was stopped before 60% completion leading to the awarding of half the points that would be awarded for a completed race. During the race, a spectator, a fireman and two journalists were hit by the Hill GH1 of Rolf Stommelen, after he crashed and landed in a spectator area, causing their deaths. The race was also future world champion Alan Jones' first Grand Prix start.

It was the 21st Spanish Grand Prix since the race was first held in 1913. It was the fourth, and last, Grand Prix to be held on the Montjuïc street circuit. The race was shortened to 29 of its scheduled 75 laps, a race distance of 109 kilometres. The race was won by German driver Jochen Mass driving a McLaren M23. It would be the only Formula One win of his career. Mass had just a second lead over the Lotus 72E of Belgian driver Jacky Ickx when the race was declared. Argentine racer Carlos Reutemann was declared third in his Brabham BT44B, a lap behind the race leaders after a penalty was given to Jean-Pierre Jarier. This was the last win by a German driver until Michael Schumacher won the 1992 Belgian Grand Prix.

== Qualifying ==
Right from the start, the drivers who were members of the Grand Prix Drivers Association were furious that the barriers were not bolted together properly. Thus, they went on strike. Most of the sport's major players refused to take part in practice. Jacky Ickx was not a member of the GPDA, and one of the few marquee drivers who did practice.

Track staff worked overnight to fix the barriers, and to make sure everything would be fixed in time for qualifying on Saturday, some of the teams sent out mechanics to help. The drivers, though, still were not convinced, but the race organizers threatened legal action if no race was run. This, and rumors that the Guardia Civil would seize the cars which were in the paddock, which was at Montjuïc Stadium, forced the drivers to call off the strike.

The defending World Champion Emerson Fittipaldi, however, was still furious. He did the minimum three laps, but at a very slow pace, then pulled into the pits.

=== Qualifying classification ===
Pos	No	Driver	Constructor	Time
1	12	(Austria) Niki Lauda	Ferrari	1:23.4
2	11	(Switzerland) Clay Regazzoni	Ferrari	1:23.5
3	24	(United Kingdom) James Hunt	Hesketh-Ford	1:23.8
4	27	(United States) Mario Andretti	Parnelli-Ford	1:23.9
5	9	(Italy) Vittorio Brambilla	March-Ford	1:24.2
6	18	(United Kingdom) John Watson	Surtees-Ford	1:24.3
7	4	(France) Patrick Depailler	Tyrrell-Ford	1:24.4
8	16	(United Kingdom) Tom Pryce	Shadow-Ford	1:24.5
9	22	(West Germany) Rolf Stommelen	Hill-Ford	1:24.7
10	17	(France) Jean-Pierre Jarier	Shadow-Ford	1:25.0
11	2	(West Germany) Jochen Mass	McLaren-Ford	1:25.2
12	5	(Sweden) Ronnie Peterson	Lotus-Ford	1:25.3
13	3	(South Africa) Jody Scheckter	Tyrrell-Ford	1:25.4
14	8	(Brazil) Carlos Pace	Brabham-Ford	1:25.8
15	7	(Argentina) Carlos Reutemann	Brabham-Ford	1:25.8
16	6	(Belgium) Jacky Ickx	Lotus-Ford	1:26.3
17	28	(United States) Mark Donohue	Penske-Ford	1:26.3
18	21	(United Kingdom) Tony Brise	Williams-Ford	1:26.4
19	31	(Netherlands) Roelof Wunderink	Ensign-Ford	1:26.6
20	25	(Australia) Alan Jones	Hesketh-Ford	1:26.7
21	30	(Brazil) Wilson Fittipaldi	Fittipaldi-Ford	1:27.2
22	23	(France) François Migault	Hill-Ford	1:27.9
23	14	(United Kingdom) Bob Evans	BRM	1:28.8
24	10	(Italy) Lella Lombardi	March-Ford	1:30.3
25	20	(Italy) Arturo Merzario	Williams-Ford	1:54.3
26	1	(Brazil) Emerson Fittipaldi	McLaren-Ford	2:10.2

== Race ==
On the morning of the race, Fittipaldi announced he would not race, and went back home. During the morning, Ken Tyrrell went out onto the circuit with a wrench to make sure the barriers were in good condition. The race was due to start at 12:30pm but there were delays.

The two Ferraris of Niki Lauda (on pole) and Clay Regazzoni qualified on the front row. At the start, Vittorio Brambilla's March tangled with Mario Andretti's Parnelli. Andretti's car hit the back of Lauda's, sending him into Regazzoni. Lauda was out immediately, while Regazzoni took his car to the garage, where repairs were made, and Regazzoni was sent back out. Patrick Depailler also retired on the first lap because of suspension damage, and Wilson Fittipaldi and Arturo Merzario withdrew in protest.

After the first-corner incidents, James Hunt was shown as the leader. Despite being involved in contact, Andretti had managed to keep going and was running in second. John Watson was in third, Rolf Stommelen was fourth, Brambilla fifth, and Carlos Pace sixth.

On lap four, the engine in Jody Scheckter's Tyrrell blew, and oil on the circuit caused Alan Jones and Mark Donohue to crash. Three laps later, Hunt also slipped in the oil and crashed. The top three had become Andretti, Watson, and Stommelen. Watson's car suffered from vibrations and dropped out. Andretti's rear suspension lasted only seven more laps before it failed, causing him to crash out of the lead. Jean-Pierre Jarier and Brambilla stopped to change tyres, while Tom Pryce and Tony Brise tangled. Stommelen was now in the top spot, followed by Pace, Ronnie Peterson, Jochen Mass, and Ickx. On lap 24, Peterson was out after he tangled with François Migault while trying to lap the Frenchman.

Two laps later, tragedy struck. The rear wing on Stommelen's Embassy Hill broke, sending him into the barrier. He bounced off it and back into the road, hitting the barrier across the way, and flying over it. While trying to avoid Stommelen as he crossed the track, Pace crashed. Four people were killed by Stommelen's flying car: fireman Joaquín Benaches Morera, spectator Andrés Ruiz Villanova, and two photo-journalists, Mario de Roia and Antonio Font Bayarri. Stommelen himself suffered a broken leg, a broken wrist, and two cracked ribs.

The race continued for another four laps, during which Mass passed Ickx for the lead. On lap 29, the race was halted with Mass the winner, Ickx second, and Jean-Pierre Jarier crossed the line in third position. Carlos Reutemann finished fourth ahead of Brambilla in fifth. Lella Lombardi finished in sixth and became the only woman in Formula One to score championship points. With the race being stopped before 60% of the scheduled race distance was reached, only half points were awarded for the first time in the history of the championship. After the race, stewards found that Jarier had overtaken in a portion of the track covered by a yellow flag caution. Jarier was given a sixty-second penalty that relegated him to fourth position.

=== Race classification ===
Pos	No	Driver	Constructor	Laps	Time/Retired	Grid	Points
1	2	(West Germany) Jochen Mass	McLaren-Ford	29	42:53.7	11	4.5
2	6	(Belgium) Jacky Ickx	Lotus-Ford	29	+ 1.1	16	3
3	7	(Argentina) Carlos Reutemann	Brabham-Ford	28	+ 1 lap	15	2
4	17	(France) Jean-Pierre Jarier	Shadow-Ford	28	+ 1 lap	10	1.5
5	9	(Italy) Vittorio Brambilla	March-Ford	28	+ 1 lap	5	1
6	10	(Italy) Lella Lombardi	March-Ford	27	+ 2 laps	24	0.5
7	21	(United Kingdom) Tony Brise	Williams-Ford	27	+ 2 laps	18	
8	18	(United Kingdom) John Watson	Surtees-Ford	26	+ 3 laps	6	
NC	11	(Switzerland) Clay Regazzoni	Ferrari	25	+ 4 laps	2	
Ret	22	(West Germany) Rolf Stommelen	Hill-Ford	25	Accident	9	
Ret	8	(Brazil) José Carlos Pace	Brabham-Ford	25	Collision	14	
Ret	16	(United Kingdom) Tom Pryce	Shadow-Ford	23	Accident	8	
Ret	5	(Sweden) Ronnie Peterson	Lotus-Ford	23	Suspension	12	
Ret	31	(Netherlands) Roelof Wunderink	Ensign-Ford	20	Transmission	19	
NC	23	(France) François Migault	Hill-Ford	18	+ 11 laps	22	
Ret	27	(United States) Mario Andretti	Parnelli-Ford	16	Suspension	4	
Ret	14	(United Kingdom) Bob Evans	BRM	7	Fuel system	23	
Ret	24	(United Kingdom) James Hunt	Hesketh-Ford	6	Accident	3	
Ret	3	(South Africa) Jody Scheckter	Tyrrell-Ford	3	Engine	13	
Ret	28	(United States) Mark Donohue	Penske-Ford	3	Collision	17	
Ret	25	(Australia) Alan Jones	Hesketh-Ford	3	Collision	20	
Ret	4	(France) Patrick Depailler	Tyrrell-Ford	1	Collision damage	7	
Ret	30	(Brazil) Wilson Fittipaldi	Fittipaldi-Ford	1	Withdrew	21	
Ret	20	(Italy) Arturo Merzario	Williams-Ford	1	Withdrew	25	
Ret	12	(Austria) Niki Lauda	Ferrari	0	Collision	1	
DNS	1	(Brazil) Emerson Fittipaldi	McLaren-Ford	0	Non-starter	26	

== Notes ==
- This was the Formula One World Championship debut for British driver Tony Brise and Dutch driver Roelof Wunderink.
- This was the Formula One World Championship debut for British constructor Hill. Previously, Hill had entered Lolas.
- This race marked the first fastest lap set by a Parnelli.

== Championship standings after the race ==
Drivers' Championship standings

	Pos	Driver	Points
	1	(Brazil) Emerson Fittipaldi	15
	2	(Brazil) Carlos Pace	12
	3	(Argentina) Carlos Reutemann	12
4	4	(West Germany) Jochen Mass	9.5
1	5	(South Africa) Jody Scheckter	9

Constructors' Championship standings

Pos	Constructor	Points
1	(United Kingdom) Brabham-Ford	21
2	(United Kingdom) McLaren-Ford	20.5
3	(United Kingdom) Tyrrell-Ford	11
4	(Italy) Ferrari	8
5	(United Kingdom) Hesketh-Ford	7

- Note: Only the top five positions are included for both sets of standings.

== See also ==
- 1955 Le Mans disaster, another racing incident involving the grandstand

Previous race: 1975 South African Grand Prix	FIA Formula One World Championship; 1975 season	Next race: 1975 Monaco Grand Prix
Previous race: 1974 Spanish Grand Prix	Spanish Grand Prix	Next race: 1976 Spanish Grand Prix
