= 1975 Swedish Grand Prix =

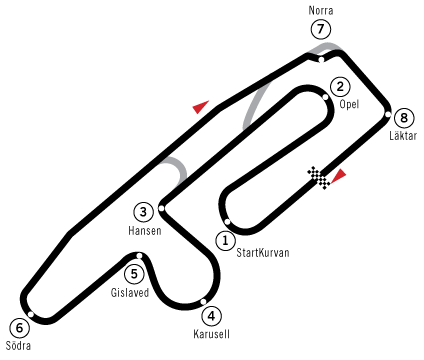

Race details
- Date: 8 June 1975
- Location: Scandinavian Raceway, Anderstorp
- Course length: 4.018 km (2.497 miles)
- Distance: 80 laps, 321.440 km (199.734 miles)
- Weather: Dry

Pole position
Driver	(Italy) Vittorio Brambilla	March-Ford
- Time: 1:24.630

Fastest lap
Driver	(Austria) Niki Lauda	Ferrari
- Time: 1:28.267 on lap 61

Podium
First	(Austria) Niki Lauda	Ferrari
Second	(Argentina) Carlos Reutemann	Brabham-Ford
Third	(Switzerland) Clay Regazzoni	Ferrari

The 1975 Swedish Grand Prix was a Formula One motor race held at the Scandinavian Raceway at Anderstorp on 8 June 1975. It was race 7 of 14 in both the 1975 World Championship of Drivers and the 1975 International Cup for Formula One Manufacturers. It was the sixth Swedish Grand Prix after it was first held as the Swedish Summer Grand Prix in 1933, and the third to be held at Scandinavian Raceway. It was held over 80 laps of the four kilometre circuit for a race distance of 322 kilometres.

The race was won by Austrian driver Niki Lauda driving Ferrari 312T. He took a six-second victory over the Brabham BT44B of Argentinian racer Carlos Reutemann. Lauda's Ferrari teammate, Swiss driver Clay Regazzoni finished third. It was Lauda's third consecutive win of the season after the Monaco and Belgian Grands Prix. The win strengthened his lead in the championship to ten points with Reutemann moving past Emerson Fittipaldi into second place.

== Race report ==
Qualifying resulted in pole position for Vittorio Brambilla in his March, while Lauda qualified fifth fastest and his teammate Clay Regazzoni 11th. In the race Brambilla took the lead, but by lap 16 he was overtaken by Carlos Reutemann's Brabham and eventually had to retire with a blistered front tyre. Tom Pryce had to pit early due to throttle slides being clogged by sand, whilst Patrick Depailler suffered a brake line leak. Hunt retired on lap 22 with a brake-pipe leak, promoting Regazzoni and Mario Andretti. Poor Jean-Pierre Jarier lost second place to failing oil pressure on lap 38. Young Tony Brise was showing little respect for his elders, overtaking Mark Donohue and Ronnie Peterson and then challenging championship leader Emerson Fittipaldi. The battle which ensued slowed them up and John Watson in the Surtees had soon climbed up behind them. Meanwhile, Lauda was steadily progressing through the field and on lap 42 he was second. He put a series of fastest laps, benefiting from a harder tyre compound, closed on Reutemann and overtook him to win the Grand Prix by 6 seconds. Reutemann finished second with Regazzoni, in the other Ferrari 312T, third. Brise had his gearbox jammed in fourth and surrendered to Donohue, but on his third Grand Prix gained his first World Championship point and Graham Hill's first as a constructor. It would prove the only point of Brise's promising but brief F1 career. Fittipaldi suffered braking problems and was passed by Jody Scheckter at the race end to finish in eighth.

== Classification ==
=== Qualifying ===
Pos.	Driver	Constructor	Time/Gap
1	(Italy) Vittorio Brambilla	March–Ford	1:24.630
2	(France) Patrick Depailler	Tyrrell–Ford	+0.380
3	(France) Jean-Pierre Jarier	Shadow–Ford	+0.430
4	(Argentina) Carlos Reutemann	Brabham–Ford	+0.550
5	(Austria) Niki Lauda	Ferrari	+0.827
6	(Brazil) Carlos Pace	Brabham–Ford	+1.172
7	(United Kingdom) Tom Pryce	Shadow–Ford	+1.236
8	(South Africa) Jody Scheckter	Tyrrell–Ford	+1.270
9	(Sweden) Ronnie Peterson	Lotus–Ford	+1.382
10	(United Kingdom) John Watson	Surtees–Ford	+1.455
11	(Brazil) Emerson Fittipaldi	McLaren–Ford	+1.458
12	(Switzerland) Clay Regazzoni	Ferrari	+1.653
13	(United Kingdom) James Hunt	Hesketh–Ford	+1.870
14	(West Germany) Jochen Mass	McLaren–Ford	+2.143
15	(United States) Mario Andretti	Parnelli–Ford	+2.191
16	(United States) Mark Donohue	Penske–Ford	+2.524
17	(United Kingdom) Tony Brise	Hill–Ford	+2.688
18	(Belgium) Jacky Ickx	Lotus–Ford	+2.690
19	(Australia) Alan Jones	Hesketh–Ford	+2.745
20	(South Africa) Ian Scheckter	Williams–Ford	+2.840
21	(Sweden) Torsten Palm	Hesketh–Ford	+3.012
22	(United Kingdom) Damien Magee	Williams–Ford	+3.046
23	(United Kingdom) Bob Evans	BRM	+3.792
24	(Italy) Lella Lombardi	March–Ford	+4.057
25	(Brazil) Wilson Fittipaldi	Fittipaldi–Ford	+4.180
26	(Australia) Vern Schuppan	Hill–Ford	+4.350

=== Race ===
Pos	No	Driver	Constructor	Laps	Time/Retired	Grid	Points
1	12	(Austria) Niki Lauda	Ferrari	80	1:59:18.319	5	9
2	7	(Argentina) Carlos Reutemann	Brabham-Ford	80	+ 6.288	4	6
3	11	(Switzerland) Clay Regazzoni	Ferrari	80	+ 29.095	12	4
4	27	(United States) Mario Andretti	Parnelli-Ford	80	+ 44.380	15	3
5	28	(United States) Mark Donohue	Penske-Ford	80	+ 1:30.763	16	2
6	23	(United Kingdom) Tony Brise	Hill-Ford	79	+ 1 Lap	17	1
7	3	(South Africa) Jody Scheckter	Tyrrell-Ford	79	+ 1 Lap	8	
8	1	(Brazil) Emerson Fittipaldi	McLaren-Ford	79	+ 1 Lap	11	
9	5	(Sweden) Ronnie Peterson	Lotus-Ford	79	+ 1 Lap	9	
10	32	(Sweden) Torsten Palm	Hesketh-Ford	78	Out of fuel	21	
11	26	(Australia) Alan Jones	Hesketh-Ford	78	+ 2 Laps	19	
12	4	(France) Patrick Depailler	Tyrrell-Ford	78	+ 2 Laps	2	
13	14	(United Kingdom) Bob Evans	BRM	78	+ 2 Laps	23	
14	20	(United Kingdom) Damien Magee	Williams-Ford	78	+ 2 Laps	22	
15	6	(Belgium) Jacky Ickx	Lotus-Ford	77	+ 3 Laps	18	
16	18	(United Kingdom) John Watson	Surtees-Ford	77	+ 3 Laps	10	
17	30	(Brazil) Wilson Fittipaldi	Fittipaldi-Ford	74	+ 6 Laps	25	
Ret	16	(United Kingdom) Tom Pryce	Shadow-Ford	53	Spun off	7	
Ret	21	(South Africa) Ian Scheckter	Williams-Ford	49	Tyre	20	
Ret	22	(Australia) Vern Schuppan	Hill-Ford	47	Transmission	26	
Ret	8	(Brazil) Carlos Pace	Brabham-Ford	41	Spun off	6	
Ret	17	(France) Jean-Pierre Jarier	Shadow-Ford	38	Engine	3	
Ret	9	(Italy) Vittorio Brambilla	March-Ford	36	Transmission	1	
Ret	2	(West Germany) Jochen Mass	McLaren-Ford	34	Overheating	14	
Ret	24	(United Kingdom) James Hunt	Hesketh-Ford	21	Brakes	13	
Ret	10	(Italy) Lella Lombardi	March-Ford	10	Fuel system	24	
WD	31	(Netherlands) Gijs van Lennep	Ensign-Ford				
WD	35	(Australia) Dave Walker	Maki-Ford				

== Notes ==
- This was the Formula One World Championship debut for British driver Damien Magee.
- This race marked the 25th podium finish for a Swiss driver.

== Championship standings after the race ==
Drivers' Championship standings

	Pos	Driver	Points
	1	(Austria) Niki Lauda	32
2	2	(Argentina) Carlos Reutemann	22
1	3	(Brazil) Emerson Fittipaldi	21
1	4	(Brazil) Carlos Pace	16
	5	(South Africa) Jody Scheckter	15

Constructors' Championship standings

	Pos	Constructor	Points
2	1	(Italy) Ferrari	35
1	2	(United Kingdom) Brabham-Ford	33 (35)
1	3	(United Kingdom) McLaren-Ford	26.5
	4	(United Kingdom) Tyrrell-Ford	19
	5	(United Kingdom) Hesketh-Ford	7

- Note: Only the top five positions are included for both sets of standings. Only the best 6 results from the first 7 races and the best 6 results from the last 7 races counted towards the Championship. Numbers without parentheses are Championship points; numbers in parentheses are total points scored.

Previous race: 1975 Belgian Grand Prix	FIA Formula One World Championship; 1975 season	Next race: 1975 Dutch Grand Prix
Previous race: 1974 Swedish Grand Prix	Swedish Grand Prix	Next race: 1976 Swedish Grand Prix
