= 1975 French Grand Prix =

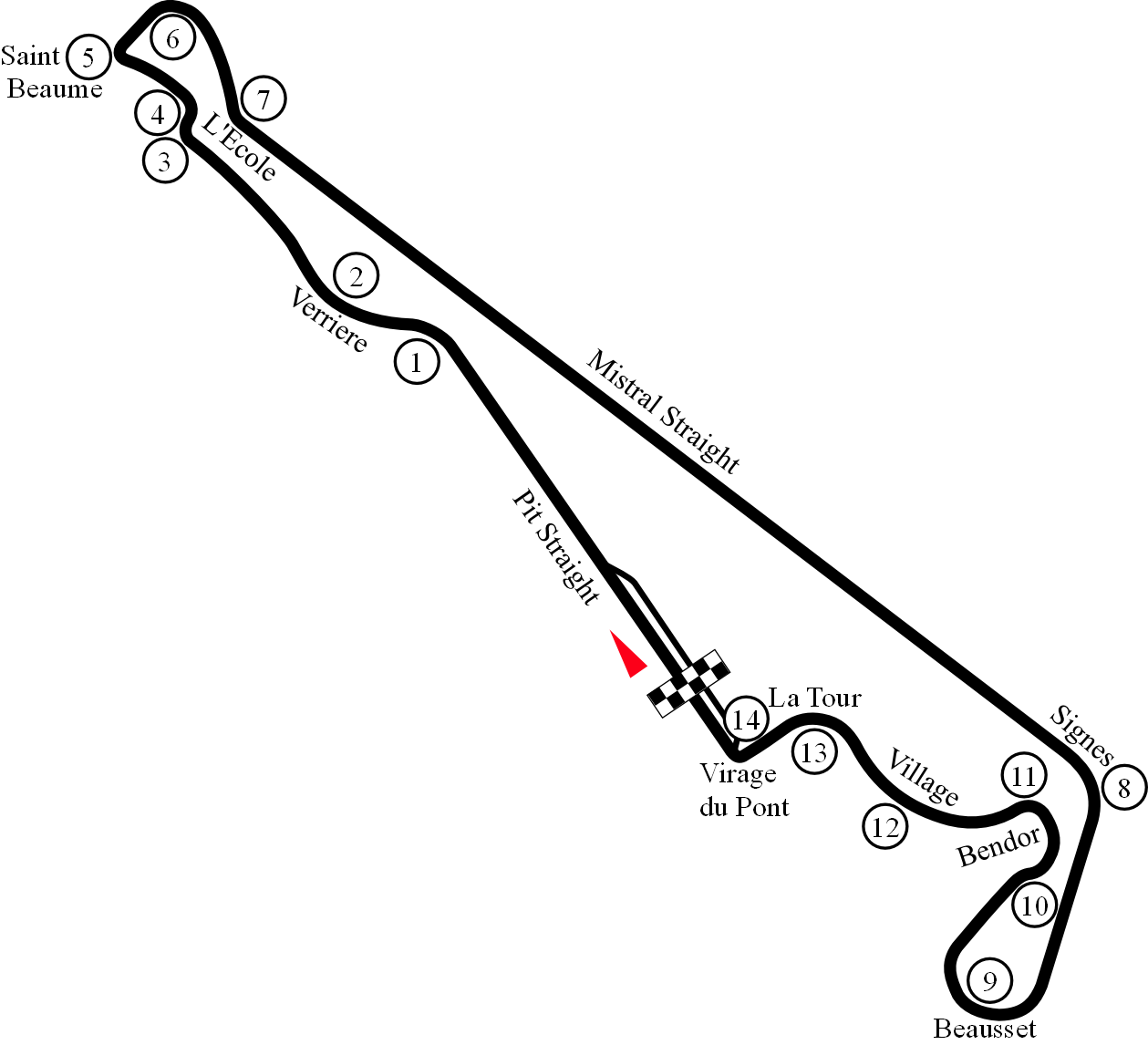

Race details
- Date: 6 July 1975
- Official name: 61ème Grand Prix de France
- Location: Circuit Paul Ricard; Le Castellet, Var, France
- Course: Permanent racing facility
- Course length: 5.809 km (3.610 miles)
- Distance: 54 laps, 313.686 km (194.915 miles)
- Weather: Dry and sunny

Pole position
Driver	(Austria) Niki Lauda	Ferrari
- Time: 1:47.82

Fastest lap
Driver	(West Germany) Jochen Mass	McLaren-Ford
- Time: 1:50.60 on lap 38

Podium
First	(Austria) Niki Lauda	Ferrari
Second	(United Kingdom) James Hunt	Hesketh-Ford
Third	(West Germany) Jochen Mass	McLaren-Ford

The 1975 French Grand Prix was a Formula One motor race held at Paul Ricard on 6 July 1975. It was race 9 of 14 in both the 1975 World Championship of Drivers and the 1975 International Cup for Formula One Manufacturers. It was the 53rd French Grand Prix and the third to be held at Paul Ricard. The race was held over 54 laps of the 5.8-kilometre (3.6 mi) circuit for a race distance of 313 kilometres (194 mi).

The race was won from pole position by Austrian driver Niki Lauda, driving a Ferrari. Lauda led every lap and survived late charges from British driver James Hunt in the Hesketh-Ford and West German driver Jochen Mass in the McLaren-Ford, who finished 1.6 and 2.3 seconds behind respectively. It was Lauda's fourth win of the season, enabling him to extend his lead in the Drivers' Championship to 22 points over Brabham driver Carlos Reutemann.

== Race summary ==
Despite suffering from flu, Niki Lauda still took pole position. Jean-Pierre Jarier brought a smile to French faces by setting Friday's quickest time. Jody Scheckter driving the new lightweight Tyrrell 007 set a record through the speed trap of 190 mph.

On the start line, Tom Pryce was left without a clutch and retired shortly afterwards. Lauda led from Scheckter, James Hunt and Jochen Mass. Clay Regazzoni had moved up to second before his engine exploded, Scheckter taking over the position before Hunt passed him on lap eight. Lauda and Hunt maintained first and second whilst Scheckter, struggling with handling issues, had to concede to Mass and Emerson Fittipaldi.

Jarier made a superb pass on him and made a brave bid to catch Fittipaldi, but rev-limiter problems caused him to fall back with erratic power. Mario Andretti and Patrick Depailler were performing brilliantly, advancing from eleventh to fifth and 19th to sixth respectively.

Alan Jones was duelling with Ronnie Peterson and Carlos Reutemann when he spun into the catch fencing. Reutemann suffered from tyre problems and lost a lap, whilst John Watson suffered excess power and took to the escape road. Vittorio Brambilla retired with a damper problem, Wilson Fittipaldi blew his engine, and Jacky Ickx, Mark Donohue and Carlos Pace all broke their driveshafts. Mass was in rapid pursuit of Hunt and Lauda – by the last lap he was only 2.4 seconds behind them. However, a superb lapping manoeuvre gave Hunt the space he needed. On the last corner, Lauda slid offline, but held on to win by 1.6 seconds.

== Classification ==
=== Qualifying classification ===
Pos.	No	Driver	Constructor	Time	Gap
1	12	(Austria) Niki Lauda	Ferrari	1:47.82	
2	3	(South Africa) Jody Scheckter	Tyrrell-Ford	1:48.22	+0.40
3	24	(United Kingdom) James Hunt	Hesketh-Ford	1:48.25	+0.43
4	17	(France) Jean-Pierre Jarier	Shadow-Ford	1:48.44	+0.62
5	8	(Brazil) Carlos Pace	Brabham-Ford	1:48.48	+0.66
6	16	(United Kingdom) Tom Pryce	Shadow-Ford	1:48.48	+0.66
7	2	(West Germany) Jochen Mass	McLaren-Ford	1:48.54	+0.72
8	9	(Italy) Vittorio Brambilla	March-Ford	1:48.56	+0.74
9	11	(Switzerland) Clay Regazzoni	Ferrari	1:48.68	+0.86
10	1	(Brazil) Emerson Fittipaldi	McLaren-Ford	1:48.75	+0.93
11	7	(Argentina) Carlos Reutemann	Brabham-Ford	1:48.85	+1.03
12	23	(United Kingdom) Tony Brise	Hill-Ford	1:49.21	+1.39
13	4	(France) Patrick Depailler	Tyrrell-Ford	1:49.31	+1.49
14	18	(United Kingdom) John Watson	Surtees-Ford	1:49.70	+1.88
15	27	(United States) Mario Andretti	Parnelli-Ford	1:49.72	+1.90
16	21	(France) Jacques Laffite	Williams-Ford	1:49.72	+1.90
17	5	(Sweden) Ronnie Peterson	Lotus-Ford	1:50.04	+2.22
18	28	(United States) Mark Donohue	Penske-Ford	1:50.15	+2.33
19	6	(Belgium) Jacky Ickx	Lotus-Ford	1:50.94	+3.12
20	22	(Australia) Alan Jones	Hill-Ford	1:51.02	+3.20
21	15	(France) Jean-Pierre Jabouille	Tyrrell-Ford	1:51.06	+3.24
22	31	(Netherlands) Gijs van Lennep	Ensign-Ford	1:51.21	+3.39
23	30	(Brazil) Wilson Fittipaldi	Fittipaldi-Ford	1:51.64	+3.82
24	20	(France) François Migault	Williams-Ford	1:51.82	+4.00
25	14	(United Kingdom) Bob Evans	BRM	1:51.85	+4.03
26	10	(Italy) Lella Lombardi	March-Ford	1:52.97	+5.15

=== Race classification ===
Pos	No	Driver	Constructor	Laps	Time/Retired	Grid	Points
1	12	(Austria) Niki Lauda	Ferrari	54	1:40:18.84	1	9
2	24	(United Kingdom) James Hunt	Hesketh-Ford	54	+ 1.59	3	6
3	2	(West Germany) Jochen Mass	McLaren-Ford	54	+ 2.31	7	4
4	1	(Brazil) Emerson Fittipaldi	McLaren-Ford	54	+ 39.77	10	3
5	27	(United States) Mario Andretti	Parnelli-Ford	54	+ 1:02.08	15	2
6	4	(France) Patrick Depailler	Tyrrell-Ford	54	+ 1:07.40	13	1
7	23	(United Kingdom) Tony Brise	Hill-Ford	54	+ 1:09.61	12	
8	17	(France) Jean-Pierre Jarier	Shadow-Ford	54	+ 1:19.78	4	
9	3	(South Africa) Jody Scheckter	Tyrrell-Ford	54	+ 1:31.68	2	
10	5	(Sweden) Ronnie Peterson	Lotus-Ford	54	+ 1:36.02	17	
11	21	(France) Jacques Laffite	Williams-Ford	54	+ 1:36.77	16	
12	15	(France) Jean-Pierre Jabouille	Tyrrell-Ford	54	+ 1:37.13	21	
13	18	(United Kingdom) John Watson	Surtees-Ford	53	+ 1 Lap	14	
14	7	(Argentina) Carlos Reutemann	Brabham-Ford	53	+ 1 Lap	11	
15	31	(Netherlands) Gijs van Lennep	Ensign-Ford	53	+ 1 Lap	22	
16	22	(Australia) Alan Jones	Hill-Ford	53	+ 1 Lap	20	
17	14	(United Kingdom) Bob Evans	BRM	52	+ 2 Laps	25	
18	10	(Italy) Lella Lombardi	March-Ford	50	+ 4 Laps	26	
Ret	8	(Brazil) Carlos Pace	Brabham-Ford	26	Transmission	5	
Ret	6	(Belgium) Jacky Ickx	Lotus-Ford	17	Brakes	19	
Ret	30	(Brazil) Wilson Fittipaldi	Fittipaldi-Ford	14	Engine	23	
Ret	9	(Italy) Vittorio Brambilla	March-Ford	6	Chassis	8	
Ret	11	(Switzerland) Clay Regazzoni	Ferrari	6	Engine	9	
Ret	28	(United States) Mark Donohue	Penske-Ford	6	Transmission	18	
Ret	16	(United Kingdom) Tom Pryce	Shadow-Ford	2	Transmission	6	
DNS	20	(France) François Migault	Williams-Ford	0	Non Starter	24	

== Championship standings after the race ==
Drivers' Championship standings

	Pos	Driver	Points
	1	(Austria) **Niki Lauda***	47
	2	(Argentina) **Carlos Reutemann***	25
	3	(Brazil) **Emerson Fittipaldi***	24
1	4	(United Kingdom) **James Hunt***	22
1	5	(Brazil) **Carlos Pace***	18

Constructors' Championship standings

	Pos	Constructor	Points
	1	(Italy) **Ferrari***	50
	2	(United Kingdom) **Brabham-Ford***	36 (38)
	3	(United Kingdom) **McLaren-Ford***	30.5
1	4	(United Kingdom) **Hesketh-Ford***	22
1	5	(United Kingdom) **Tyrrell-Ford***	20

- Note: Only the top five positions are included for both sets of standings. Only the best 6 results from the first 7 races and the best 6 results from the last 7 races counted towards the Championship. Numbers without parentheses are Championship points; numbers in parentheses are total points scored.
- Competitors in bold and marked with an asterisk still had a theoretical chance of becoming World Champion.

Previous race: 1975 Dutch Grand Prix	FIA Formula One World Championship; 1975 season	Next race: 1975 British Grand Prix
Previous race: 1974 French Grand Prix	French Grand Prix	Next race: 1976 French Grand Prix
