= 1975 German Grand Prix =

Race details
- Date: 3 August 1975
- Official name: XXXVII Großer Preis von Deutschland
- Location: Nürburgring, Nürburg, West Germany
- Course: Permanent racing facility
- Course length: 22.835 km (14.189 miles)
- Distance: 14 laps, 319.690 km (198.646 miles)
- Weather: Dry and sunny

Pole position
Driver	(Austria) Niki Lauda	Ferrari
- Time: 6:58.6

Fastest lap
Driver	(Switzerland) Clay Regazzoni	Ferrari
- Time: 7:06.4 on lap 7

Podium
First	(Argentina) Carlos Reutemann	Brabham-Ford
Second	(France) Jacques Laffite	Williams-Ford
Third	(Austria) Niki Lauda	Ferrari

The 1975 German Grand Prix was a Formula One motor race held at Nürburgring on 3 August 1975. It was race 11 of 14 in both the 1975 World Championship of Drivers and the 1975 International Cup for Formula One Manufacturers. It was the 37th German Grand Prix and the 34th to be held at the Nürburgring. The race was held over 14 laps of the 22.8-kilometre (14.2 mi) circuit for a race distance of 319 kilometres (198 mi).

The race was won by Argentinian driver Carlos Reutemann driving a Brabham BT44B his first win of the season. Reutemann won by 1 minute and 37 seconds over the Williams FW04 of French driver Jacques Laffite. It was a stunning result for Laffite, his first point scoring finish in Formula One. It was also the peak result for Frank Williams Racing Cars, the first Formula One team run by British team principal, Frank Williams. While it was the team's third podium result, it was the first and only podium they would achieve in one of their own cars, having previously achieved second places at the 1969 Monaco Grand Prix and the 1969 United States Grand Prix with a customer Brabham. 46 seconds further back in third position was world championship points leader, Niki Lauda driving a Ferrari 312T.

With Emerson Fittipaldi's McLaren M23 retiring with suspension damage, Lauda was able to expand his points lead to 17 points with Reutemann moving back into second place.

== Qualifying summary ==
The pole position time set by Niki Lauda (6:58.6) was the fastest officially timed lap ever on that track configuration, though it was not eligible as lap record as it did not occur during the race. Lauda's average speed was 122.238 mph (196.289 km/h). In qualifying, Ian Ashley had an accident at Pflanzgarten and suffered serious ankle injuries. Additional Armco and other safety measures were added to the track at the drivers' demands. The average speed remains the fastest lap average speed for any race on the Nordschleife.

Behind Lauda on pole was Carlos Pace in a Brabham, Jody Scheckter and Patrick Depailler in the Tyrrell cars, Clay Regazzoni in the second Ferrari, Jochen Mass in a McLaren, Hans-Joachim Stuck in a March, Emerson Fittipaldi in the other McLaren, James Hunt in his Hesketh and Carlos Reutemann in the second Brabham.

== Race summary ==
At the start, Lauda took the lead from pole with Pace, Depailler, Mass, Regazzoni and Reutemann who made a lightning start from 10th. Depailler passed Pace at the Nordkurve left hander. At the end of the first lap, the order was Lauda, Depailler, Pace, Reutemann, and Regazzoni. Scheckter had a terrible start, he dropped to 20th and began to work his way through the field. It was a bad day for the McLaren team, as sixth-placed Fittipaldi had a puncture and retired on lap 4 with damaged suspension; and Mass had lost a wheel at the Fuchsröhre (Foxhole) and crashed heavily, he was unhurt. March's day went rapidly south too: Stuck retired with engine failure on the fourth lap.

Regazzoni got past Reutemann on the third lap, and the order by the start of the fourth lap was Lauda, Depailler, Pace, Regazzoni, Reutemann, and Hunt. Lauda and Depailler battled and began to pull away from the other front-runners, and this battle raged on until the 7th lap, when Depailler had a puncture and went into the pits to repair his rear suspension; he went out again, but had lost a lap- which at the old Nürburgring, was more than 7 minutes of lost time. Pace went off with a puncture and damaged his suspension, he retired near the Karrusell on the 6th lap, and Scheckter- who had climbed to 6th, crashed out on the 8th lap.

Depailler and Pace's misfortunes allowed Regazzoni to come up to 2nd and make it a Ferrari 1–2, but then Regazzoni's engine failed and Reutemann took 2nd, with Hunt 3rd, Tom Pryce in the Shadow 4th and Jacques Laffite in the Williams in 5th (who started 17th and 15th respectively). But on the 10th lap, Lauda too suffered a puncture of his right front tire, and Reutemann was able to pass him at the Eiskurve and Hunt was able to get by as well later on. By the time Lauda had reached the pits, his car had sustained damage to the front spoiler, and the handling was made poor. The Ferrari team changed the damaged tire (pit stops in those days were extremely slow compared to today's pit stops; races were usually run on one set of tires). By the time the Ferrari team had finished their work, Lauda stormed out of the pits; but Reutemann and Hunt were out of sight; Pryce and Laffite had passed him, too.

Lauda charged after the 4 runners ahead of him and he climbed to 4th after Hunt had a wheel-hub failure and retired on the 11th lap; and then he was able to inherit 3rd after he passed Pryce, who had fuel leaking into his cockpit and could not drive at race pace. Reutemann, who was almost 2 minutes ahead of Laffite, who was nearly a minute ahead of Lauda – held onto the lead to record his only victory of the year; and became the first (and so far last) Argentine driver since Juan Manuel Fangio to win the German Grand Prix. Laffite finished second, which equalled the struggling Williams team's highest ever finish with Piers Courage in 1969; and Depailler, whom Lauda had been fighting for the lead with earlier and was a lap down in 9th place- caught up to and started to push Lauda and attempted unsuccessfully to unlap himself; he finished close behind Lauda's ill-handling 3rd-placed Ferrari. Pryce finished an excellent 4th, followed by Australian future world champion Alan Jones in Graham Hill's Embassy-Hill car, with Dutch Le Mans winner Gijs Van Lennep in an Ensign rounding out the last points finishing slot in 6th place.

With his victory, Reutemann moved into 2nd place in the championship, 1 point ahead of Fittipaldi, but 17 points behind Lauda; and with only 3 races left in the championship, Lauda's first championship looked to be virtually a lock.

== Classification ==
=== Qualifying ===
Pos	No.	Driver	Constructor	Time	Gap
1	12	(Austria) Niki Lauda	Ferrari	6:58.6	–
2	8	(Brazil) Carlos Pace	Brabham-Ford	7:00.0	+ 1.4
3	3	(South Africa) Jody Scheckter	Tyrrell-Ford	7:01.3	+ 2.7
4	4	(France) Patrick Depailler	Tyrrell-Ford	7:01.4	+ 2.8
5	11	(Switzerland) Clay Regazzoni	Ferrari	7:01.6	+ 3.0
6	2	(West Germany) Jochen Mass	McLaren-Ford	7:01.8	+ 3.2
7	10	(West Germany) Hans-Joachim Stuck	March-Ford	7:02.1	+ 3.5
8	1	(Brazil) Emerson Fittipaldi	McLaren-Ford	7:02.7	+ 4.1
9	24	(United Kingdom) James Hunt	Hesketh-Ford	7:02.7	+ 4.1
10	7	(Argentina) Carlos Reutemann	Brabham-Ford	7:04.0	+ 5.4
11	9	(Italy) Vittorio Brambilla	March-Ford	7:06.0	+ 7.4
12	17	(France) Jean-Pierre Jarier	Shadow-Ford	7:07.1	+ 8.5
13	27	(United States) Mario Andretti	Parnelli-Ford	7:08.2	+ 9.6
14	6	(United Kingdom) John Watson	Lotus-Ford	7:09.4	+ 10.8
15	21	(France) Jacques Laffite	Williams-Ford	7:10.0	+ 11.4
16	16	(United Kingdom) Tom Pryce	Shadow-Ford	7:10.1	+ 11.5
17	23	(United Kingdom) Tony Brise	Hill-Ford	7:10.9	+ 12.3
18	5	(Sweden) Ronnie Peterson	Lotus-Ford	7:11.6	+ 13.0
19	28	(United States) Mark Donohue	March-Ford	7:11.8	+ 13.2
20	20	(United Kingdom) Ian Ashley	Williams-Ford	7:15.9	+ 17.3
21	22	(Australia) Alan Jones	Hill-Ford	7:18.6	+ 20.0
22	30	(Brazil) Wilson Fittipaldi	Fittipaldi-Ford	7:19.1	+ 20.5
23	25	(Austria) Harald Ertl	Hesketh-Ford	7:19.5	+ 20.9
24	19	(Netherlands) Gijs van Lennep	Ensign-Ford	7:20.4	+ 21.8
25	14	(Italy) Lella Lombardi	March-Ford	7:36.4	+ 37.8
26	35	(United Kingdom) Tony Trimmer	Maki-Ford	7:43.1	+ 44.5

*Positions in red indicate entries that failed to qualify.

=== Race ===
Pos	No	Driver	Constructor	Laps	Time/Retired	Grid	Points
1	7	(Argentina) Carlos Reutemann	Brabham-Ford	14	1:41:14.1	10	9
2	21	(France) Jacques Laffite	Williams-Ford	14	+ 1:37.7	15	6
3	12	(Austria) Niki Lauda	Ferrari	14	+ 2:23.3	1	4
4	16	(United Kingdom) Tom Pryce	Shadow-Ford	14	+ 3:31.4	16	3
5	22	(Australia) Alan Jones	Hill-Ford	14	+ 3:50.3	21	2
6	19	(Netherlands) Gijs van Lennep	Ensign-Ford	14	+ 5:05.5	24	1
7	29	(Italy) Lella Lombardi	March-Ford	14	+ 7:30.4	25	
8	25	(Austria) Harald Ertl	Hesketh-Ford	14	+ 7:40.9	23	
9	4	(France) Patrick Depailler	Tyrrell-Ford	13	+ 1 Lap	4	
10	27	(United States) Mario Andretti	Parnelli-Ford	12	Out of fuel	13	
Ret	24	(United Kingdom) James Hunt	Hesketh-Ford	10	Wheel	9	
Ret	11	(Switzerland) Clay Regazzoni	Ferrari	9	Engine	5	
Ret	23	(United Kingdom) Tony Brise	Hill-Ford	9	Accident	17	
Ret	3	(South Africa) Jody Scheckter	Tyrrell-Ford	7	Accident	3	
Ret	17	(France) Jean-Pierre Jarier	Shadow-Ford	7	Tyre	12	
Ret	8	(Brazil) Carlos Pace	Brabham-Ford	5	Suspension	2	
Ret	30	(Brazil) Wilson Fittipaldi	Fittipaldi-Ford	4	Engine	22	
Ret	10	(West Germany) Hans-Joachim Stuck	March-Ford	3	Engine	7	
Ret	1	(Brazil) Emerson Fittipaldi	McLaren-Ford	3	Suspension	8	
Ret	9	(Italy) Vittorio Brambilla	March-Ford	3	Suspension	11	
Ret	6	(United Kingdom) John Watson	Lotus-Ford	2	Suspension	14	
Ret	5	(Sweden) Ronnie Peterson	Lotus-Ford	1	Clutch	18	
Ret	28	(United States) Mark Donohue	March-Ford	1	Tyre	19	
Ret	2	(West Germany) Jochen Mass	McLaren-Ford	0	Accident	6	
DNS	20	(United Kingdom) Ian Ashley	Williams-Ford		Accident	20	
DNQ	35	(United Kingdom) Tony Trimmer	Maki-Ford		Suspension		

== Notes ==
- This was the Formula One World Championship debut for Austrian driver Harald Ertl and British driver Tony Trimmer.
- This was the 25th pole position by an Austrian driver.
- This race marked the 50th podium finish for a French driver.
- This was the 10th Grand Prix start for a Williams. This race also marked their first podium finish.

== Championship standings after the race ==
Drivers' Championship standings

	Pos	Driver	Points
	1	(Austria) **Niki Lauda***	51
2	2	(Argentina) **Carlos Reutemann***	34
1	3	(Brazil) **Emerson Fittipaldi***	33
1	4	(United Kingdom) **James Hunt***	25
	5	(Brazil) Carlos Pace	24

Constructors' Championship standings

Pos	Constructor	Points
1	(Italy) **Ferrari***	54
2	(United Kingdom) **Brabham-Ford***	51 (53)
3	(United Kingdom) **McLaren-Ford***	39.5
4	(United Kingdom) Hesketh-Ford	25
5	(United Kingdom) Tyrrell-Ford	24

- Note: Only the top five positions are included for both sets of standings. Only the best 6 results from the first 7 races and the best 6 results from the last 7 races counted towards the Championship. Numbers without parentheses are Championship points; numbers in parentheses are total points scored.
- Competitors in bold and marked with an asterisk still had a theoretical chance of becoming World Champion.

Previous race: 1975 British Grand Prix	FIA Formula One World Championship; 1975 season	Next race: 1975 Austrian Grand Prix
Previous race: 1974 German Grand Prix	German Grand Prix	Next race: 1976 German Grand Prix
