= 1975 Belgian Grand Prix =

Race details
- Date: May 25, 1975
- Location: Circuit Zolder, Heusden-Zolder, Belgium
- Course length: 4.262 km (2.648 miles)
- Distance: 70 laps, 298.340 km (185.380 miles)
- Weather: Dry and sunny

Pole position
Driver	(Austria) Niki Lauda	Ferrari
- Time: 1:25.43

Fastest lap
Driver	(Switzerland) Clay Regazzoni	Ferrari
- Time: 1:26.76 on lap 11

Podium
First	(Austria) Niki Lauda	Ferrari
Second	(South Africa) Jody Scheckter	Tyrrell-Ford
Third	(Argentina) Carlos Reutemann	Brabham-Ford

The 1975 Belgian Grand Prix was a Formula One motor race held at Zolder on 25 May 1975. It was race 6 of 14 in both the 1975 World Championship of Drivers and the 1975 International Cup for Formula One Manufacturers. It was the 33rd Belgian Grand Prix and the second to be held at the Circuit Zolder. The race was held over 70 laps of the four kilometre venue for a race distance of 280 kilometres.

The race was won by Austrian driver Niki Lauda driving a Ferrari 312T, his second victory for the year after winning Monaco two weeks earlier. Lauda led 65 of the 70 laps, taking a 19-second victory over South African driver Jody Scheckter in a Tyrrell 007. Argentinian driver Carlos Reutemann drove his Brabham BT44B to third place. The win put Lauda into the lead of the championship for the first time in 1975, passing previous leader Emerson Fittipaldi.

== Qualifying summary ==
Ferrari arrived at Circuit Zolder eager for the fray and buoyed up by their Monaco victory. Niki Lauda dutifully gained pole after a technical gremlin held up early leader Carlos Pace and Saturday's qualifying was rained out. Vittorio Brambilla was third on the grid and Tony Brise stunned on his debut race for Graham Hill, gaining a fourth-row start ahead of Championship leader Emerson Fittipaldi. Ronnie Peterson suffered the unfortunate experience of being given a parking ticket during the practice session – after having parked his car in a dangerous position at the edge of the track, rather than risk a puncture by pulling into the gravel trap. Mario Andretti was missing from the field because he was competing at the Indianapolis 500.

== Qualifying classification ==
Pos.	Driver	Constructor	Time	No
1	Niki Lauda	Ferrari	1:25,43	1
2	Carlos Pace	Brabham-Ford	1:25,47	2
3	Vittorio Brambilla	March-Ford	1:25,66	3
4	Clay Regazzoni	Ferrari	1:25,85	4
5	Tom Pryce	Shadow-Ford	1:25,94	5
6	Carlos Reutemann	Brabham-Ford	1:26,09	6
7	Tony Brise	Hill-Ford	1:26,22	7
8	Emerson Fittipaldi	McLaren-Ford	1:26,26	8
9	Jody Scheckter	Tyrrell-Ford	1:26,36	9
10	Jean-Pierre Jarier	Shadow-Ford	1:26,38	10
11	James Hunt	Hesketh-Ford	1:26,51	11
12	Patrick Depailler	Tyrrell-Ford	1:26,74	12
13	Alan Jones	Hesketh-Ford	1:27,05	13
14	Ronnie Peterson	Lotus-Ford	1:27,17	14
15	Jochen Mass	McLaren-Ford	1:27,38	15
16	Jacky Ickx	Lotus-Ford	1:27,40	16
17	Jacques Laffite	Williams-Ford	1:27,70	17
18	John Watson	Surtees-Ford	1:28,01	18
19	Arturo Merzario	Williams-Ford	1:28,18	19
20	Bob Evans	BRM	1:28,57	20
21	Mark Donohue	Penske-Ford	1:28,65	21
22	François Migault	Hill-Ford	1:29,57	22
23	Lella Lombardi	March-Ford	1:29,71	23
24	Wilson Fittipaldi	Fittipaldi-Ford	1:30,27	24

== Race summary ==
Pace took the lead whilst Brambilla and Regazzoni duelled. Jochen Mass and John Watson collided – the German retired whilst Watson returned to the pits with a damaged nosecone. Alan Jones also had to retire after a collision with Jacques Laffite. Arturo Merzario was out with a burnt out clutch. Pace's fiery start was now causing problems with brakes and cold tyres and he was having to drop back.

Brambilla took the lead until lap six when he was passed by Lauda. Tony Brise spun at the chicane and retired shortly after with piston failure. Jody Scheckter was storming through the field to be in second place by lap nine. Brambilla's brakes were fading and he dropped down the order. Jean-Pierre Jarier spun into the catch-fencing, James Hunt retired with a broken gear-linkage. Clay Regazzoni had risen to third, but then dived into the pits to change a blistered tyre. Lauda led Scheckter comfortably and the race settled down into a procession.

Carlos Pace had handling problems and dropped down the order when he lost third gear. By lap 49, Ronnie Peterson crashed into the catch fencing, whilst Brambilla surrendered third place to change a blistered tyre, resuming but retiring with brake problems.

Fittipaldi was also having brake problems, leaving him helpless against the assault of Regazzoni and Tom Pryce as he dropped from fifth to seventh in the last six laps.

== Classification ==
Pos	No	Driver	Constructor	Laps	Time/Retired	Grid	Points
1	12	(Austria) Niki Lauda	Ferrari	70	1:43:53.98	1	9
2	3	(South Africa) Jody Scheckter	Tyrrell-Ford	70	+ 19.22	9	6
3	7	(Argentina) Carlos Reutemann	Brabham-Ford	70	+ 41.82	6	4
4	4	(France) Patrick Depailler	Tyrrell-Ford	70	+ 1:00.08	12	3
5	11	(Switzerland) Clay Regazzoni	Ferrari	70	+ 1:03.84	4	2
6	16	(United Kingdom) Tom Pryce	Shadow-Ford	70	+ 1:28.45	5	1
7	1	(Brazil) Emerson Fittipaldi	McLaren-Ford	69	+ 1 Lap	8	
8	8	(Brazil) Carlos Pace	Brabham-Ford	69	+ 1 Lap	2	
9	14	(United Kingdom) Bob Evans	BRM	68	+ 2 Laps	20	
10	18	(United Kingdom) John Watson	Surtees-Ford	68	+ 2 Laps	18	
11	28	(United States) Mark Donohue	Penske-Ford	67	+ 3 Laps	21	
12	30	(Brazil) Wilson Fittipaldi	Fittipaldi-Ford	67	+ 3 Laps	24	
Ret	22	(France) François Migault	Hill-Ford	57	Suspension	22	
Ret	9	(Italy) Vittorio Brambilla	March-Ford	54	Brakes	3	
Ret	6	(Belgium) Jacky Ickx	Lotus-Ford	52	Brakes	16	
Ret	5	(Sweden) Ronnie Peterson	Lotus-Ford	36	Brakes	14	
Ret	21	(France) Jacques Laffite	Williams-Ford	18	Gearbox	23	
Ret	10	(Italy) Lella Lombardi	March-Ford	18	Engine	17	
Ret	23	(United Kingdom) Tony Brise	Hill-Ford	17	Engine	7	
Ret	24	(United Kingdom) James Hunt	Hesketh-Ford	15	Transmission	11	
Ret	17	(France) Jean-Pierre Jarier	Shadow-Ford	13	Spun Off	10	
Ret	20	(Italy) Arturo Merzario	Williams-Ford	2	Clutch	19	
Ret	26	(Australia) Alan Jones	Hesketh-Ford	1	Accident	13	
Ret	2	(Germany) Jochen Mass	McLaren-Ford	0	Accident	15	
WD	31	(Netherlands) Roelof Wunderink	Ensign-Ford				
WD	35	(Australia) Dave Walker	Maki-Ford				

== Notes ==
- This was the 200th race in which an American driver participated. In those 200 races, American drivers won 22 Grands Prix, achieved 99 podium finishes, 22 pole positions, 28 fastest laps, 4 Grand Slams and won 1 World Championship.
- This was also the 100th race in which an Argentinian driver participated. In those 100 races, Argentinian drivers won 29 Grands Prix, achieved 65 podium finishes, 34 pole positions, 28 fastest laps, 9 Grand Slams and 5 World Championships.
- This race also marked the 10th Grand Prix win for an Austrian driver.
- This race was the 6th win of the Belgian Grand Prix for Ferrari, breaking the previous record set by Lotus at the 1972 Belgian Grand Prix.
- It was also the 6th win of the Belgian Grand Prix for a Ferrari-powered car, equally breaking the previous record set by Coventry Climax at the 1965 Belgian Grand Prix.

== Championship standings after the race ==
Drivers' Championship standings

	Pos	Driver	Points
2	1	(Austria) Niki Lauda	23
1	2	(Brazil) Emerson Fittipaldi	21
1	3	(Brazil) Carlos Pace	16
	4	(Argentina) Carlos Reutemann	16
1	5	(South Africa) Jody Scheckter	15

Constructors' Championship standings

	Pos	Constructor	Points
1	1	(United Kingdom) Brabham-Ford	29
1	2	(United Kingdom) McLaren-Ford	26.5
	3	(Italy) Ferrari	26
	4	(United Kingdom) Tyrrell-Ford	19
	5	(United Kingdom) Hesketh-Ford	7

- Note: Only the top five positions are included for both sets of standings.

Previous race: 1975 Monaco Grand Prix	FIA Formula One World Championship; 1975 season	Next race: 1975 Swedish Grand Prix
Previous race: 1974 Belgian Grand Prix	Belgian Grand Prix	Next race: 1976 Belgian Grand Prix
