= 1975 Monaco Grand Prix =

Coordinates: 43°44′4.74″N 7°25′16.8″E

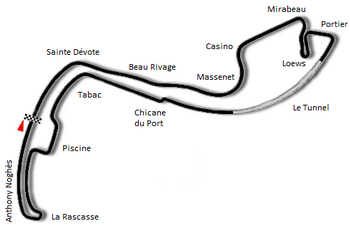

Race details
- Date: 11 May 1975
- Official name: XXXIII Gran Prix de Monaco
- Location: Circuit de Monaco, Monte Carlo, Monaco
- Course: Street circuit
- Course length: 3.278 km (2.037 miles)
- Distance: 75 laps, 245.850 km (152.764 miles)
- Scheduled distance: 78 laps, 255.684 km (158.874 miles)
- Weather: Rain, later drying

Pole position
Driver	(Austria) Niki Lauda	Ferrari
- Time: 1:26.40

Fastest lap
Driver	(France) Patrick Depailler	Tyrrell-Ford
- Time: 1:28.67 on lap 68

Podium
First	(Austria) Niki Lauda	Ferrari
Second	(Brazil) Emerson Fittipaldi	McLaren-Ford
Third	(Brazil) Carlos Pace	Brabham-Ford

The 1975 Monaco Grand Prix was a Formula One motor race held in Monaco on 11 May 1975. It was race 5 of 14 in both the 1975 World Championship of Drivers and the 1975 International Cup for Formula One Manufacturers. It was the 33rd Monaco Grand Prix since the race was first held in 1929. It was held over 75 of the scheduled 78 laps of the three kilometre street circuit, for a race distance of 245 kilometres.

The race was won by Austrian driver Niki Lauda giving the new Ferrari 312T its first win. The win broke a 20-year drought at Monaco for Ferrari. Lauda dominated the race, only losing the lead during a pitstop. He won by two seconds over the McLaren M23 of Emerson Fittipaldi. Carlos Pace finished third in his Brabham BT44B. This was also the 179th and final Grand Prix for 1962 and 1968 World Champion Graham Hill, although he failed to qualify after 176 race starts.

== Circuit changes and qualifying summary ==
The future of Grand Prix racing was under scrutiny following the disastrous Spanish Grand Prix held two weeks prior. Actions had to be taken quickly: extra guard rails and catch fences were erected, kerbing resited and the chicane was modified. New measures were introduced: the grid was staggered and in addition would be restricted to just 18 cars. This last change affected Graham Hill's chance to qualify: the five-time Monaco winner had all sorts of practice problems and failed to qualify by 0.377 seconds. John Watson and Clay Regazzoni collided in practice, whilst the Surtees team was ordered to remove pro-Europe political stickers from its cars.

After failing his qualifying attempt for the start, Hill announced his retirement as a driver after 17 seasons and 176 races to concentrate on his Embassy Hill team.

Niki Lauda, in a Ferrari, claimed pole position, but sensationally sharing the front row was Tom Pryce, driving a Shadow, who just 12 months earlier had been deemed 'too inexperienced' to compete. Jean-Pierre Jarier and Ronnie Peterson filled the second row.

== Race summary ==
The race began under rain conditions, so everyone went for wet tyres. Lauda was fastest at the start, while Pryce had a slow start and was passed by Jarier and Peterson; the Frenchman soon attempted to pass Lauda in an ill-advised overtaking manoeuvre, and hit the barriers at the Mirabeau; his car was damaged in the collision and handled badly, which caused him to hit the wall again at the Tabac corner and then retire. Peterson went into the second place with Vittorio Brambilla third, until Pryce hit the Italian's wheel. Regazzoni stopped to change a tyre and the nosecone of his car, and James Hunt stopped to change onto slick tyres, anticipating a drying of the track surface. However, his team's slow pit work cost him a substantial amount of time.

Ronnie Peterson's victory chances were damaged at his pit stop when a wheel nut was lost under the car. Tom Pryce came in to replace a broken nosecone, and by that time Niki Lauda led by 15 seconds from Emerson Fittipaldi and Carlos Pace. Many accidents happened during the race: Jochen Mass and James Hunt tangled at Mirabeau, and Patrick Depailler got embroiled in their accident; Clay Regazzoni hit the chicane and suffered damage; John Watson spun and stalled the engine of his car; Pryce hit the barrier and had to retire; Mario Andretti entered the pits with his car on fire; Mark Donohue hit the barrier, whilst Alan Jones broke a wheel.

In the last laps Lauda's oil pressure was fading and Fittipaldi was closing. With three laps left the gap was 2.75 seconds; however, the two-hour time limit was reached and the race was stopped, with Lauda winning. Ferrari had won their first Monaco Grand Prix in 20 years; the tragedy of the Spanish Grand Prix receded and the championship race was back on. Fittipaldi's second position strengthened his narrow points lead over early season points leader Pace.

== Classification ==
=== Qualifying classification ===
Pos.	Driver	Constructor	Time	No
1	Niki Lauda	Ferrari	1:26,40	1
2	Tom Pryce	Shadow-Ford	1:27,09	2
3	Jean-Pierre Jarier	Shadow-Ford	1:27,25	3
4	Ronnie Peterson	Lotus-Ford	1:27,40	4
5	Vittorio Brambilla	March-Ford	1:27,50	5
6	Clay Regazzoni	Ferrari	1:27,55	6
7	Jody Scheckter	Tyrrell-Ford	1:27,58	7
8	Carlos Pace	Brabham-Ford	1:27,67	8
9	Emerson Fittipaldi	McLaren-Ford	1:27,77	9
10	Carlos Reutemann	Brabham-Ford	1:27,93	10
11	James Hunt	Hesketh-Ford	1:27,94	11
12	Patrick Depailler	Tyrrell-Ford	1:27,95	12
13	Mario Andretti	Parnelli-Ford	1:28,11	13
14	Jacky Ickx	Lotus-Ford	1:28,28	14
15	Jochen Mass	McLaren-Ford	1:28,49	15
16	Mark Donohue	Penske-Ford	1:28,81	16
17	John Watson	Surtees-Ford	1:28,90	17
18	Alan Jones	Hesketh-Ford	1:29,12	18
19	Jacques Laffite	Williams-Ford	1:29,28	—
20	Arturo Merzario	Williams-Ford	1:29,32	—
21	Graham Hill	Hill-Ford	1:29,49	—
22	Bob Evans	BRM	1:30,33	—
23	Roelof Wunderink	Ensign-Ford	1:31,60	—
24	Torsten Palm	Hesketh-Ford	1:31,95	—
25	Lella Lombardi	March-Ford	1:32,20	—
26	Wilson Fittipaldi	Fittipaldi-Ford	1:33,02	—

*Positions in red indicate entries that failed to qualify.

=== Race classification ===
Pos	No	Driver	Constructor	Laps	Time/Retired	Grid	Points
1	12	(Austria) Niki Lauda	Ferrari	75	2:01:21.31	1	9
2	1	(Brazil) Emerson Fittipaldi	McLaren-Ford	75	+ 2.78	9	6
3	8	(Brazil) Carlos Pace	Brabham-Ford	75	+ 17.81	8	4
4	5	(Sweden) Ronnie Peterson	Lotus-Ford	75	+ 38.45	4	3
5	4	(France) Patrick Depailler	Tyrrell-Ford	75	+ 40.86	12	2
6	2	(West Germany) Jochen Mass	McLaren-Ford	75	+ 42.07	15	1
7	3	(South Africa) Jody Scheckter	Tyrrell-Ford	74	+ 1 Lap	7	
8	6	(Belgium) Jacky Ickx	Lotus-Ford	74	+ 1 Lap	14	
9	7	(Argentina) Carlos Reutemann	Brabham-Ford	73	+ 2 Laps	10	
Ret	28	(United States) Mark Donohue	Penske-Ford	66	Accident	16	
Ret	24	(United Kingdom) James Hunt	Hesketh-Ford	63	Accident	11	
Ret	26	(Australia) Alan Jones	Hesketh-Ford	61	Wheel	18	
Ret	9	(Italy) Vittorio Brambilla	March-Ford	48	Accident	5	
Ret	16	(United Kingdom) Tom Pryce	Shadow-Ford	39	Accident	2	
Ret	11	(Switzerland) Clay Regazzoni	Ferrari	36	Accident	17	
Ret	18	(United Kingdom) John Watson	Surtees-Ford	36	Spun off	6	
Ret	27	(United States) Mario Andretti	Parnelli-Ford	9	Oil leak	13	
Ret	17	(France) Jean-Pierre Jarier	Shadow-Ford	0	Accident	3	
DNQ	21	(France) Jacques Laffite	Williams-Ford				
DNQ	20	(Italy) Arturo Merzario	Williams-Ford				
DNQ	23	(United Kingdom) Graham Hill	Hill-Ford; Lola-Ford				
DNQ	14	(United Kingdom) Bob Evans	BRM				
DNQ	31	(Netherlands) Roelof Wunderink	Ensign-Ford				
DNQ	25	(Sweden) Torsten Palm	Hesketh-Ford				
DNQ	10	(Italy) Lella Lombardi	March-Ford				
DNQ	30	(Brazil) Wilson Fittipaldi	Fittipaldi-Ford				

== Notes ==
- This was the Formula One World Championship debut for Swedish driver Torsten Palm.

== Championship standings after the race ==
Drivers' Championship standings

	Pos	Driver	Points
	1	(Brazil) Emerson Fittipaldi	21
	2	(Brazil) Carlos Pace	16
6	3	(Austria) Niki Lauda	14
1	4	(Argentina) Carlos Reutemann	12
1	5	(Germany) Jochen Mass	10.5

Constructors' Championship standings

	Pos	Constructor	Points
1	1	(United Kingdom) McLaren-Ford	26.5
1	2	(United Kingdom) Brabham-Ford	25
1	3	(Italy) Ferrari	17
1	4	(United Kingdom) Tyrrell-Ford	13
	5	(United Kingdom) Hesketh-Ford	7

- Note: Only the top five positions are included for both sets of standings.

Previous race: 1975 Spanish Grand Prix	FIA Formula One World Championship; 1975 season	Next race: 1975 Belgian Grand Prix
Previous race: 1974 Monaco Grand Prix	Monaco Grand Prix	Next race: 1976 Monaco Grand Prix
Awards
Preceded by None	Formula One Promotional Trophy for Race Promoter; 1975	Succeeded by 1976 United States Grand Prix West
