= Guy Tunmer =

South African racing driver (1948–1999)

- Born: 1 December 1948; Ficksburg, South Africa
- Died: 22 June 1999 (aged 50); Sandton, South Africa

Formula One World Championship career
- Nationality: (South Africa) South African
- Active years: 1975
- Team: non-works Lotus
- Entries: 1
- Championships: 0
- Wins: 0
- Podiums: 0
- Career points: 0
- Pole positions: 0
- Fastest laps: 0
- First entry: 1975 South African Grand Prix

Percival Guy Tunmer (1 December 1948 – 22 June 1999) was a racing driver from South Africa. He participated in one Formula One World Championship Grand Prix, his home race in 1975, driving a Lotus 72 for a local team, Team Gunston. He finished 11th, scoring no championship points. He later found success in Formula Atlantic.

Tunmer was killed in a motorcycle accident in his native South Africa in 1999.

== Complete Formula One World Championship results ==
(key)

Year	Entrant	Chassis	Engine	1	2	3	4	5	6	7	8	9	10	11	12	13	14	WDC	Points
1975	Team Gunston	Lotus 72	Cosworth V8	ARG	BRA	RSA; 11	ESP	MON	BEL	SWE	NED	FRA	GBR	GER	AUT	ITA	USA	NC	0
