= Torsten Palm =

Swedish racing driver (born 1947)

- Born: 23 July 1947 (age 79); Kristinehamn, Sweden

Formula One World Championship career
- Nationality: (Sweden) Swedish
- Active years: 1975
- Team: non-works Hesketh
- Entries: 2 (1 start)
- Championships: 0
- Wins: 0
- Podiums: 0
- Career points: 0
- Pole positions: 0
- Fastest laps: 0
- First entry: 1975 Monaco Grand Prix
- Last entry: 1975 Swedish Grand Prix

Torsten Palm (born 23 July 1947) is a former racing driver from Sweden.

== Racing career ==
The younger brother of famous rally co-driver Gunnar Palm, Torsten competed as a co-driver as well. In 1967, he came second in the Swedish Rally with Simo Lampinen.

Palm competed internationally in formula racing and rallies. He made his debut in Formula 3 in 1969 and came second to Ronnie Peterson in the Swedish Championship that year, before winning the Championship in 1970 and 1971. He made his Formula 1 debut in a Hesketh in 1975. In Monaco, he failed to qualify for the race. In Anderstorp, Sweden, he qualified for the race and finished tenth.

From 1993-2003, Palm ran a car dealership, Torsten Palm Bil AB, which was the representative for Ferrari for three years.

== Complete Formula One results ==
(key)

Year	Entrant	Chassis	Engine	1	2	3	4	5	6	7	8	9	10	11	12	13	14	WDC	Points
1975	Polar Caravans	Hesketh 308	Cosworth V8	ARG	BRA	RSA	ESP	MON; DNQ	BEL	SWE; 10	NED	FRA	GBR	GER	AUT	ITA	USA	NC	0

Sporting positions
Preceded by Ronnie Peterson	Swedish Formula Three Champion; 1970-1971	Succeeded by Conny Andersson
