= 1975 Swiss Grand Prix =

- Non-championship race in the 1975 Formula One season
- Dijon-Prenois Circuit

Race details
- Date: 24 August 1975
- Official name: Swiss Grand Prix
- Location: Dijon-Prenois, Dijon, France
- Course: Permanent racing facility
- Course length: 3.289 km (2.044 miles)
- Distance: 60 laps, 197.34 km (122.64 miles)
- Weather: Dry

Pole position
| Driver | (France) Jean-Pierre Jarier | Shadow-Ford |
- Time: 0:59.25

Fastest lap
| Driver | (France) Jean-Pierre Jarier | Shadow-Ford |
- Time: 1:00.44

Podium
| First | (Switzerland) Clay Regazzoni | Ferrari |
| Second | (France) Patrick Depailler | Tyrrell-Ford |
| Third | (Germany) Jochen Mass | McLaren-Ford |

The 1975 Swiss Grand Prix was a non-championship Formula One race held on 24 August 1975 at the Dijon-Prenois racetrack near Dijon, France, as circuit racing in Switzerland had been banned after the 1955 Le Mans disaster.

The 1975 French Grand Prix had been held in July at Circuit Paul Ricard, and the Swiss GP took place a week after the 1975 Austrian Grand Prix, two weeks before the 1975 Italian Grand Prix. Only the 1982 Swiss Grand Prix was part of the championship.

== Report ==
The week before in Austria, 30 cars had been entered, and 29 raced. The championship leaders Niki Lauda and Carlos Reutemann were not among the 16 entrants of this race.

Jean-Pierre Jarier took pole from reigning champion Emerson Fittipaldi, with home favourite Clay Regazzoni third and Jochen Mass in the other McLaren in fourth. Patrick Depailler qualified fifth and rounded out the five drivers in four makes to lap the short circuit in under a minute.

Fittipaldi's clutch slipped on the line and after 2 laps he retired completely. Jarier led from home favourite Clay Regazzoni, Depailler, Mass and John Watson. James Hunt was maintaining 6th place, despite suffering dreadful handling problems. Losing power on the corners, he soon lost position to Carlos Pace and Ronnie Peterson.

Jarier's lead had built up and he looked certain to obtain his first Formula One victory. Gearbox drive problems thwarted him though and a bitterly disappointed Jarier retired on lap 34.

Peterson also passed Watson to take 5th before the close, leaving the order at the end as Regazzoni, Depailler, Mass, Peterson, Watson, Pace. It was the only time in the short history of the Swiss Grand Prix that a Swiss driver won the race.

== Qualifying ==
| Pos | No | Driver | Constructor | Time |
|---|---|---|---|---|
| 1 | 17 | (France) Jean-Pierre Jarier | Shadow-Ford | 59.25 |
| 2 | 1 | (Brazil) Emerson Fittipaldi | McLaren-Ford | 59.27 |
| 3 | 12 | (Switzerland) Clay Regazzoni | Ferrari | 59.76 |
| 4 | 2 | (Germany) Jochen Mass | McLaren-Ford | 59.92 |
| 5 | 4 | (France) Patrick Depailler | Tyrrell-Ford | 59.99 |
| 6 | 18 | (United Kingdom) John Watson | Surtees-Ford | 1'00.04 |
| 7 | 8 | (Brazil) Carlos Pace | Brabham-Ford | 1'00.13 |
| 8 | 16 | (United Kingdom) Tom Pryce | Shadow-Ford | 1'00.28 |
| 9 | 31 | (New Zealand) Chris Amon | Ensign-Ford | 1'00.32 |
| 10 | 5 | (Sweden) Ronnie Peterson | Lotus-Ford | 1'00.41 |
| 11 | 24 | (United Kingdom) James Hunt | Hesketh-Ford | 1'00.47 |
| 12 | 9 | (Italy) Vittorio Brambilla | March-Ford | 1'00.63 |
| 13 | 21 | (France) Jacques Laffite | Williams-Ford | 1'01.07 |
| 14 | 22 | (Germany) Rolf Stommelen | Hill-Ford | 1'02.00 |
| 15 | 20 | (Switzerland) Jo Vonlanthen | Williams-Ford | 1'02.81 |
| 16 | 35 | (United Kingdom) Tony Trimmer | Maki-Ford | 1'04.29 |

== Race Result ==
| Pos | No | Driver | Constructor | Laps | Time/Retired | Grid |
|---|---|---|---|---|---|---|
| 1 | 12 | (Switzerland) Clay Regazzoni | Ferrari | 60 | 1:01:25.34 | 3 |
| 2 | 4 | (France) Patrick Depailler | Tyrrell-Ford | 60 | + 0:08.35 | 5 |
| 3 | 2 | (Germany) Jochen Mass | McLaren-Ford | 60 | + 0:15.44 | 4 |
| 4 | 5 | (Sweden) Ronnie Peterson | Lotus-Ford | 60 | + 0:40.14 | 10 |
| 5 | 18 | (United Kingdom) John Watson | Surtees-Ford | 60 | + 0:45.55 | 6 |
| 6 | 8 | (Brazil) Carlos Pace | Brabham-Ford | 60 | + 0:45.90 | 7 |
| 7 | 16 | (United Kingdom) Tom Pryce | Shadow-Ford | 60 | + 0:46.66 | 8 |
| 8 | 24 | (United Kingdom) James Hunt | Hesketh-Ford | 59 | + 1 Lap | 11 |
| 9 | 31 | (New Zealand) Chris Amon | Ensign-Ford | 59 | + 1 Lap | 9 |
| 10 | 21 | (France) Jacques Laffite | Williams-Ford | 59 | + 1 Lap | 13 |
| 11 | 9 | (Italy) Vittorio Brambilla | March-Ford | 58 | + 2 Laps | 12 |
| 12 | 22 | (Germany) Rolf Stommelen | Hill-Ford | 58 | + 2 Laps | 14 |
| 13 | 35 | (United Kingdom) Tony Trimmer | Maki-Ford | 54 | + 6 Laps | 16 |
| NC | 20 | (Switzerland) Jo Vonlanthen | Williams-Ford | 51 | + 9 Laps | 15 |
| Ret | 17 | (France) Jean-Pierre Jarier | Shadow-Ford | 33 | Transmission | 1 |
| Ret | 1 | (Brazil) Emerson Fittipaldi | McLaren-Ford | 6 | Clutch | 2 |

| Previous race: 1975 BRDC International Trophy | Formula One non-championship races 1975 season | Next race: 1976 Race of Champions |
| Previous race: 1954 Swiss Grand Prix | Swiss Grand Prix | Next race: 1982 Swiss Grand Prix |
