= Hiroshi Fushida =

Japanese racing driver (born 1946)

- Born: 10 March 1946 (age 80); Kyoto, Japan

Formula One World Championship career
- Nationality: (Japan) Japanese
- Active years: 1975
- Team: Maki
- Entries: 2 (0 starts)
- Championships: 0
- Wins: 0
- Podiums: 0
- Career points: 0
- Pole positions: 0
- Fastest laps: 0
- First entry: 1975 Dutch Grand Prix
- Last entry: 1975 British Grand Prix

24 Hours of Le Mans career
- Years: 1973, 1975, 1981
- Teams: Sigma Automotive, Mazdaspeed
- Best finish: 40th (1973)

Hiroshi Fushida (鮒子田 寛; , born 10 March 1946) is a Japanese former racing driver. He is the first Japanese driver to enter a Formula One World Championship Grand Prix, and the first to compete in the 24 Hours of Le Mans endurance race.

== Career ==
Fushida's driving career began in Japan in 1965 as a factory driver for Honda. In 1966, Fushida joined Toyota, and was one of five drivers who took part in the Toyota 2000GT Speed Trial at the Yatabe High Speed Test Track. While racing in Japan, Fushida won the Fuji 1000km endurance race four times (in 1968, 1969, 1971, and 1979), and the Suzuka 1000km two times (in 1968 and 1971). He also won the 1972 Fuji Grand Championship Race title, and took part in the 1968 and 1969 Japan Grand Prix sports car races.

After leaving Toyota following the 1969 season, Fushida began racing in America, competing in the SCCA Continental Championship, Canadian-American Challenge Cup, and the Trans-Am Series. After sustaining injuries in a Trans-Am racing accident at Road America in 1971, Fushida later returned to Japan.

Fushida, along with fellow countryman Tetsu Ikuzawa, made history when they became the first Japanese drivers to compete at Le Mans in 1973, driving the Mazda rotary-powered Sigma MC73.

Fushida unsuccessfully entered two Formula One Grands Prix with Maki, the first in The Netherlands at Zandvoort in 1975, where a blown engine prevented him from starting the race. The second was the British Grand Prix at Silverstone Circuit the same year, where he failed to qualify. Afterwards, Fushida was replaced at Maki by Tony Trimmer, and never again entered a Formula One race.

Fushida placed first in Class C and fifth overall, partnering Don Holland, in the 1975 Hardie Ferodo 1000 at Mount Panorama Circuit. That year, he made his second of three Le Mans entries, with his last occurring in 1981 for Mazdaspeed. Fushida's three entries at Le Mans as a driver each ended in retirements.

After retiring from racing in 1981, Fushida worked for Dome Racing in 1986, then joined the TOM'S tuning company in Japan in 1989, before moving to the UK in 1992 to oversee the company's entry in British Formula Three as TOM's GB. In 1998, TOM's GB was acquired by Audi, and became Racing Technology Norfolk (RTN). As operations director of RTN, Fushida oversaw the Bentley Speed 8's winning effort in the 2003 24 Hours of Le Mans. After the Le Mans triumph, Fushida returned to Japan again, primarily for Dome, where Fushida succeeded founder Minoru Hayashi as company president from September 2012 until his retirement in July 2015. He currently works as a consultant for Dome.

== Complete Formula One results ==
(key)

Year	Entrant	Chassis	Engine	1	2	3	4	5	6	7	8	9	10	11	12	13	14	WDC	Points
1975	Maki Engineering	Maki F101C	Cosworth V8	ARG	BRA	RSA	ESP	MON	BEL	SWE	NED; DNS	FRA	GBR; DNQ	GER	AUT	ITA	USA	NC	0

== 24 Hours of Le Mans results ==
Year	Team	Co-Drivers	Car	Class	Laps	Pos.	Class Pos.
1973	(Japan) Sigma Automotive	(Japan) Tetsu Ikuzawa (France) Patrick Dal Bo	Sigma MC73-Mazda	S 2.5	79	DNF	DNF
1975	(Japan) Sigma Automotive	(Japan) Harukuni Takahashi	Sigma MC75-Toyota	S 3.0	37	DNF	DNF
1981	(Japan) Mazdaspeed	(Japan) Yojiro Terada (United Kingdom) Win Percy	Mazda RX-7	IMSA; GTO	25	DNF	DNF
