= Jo Vonlanthen =

Swiss racing driver (born 1942)

- Born: 31 May 1942 (age 84); St. Ursen, Switzerland

Formula One World Championship career
- Nationality: (Switzerland) Swiss
- Active years: 1975
- Team: Williams
- Entries: 1
- Championships: 0
- Wins: 0
- Podiums: 0
- Career points: 0
- Pole positions: 0
- Fastest laps: 0
- First entry: 1975 Austrian Grand Prix

Joseph Vonlanthen (born 31 May 1942) is a former racing driver from Switzerland. He participated in one Formula One World Championship Grand Prix, on 17 August 1975, driving a Williams. He retired with engine failure, scoring no championship points.

Vonlanthen started in Formula Vee, before progressing to Formula Three, where he won the Swiss Formula 3 Championship. He found things a little tougher in Formula Two, but managed to secure a seat with Frank Williams for the non-championship Swiss Grand Prix in 1975, where he finished 14th. He also made a World Championship start in the 1975 Austrian Grand Prix. Vonlanthen can be considered lucky to have started this race, as he was only allowed to start when Wilson Fittipaldi suffered an injury in practice which prevented him from taking his place on the grid.

Vonlanthen subsequently returned to Formula 2 before disappearing from the sport's higher levels.

== Racing record ==
=== Complete European Formula Two Championship results ===
(key) (Races in bold indicate pole position; races in italics indicate fastest lap)

Year	Entrant	Chassis	Engine	1	2	3	4	5	6	7	8	9	10	11	12	13	14	15	16	17	Pos.	Pts
1973	Vonlanthen Racing Team	GRD 273	Ford BDA	MAL; Ret	HOC; DNQ	THR	NÜR; 18	PAU	KIN	NIV	HOC; Ret	ROU	MNZ; Ret	MAN; Ret	KAR; NC	PER; Ret	SAL; 8	NOR; Ret	ALB	VAL; 3	20th	4
1974	Team Vonlanthen	March 742	BMW M12	BAR; DNS	HOC; Ret	PAU	SAL; NC	HOC; Ret	MUG; 17	KAR; 10	PER; 9	HOC; 7	VAL; 11								NC	0
1975	Brissago Blauband Racing	March 742	BMW M12	EST; 2																	16th	6
1975	Brissago Blauband Racing	March 752	BMW M12		THR; 9	HOC; DNQ			HOC; 8	SAL; 9	ROU; Ret	MUG; DNS	PER	SIL	ZOL	NOG	VAL				16th	6
1975	Brissago Blauband Racing	March 722	BMW M12				NÜR; DNS	PAU													16th	6
1976	Jo Vonlanthen Racing	March 752	BMW M12	HOC; Ret	THR	VAL	SAL	PAU	HOC; Ret	ROU	MUG; DNQ	PER	EST	NOG	HOC; 13						NC	0

=== Complete Formula One World Championship results ===
(key) (Races in bold indicate pole position, races in italics indicate fastest lap)

Year	Entrant	Chassis	Engine	1	2	3	4	5	6	7	8	9	10	11	12	13	14	WDC	Pts.
1975	Frank Williams Racing Cars	Williams FW03	Ford Cosworth DFV 3.0 V8	ARG	BRA	RSA	ESP	MON	BEL	SWE	NED	FRA	GBR	GER	AUT; Ret	ITA	USA	NC	0
