= Maki Engineering =

Formula One constructor from Japan

Maki
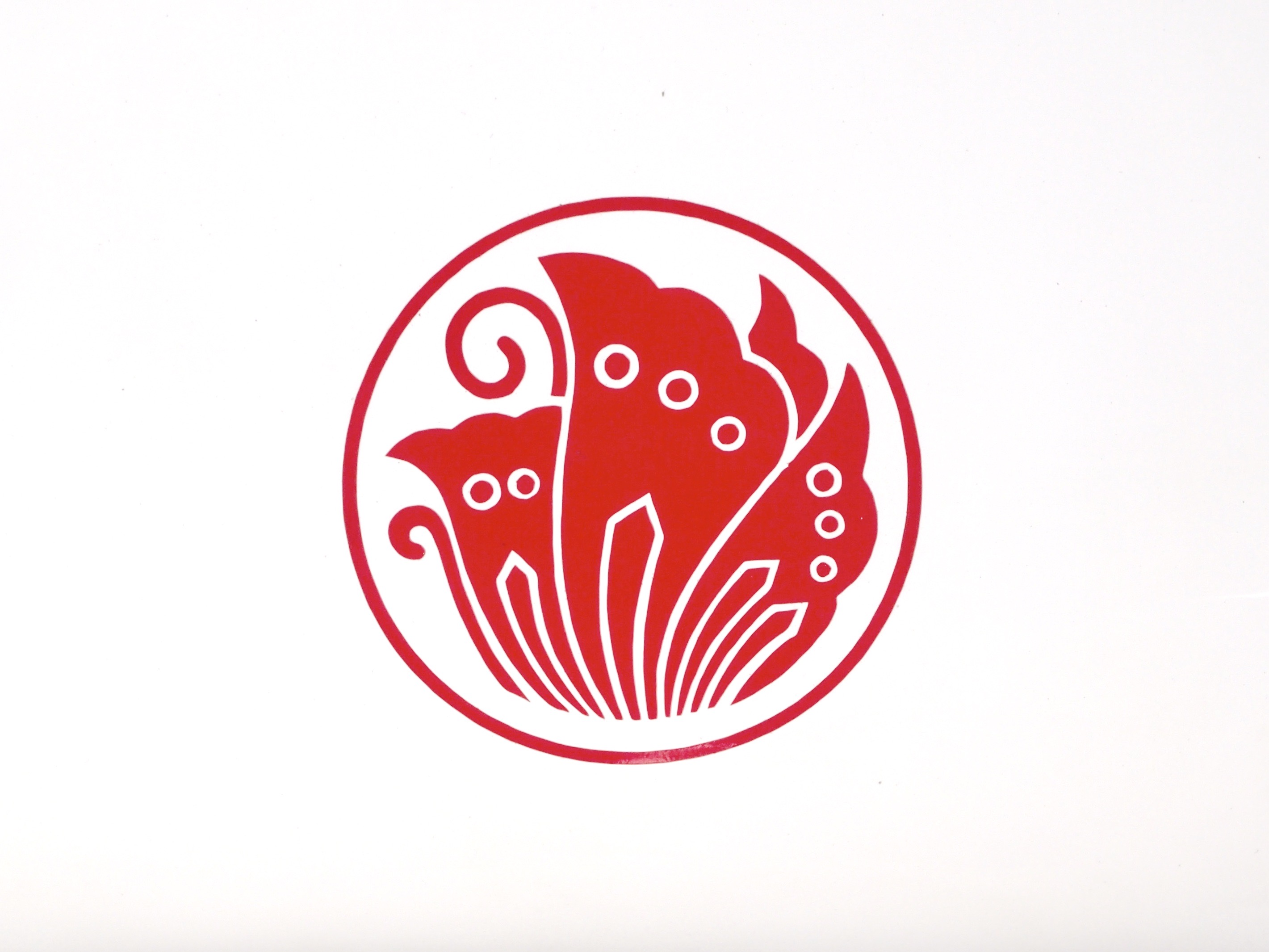
- Full name: Maki Engineering
- Base: Tokyo, Japan
- Founder(s): Kenji Mimura
- Noted drivers: (New Zealand) Howden Ganley (Japan) Hiroshi Fushida (United Kingdom) Tony Trimmer (Australia) David Walker

Formula One World Championship career
- First entry: 1974 British Grand Prix
- Races entered: 8 (0 starts)
- Engines: Cosworth DFV
- Race victories: 0
- Pole positions: 0
- Fastest laps: 0
- Final entry: 1976 Japanese Grand Prix

Maki Engineering was a Formula One constructor from Japan.

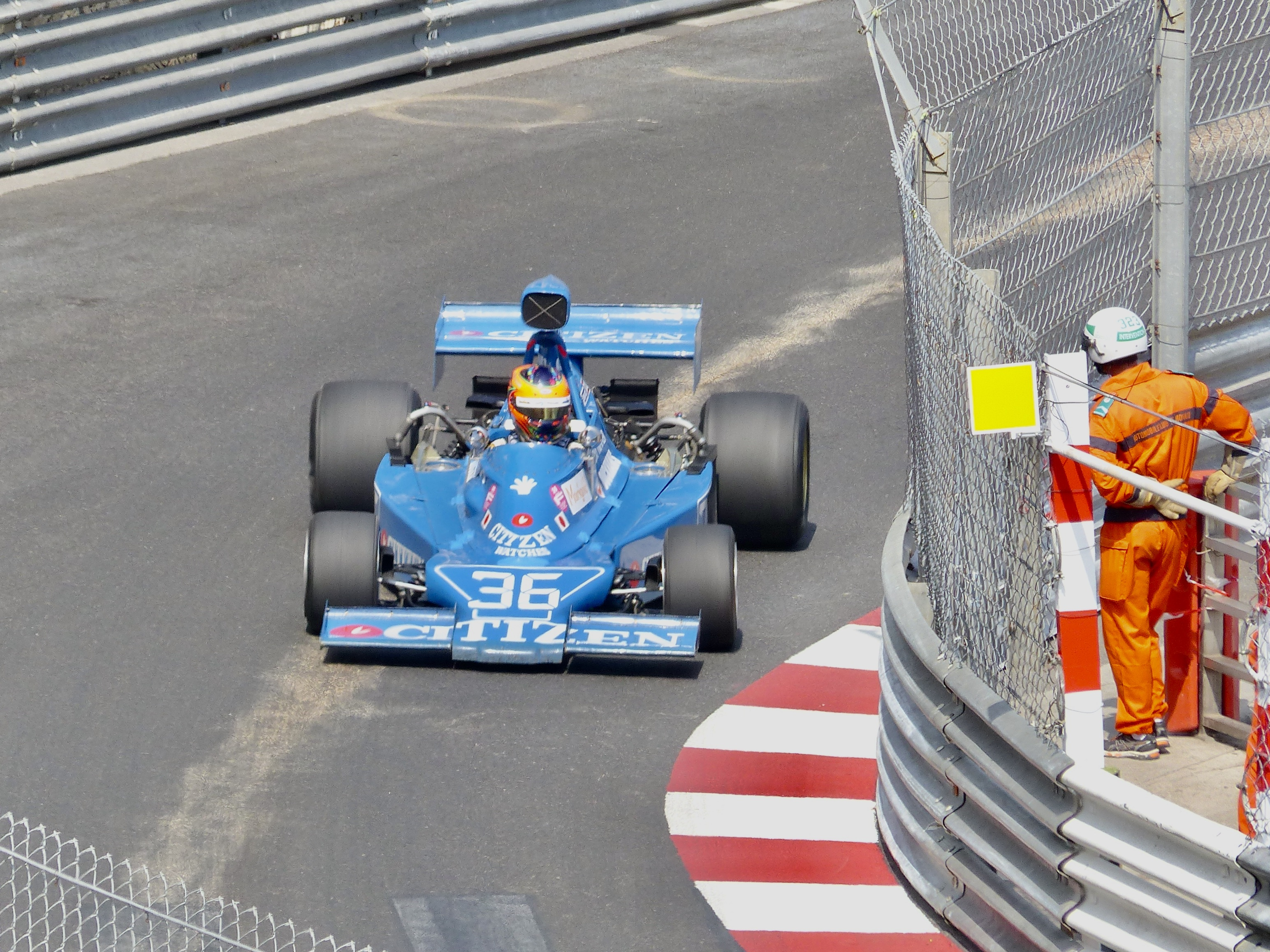
Maki F101C, Monaco Historique, 2018

== History ==
A small team founded by Kenji Mimura, their entry into the 1974 Formula One World Championship was Japan's first since Honda had withdrawn at the end of the 1968 season. They first entered the 1974 British Grand Prix, with New Zealand driver Howden Ganley driving a single Maki F101, powered by the ubiquitous Cosworth DFV V8 engine. He failed to qualify, and then badly injured his legs at the following German Grand Prix. The team then withdrew to Japan to repair and modify the car.

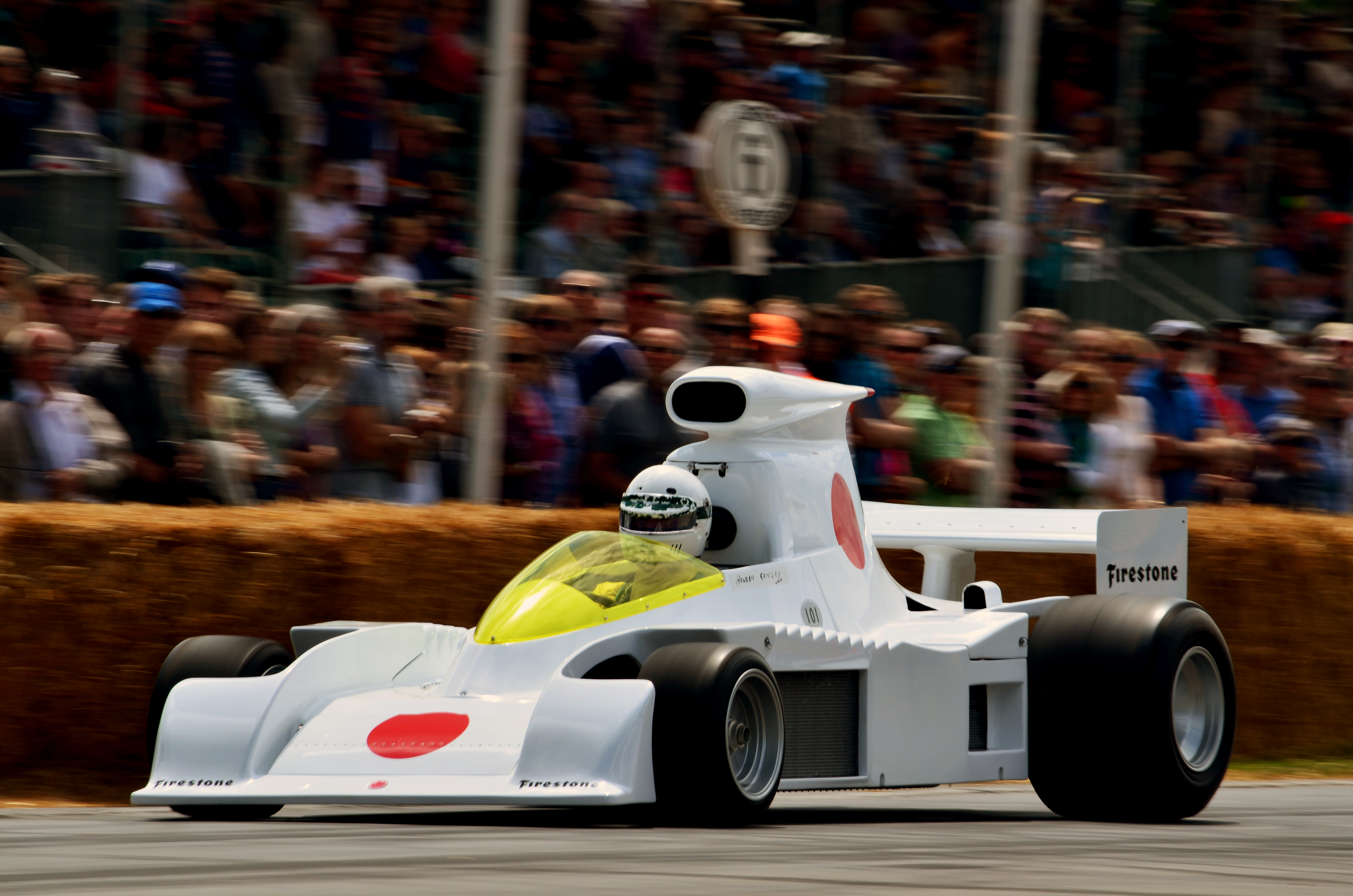
Maki F101

That seemed to be it, but then the small team re-emerged at the 1975 Dutch Grand Prix, with successful domestic driver Hiroshi Fushida driving the updated Maki F101C, and sponsorship from Citizen Watches. With only 25 entrants, he was guaranteed a starting place, but the DFV broke in practice and he was unable to start as the team had no spares. They missed the French Grand Prix, and then Fushida failed to qualify for the British Grand Prix. For the German Grand Prix, former Lotus F1 driver Tony Trimmer replaced Fushida, but was unable to qualify either there, or for the Austrian Grand Prix. Maki made its first and only race start in the non-championship Swiss Grand Prix, where Trimmer finished last of the finishers in 13th place, six laps behind Clay Regazzoni's Ferrari.

The team disappeared once again, only returning to Formula One once – for the 1976 season-closing Japanese Grand Prix. With Trimmer in the seat, the upgraded F102A once again failed to make the grid, and the team were never seen in Formula One again.

== Complete Formula One results ==
=== Formula One World Championship ===
(key)

Year	Chassis	Engine(s)	Tyres	Drivers	1	2	3	4	5	6	7	8	9	10	11	12	13	14	15	16	Points	WCC
1974	Maki F101	Ford V8	F		ARG	BRA	RSA	ESP	BEL	MON	SWE	NED	FRA	GBR	GER	AUT	ITA	CAN	USA		0	–
1974	Maki F101	Ford V8	F	(New Zealand) Howden Ganley										DNQ	DNQ						0	–
1975	Maki F101C	Ford V8	F G		ARG	BRA	RSA	ESP	MON	BEL	SWE	NED	FRA	GBR	GER	AUT	ITA	USA			0	–
1975	Maki F101C	Ford V8	F G	(Australia) David Walker						WD	WD										0	–
1975	Maki F101C	Ford V8	F G	(Japan) Hiroshi Fushida								DNS		DNQ							0	–
1975	Maki F101C	Ford V8	F G	(United Kingdom) Tony Trimmer											DNQ	DNQ	DNQ				0	–
1976	Maki F102A	Ford V8	D		BRA	RSA	USW	ESP	BEL	MON	SWE	FRA	GBR	GER	AUT	NED	ITA	CAN	USA	JPN	0	–
1976	Maki F102A	Ford V8	D	(United Kingdom) Tony Trimmer																DNQ	0	–

=== Non-championship results ===
Year	Event	Venue	Driver	Result	Category	Report
1975	Swiss Grand Prix	Dijon	Tony Trimmer	13th	Formula One	Report
