= Roelof Wunderink =

Dutch racing driver (born 1948)

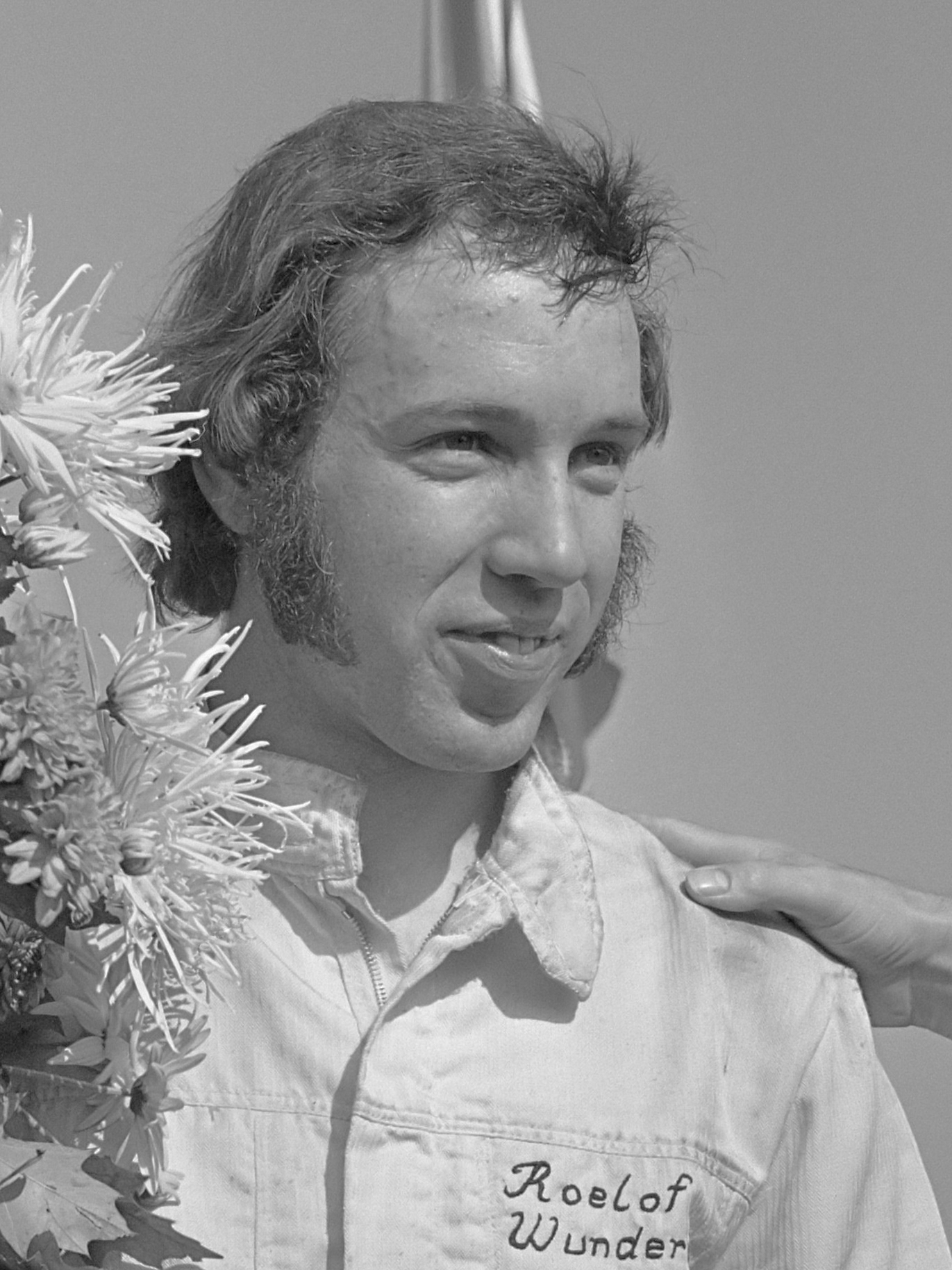
- Roelof Wunderink (1972)
- Born: 12 December 1948 (age 77); Eindhoven, Netherlands

Formula One World Championship career
- Nationality: (Netherlands) Dutch
- Active years: 1975
- Team: Ensign
- Entries: 6 (3 starts)
- Championships: 0
- Wins: 0
- Podiums: 0
- Career points: 0
- Pole positions: 0
- Fastest laps: 0
- First entry: 1975 Spanish Grand Prix
- Last entry: 1975 United States Grand Prix

Roelof Wunderink (born 12 December 1948) is a Dutch former racing driver. He participated in six Formula One World Championship Grands Prix for Ensign, debuting on 27 April 1975. He scored no championship points.

== Racing career ==
Wunderink began his career with a Simca in 1970 subsequently moving into Formula Ford and winning the Dutch championship in 1972. With sponsorship from the HB alarm company, he moved into Formula Three and then Formula 5000 in the following two seasons. In 1975, with HB backing, he moved into Formula One with the Ensign team, but was hampered by using obsolete machinery and injuries sustained in a Formula 5000 testing incident. In six attempts, he qualified on three occasions retiring from two races with mechanical problems. In his only finish, in Austria, he was not classified, four laps behind having pit-stopped for tyres. At the end of the season, Wunderink withdrew from top-level motorsport. He was subsequently known to be involved in the property business.

== Racing record ==
=== Complete European F5000 Championship results ===
(key) (Races in bold indicate pole position; races in italics indicate fastest lap.)

Year	Entrant	Chassis	Engine	1	2	3	4	5	6	7	8	9	10	11	12	13	14	15	16	17	18	Pos.	Pts
1974	HB Bewaking Alarm Systems	Chevron B24	Chevrolet 5.0 V8	BRH	MAL	SIL; NC	OUL	BRH	ZOL; NC	THR	ZAN; 6	MUG; 5	MNZ; Ret	MAL; Ret	MON; NC	THR; Ret	BRH	OUL	SNE; DNS	MAL; Ret	BRH; Ret	21st	14
1975	A.G. Dean	Chevron B24	Chevrolet 5.0 V8	BRH	OUL	BRH	SIL	ZOL	ZAN; DNS	THR	SNE	MAL	THR	BRH	OUL	SIL	SNE	MAL	BRH			NC	0

=== Complete Formula One World Championship results ===
(key)

Year	Entrant	Chassis	Engine	1	2	3	4	5	6	7	8	9	10	11	12	13	14	WDC	Pts
1975	HB Bewaking Team Ensign	Ensign N174	Ford Cosworth DFV 3.0 V8	ARG	BRA	RSA	ESP; Ret	MON; DNQ	BEL	SWE	NED	FRA			AUT; NC	ITA; DNQ		NC	0
1975	HB Bewaking Team Ensign	Ensign N175	Ford Cosworth DFV 3.0 V8										GBR; DNQ	GER			USA; Ret	NC	0
