= 1975 Formula One season =

29th season of FIA Formula One motor racing

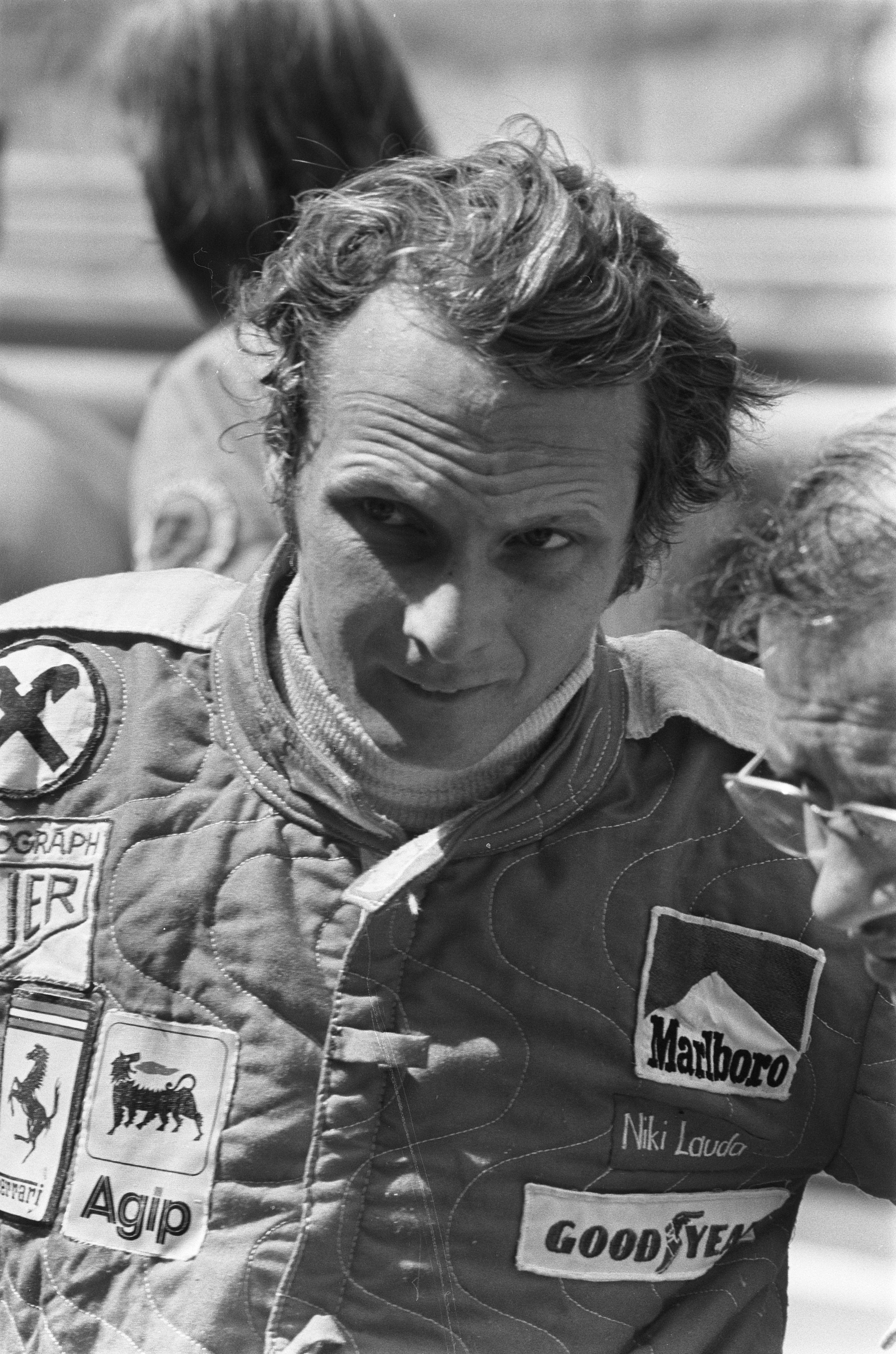
Niki Lauda, driving for Ferrari, won the first of his three world championships.

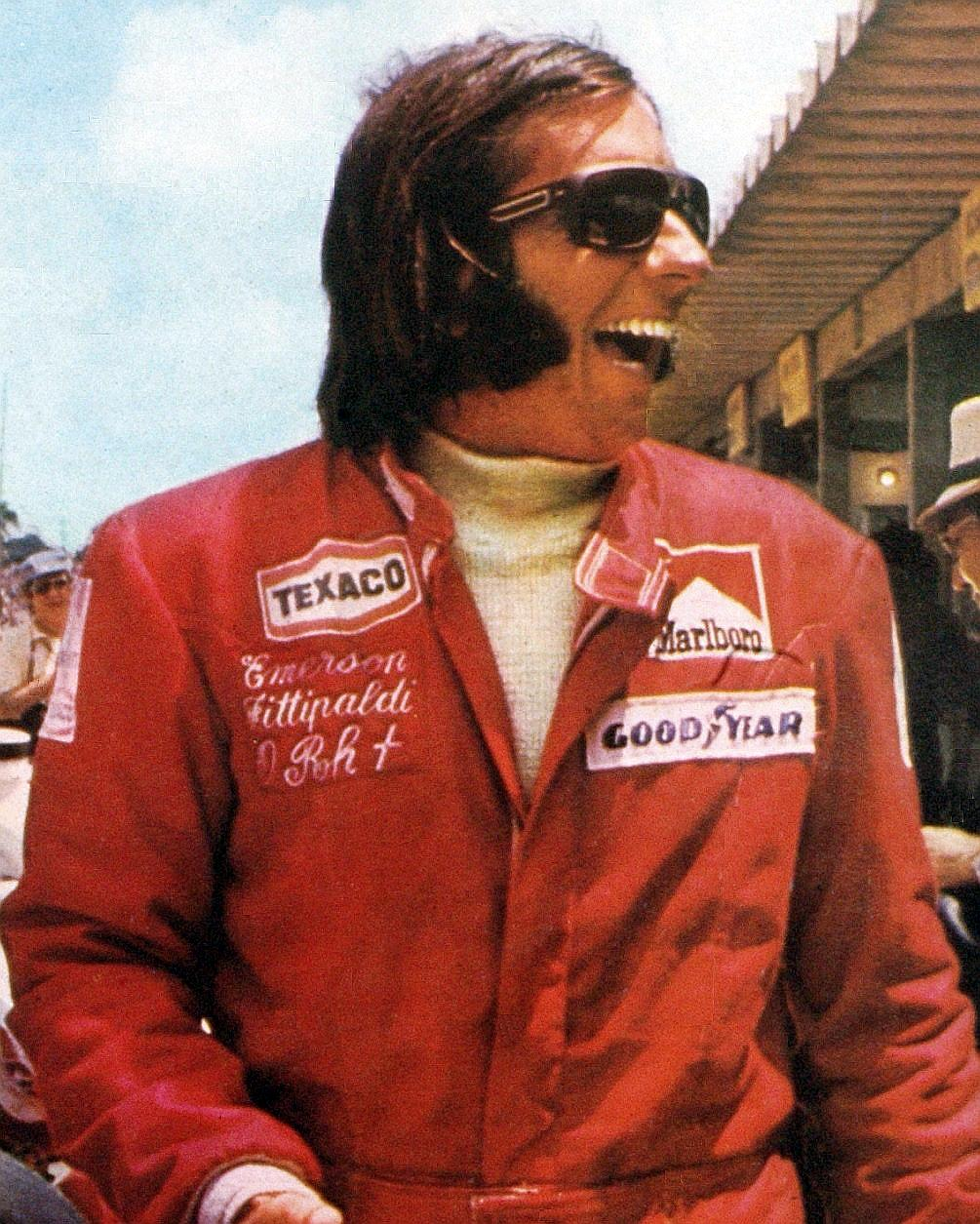
Two-time and defending champion Emerson Fittipaldi (pictured in 1974) placed second overall.

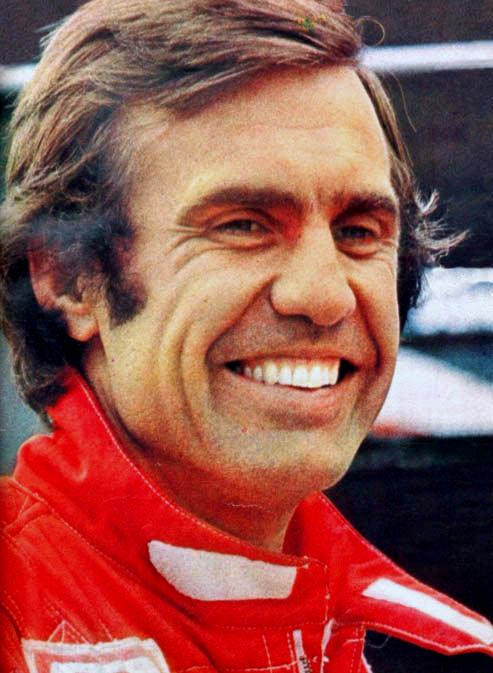
Carlos Reutemann (pictured in 1981) finished third in the standings.

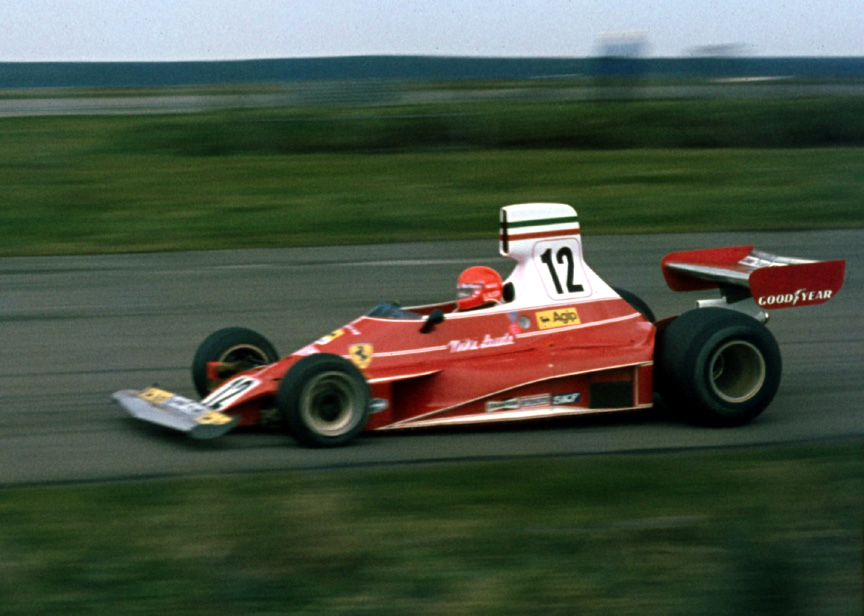
Ferrari won the International Cup for F1 Manufacturers' title, their first since 11 years prior.

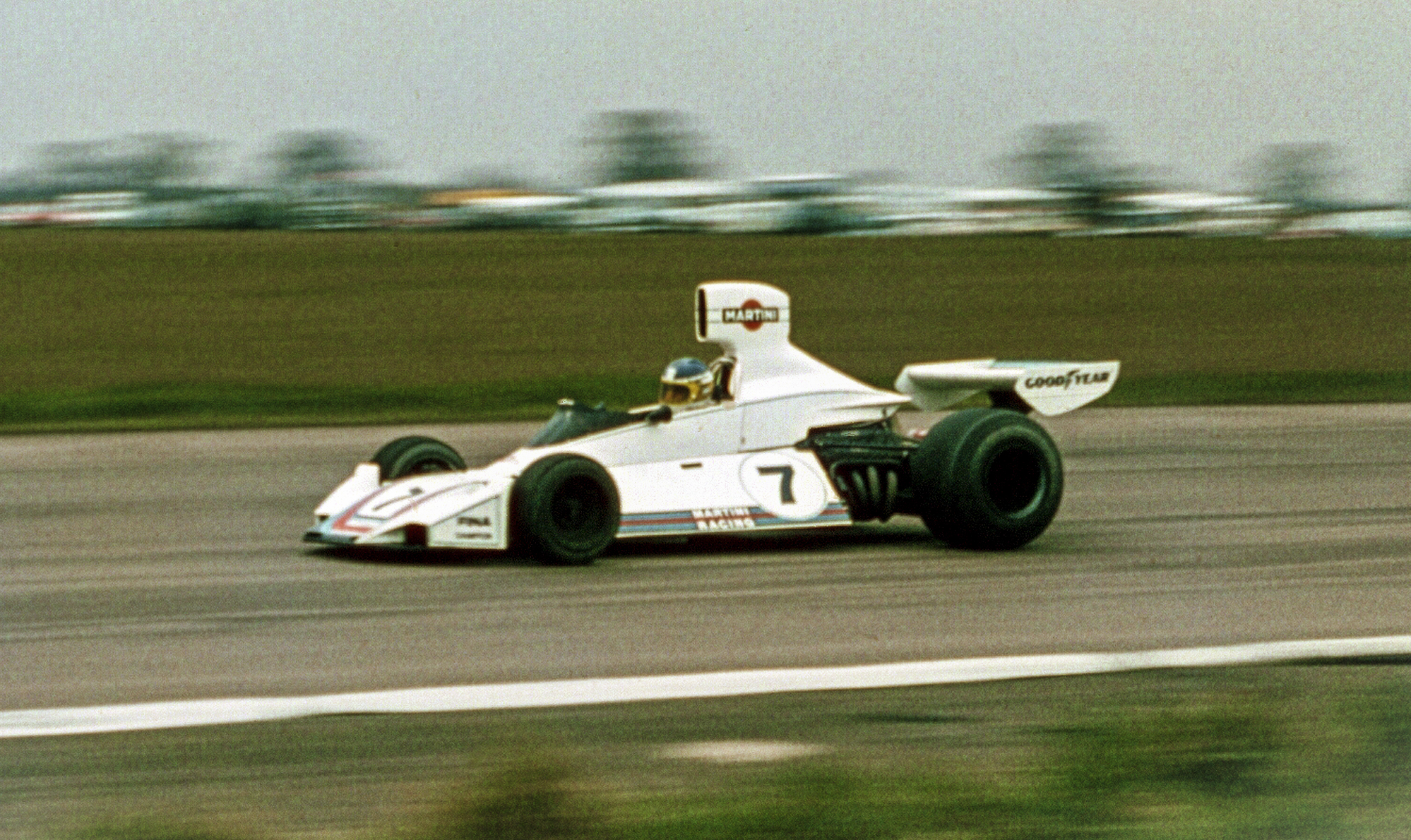
Brabham finished second in the Manufacturers' Championship.

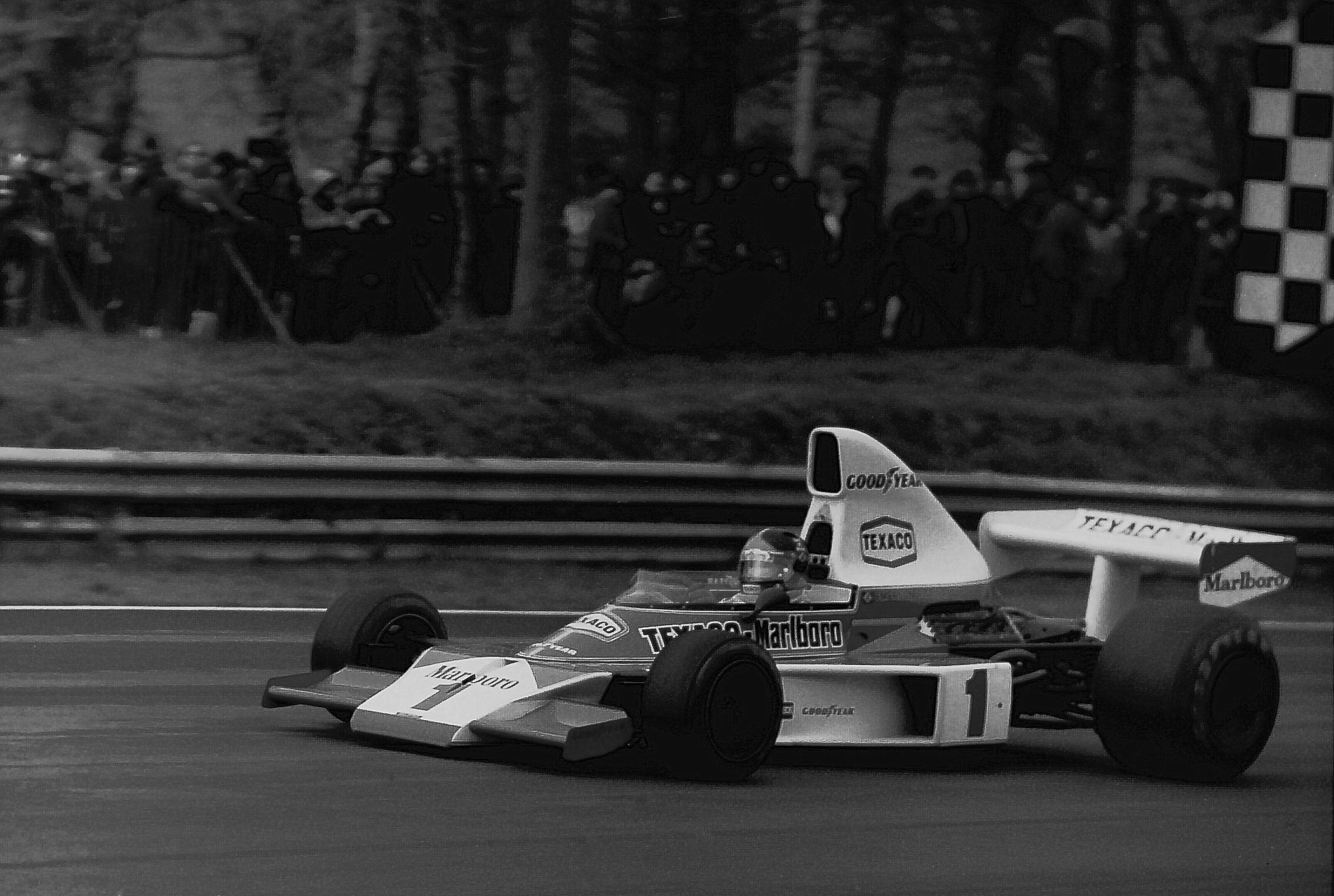
McLaren finished third in the Manufacturers' Championship.

The 1975 Formula One season was the 29th season of FIA Formula One motor racing. It featured the 1975 World Championship of F1 Drivers and the 1975 International Cup for F1 Manufacturers which were contested concurrently from 12 January to 5 October over fourteen races. The season also included three non-championship Formula One races and a nine race South African Formula One Championship.

After a strong finish to the 1974 season, many observers felt the Brabham team were favourites going into the new year. An emotional first win for Carlos Pace in his native São Paulo looked to confirm this, but tyre wear frequently hampered the cars and the initial promise was not maintained. In his second year with Ferrari, Niki Lauda was given the keys to the Ferrari 312T, a car that was technically far superior to any of the competition. He won his first drivers' title with five wins and a huge margin over second place in the championship. Ferrari took home the championship trophy for manufacturers. Lauda often referred to 1975 as "the unbelievable year".

American Mark Donohue died in August, two days after crashing in practice for the Austrian Grand Prix. The 1975 season would be the last Formula One season to see a fatality caused by an accident in the rain until the 2014 season when Jules Bianchi died as a result of his injuries following an accident at the 2014 Japanese Grand Prix. After the season, in late November, an Embassy Hill airplane crashed in England and all six aboard were killed, including team owner Graham Hill and driver Tony Brise.

== Drivers and constructors ==
The following drivers and constructors and contested the 1975 World Championship of F1 Drivers and the 1975 International Cup for F1 Manufacturers.

Entrant	Constructor	Chassis	Engine	Tyre	No	Driver	Rounds
(United Kingdom) Marlboro Team Texaco	McLaren-Ford	M23C	Ford Cosworth DFV 3.0 V8	G	1	(Brazil) Emerson Fittipaldi	All
(United Kingdom) Marlboro Team Texaco	McLaren-Ford	M23C	Ford Cosworth DFV 3.0 V8	G	2	(West Germany) Jochen Mass	All
(United Kingdom) Elf Team Tyrrell	Tyrrell-Ford	007	Ford Cosworth DFV 3.0 V8	G	3	(South Africa) Jody Scheckter	All
(United Kingdom) Elf Team Tyrrell	Tyrrell-Ford	007	Ford Cosworth DFV 3.0 V8	G	4	(France) Patrick Depailler	All
(United Kingdom) Elf Team Tyrrell	Tyrrell-Ford	007	Ford Cosworth DFV 3.0 V8	G	15	(France) Jean-Pierre Jabouille	9
(United Kingdom) Elf Team Tyrrell	Tyrrell-Ford	007	Ford Cosworth DFV 3.0 V8	G	15	(France) Michel Leclère	14
(United Kingdom) John Player Team Lotus	Lotus-Ford	72E	Ford Cosworth DFV 3.0 V8	G	5	(Sweden) Ronnie Peterson	All
(United Kingdom) John Player Team Lotus	Lotus-Ford	72E	Ford Cosworth DFV 3.0 V8	G	6	(Belgium) Jacky Ickx	1–9
(United Kingdom) John Player Team Lotus	Lotus-Ford	72E	Ford Cosworth DFV 3.0 V8	G	6	(United Kingdom) Jim Crawford	10, 13
(United Kingdom) John Player Team Lotus	Lotus-Ford	72E	Ford Cosworth DFV 3.0 V8	G	6	(United Kingdom) John Watson	11
(United Kingdom) John Player Team Lotus	Lotus-Ford	72E	Ford Cosworth DFV 3.0 V8	G	6	(United Kingdom) Brian Henton	12, 14
(United Kingdom) John Player Team Lotus	Lotus-Ford	72E	Ford Cosworth DFV 3.0 V8	G	15	(United Kingdom) Brian Henton	10
(United Kingdom) Martini Racing	Brabham-Ford	BT44B	Ford Cosworth DFV 3.0 V8	G	7	(Argentina) Carlos Reutemann	All
(United Kingdom) Martini Racing	Brabham-Ford	BT44B	Ford Cosworth DFV 3.0 V8	G	8	(Brazil) Carlos Pace	All
(United Kingdom) Beta Team March (United Kingdom) Lavazza March	March-Ford	741; 751	Ford Cosworth DFV 3.0 V8	G	9	(Italy) Vittorio Brambilla	All
(United Kingdom) Beta Team March (United Kingdom) Lavazza March	March-Ford	741; 751	Ford Cosworth DFV 3.0 V8	G	10	(Italy) Lella Lombardi	3–9
(United Kingdom) Beta Team March (United Kingdom) Lavazza March	March-Ford	741; 751	Ford Cosworth DFV 3.0 V8	G	10	(West Germany) Hans-Joachim Stuck	10–14
(United Kingdom) Beta Team March (United Kingdom) Lavazza March	March-Ford	741; 751	Ford Cosworth DFV 3.0 V8	G	29	(Italy) Lella Lombardi	10–13
(Italy) SEFAC Ferrari	Ferrari	312B3-74; 312T	Ferrari 001/11 3.0 F12; Ferrari 015 3.0 F12	G	11	(Switzerland) Clay Regazzoni	All
(Italy) SEFAC Ferrari	Ferrari	312B3-74; 312T	Ferrari 001/11 3.0 F12; Ferrari 015 3.0 F12	G	12	(Austria) Niki Lauda	All
(United Kingdom) Stanley-BRM	BRM	P201	BRM P200 3.0 V12	G	14	(United Kingdom) Mike Wilds	1–2
(United Kingdom) Stanley-BRM	BRM	P201	BRM P200 3.0 V12	G	14	(United Kingdom) Bob Evans	3–9, 12–13
(United States) UOP Shadow Racing	Shadow-Ford	DN3B; DN5	Ford Cosworth DFV 3.0 V8	G	16	(United Kingdom) Tom Pryce	All
(United States) UOP Shadow Racing	Shadow-Ford	DN3B; DN5	Ford Cosworth DFV 3.0 V8	G	17	(France) Jean-Pierre Jarier	1–11, 14
(United States) UOP Shadow Racing	Shadow-Matra	DN7	Matra MS73 3.0 V12	G	17	(France) Jean-Pierre Jarier	12–13
(United Kingdom) Matchbox Team Surtees (United Kingdom) National Organs Team Surtees	Surtees-Ford	TS16	Ford Cosworth DFV 3.0 V8	G	18	(United Kingdom) John Watson	1–10, 12
(United Kingdom) Matchbox Team Surtees (United Kingdom) National Organs Team Surtees	Surtees-Ford	TS16	Ford Cosworth DFV 3.0 V8	G	19	(United Kingdom) Dave Morgan	10
(United Kingdom) HB Bewaking Team Ensign	Ensign-Ford	N174; N175	Ford Cosworth DFV 3.0 V8	G	19	(Netherlands) Gijs van Lennep	11
(United Kingdom) HB Bewaking Team Ensign	Ensign-Ford	N174; N175	Ford Cosworth DFV 3.0 V8	G	31	(Netherlands) Gijs van Lennep	8–9
(United Kingdom) HB Bewaking Team Ensign	Ensign-Ford	N174; N175	Ford Cosworth DFV 3.0 V8	G	31	(Netherlands) Roelof Wunderink	4–5, 10, 13–14
(United Kingdom) HB Bewaking Team Ensign	Ensign-Ford	N174; N175	Ford Cosworth DFV 3.0 V8	G	31	(New Zealand) Chris Amon	12
(United Kingdom) HB Bewaking Team Ensign	Ensign-Ford	N174; N175	Ford Cosworth DFV 3.0 V8	G	32	(New Zealand) Chris Amon	13
(United Kingdom) HB Bewaking Team Ensign	Ensign-Ford	N174; N175	Ford Cosworth DFV 3.0 V8	G	33	(Netherlands) Roelof Wunderink	12
(United Kingdom) Frank Williams Racing Cars (United Kingdom) Williams Ambrozium H7 Racing	Williams-Ford	FW; FW04	Ford Cosworth DFV 3.0 V8	G	20	(Italy) Arturo Merzario	1–6
(United Kingdom) Frank Williams Racing Cars (United Kingdom) Williams Ambrozium H7 Racing	Williams-Ford	FW; FW04	Ford Cosworth DFV 3.0 V8	G	20	(United Kingdom) Damien Magee	7
(United Kingdom) Frank Williams Racing Cars (United Kingdom) Williams Ambrozium H7 Racing	Williams-Ford	FW; FW04	Ford Cosworth DFV 3.0 V8	G	20	(South Africa) Ian Scheckter	8
(United Kingdom) Frank Williams Racing Cars (United Kingdom) Williams Ambrozium H7 Racing	Williams-Ford	FW; FW04	Ford Cosworth DFV 3.0 V8	G	20	(France) François Migault	9
(United Kingdom) Frank Williams Racing Cars (United Kingdom) Williams Ambrozium H7 Racing	Williams-Ford	FW; FW04	Ford Cosworth DFV 3.0 V8	G	20	(United Kingdom) Ian Ashley	11
(United Kingdom) Frank Williams Racing Cars (United Kingdom) Williams Ambrozium H7 Racing	Williams-Ford	FW; FW04	Ford Cosworth DFV 3.0 V8	G	20	(Switzerland) Jo Vonlanthen	12
(United Kingdom) Frank Williams Racing Cars (United Kingdom) Williams Ambrozium H7 Racing	Williams-Ford	FW; FW04	Ford Cosworth DFV 3.0 V8	G	20	(Italy) Renzo Zorzi	13
(United Kingdom) Frank Williams Racing Cars (United Kingdom) Williams Ambrozium H7 Racing	Williams-Ford	FW; FW04	Ford Cosworth DFV 3.0 V8	G	20	(Italy) Lella Lombardi	14
(United Kingdom) Frank Williams Racing Cars (United Kingdom) Williams Ambrozium H7 Racing	Williams-Ford	FW; FW04	Ford Cosworth DFV 3.0 V8	G	21	(South Africa) Ian Scheckter	7
(United Kingdom) Frank Williams Racing Cars (United Kingdom) Williams Ambrozium H7 Racing	Williams-Ford	FW; FW04	Ford Cosworth DFV 3.0 V8	G	21	(France) Jacques Laffite	1–3, 5–6, 8–14
(United Kingdom) Frank Williams Racing Cars (United Kingdom) Williams Ambrozium H7 Racing	Williams-Ford	FW; FW04	Ford Cosworth DFV 3.0 V8	G	21	(United Kingdom) Tony Brise	4
(United Kingdom) Embassy Racing with Graham Hill	Lola-Ford	T370; T371	Ford Cosworth DFV 3.0 V8	G	22	(United Kingdom) Graham Hill	1–3
(United Kingdom) Embassy Racing with Graham Hill	Lola-Ford	T370; T371	Ford Cosworth DFV 3.0 V8	G	23	(West Germany) Rolf Stommelen	1–3
(United Kingdom) Embassy Racing with Graham Hill	Hill-Ford	GH1	Ford Cosworth DFV 3.0 V8	G	22	(West Germany) Rolf Stommelen	4, 12–13
(United Kingdom) Embassy Racing with Graham Hill	Hill-Ford	GH1	Ford Cosworth DFV 3.0 V8	G	22	(France) François Migault	6
(United Kingdom) Embassy Racing with Graham Hill	Hill-Ford	GH1	Ford Cosworth DFV 3.0 V8	G	22	(Australia) Vern Schuppan	7
(United Kingdom) Embassy Racing with Graham Hill	Hill-Ford	GH1	Ford Cosworth DFV 3.0 V8	G	22	(Australia) Alan Jones	8–11
(United Kingdom) Embassy Racing with Graham Hill	Hill-Ford	GH1	Ford Cosworth DFV 3.0 V8	G	23	(France) François Migault	4
(United Kingdom) Embassy Racing with Graham Hill	Hill-Ford	GH1	Ford Cosworth DFV 3.0 V8	G	23	(United Kingdom) Graham Hill	5
(United Kingdom) Embassy Racing with Graham Hill	Hill-Ford	GH1	Ford Cosworth DFV 3.0 V8	G	23	(United Kingdom) Tony Brise	6–14
(United Kingdom) Hesketh Racing (United Kingdom) Warsteiner Brewery (United Kingdom) Polar Caravans	Hesketh-Ford	308; 308B; 308C	Ford Cosworth DFV 3.0 V8	G	24	(United Kingdom) James Hunt	All
(United Kingdom) Hesketh Racing (United Kingdom) Warsteiner Brewery (United Kingdom) Polar Caravans	Hesketh-Ford	308; 308B; 308C	Ford Cosworth DFV 3.0 V8	G	25	(Sweden) Torsten Palm	5
(United Kingdom) Hesketh Racing (United Kingdom) Warsteiner Brewery (United Kingdom) Polar Caravans	Hesketh-Ford	308; 308B; 308C	Ford Cosworth DFV 3.0 V8	G	25	(Austria) Harald Ertl	11
(United Kingdom) Hesketh Racing (United Kingdom) Warsteiner Brewery (United Kingdom) Polar Caravans	Hesketh-Ford	308; 308B; 308C	Ford Cosworth DFV 3.0 V8	G	25	(United States) Brett Lunger	12–14
(United Kingdom) Hesketh Racing (United Kingdom) Warsteiner Brewery (United Kingdom) Polar Caravans	Hesketh-Ford	308; 308B; 308C	Ford Cosworth DFV 3.0 V8	G	32	(Sweden) Torsten Palm	7
(United Kingdom) Hesketh Racing (United Kingdom) Warsteiner Brewery (United Kingdom) Polar Caravans	Hesketh-Ford	308; 308B; 308C	Ford Cosworth DFV 3.0 V8	G	32	(Austria) Harald Ertl	12
(United Kingdom) Hesketh Racing (United Kingdom) Warsteiner Brewery (United Kingdom) Polar Caravans	Hesketh-Ford	308; 308B; 308C	Ford Cosworth DFV 3.0 V8	G	34	(Austria) Harald Ertl	13
(United Kingdom) Custom Made Harry Stiller Racing (United Kingdom) Rob Walkers Custom Made Racing	Hesketh-Ford	308B	Ford Cosworth DFV 3.0 V8	G	25	(Australia) Alan Jones	4
(United Kingdom) Custom Made Harry Stiller Racing (United Kingdom) Rob Walkers Custom Made Racing	Hesketh-Ford	308B	Ford Cosworth DFV 3.0 V8	G	26	(Australia) Alan Jones	5–7
(United States) Vel's Parnelli Jones Racing	Parnelli-Ford	VPJ4	Ford Cosworth DFV 3.0 V8	F G	27	(United States) Mario Andretti	1–5, 7, 9–14
(United States) First National City Bank Team	March-Ford	751	Ford Cosworth DFV 3.0 V8	G	28	(United States) Mark Donohue	10–12
(United States) First National City Bank Team	Penske-Ford	PC1	Ford Cosworth DFV 3.0 V8	G	28	(United States) Mark Donohue	1–9
(United States) First National City Bank Team	Penske-Ford	PC1	Ford Cosworth DFV 3.0 V8	G	28	(United Kingdom) John Watson	14
(Brazil) Copersucar Fittipaldi	Fittipaldi-Ford	FD01; FD02; FD03	Ford Cosworth DFV 3.0 V8	G	30	(Brazil) Wilson Fittipaldi	1–12, 14
(Brazil) Copersucar Fittipaldi	Fittipaldi-Ford	FD01; FD02; FD03	Ford Cosworth DFV 3.0 V8	G	30	(Italy) Arturo Merzario	13
(South Africa) Lucky Strike Racing	McLaren-Ford	M23	Ford Cosworth DFV 3.0 V8	G	31	(South Africa) Dave Charlton	3
(South Africa) Lexington Racing	Tyrrell-Ford	007	Ford Cosworth DFV 3.0 V8	G	32	(South Africa) Ian Scheckter	3
(United Kingdom) Pinch Plant (Ltd)	Lyncar-Ford	006	Ford Cosworth DFV 3.0 V8	G	32	(New Zealand) John Nicholson	10
(South Africa) Team Gunston	Lotus-Ford	72E	Ford Cosworth DFV 3.0 V8	G	33	(South Africa) Eddie Keizan	3
(South Africa) Team Gunston	Lotus-Ford	72E	Ford Cosworth DFV 3.0 V8	G	34	(South Africa) Guy Tunmer	3
(Japan) Citizen Maki F1 (Japan) Citizen Maki Engineering (Japan) Citizen Maki F1-Team	Maki-Ford	F101C	Ford Cosworth DFV 3.0 V8	F G	35	(Japan) Hiroshi Fushida	8, 10
(Japan) Citizen Maki F1 (Japan) Citizen Maki Engineering (Japan) Citizen Maki F1-Team	Maki-Ford	F101C	Ford Cosworth DFV 3.0 V8	F G	35	(United Kingdom) Tony Trimmer	11–13

=== Team and driver changes ===
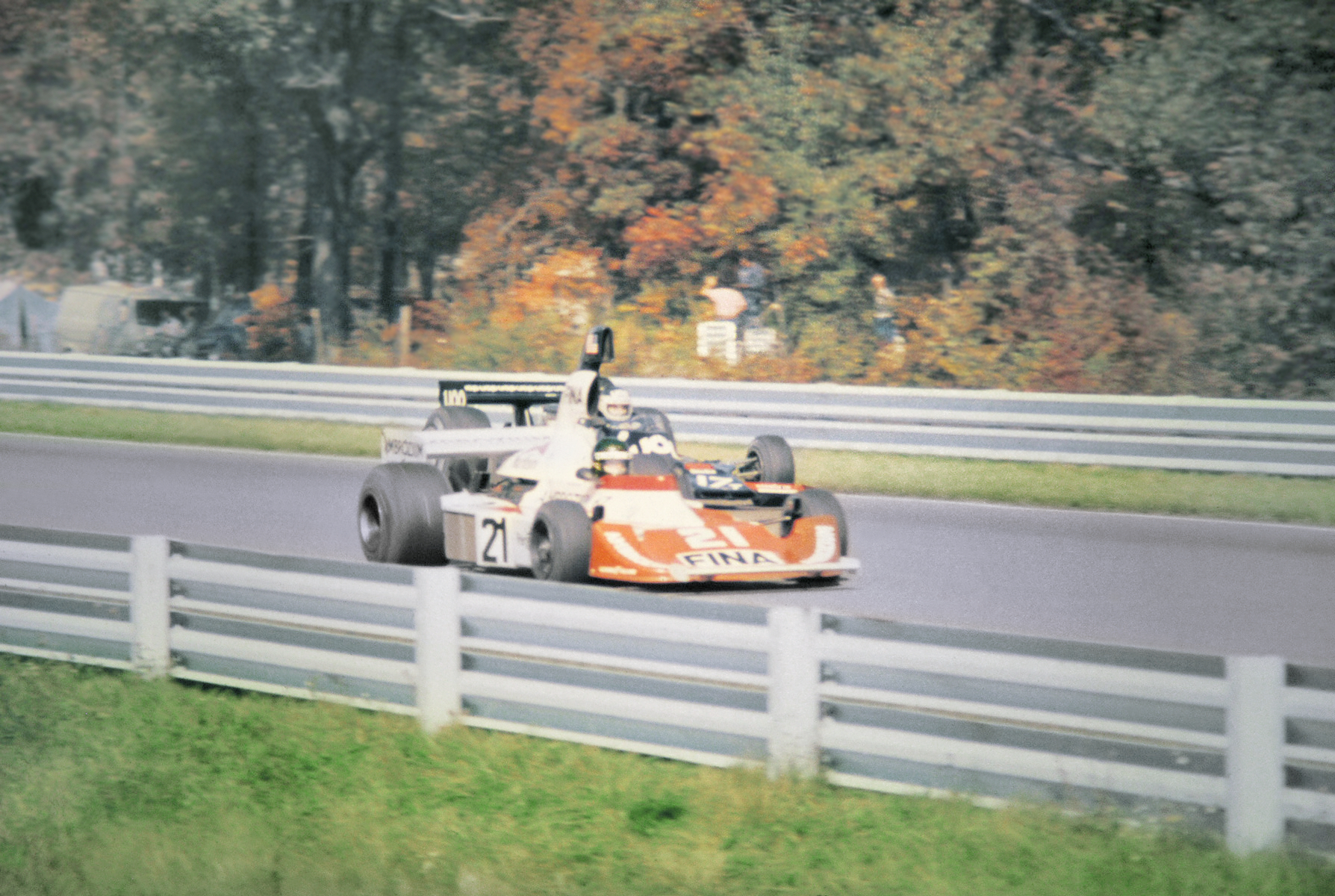
Jacques Laffite driving for Williams in Watkins Glen

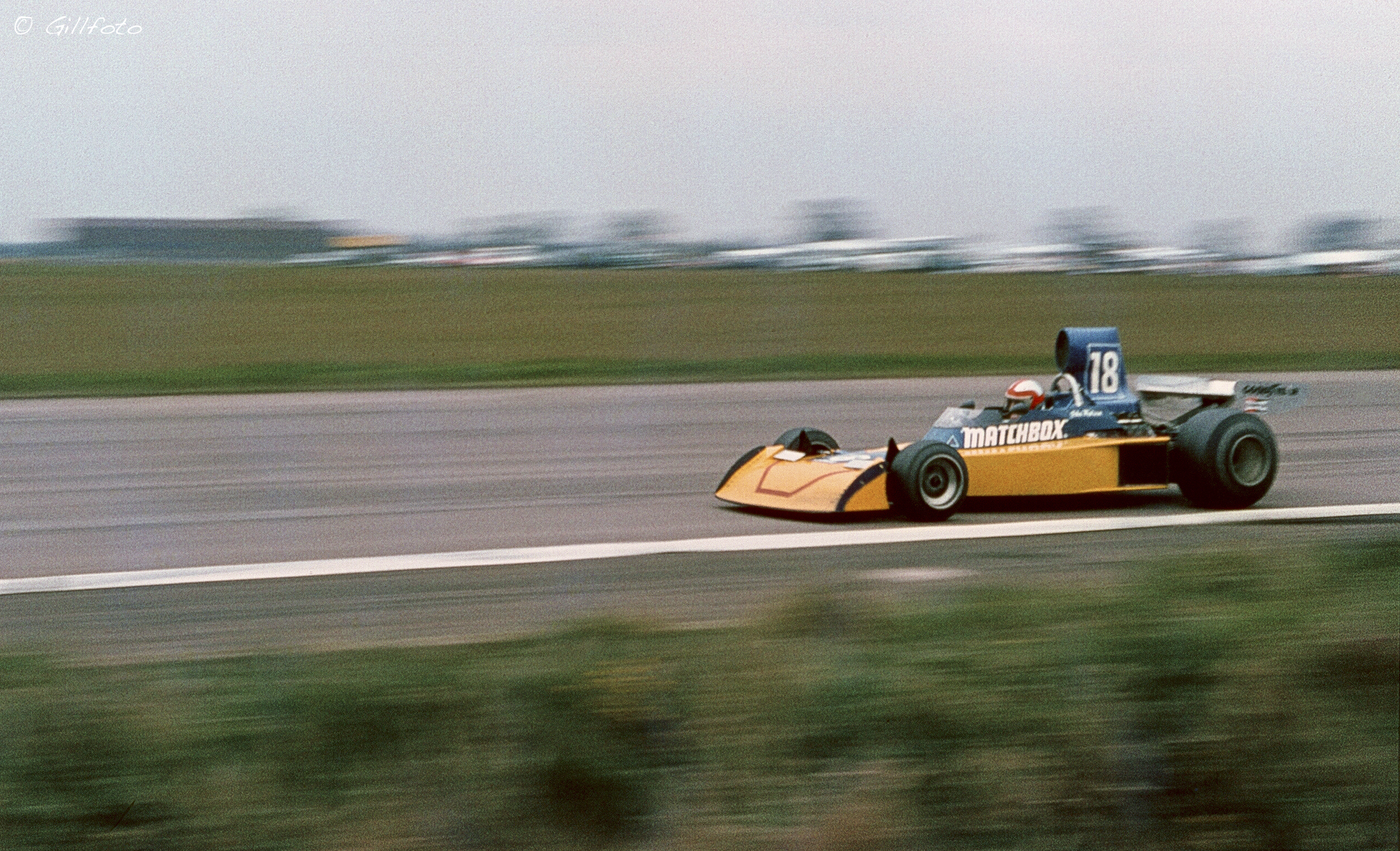
John Watson driving for Surtees in the British Grand Prix

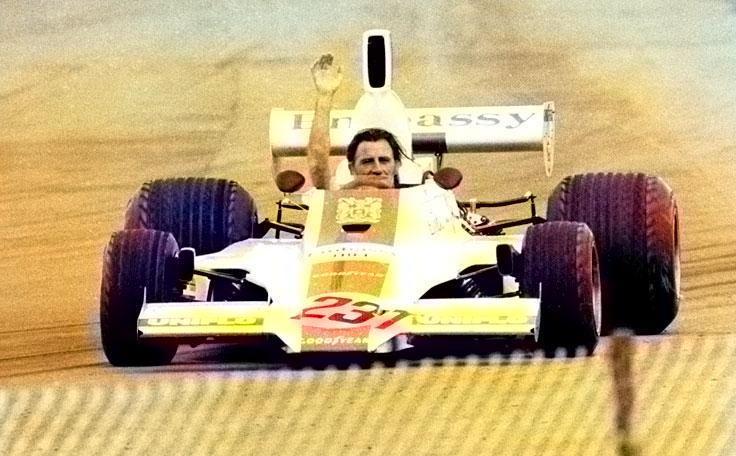
Graham Hill waving to the crowd in his farewell lap before the 1975 British Grand Prix, after announcing his retirement. Later in the year, he would tragically pass away in an airplane crash.

- The Williams had lost their sponsorship from Iso and Marlboro and entered two cars under their own name for the first time.
- Having driven for Brabham in 1972 and 1973, Wilson Fittipaldi entered this season with his own team and chassis. He drove the car himself and managed to launch two new developments of the car during the year.
- Denny Hulme retired at the end of the 1974 season. Jochen Mass, who already drove the last two races for McLaren, was signed for a full season with the team.
- March signed Lella Lombardi. She was the first woman to qualify in an F1 race since Maria Teresa de Filippis in 1958.
- John Watson was signed by Surtees, after entering all 1974 races in a private Brabham.

==== Mid-season changes ====
- After two races, Bob Evans replaced Mike Wilds at BRM, Jacky Ickx left Lotus halfway through the season.
- Embassy Racing, owned by Graham Hill, entered a Lola chassis for the first three races and then their first Hill chassis. The only difference, however, was the employment of their designer and subsequent naming of the chassis.
- Ensign missed the first part of the season but returned with a duo of Dutch drivers, Roelof Wunderink and Gijs van Lennep, following new sponsorship by the Dutch security company HB Bewaking.
- John Nicholson had won the 1973 and 1974 British Formula Atlantic Championship in a Lyncar 005, before he debuted in the 1975 British Grand Prix with a Lyncar-commissioned F1 chassis. He also tried this in 1974, but had not managed to qualify on that attempt.
- Shadow trialled a Matra V12 engine for two races, but Jean-Pierre Jarier retired on both occasions.
- American Mark Donohue died in August, two days after crashing in practice for the Austrian Grand Prix. John Watson was released from Surtees to drive for Penske and would stay with the American team in 1976.
- Nearing the end of 1974, Chris Amon had retired his own team and drove two races for BRM. He returned to F1 near the end of the 1975 season with Ensign.

== Calendar ==
Round	Grand Prix	Circuit	Date
1	Argentine Grand Prix	(Argentina) Autódromo de Buenos Aires, Buenos Aires	12 January
2	Brazilian Grand Prix	(Brazil) Autodromo de Interlagos, São Paulo	26 January
3	South African Grand Prix	(South Africa) Kyalami Grand Prix Circuit, Midrand	1 March
4	Spanish Grand Prix	(Spain) Montjuïc Circuit, Barcelona	27 April
5	Monaco Grand Prix	Circuit de Monaco, Monte Carlo	11 May
6	Belgian Grand Prix	(Belgium) Circuit Zolder, Heusden-Zolder	25 May
7	Swedish Grand Prix	(Sweden) Scandinavian Raceway, Anderstorp	8 June
8	Dutch Grand Prix	(Netherlands) Circuit Park Zandvoort, Zandvoort	22 June
9	French Grand Prix	(France) Circuit Paul Ricard, Le Castellet	6 July
10	British Grand Prix	(United Kingdom) Silverstone Circuit, Silverstone	19 July
11	German Grand Prix	(West Germany) Nürburgring, Nürburg	3 August
12	Austrian Grand Prix	(Austria) Österreichring, Spielberg	17 August
13	Italian Grand Prix	(Italy) Autodromo Nazionale di Monza, Monza	7 September
14	United States Grand Prix	(United States) Watkins Glen Grand Prix Course, New York	5 October

=== Calendar changes ===
- The Spanish Grand Prix was moved from Jarama to Montjuïc, in keeping with the event-sharing arrangement between the two circuits. Likewise, the French Grand Prix was moved from Circuit de Dijon-Prenois to Circuit Paul Ricard, and the British Grand Prix was moved from Brands Hatch to Silverstone.
- The Belgian Grand Prix and Monaco Grand Prix swapped places on the calendar so that the Monaco round followed the Belgian Grand Prix.
- The Canadian Grand Prix was originally scheduled to be the penultimate race in 1975 but was cancelled due to a small row between Formula One Constructors' Association and Mosport Park about payments.

== Regulation changes ==
- Fire-resistant race suits were made obligatory.
- The concept of marshal posts, with service roads leading to and from them, was created and implemented at various circuits. Also, from now on, marshals had to practice rescuing drivers from their cars.

== Season report ==
=== Race 1: Argentina ===
The drivers went to Argentina to start the season, and it was Jean-Pierre Jarier in the Shadow who took pole position with the Brabhams of Carlos Pace and Carlos Reutemann second and third on the grid. However, poleman Jarier could not even start the race because his transmission failed on the parade lap. Home hero Reutemann took the lead from teammate Pace, with Niki Lauda's Ferrari third.

Pace passed teammate Reutemann to take the lead but then spun off and dropped to seventh. James Hunt in his Hesketh soon overtook Lauda and then Reutemann, much to the chagrin of the crowd. By then, reigning world champion Emerson Fittipaldi in his McLaren was past Lauda and up to third, and soon took Reutemann for second as well. Fittipaldi closed in on Hunt and took the lead with 18 laps left. Pace recovered to fourth after his spin, but it was to no avail as his engine blew up. Fittipaldi started his title defence with a win, Hunt was a superb second, and Reutemann third in front of his home crowd.

=== Race 2: Brazil ===
The second round was in Brazil, and Jarier took pole position again with Fittipaldi alongside and Reutemann third. Reutemann, just like in Argentina, took the lead at the start from Jarier and Pace was up to third, whereas home driver Fittipaldi dropped to seventh. Jarier retook the lead from Reutemann on lap 5 and then pulled away. Reutemann struggled with handling issues and dropped well down the order then, with Pace up to second, Clay Regazzoni's Ferrari third and Fittipaldi recovering to fourth. Jarier's engine stopped with seven laps left and Pace took the lead. Regazzoni was up to second but dropped behind Fittipaldi and Jochen Mass in the second McLaren as he too suffered handling issues. Pace took a home victory, with countryman Fittipaldi second and Mass third.

=== Race 3: South Africa ===
A month after the Brazilian race, the field went to South Africa and Pace followed up his win with pole, with Reutemann alongside as Brabham locked out the front row, and home hero Jody Scheckter was third in the Tyrrell. Pace led at the start, with Scheckter second, and Ronnie Peterson in his Lotus jumped up from eighth to take third. However, the Swede did not have the pace of the front runners and dropped back down the order. Scheckter took the lead from Pace on the third lap, to the delight to the fans. Pace kept second until he struggled with tyres and was passed by Reutemann and the second Tyrrell of Patrick Depailler. Scheckter took an emotional home victory, with Reutemann and Depailler completing the podium.

=== Race 4: Spain ===
Nearly two months after the third round, the European season began in Spain at the very fast Montjuic street circuit in Barcelona. The Grand Prix Drivers Association was not happy with the state of the barriers, which were not bolted properly, and the drivers threatened not to take part. Mechanics from the teams went around the entire circuit to attempt to repair/fasten down the barriers. After work was done on the circuit, the drivers agreed that the circuit was still not safe enough. Reigning world champion and championship leader Emerson Fittipaldi had no intention to race because of the condition of the barriers, and went home on Sunday morning. The organisers of the event then locked the cars and motorhomes inside the circuit confines for breach of contract and threatened to keep them there. This being incompatible with the schedule for the next race at Monaco, the teams decided to cater for the organisers wishes and raced anyway.

The rest of the drivers were there for qualifying, and Ferrari took the front row, with Lauda on pole from Regazzoni, and Hunt third in the Hesketh. There was chaos at the start when Mario Andretti in his Parnelli tapped the car of polesitter Lauda, sending it into the sister car of Regazzoni and knocking both Ferraris out of contention. Hunt gratefully took the lead, and Andretti, whose car was undamaged was second. Hunt led until he crashed after spinning on oil on the track, leaving Andretti leading from John Watson in the Surtees and Rolf Stommelen's Hill. Watson then had to pit with a vibration and the leader Andretti retired after a suspension failure sent him into the guardrail. This promoted Pace to second and Peterson to third, but the Swede retired after colliding with backmarker François Migault while lapping him.

On lap 26, Stommelen's rear wing broke, and the car bounced into the barriers and flew back onto the road, hitting the barrier on the other side but the momentum of the car was enough for it to fly over the barrier where spectators were watching. The car hit some of them, and four persons were killed, and Stommelen and other spectators were injured. Pace also crashed while trying to avoid the Hill as it bounced back off the road. The race went on for the moment, with Jochen Mass passing Jacky Ickx's Lotus to lead. The organizers stopped the race on lap 30 due to the debris on the track caused by Stommelen's crash. Mass was declared the winner, with Ickx second and Reutemann third. Only half points were awarded as the race was stopped before it had run 75% of its full course. With Lella Lombardi's March in sixth when the race was stopped, she received half a point, becoming, to date, the first and only female Formula One driver to score points in a championship race.

=== Race 5: Monaco ===
After the chaotic and tragic Spanish GP, the race on the streets of Monaco was next. Lauda took pole ahead of the Shadow of Tom Pryce, with Pryce's teammate Jarier third. Rain before the race meant that it was started on a damp track. Lauda took off into the lead and Jarier climbed up to second but crashed on the first lap. Peterson was up to second, and Pryce was third. Pryce spun off after 20 laps, giving third to Scheckter. The field soon pitted for dry weather tyres and this shuffled up the order, with Scheckter dropping back after pitting too late. Fittipaldi was up to second behind Lauda, and Pace jumped up to third. That is how it stayed, with Lauda winning, Fittipaldi second and Pace third.

It was the last weekend for Graham Hill in Formula One.

=== Race 6: Belgium ===
The next race took place in Belgium, and Lauda was on pole with Pace with him on the front row, and Vittorio Brambilla in the March a surprising third. It was Pace who got the better of Lauda at the start, to lead into the first corner. Pace was leading from Lauda and Brambilla at the end of the first lap, but Brambilla was on the move, and shocked everyone by overtaking both the front-row starters to lead. But this spurred Lauda into action, and after almost immediately passing Pace, he took the lead from Brambilla on the sixth lap. Scheckter was also on the move and was up to second, after passing Brambilla on lap 9. Brambilla held third until he was forced to pit with tyre troubles. Lauda won, becoming the first driver to take two wins this season, with Scheckter second and Reutemann third.

=== Race 7: Sweden ===
In Sweden, it was Brambilla who took his first career pole, with Depailler second and Jarier third on the grid. The order was unchanged at the start, with Brambilla leading but Reutemann was up to third after three laps. Brambilla continued to lead, whereas second-placed Depailler dropped out of contention with brake problems. Reutemann was up to second, and now took the lead from Brambilla. Brambilla had to pit for new tyres almost immediately. Jarier ran second now, but his engine blew up and this gave the position to Pace until he spun off and retired. Lauda was now second, and towards the end of the race Reutemann began to suffer from oversteer, allowing Lauda to take the lead with 10 laps left. Lauda went on to win, with Reutemann and Regazzoni completing the podium.

=== Race 8: Netherlands ===
The first race in the second half of the season took place in the Netherlands, and pole went to Lauda as usual, with teammate Regazzoni alongside, and Hunt's Hesketh third. The race started on a damp track and Lauda took the lead, with Scheckter up to second ahead of Regazzoni. The order was unchanged until the drivers had to pit for dry tyres. Hunt and Jarier pitted early, and their gamble paid off as they were first and second, with Lauda, Scheckter and Regazzoni third, fourth and fifth respectively. Lauda passed Jarier for second midway through the race, and started closing on Hunt. Jarier almost immediately retired with a tyre failure, and Scheckter who inherited third had his engine blow up with just 12 laps left. Hunt held off Lauda to take his first career win, with Regazzoni completing the podium.

=== Race 9: France ===
France was host to the 9th round of the season at Paul Ricard, and it was Lauda on pole ahead of Scheckter and Hunt. The top three maintained their starting positions into the first corner. In the early laps, Regazzoni was on a charge, and got up to second on the sixth lap but his engine blew up and he had to retire. Scheckter soon faded away, giving Hunt second. That was how it ended, with Lauda winning to take a large championship lead, Hunt finishing second and Mass third.

=== Race 10: Great Britain ===
The tenth round was held at the Silverstone airfield circuit in Great Britain, and Tom Pryce took a home pole position, with Pace second and championship leader Lauda third. Pace beat Pryce into the first corner, with Regazzoni third ahead of Lauda. After 10 laps, Regazzoni passed Pryce for second, and soon both of them passed Pace. It soon began to rain, and Regazzoni was pulling away until he spun off, hit a barrier and damaged his rear wing. He rejoined two laps down. Pryce now led, but he crashed out as well, two laps later. Scheckter had meanwhile passed both Lauda and Pace, and he was now leading.

Scheckter pitted for wet tyres from the lead, and most drivers followed suit. Hunt (after passing Pace) was the leader from Pace and Emerson Fittipaldi as they had not pitted for dries. Scheckter and Jarier both caught and passed the trio, but the track was drying out, and both had to pit for dries soon after. Hunt began to lose power in his engine, and was passed by Fittipaldi, and then Pace, and even a recovering Scheckter. On lap 56 out of 70, the rain fell again, in a massive shower with the whole field on dries. Nearly all the drivers spun off and crashed, and race was stopped. Only 6 drivers were left (notably Fittipaldi). The race was stopped, and the results were declared on the lap before the storm struck. Fittipaldi was the winner, and Pace and Scheckter, despite crashing out, were given second and third.

The result meant that Fittipaldi closed within 14 points of Lauda with five races left.

=== Race 11: West Germany ===
The drivers had to go to West Germany, in the legendary Nordschleife track, for round 11- and this proved to be the most crucial round in the championship (the German Grand Prix often was). Lauda was on pole, lapping the 14.2 mi (22.8 km) circuit in under 7 minutes- becoming the first driver to accomplish this feat. Pace was on the front row, and the two Tyrrell drivers Scheckter and Depailler third and fourth respectively. At the start, Lauda led from Pace, with Depailler getting third from his teammate Scheckter, who made a dreadful start and dropped to 20th. Depailler was past Pace early on, but by midway through the race, both drivers were out of contention, Pace retiring with a puncture, and Depailler having to pit after a suspension failure. Lauda continued to lead with Regazzoni up to second, until the latter's engine failed. Lauda then suffered a puncture and a damaged spoiler and had to pit, leaving Reutemann to lead from Hunt and Pryce. Hunt was next to retire, with a wheel hub failure on the straight behind the pits, and Pryce took second, but only briefly as he had to back off towards the end with fuel-feed troubles. At the front, Reutemann took his first win of the season, with Jacques Laffite's Williams second, and Lauda recovering to third.

=== Race 12: Austria ===
The Austrian GP on 17 August had a very large attendance, as Lauda had a chance of getting close to the championship at his home race. Lauda did not disappoint them, as he took pole position, with Hunt second and Fittipaldi third. His chief rival, Reutemann, was only 11th. On a morning practice lap, Mark Donohue's March slid off the track after a tyre failure and hit two marshals. Donohue died two days later, and one of the marshals also died.

It began to rain just before the race started, but it did not deter Lauda, who led from Hunt and Depailler. Depailler soon dropped back, and it was Vittorio Brambilla who was up to third. Lauda also began to struggle as the rain became heavier, and Hunt took the lead and Brambilla second on lap 15. Brambilla went to take the lead from Hunt four laps later when they were lapping a backmarker, whereas Pryce passed Lauda for third. Conditions became so bad that the organizers showed the chequered flag early, with Brambilla the winner (he spun off on the slowing down lap and crashed, and drove around to the pits waving to the fans with a badly damaged car), Hunt second and Pryce completing the podium. Only half points were given, as the race was stopped early, just like in Spain.

=== Race 13: Italy ===
The penultimate round was in Italy, and after the cancellation of the Canadian GP, Lauda needed only half a point to be the 1975 world champion. The Ferrari fans were very happy as their team locked out the front row, with Lauda on pole from Regazzoni, and Fittipaldi third. Regazzoni took the lead at the start, with Lauda and Mass following. Soon Reutemann was up to third, but he needed to win to keep any faint hopes alive. However, he was passed by Fittipaldi, and towards the end, Lauda backed off and let Fittipaldi through. It was Regazzoni who won the race, with Fittipaldi second, and Lauda's third was enough to seal the championship.

=== Race 14: United States ===
The final round took place in the US, and it was no surprise that at the spectacular Watkins Glen track in upstate New York (which had a new chicane at the Esses introduced), new World Champion Lauda took pole again, with Fittipaldi alongside and Reutemann third. Lauda led into the first corner from Fittipaldi, and it was Jarier in third. Lauda and Fittipaldi drove away from the rest of the field, whereas Jarier retired with a wheel failure one-third into the race. This left Hunt in third, but Mass had other ideas and took the place midway through the race. Lauda went on to win, his fifth of the season, as he signed off in style, with Fittipaldi close behind in second, and Mass also on the podium.

== Results and standings ==
=== Grands Prix ===
Round	Grand Prix	Pole position	Fastest lap	Winning driver	Winning constructor	Report
1	(Argentina) Argentine Grand Prix	(France) Jean-Pierre Jarier (Note: Jean-Pierre Jarier set the fastest time in qualifying, but did not start the race. Pole position was left vacant on the grid. Carlos Pace, in the second slot, was the first driver on the grid. Jarier is still considered to have held pole position.)	(United Kingdom) James Hunt	(Brazil) Emerson Fittipaldi	(United Kingdom) McLaren-Ford	Report
2	(Brazil) Brazilian Grand Prix	(France) Jean-Pierre Jarier	(France) Jean-Pierre Jarier	(Brazil) Carlos Pace	(United Kingdom) Brabham-Ford	Report
3	(South Africa) South African Grand Prix	(Brazil) Carlos Pace	(Brazil) Carlos Pace	(South Africa) Jody Scheckter	(United Kingdom) Tyrrell-Ford	Report
4	(Spain) Spanish Grand Prix	(Austria) Niki Lauda	(United States) Mario Andretti	(West Germany) Jochen Mass	(United Kingdom) McLaren-Ford	Report
5	Monaco Grand Prix	(Austria) Niki Lauda	(France) Patrick Depailler	(Austria) Niki Lauda	(Italy) Ferrari	Report
6	(Belgium) Belgian Grand Prix	(Austria) Niki Lauda	(Switzerland) Clay Regazzoni	(Austria) Niki Lauda	(Italy) Ferrari	Report
7	(Sweden) Swedish Grand Prix	(Italy) Vittorio Brambilla	(Austria) Niki Lauda	(Austria) Niki Lauda	(Italy) Ferrari	Report
8	(Netherlands) Dutch Grand Prix	(Austria) Niki Lauda	(Austria) Niki Lauda	(United Kingdom) James Hunt	(United Kingdom) Hesketh-Ford	Report
9	(France) French Grand Prix	(Austria) Niki Lauda	(West Germany) Jochen Mass	(Austria) Niki Lauda	(Italy) Ferrari	Report
10	(United Kingdom) British Grand Prix	(United Kingdom) Tom Pryce	(Switzerland) Clay Regazzoni	(Brazil) Emerson Fittipaldi	(United Kingdom) McLaren-Ford	Report
11	(West Germany) German Grand Prix	(Austria) Niki Lauda	(Switzerland) Clay Regazzoni	(Argentina) Carlos Reutemann	(United Kingdom) Brabham-Ford	Report
12	(Austria) Austrian Grand Prix	(Austria) Niki Lauda	(Italy) Vittorio Brambilla	(Italy) Vittorio Brambilla	(United Kingdom) March-Ford	Report
13	(Italy) Italian Grand Prix	(Austria) Niki Lauda	(Switzerland) Clay Regazzoni	(Switzerland) Clay Regazzoni	(Italy) Ferrari	Report
14	United States Grand Prix	(Austria) Niki Lauda	(Brazil) Emerson Fittipaldi	(Austria) Niki Lauda	(Italy) Ferrari	Report

=== Scoring system ===
Points were awarded to the top six classified finishers. The International Cup for F1 Manufacturers only counted the points of the highest-finishing driver for each race. For both the Championship and the Cup, the best six results from rounds 1–7 and the best six results from rounds 8–14 were counted.

Numbers without parentheses are championship points; numbers in parentheses are total points scored. Points were awarded in the following system:

Position	1st	2nd	3rd	4th	5th	6th
Race	9	6	4	3	2	1

=== World Drivers' Championship standings ===
Pos	Driver	ARG (Argentina)	BRA (Brazil)	RSA (South Africa)	ESP^{‡} (Spain)	MON (Monaco)	BEL (Belgium)	SWE (Sweden)	NED (Netherlands)	FRA (France)	GBR (United Kingdom)	GER (West Germany)	AUT^{‡} (Austria)	ITA (Italy)	USA (United States)	Pts
1	(Austria) Niki Lauda	6	5	5	Ret^{P}	1^{P}	1^{P}	1^{F}	2^{P}^{F}	1^{P}	8	3^{P}	6^{P}	3^{P}	1^{P}	64.5
2	(Brazil) Emerson Fittipaldi	1	2	NC	DNS	2	7	8	Ret	4	1	Ret	9	2	2^{F}	45
3	(Argentina) Carlos Reutemann	3	8	2	3	9	3	2	4	14	Ret	1	14	4	Ret	37
4	(United Kingdom) James Hunt	2^{F}	6	Ret	Ret	Ret	Ret	Ret	1	2	4	Ret	2	5	4	33
5	(Switzerland) Clay Regazzoni	4	4	16	NC	Ret	5^{F}	3	3	Ret	13^{F}	Ret^{F}	7	1^{F}	Ret	25
6	(Brazil) Carlos Pace	Ret	1	4^{P}^{F}	Ret	3	8	Ret	5	Ret	2	Ret	Ret	Ret	Ret	24
7	(South Africa) Jody Scheckter	11	Ret	1	Ret	7	2	7	16	9	3	Ret	8	8	6	20
8	(West Germany) Jochen Mass	14	3	6	1	6	Ret	Ret	Ret	3^{F}	7	Ret	4	Ret	3	20
9	(France) Patrick Depailler	5	Ret	3	Ret	5^{F}	4	12	9	6	9	9	11	7	Ret	12
10	(United Kingdom) Tom Pryce	12	Ret	9	Ret	Ret	6	Ret	6	Ret	Ret^{P}	4	3	6	NC	8
11	(Italy) Vittorio Brambilla	9	Ret	Ret	5	Ret	Ret	Ret^{P}	Ret	Ret	6	Ret	1^{F}	Ret	7	6.5
12	(France) Jacques Laffite	Ret	11	NC		DNQ	Ret		Ret	11	Ret	2	Ret	Ret	DNS	6
13	(Sweden) Ronnie Peterson	Ret	15	10	Ret	4	Ret	9	15	10	Ret	Ret	5	Ret	5	6
14	(United States) Mario Andretti	Ret	7	17	Ret^{F}	Ret		4		5	12	10	Ret	Ret	Ret	5
15	(United States) Mark Donohue	7	Ret	8	Ret	Ret	11	5	8	Ret	5	Ret	DNS			4
16	(Belgium) Jacky Ickx	8	9	12	2	8	Ret	15	Ret	Ret						3
17	(Australia) Alan Jones				Ret	Ret	Ret	11	13	16	10	5				2
18	(France) Jean-Pierre Jarier	DNS^{P}	Ret^{P}^{F}	Ret	4	Ret	Ret	Ret	Ret	8	14	Ret	Ret	Ret	Ret	1.5
19	(United Kingdom) Tony Brise				7		Ret	6	7	7	15	Ret	15	Ret	Ret	1
20	(Netherlands) Gijs van Lennep								10	15		6				1
21	(Italy) Lella Lombardi			Ret	6	DNQ	Ret	Ret	14	18	Ret	7	17	Ret	DNS	0.5
—	(West Germany) Rolf Stommelen	13	14	7	Ret								16	Ret		0
—	(United Kingdom) John Watson	DSQ	10	Ret	8	Ret	10	16	Ret	13	11	Ret	10		9	0
—	(Austria) Harald Ertl											8	Ret	9		0
—	(West Germany) Hans-Joachim Stuck										Ret	Ret	Ret	Ret	8	0
—	(United Kingdom) Bob Evans			15	Ret	DNQ	9	13	Ret	17			Ret	Ret		0
—	(Brazil) Wilson Fittipaldi	Ret	13	DNQ	Ret	DNQ	12	17	11	Ret	19	Ret	DNS		10	0
—	(United Kingdom) Graham Hill	10	12	DNQ		DNQ										0
—	(United States) Brett Lunger												13	10	Ret	0
—	(Sweden) Torsten Palm					DNQ		10								0
—	(Italy) Arturo Merzario	NC	Ret	Ret	Ret	DNQ	Ret							11		0
—	(South Africa) Guy Tunmer			11												0
—	(New Zealand) Chris Amon												12	12		0
—	(South Africa) Ian Scheckter			Ret				Ret	12							0
—	(France) Jean-Pierre Jabouille									12						0
—	(United Kingdom) Jim Crawford										Ret			13		0
—	(South Africa) Eddie Keizan			13												0
—	(South Africa) Dave Charlton			14												0
—	(United Kingdom) Damien Magee							14								0
—	(Italy) Renzo Zorzi													14		0
—	(United Kingdom) Brian Henton										16		DNS		NC	0
—	(New Zealand) John Nicholson										17					0
—	(United Kingdom) Dave Morgan										18					0
—	(Netherlands) Roelof Wunderink				Ret	DNQ					DNQ		NC	DNQ	Ret	0
—	(France) François Migault				NC		Ret			DNS						0
—	(United Kingdom) Mike Wilds	Ret	Ret													0
—	(Australia) Vern Schuppan							Ret								0
—	(United Kingdom) Ian Ashley											DNS				0
—	(Switzerland) Jo Vonlanthen												Ret			0
—	(France) Michel Leclère														Ret	0
—	(Japan) Hiroshi Fushida								DNS		DNQ					0
—	(United Kingdom) Tony Trimmer											DNQ	DNQ	DNQ		0
Pos	Driver	ARG (Argentina)	BRA (Brazil)	RSA (South Africa)	ESP^{‡} (Spain)	MON (Monaco)	BEL (Belgium)	SWE (Sweden)	NED (Netherlands)	FRA (France)	GBR (United Kingdom)	GER (West Germany)	AUT^{‡} (Austria)	ITA (Italy)	USA (United States)	Pts

Key
Colour	Result
Gold	Winner
Silver	Second place
Bronze	Third place
Green	Other points position
Blue	Other classified position
Blue	Not classified, finished (NC)
Purple	Not classified, retired (Ret)
Red	Did not qualify (DNQ)
Black	Disqualified (DSQ)
White	Did not start (DNS)
White	Race cancelled (C)
Blank	Did not practice (DNP)
Blank	Excluded (EX)
Blank	Did not arrive (DNA)
Blank	Withdrawn (WD)
Blank	Did not enter (empty cell)
Annotation	Meaning
P	Pole position
F	Fastest lap

- ^{‡} Half points were awarded because the races were stopped before 75% of the scheduled distance was completed.

=== International Cup for F1 Manufacturers standings ===
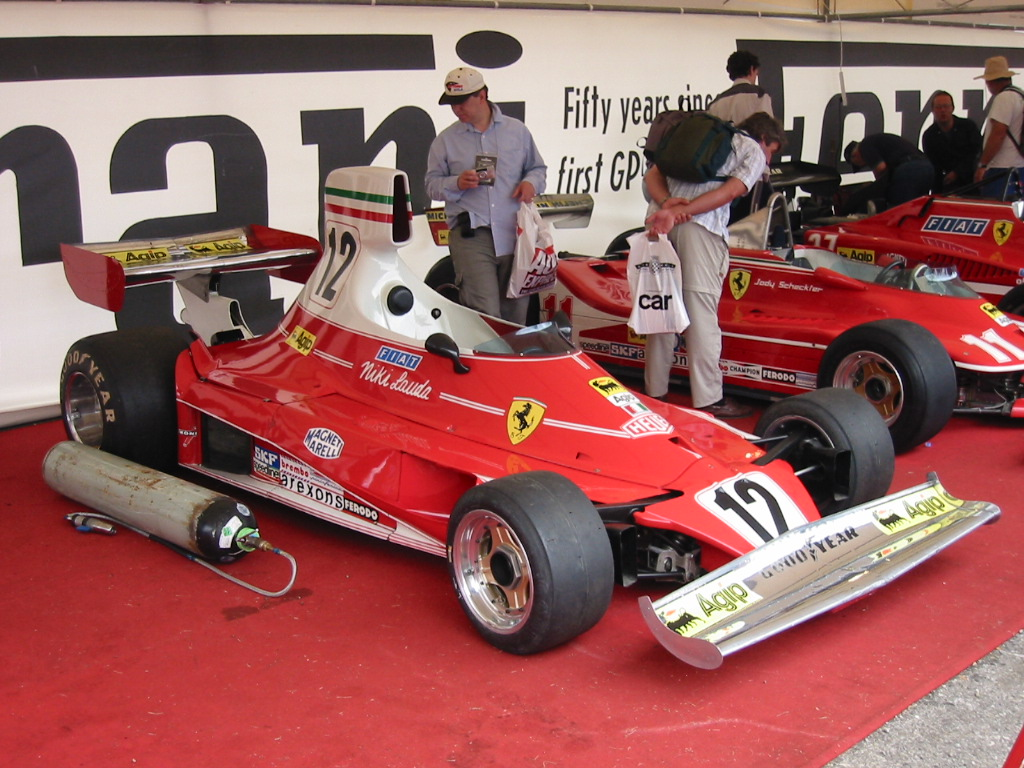
Ferrari won the 1975 International Cup for F1 Manufacturers with the 312B3 and the 312T (pictured)

Pos	Constructor	ARG (Argentina)	BRA (Brazil)	RSA (South Africa)	ESP^{‡} (Spain)	MON (Monaco)	BEL (Belgium)	SWE (Sweden)	NED (Netherlands)	FRA (France)	GBR (United Kingdom)	GER (West Germany)	AUT^{‡} (Austria)	ITA (Italy)	USA (United States)	Pts
1	(Italy) Ferrari	4	4	5	NC	1	1	1	2	1	8	3	6	1	1	72.5
2	(United Kingdom) Brabham-Ford	3	1	2	(3)	3	3	2	4	14	2	1	14	4	Ret	54 (56)
3	(United Kingdom) McLaren-Ford	1	2	6	1	2	7	8	Ret	3	1	Ret	4	2	2	53
4	(United Kingdom) Hesketh-Ford	2	6	Ret	Ret	Ret	Ret	10	1	2	4	8	2	5	4	33
5	(United Kingdom) Tyrrell-Ford	5	Ret	1	Ret	5	2	7	9	6	3	9	8	7	6	25
6	(United States) Shadow-Ford	12	Ret	9	4	Ret	6	Ret	6	8	14	4	3	6	NC	9.5
7	(United Kingdom) Lotus-Ford	8	9	10	2	4	Ret	9	15	10	16	Ret	5	13	5	9
8	(United Kingdom) March-Ford	9	Ret	Ret	5	Ret	Ret	Ret	14	18	5	7	1	Ret	7	7.5
9	(United Kingdom) Williams-Ford	NC	11	NC	7	DNQ	Ret	14	12	11	Ret	2	Ret	14	DNS	6
10	(United States) Parnelli-Ford	Ret	7	17	Ret	Ret		4		5	12	10	Ret	Ret	Ret	5
11	(United Kingdom) Hill-Ford				NC	DNQ	Ret	6	7	7	10	5	15	Ret	Ret	3
12	(United States) Penske-Ford	7	Ret	8	Ret	Ret	11	5	8	Ret					9	2
13	(United Kingdom) Ensign-Ford					DNQ			10	15	DNQ	6	12	12	Ret	1
—	(United Kingdom) Lola-Ford	10	12	7		DNQ										0
—	(United Kingdom) Surtees-Ford	DSQ	10	Ret	8	Ret	10	16	Ret	13	11		10			0
—	(United Kingdom) BRM	Ret	Ret	15	Ret	DNQ	9	13	Ret	17			Ret	Ret		0
—	(Brazil) Fittipaldi-Ford	Ret	13	DNQ	Ret	DNQ	12	17	11	Ret	19	Ret	DNS	11	10	0
—	(United Kingdom) Lyncar-Ford										17					0
—	(United States) Shadow-Matra												Ret	Ret		0
—	(Japan) Maki-Ford								DNS		DNQ	DNQ	DNQ	DNQ		0
Pos	Constructor	ARG (Argentina)	BRA (Brazil)	RSA (South Africa)	ESP^{‡} (Spain)	MON (Monaco)	BEL (Belgium)	SWE (Sweden)	NED (Netherlands)	FRA (France)	GBR (United Kingdom)	GER (West Germany)	AUT^{‡} (Austria)	ITA (Italy)	USA (United States)	Pts

- Bold results counted to championship.
- ^{‡} Half points awarded because the races were stopped before 75% of the scheduled distance was completed.

== Non-championship races ==
Other Formula One races were also held in 1975, which did not count towards the World Championship.

Race name	Circuit	Date	Winning driver	Constructor	Report
(United Kingdom) X Race of Champions	Brands Hatch	16 March	(United Kingdom) Tom Pryce	(United States) Shadow-Cosworth	Report
(United Kingdom) XXVII BRDC International Trophy	Silverstone	13 April	(Austria) Niki Lauda	(Italy) Ferrari	Report
(France) XV Swiss Grand Prix	Dijon-Prenois	24 August	(Switzerland) Clay Regazzoni	(Italy) Ferrari	Report

=== South African Formula One Championship ===
Race name	Circuit	Date	Winning driver	Constructor	Report
(South Africa) Cape South Easter Trophy	Killarney	8 February	(South Africa) Dave Charlton	(United Kingdom) McLaren-Cosworth	Report
(South Africa) Goldfields 100	Goldfields	22 March	(South Africa) Ian Scheckter	(United Kingdom) Tyrrell-Cosworth	Report
(South Africa) Natal Mercury 100	Roy Hesketh	29 March	(South Africa) Ian Scheckter	(United Kingdom) Tyrrell-Cosworth	Report
(South Africa) Brandkop Winter Trophy	Brandkop	3 May	(South Africa) Ian Scheckter	(United Kingdom) Tyrrell-Cosworth	Report
(South Africa) South African Republic Trophy	Kyalami	31 May	(South Africa) Ian Scheckter	(United Kingdom) Tyrrell-Cosworth	Report
(South Africa) False Bay 100	Killarney	5 July	(South Africa) Guy Tunmer	(United Kingdom) Lotus-Cosworth	Report
(South Africa) Rand Winter Trophy	Kyalami	26 July	(South Africa) Ian Scheckter	(United Kingdom) Tyrrell-Cosworth	Report
(South Africa) Natal Spring Trophy	Roy Hesketh	1 September	(South Africa) Dave Charlton	(United Kingdom) McLaren-Cosworth	Report
(South Africa) Rand Spring Trophy	Kyalami	4 October	(South Africa) Ian Scheckter	(United Kingdom) Tyrrell-Cosworth	Report
