= 1975 Austrian Grand Prix =

Race details
- Date: 17 August 1975
- Official name: XIII Memphis Großer Preis von Österreich
- Location: Spielberg, Austria
- Course: Permanent racing facility
- Course length: 5.911 km (3.673 miles)
- Distance: 29 laps, 171.419 km (106.517 miles)
- Scheduled distance: 54 laps, 319.914 km (198.342 miles)
- Weather: Heavy rain

Pole position
Driver	(Austria) Niki Lauda	Ferrari
- Time: 1:34.85

Fastest lap
Driver	(Italy) Vittorio Brambilla	March-Ford
- Time: 1:53.90

Podium
First	(Italy) Vittorio Brambilla	March-Ford
Second	(United Kingdom) James Hunt	Hesketh-Ford
Third	(United Kingdom) Tom Pryce	Shadow-Ford

The 1975 Austrian Grand Prix was a Formula One motor race held at Österreichring on 17 August 1975. It was race 12 of 14 in both the 1975 World Championship of Drivers and the 1975 International Cup for Formula One Manufacturers. It was the eighth Austrian Grand Prix and the sixth to be held at the Österreichring. It was held over 29 of the scheduled 54 laps of the six kilometre circuit for a race distance of 171 kilometres. The race was shortened by heavy rain, meaning that only half points were awarded. The weekend itself was marred by the deaths of Mark Donohue and a track marshal in a practice crash.

Mastering the wet weather, the race was won by Italian driver Vittorio Brambilla driving a March 751. It was Brambilla's only Formula One win in his seven-year Grand Prix career. He took a 27-second win over British driver James Hunt in his Hesketh 308. Eight seconds further back was the Shadow DN5 of British driver Tom Pryce in the first of just two podiums in his abbreviated career.

== Qualifying summary ==
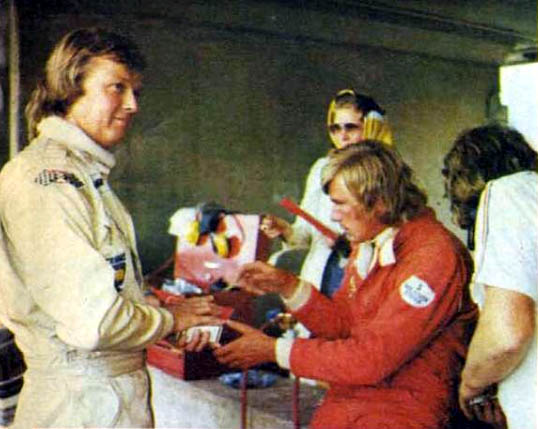
Ronnie Peterson (left) and James Hunt in the pits

Niki Lauda delighted his home crowd by claiming his seventh pole position of the year. Rolf Stommelen returned after his crash in Spain but could only muster 26th position for qualifying. Chris Amon had returned for Ensign but only being able to qualify in 24th. Brett Lunger qualified well in his début for Hesketh to start 17th.

== Practice crashes ==
Practice was marred by a series of accidents, Brian Henton crashing his Lotus when he hit an oil patch and Wilson Fittipaldi breaking two bones in his hand. During the warm-up on Sunday morning, Mark Donohue had a tyre failure and crashed at Vöest-Hügel, the flat-out right hander after the pits. The car went through catch fencing and advertising billboards lining the track. One track marshal was killed and another marshal was injured. Donohue was injured but suffered a brain hemorrhage after the accident and died two days later.

Donohue was the last driver for 41 years to die in a Formula One accident in the rain, until the death of Jules Bianchi in 2015 from injuries sustained at the 2014 Japanese Grand Prix.

== Race summary ==
As the grid formed up, there were reports of rain at the far side of the track. Thunderclouds were forming ominously and the cars were returned to the pits to change to wet tyres.

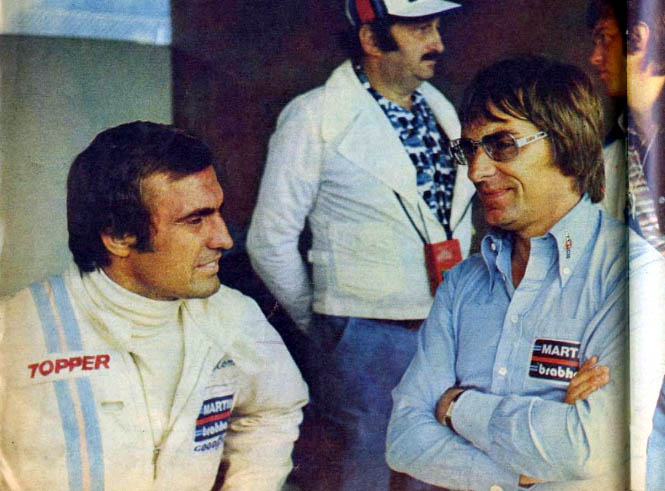
Argentine driver Carlos Reutemann (left) with Bernie Ecclestone

After 45 minutes, the grid reformed. Lauda led off the start from James Hunt and Patrick Depailler who had shot up from the fourth row. Mario Andretti spun off, whilst Bob Evans retired the BRM.

Vittorio Brambilla had shot through the spray to gain a third place, with Ronnie Peterson leaping from tenth to fourth.

By lap 12, it was obvious that Lauda's car was not set up fully to cope with wet conditions and by lap 15 Hunt stormed by to lead for the fifth time this season. However, this was to be short-lived. The Hesketh's engine was running on only seven cylinders and Brambilla was clambering all over the back of the car. Ahead of them Lunger was driving carefully in his first wet race and could not see the leaders approaching him. Brambilla seized the lead and it took a further two laps for Hunt to finally pass his teammate. Peterson had to pit to replace a faulty visor, whilst the Brabham drivers found they had been racing with one of their own rear tyres and one of their teammates'. Jochen Mass spun out of third place, and soon there was frantic activity between the Grand Prix Drivers' Association and the race officials as to whether the race should continue – it was brought to a halt on lap 29.

As Brambilla took the flag, he crashed into the barriers and the March team celebrated a historic victory. However, behind the scenes, there was confusion. Some teams were preparing for a restart, but as the race had already been stopped with the chequered flag, it could not happen anymore. The race results would stand, but with only half points awarded. Brambilla, the oldest man in the field at 37, had won his first and only Grand Prix.

This was the first of only two races where Shadow used a Matra engine instead of the Cosworth DFV in Jean-Pierre Jarier's Shadow DN7.

With neither Carlos Reutemann nor Emerson Fittipaldi featuring in the points, Niki Lauda's sixth position actually allowed him to expand his points lead to 17.5 points. If Lauda scored any points at all at the Italian Grand Prix the Austrian driver could claim the championship.

== Classification ==
=== Qualifying ===
Pos	No	Driver	Constructor	Time	Gap
1	12	(Austria) Niki Lauda	Ferrari	1:34.85	—
2	24	(United Kingdom) James Hunt	Hesketh-Ford	1:34.97	+0.12
3	1	(Brazil) Emerson Fittipaldi	McLaren-Ford	1:35.21	+0.36
4	10	(West Germany) Hans Joachim Stuck	March-Ford	1:35.38	+0.53
5	11	(Switzerland) Clay Regazzoni	Ferrari	1:35.41	+0.56
6	8	(Brazil) Carlos Pace	Brabham-Ford	1:35.71	+0.86
7	4	(France) Patrick Depailler	Tyrrell-Ford	1:35.78	+0.93
8	9	(Italy) Vittorio Brambilla	March-Ford	1:35.80	+0.95
9	2	(West Germany) Jochen Mass	McLaren-Ford	1:36.12	+1.27
10	3	(South Africa) Jody Scheckter	Tyrrell-Ford	1:36.14	+1.29
11	7	(Argentina) Carlos Reutemann	Brabham-Ford	1:36.43	+1.58
12	21	(France) Jacques Laffite	Williams-Ford	1:37.60	+2.75
13	5	(Sweden) Ronnie Peterson	Lotus-Ford	1:37.61	+2.76
14	17	(France) Jean-Pierre Jarier	Shadow-Matra	1:37.62	+2.77
15	16	(United Kingdom) Tom Pryce	Shadow-Ford	1:37.64	+2.79
16	23	(United Kingdom) Tony Brise	Hill-Ford	1:37.69	+2.84
17	25	(United States) Brett Lunger	Hesketh-Ford	1:37.87	+3.02
18	18	(United Kingdom) John Watson	Surtees-Ford	1:37.96	+3.11
19	27	(United States) Mario Andretti	Parnelli-Ford	1:37.97	+3.12
20	30	(Brazil) Wilson Fittipaldi	Fittipaldi-Ford	1:38.14	+3.29
21	28	(United States) Mark Donohue	March-Ford	1:38.19	+3.34
22	29	(Italy) Lella Lombardi	March-Ford	1:38.43	+3.58
23	6	(United Kingdom) Brian Henton	Lotus-Ford	1:38.72	+3.87
24	31	(New Zealand) Chris Amon	Ensign-Ford	1:38.75	+3.90
25	14	(United Kingdom) Bob Evans	BRM	1:39.53	+4.68
26	22	(West Germany) Rolf Stommelen	Hill-Ford	1:39.56	+4.71
27	32	(Austria) Harald Ertl	Hesketh-Ford	1:40.72	+5.87
28	33	(Netherlands) Roelof Wunderink	Ensign-Ford	1:42.58	+7.73
29	20	(Switzerland) Jo Vonlanthen	Williams-Ford	1:42.80	+7.95
30	35	(United Kingdom) Tony Trimmer	Maki-Ford	1:44.88	+10.03

*Positions in red indicate entries that failed to qualify.

=== Race ===
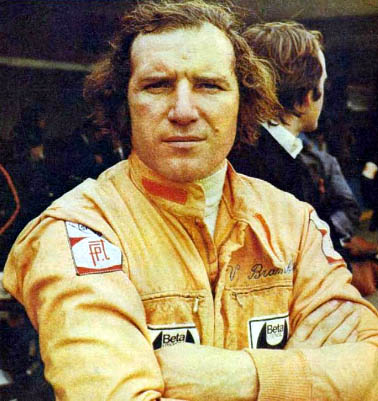
Italian Vittorio Brambilla, winner in a March-Ford

Pos	No	Driver	Constructor	Laps	Time/Retired	Grid	Points
1	9	(Italy) Vittorio Brambilla	March-Ford	29	0:57:56.69	8	4.5
2	24	(United Kingdom) James Hunt	Hesketh-Ford	29	+ 27.03	2	3
3	16	(United Kingdom) Tom Pryce	Shadow-Ford	29	+ 34.85	15	2
4	2	(West Germany) Jochen Mass	McLaren-Ford	29	+ 1:12.66	9	1.5
5	5	(Sweden) Ronnie Peterson	Lotus-Ford	29	+ 1:23.33	13	1
6	12	(Austria) Niki Lauda	Ferrari	29	+ 1:30.28	1	0.5
7	11	(Switzerland) Clay Regazzoni	Ferrari	29	+ 1:39.07	5	
8	3	(South Africa) Jody Scheckter	Tyrrell-Ford	28	+ 1 Lap	10	
9	1	(Brazil) Emerson Fittipaldi	McLaren-Ford	28	+ 1 Lap	3	
10	18	(United Kingdom) John Watson	Surtees-Ford	28	+ 1 Lap	18	
11	4	(France) Patrick Depailler	Tyrrell-Ford	28	+ 1 Lap	7	
12	31	(New Zealand) Chris Amon	Ensign-Ford	28	+ 1 Lap	24	
13	25	(United States) Brett Lunger	Hesketh-Ford	28	+ 1 Lap	17	
14	7	(Argentina) Carlos Reutemann	Brabham-Ford	28	+ 1 Lap	11	
15	23	(United Kingdom) Tony Brise	Hill-Ford	28	+ 1 Lap	16	
16	22	(West Germany) Rolf Stommelen	Hill-Ford	27	+ 2 Laps	26	
17	29	(Italy) Lella Lombardi	March-Ford	26	+ 3 Laps	22	
NC	33	(Netherlands) Roelof Wunderink	Ensign-Ford	25	+ 4 Laps	28	
Ret	32	(Austria) Harald Ertl	Hesketh-Ford	23	Electrical	27	
Ret	21	(France) Jacques Laffite	Williams-Ford	21	Handling	12	
Ret	8	(Brazil) Carlos Pace	Brabham-Ford	17	Engine	6	
Ret	20	(Switzerland) Jo Vonlanthen	Williams-Ford	14	Engine	29	
Ret	10	(West Germany) Hans Joachim Stuck	March-Ford	10	Accident	4	
Ret	17	(France) Jean-Pierre Jarier	Shadow-Matra	10	Injection	14	
Ret	14	(United Kingdom) Bob Evans	BRM	2	Engine	25	
Ret	27	(United States) Mario Andretti	Parnelli-Ford	1	Accident	19	
DNS	30	(Brazil) Wilson Fittipaldi	Fittipaldi-Ford	0	Accident	20	
DNS	28	(United States) Mark Donohue	March-Ford	0	Fatal accident	21	
DNS	6	(United Kingdom) Brian Henton	Lotus-Ford	0	Accident	23	
DNQ	35	(United Kingdom) Tony Trimmer	Maki-Ford				

== Notes ==
- This was the Formula One World Championship debut for Swiss driver Jo Vonlanthen and American driver Brett Lunger.
- This race marked the 25th Grand Prix victory for an Italian driver.
- This was the 25th Grand Prix start for Hesketh.

== Championship standings after the race ==
Drivers' Championship standings

Pos	Driver	Points
1	(Austria) **Niki Lauda***	51.5
2	(Argentina) **Carlos Reutemann***	34
3	(Brazil) Emerson Fittipaldi	33
4	(United Kingdom) James Hunt	28
5	(Brazil) Carlos Pace	24

Constructors' Championship standings

Pos	Constructor	Points
1	(Italy) **Ferrari***	54.5
2	(United Kingdom) **Brabham-Ford***	51 (53)
3	(United Kingdom) **McLaren-Ford***	41
4	(United Kingdom) Hesketh-Ford	28
5	(United Kingdom) Tyrrell-Ford	24

- Note: Only the top five positions are included for both sets of standings. Only the best 6 results from the first 7 races and the best 6 results from the last 7 races counted towards the Championship. Numbers without parentheses are Championship points; numbers in parentheses are total points scored.
- Competitors in bold and marked with an asterisk still had a theoretical chance of becoming World Champion.

Previous race: 1975 German Grand Prix	FIA Formula One World Championship; 1975 season	Next race: 1975 Italian Grand Prix
Previous race: 1974 Austrian Grand Prix	Austrian Grand Prix	Next race: 1976 Austrian Grand Prix
Previous race: 1974 German Grand Prix	European Grand Prix (Designated European Grand Prix)	Next race: 1976 Dutch Grand Prix
