= 1975 Italian Grand Prix =

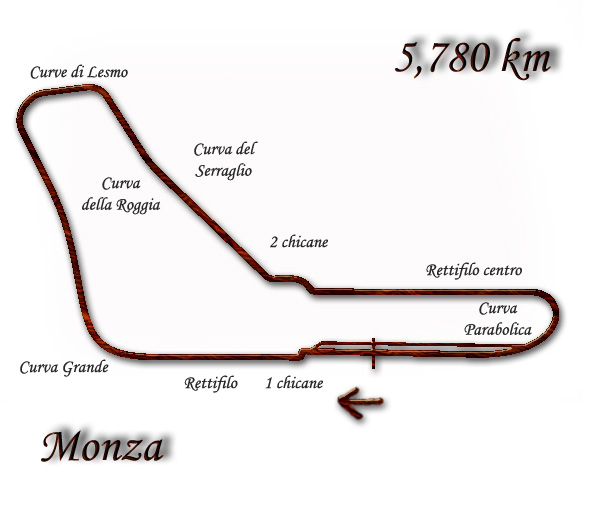

Race details
- Date: 7 September 1975
- Location: Autodromo Nazionale di Monza, Monza
- Course: Permanent racing facility
- Course length: 5.780 km (3.59 miles)
- Distance: 52 laps, 300.56 km (186.68 miles)
- Weather: Dry and sunny

Pole position
Driver	(Austria) Niki Lauda	Ferrari
- Time: 1:32.24

Fastest lap
Driver	(Switzerland) Clay Regazzoni	Ferrari
- Time: 1:33.1 on lap 47

Podium
First	(Switzerland) Clay Regazzoni	Ferrari
Second	(Brazil) Emerson Fittipaldi	McLaren-Ford
Third	(Austria) Niki Lauda	Ferrari

The 1975 Italian Grand Prix was a Formula One motor race held at Monza on 7 September 1975. It was race 13 of 14 in both the 1975 World Championship of Drivers and the 1975 International Cup for Formula One Manufacturers. It was the 45th Italian Grand Prix and the 41st to be held at Monza. The race held over 52 laps of the five kilometre circuit for a race distance of 300 kilometres.

The race was won by Swiss driver Clay Regazzoni in his Ferrari 312T in a glorious day for Scuderia Ferrari. It was Regazzoni's third win, Ferrari's fifth win for the season. Regazzoni took a sixteen-second win over the McLaren M23 of outgoing world champion, Brazilian driver Emerson Fittipaldi. Behind Fittipaldi was the second Ferrari of Austrian driver Niki Lauda who secured enough points to win his first out of three world championships.

== Entries ==
Arturo Merzario was driving the Fittipaldi, replacing Wilson Fittipaldi was still recovering from his crash at the Austrian Grand Prix.

== Qualifying ==
=== Qualifying classification ===
Pos.	No	Driver	Constructor	Time	Gap
1	12	(Austria) Niki Lauda	Ferrari	1:32.24	
2	11	(Switzerland) Clay Regazzoni	Ferrari	1:32.75	+0.51
3	1	(Brazil) Emerson Fittipaldi	McLaren-Ford	1:33.08	+0.84
4	3	(South Africa) Jody Scheckter	Tyrrell-Ford	1:33.27	+1.03
5	2	(West Germany) Jochen Mass	McLaren-Ford	1:33.29	+1.05
6	23	(United Kingdom) Tony Brise	Hill-Ford	1:33.34	+1.10
7	7	(Argentina) Carlos Reutemann	Brabham-Ford	1:33.44	+1.20
8	24	(United Kingdom) James Hunt	Hesketh-Ford	1:33.73	+1.49
9	9	(Italy) Vittorio Brambilla	March-Ford	1:33.90	+1.66
10	8	(Brazil) Carlos Pace	Brabham-Ford	1:34.17	+1.93
11	5	(Sweden) Ronnie Peterson	Lotus-Ford	1:34.22	+1.98
12	4	(France) Patrick Depailler	Tyrrell-Ford	1:34.36	+2.12
13	17	(France) Jean-Pierre Jarier	Shadow-Matra	1:34.61	+2.37
14	16	(United Kingdom) Tom Pryce	Shadow-Ford	1:34.71	+2.47
15	27	(United States) Mario Andretti	Parnelli-Ford	1:34.72	+2.48
16	10	(West Germany) Hans-Joachim Stuck	March-Ford	1:35.29	+3.05
17	34	(Austria) Harald Ertl	Hesketh-Ford	1:35.43	+3.19
18	21	(France) Jacques Laffite	Williams-Ford	1:35.48	+3.24
19	32	(New Zealand) Chris Amon	Ensign-Ford	1:35.56	+3.32
20	14	(United Kingdom) Bob Evans	BRM	1:35.61	+3.37
21	25	(United States) Brett Lunger	Hesketh-Ford	1:36.11	+3.87
22	20	(Italy) Renzo Zorzi	Williams-Ford	1:36.19	+3.95
23	22	(West Germany) Rolf Stommelen	Hill-Ford	1:36.44	+4.20
24	29	(Italy) Lella Lombardi	March-Ford	1:37.06	+4.82
25	6	(United Kingdom) Jim Crawford	Lotus-Ford	1:37.14	+4.90
26	30	(Italy) Arturo Merzario	Fittipaldi-Ford	1:37.33	+5.09
27	31	(Netherlands) Roelof Wunderink	Ensign-Ford	1:37.64	+5.40
28	35	(United Kingdom) Tony Trimmer	Maki-Ford	1:39.44	+7.20

*Positions in red indicate entries that failed to qualify.

== Race summary ==
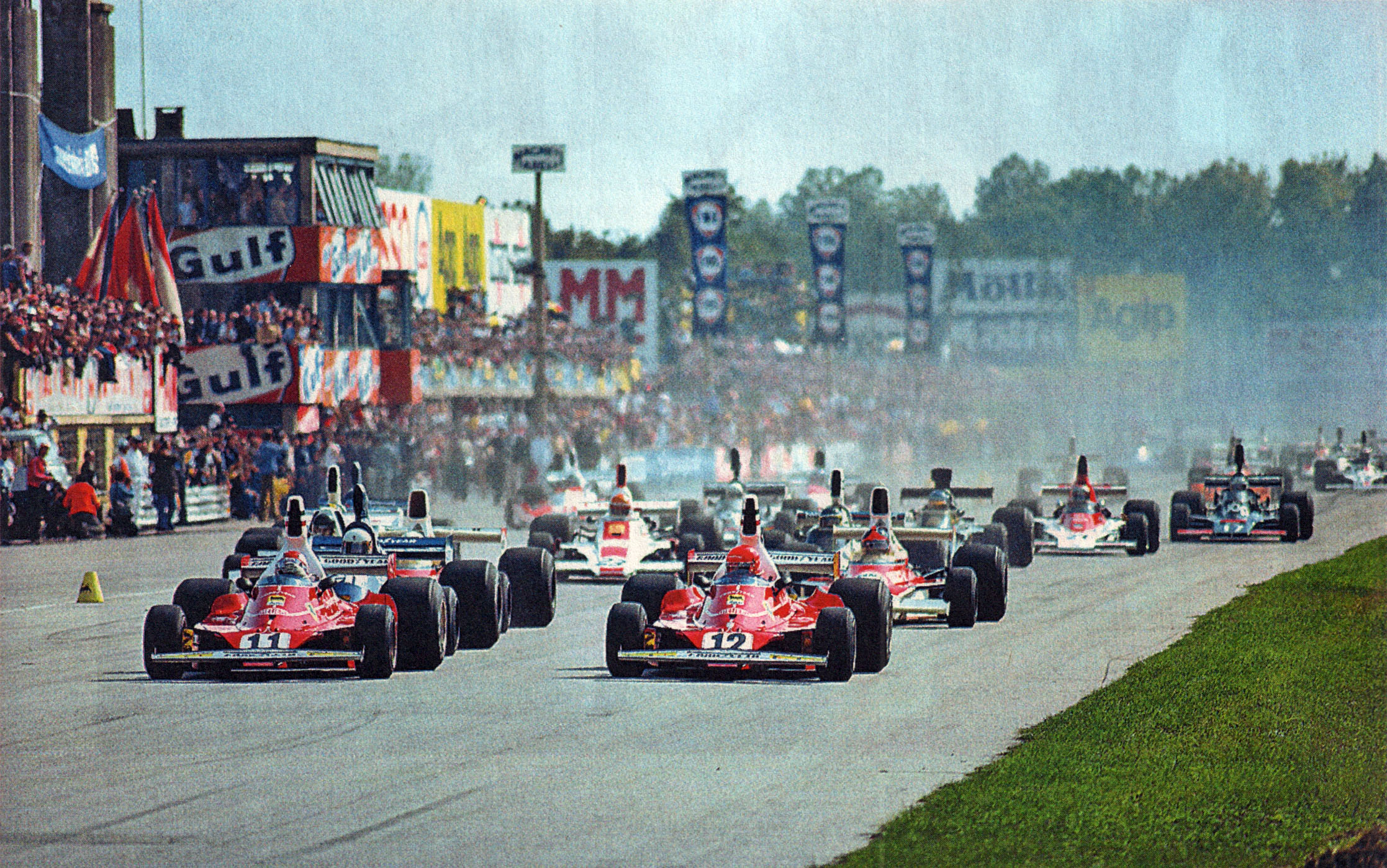
The race start, with the poleman Lauda (n. 12) and Regazzoni (n. 11) in their Ferrari 312Ts

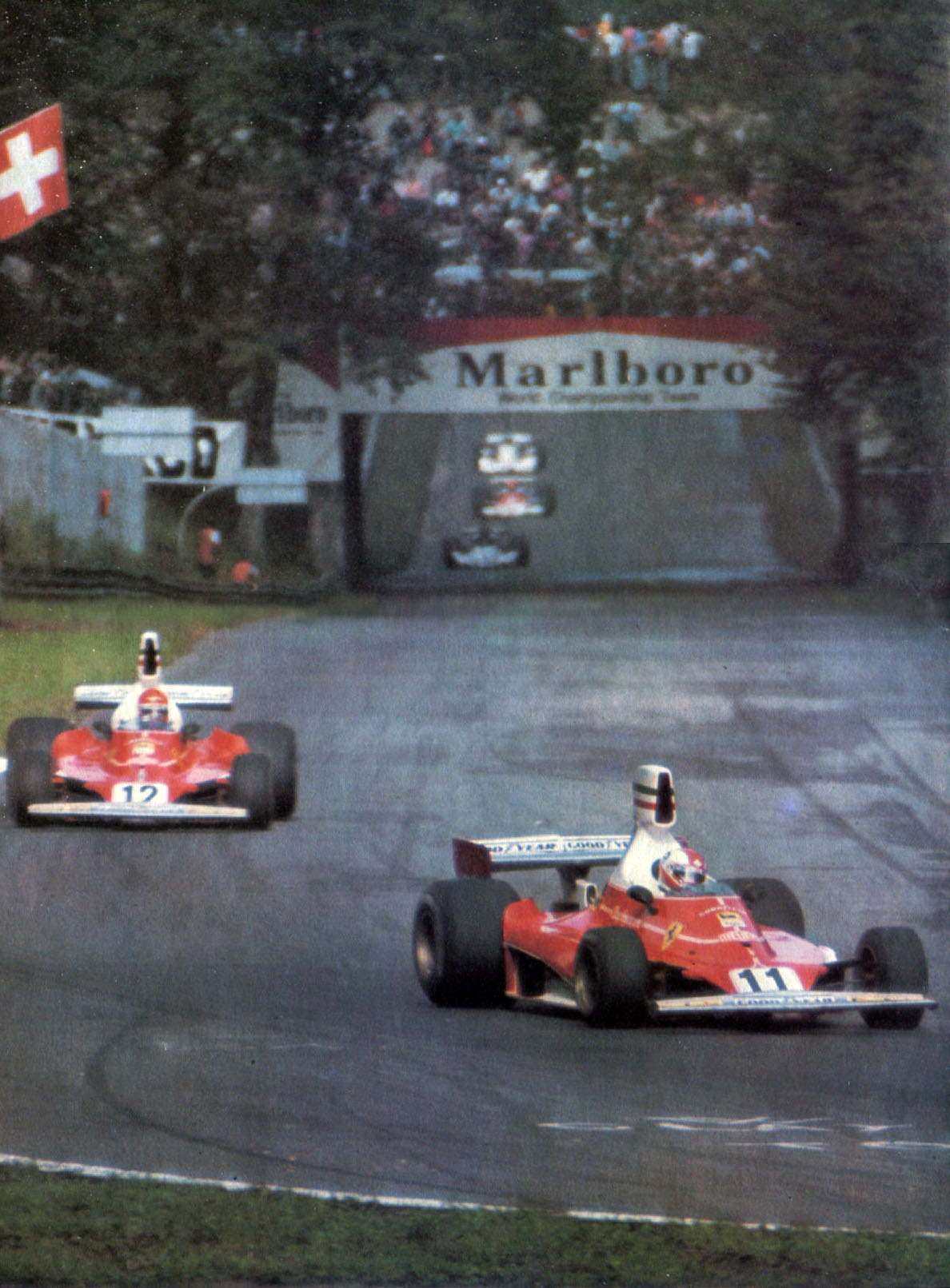
Regazzoni and Lauda at the Mirabello chicane leading the race during the first lap

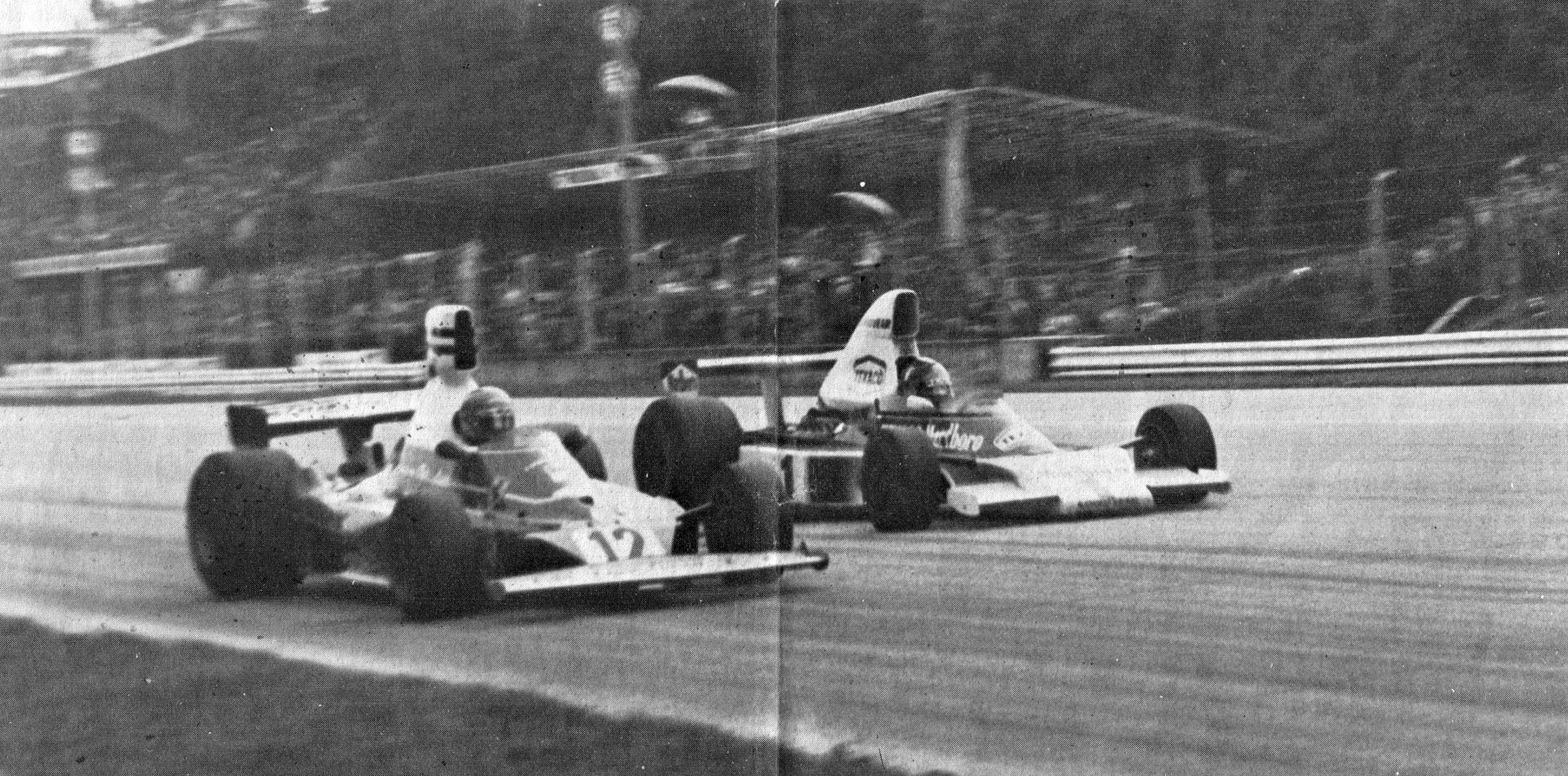
Fittipaldi overtakes Lauda six laps before the end of the race

The Italian supporters were gathered in expectation of Ferrari gaining their first championship in 11 years-on home ground, with many Austrians travelling over the border to support Niki Lauda and were delighted when Ferrari filled both spaces on the front row. Tony Brise delighted his boss Graham Hill by gaining a third-row spot.

Lauda only needed to finish better than 6th to be champion; The only other driver who was mathematically eligible for the championship, Argentine Carlos Reutemann needed to win this race as well as the United States Grand Prix with Lauda out of the points in both races.

On Sunday morning there was a cloudburst and for some time the future of the race was in jeopardy, but the rain dried up with about an hour to go before the start. Clay Regazzoni led from Lauda and Jody Scheckter.

Vittorio Brambilla's clutch burnt out on the first lap, whilst Bob Evans halted with a failed engine plug. There was a chaotic accident at the chicane-Scheckter had to take to the escape road as around him Jochen Mass hit the kerb, damaging his car's suspension. Ronnie Peterson collided with another car, jamming his throttle open. Mario Andretti and Rolf Stommelen retired with accident damage and Brise spun across the chicane. Harald Ertl soared over the top of Hans-Joachim Stuck's car, damaging the uprights.

After six laps, Carlos Pace retired with a broken throttle link, soon joined by Hans-Joachim Stuck and Lella Lombardi. The Ferraris were circulating 1–2 with Clay Regazzoni leading majestically from Niki Lauda. On lap 14, Emerson Fittipaldi passed Carlos Reutemann for third place, and Reutemann's involvement in the championship was effectively over; he finished 4th in the race. Despite the Ferraris being way ahead, Fittipaldi would not give up the chase, carving down a gap of over ten seconds. With just six laps left, he managed to pass Lauda.

Meanwhile, Patrick Depailler had taken James Hunt for fifth only to spin off down the escape road. Hunt, Tom Pryce and Reutemann were duelling, Pryce taking the place when Hunt spun off on lap 27—but ceding it to him after a further ten laps. Harald Ertl was a lap down, but drove so well that Pryce could not overtake him.

Regazzoni took the flag, Fittapaldi was second, Lauda was third and it was enough for Lauda to secure his first world championship. Lauda's 16.5 point lead would be too much for Fittipaldi to bridge at the final round of the championship at the United States Grand Prix. With Regazzoni and Lauda scoring 13 points between them, Ferrari also secured the International Cup for Formula One Manufacturers, their first such win since 1964. Ferrari won the championship for the first time since 1961 in front of their home crowd.

== Race classification ==
Pos	No	Driver	Constructor	Laps	Time/Retired	Grid	Points
1	11	(Switzerland) Clay Regazzoni	Ferrari	52	1:22:42.6	2	9
2	1	(Brazil) Emerson Fittipaldi	McLaren-Ford	52	+ 16.6	3	6
3	12	(Austria) Niki Lauda	Ferrari	52	+ 23.2	1	4
4	7	(Argentina) Carlos Reutemann	Brabham-Ford	52	+ 55.1	7	3
5	24	(United Kingdom) James Hunt	Hesketh-Ford	52	+ 57.1	8	2
6	16	(United Kingdom) Tom Pryce	Shadow-Ford	52	+ 1:15.9	14	1
7	4	(France) Patrick Depailler	Tyrrell-Ford	51	+ 1 Lap	12	
8	3	(South Africa) Jody Scheckter	Tyrrell-Ford	51	+ 1 Lap	4	
9	34	(Austria) Harald Ertl	Hesketh-Ford	51	+ 1 Lap	17	
10	25	(United States) Brett Lunger	Hesketh-Ford	50	+ 2 Laps	21	
11	30	(Italy) Arturo Merzario	Fittipaldi-Ford	48	+ 4 Laps	26	
12	32	(New Zealand) Chris Amon	Ensign-Ford	48	+ 4 Laps	19	
13	6	(United Kingdom) Jim Crawford	Lotus-Ford	46	+ 6 Laps	25	
14	20	(Italy) Renzo Zorzi	Williams-Ford	46	+ 6 Laps	22	
Ret	17	(France) Jean-Pierre Jarier	Shadow-Matra	32	Fuel pump	13	
Ret	29	(Italy) Lella Lombardi	March-Ford	21	Accident	24	
Ret	10	(West Germany) Hans-Joachim Stuck	March-Ford	15	Accident	16	
Ret	21	(France) Jacques Laffite	Williams-Ford	7	Gearbox	18	
Ret	8	(Brazil) Carlos Pace	Brabham-Ford	6	Throttle	10	
Ret	22	(West Germany) Rolf Stommelen	Hill-Ford	3	Accident	23	
Ret	2	(West Germany) Jochen Mass	McLaren-Ford	2	Accident	5	
Ret	5	(Sweden) Ronnie Peterson	Lotus-Ford	1	Engine	11	
Ret	23	(United Kingdom) Tony Brise	Hill-Ford	1	Accident	6	
Ret	27	(United States) Mario Andretti	Parnelli-Ford	1	Accident	15	
Ret	9	(Italy) Vittorio Brambilla	March-Ford	1	Clutch	9	
Ret	14	(United Kingdom) Bob Evans	BRM	0	Electrical	20	
DNQ	31	(Netherlands) Roelof Wunderink	Ensign-Ford				
DNQ	35	(United Kingdom) Tony Trimmer	Maki-Ford				

== Notes ==
- This was the Formula One World Championship debut for Italian driver Renzo Zorzi.
- This race marked the 5th Grand Prix win for a Swiss driver and the 25th podium finish for an Austrian driver.

== Championship standings after the race ==
Drivers' Championship standings

	Pos	Driver	Points
	1	(Austria) **Niki Lauda**	55.5
1	2	(Brazil) Emerson Fittipaldi	39
1	3	(Argentina) Carlos Reutemann	37
	4	(United Kingdom) James Hunt	30
3	5	(Switzerland) Clay Regazzoni	25

Constructors' Championship standings

Pos	Constructor	Points
1	(Italy) **Ferrari***	63.5
2	(United Kingdom) **Brabham-Ford***	54 (56)
3	(United Kingdom) McLaren-Ford	47
4	(United Kingdom) Hesketh-Ford	30
5	(United Kingdom) Tyrrell-Ford	24

- Note: Only the top five positions are included for both sets of standings. Only the best 6 results from the first 7 races and the best 6 results from the last 7 races counted towards the Championship. Numbers without parentheses are Championship points; numbers in parentheses are total points scored.
- **Bold text** indicates the 1975 World Drivers' Champion.
- Competitors in bold and marked with an asterisk still had a theoretical chance of becoming World Champion.

Previous race: 1975 Austrian Grand Prix	FIA Formula One World Championship; 1975 season	Next race: 1975 United States Grand Prix
Previous race: 1974 Italian Grand Prix	Italian Grand Prix	Next race: 1976 Italian Grand Prix
