= Don Nichols =

Formula One team owner

Don Nichols (November 23, 1924 – August 21, 2017) was the founder and former principal of the Shadow CanAm and Formula One racing team.

== Biography ==
Nichols, a U.S. Army combat veteran of World War II and Korea who then served in Military Intelligence, later found success as an entrepreneur in Japan before returning to the U.S. and setting up his own company called Advanced Vehicle Systems in 1968. In 1970 he raced his first CanAm car. He decided to call it Shadow, with the team's logo featuring a cloaked spy. Jackie Oliver won the CanAm title for Shadow in 1974. With major sponsorship from Universal Oil Products (UOP), Nichols expanded his operation and entered F1 at the start of the 1973 season with Oliver and George Follmer driving the new Shadow DN1. In 1974 Nichols retained Peter Revson and Jean Pierre Jarier to drive the new Shadow DN3 which saw Jarier score a 3rd at Monaco. Tragically, Revson was killed during testing at the Kyalami circuit in South Africa when a suspension part failed. Tom Pryce was brought in later that year to replace Revson for the remainder of the season. The 1975 season saw Nichols fielding a two-car Shadow F1 team and with the CanAm series now no longer racing, a single and occasional two car Shadow F5000 team. The season showed tremendous promise with Jarier claiming the team's first pole position at the 1975 Argentine Grand Prix in the all new Shadow DN5 followed by a second pole position and near win by Jarier at 1975 Brazilian Grand Prix before a breakdown while in a commanding lead. Tom Pryce scored Shadow's first F1 win at the non-championship 1975 Race of Champions where Pryce won pole position, set fastest lap and win by over 30 seconds over second place finisher John Watson. Despite numerous successes during the season, original sponsor UOP, notified Nichols late in 1975 that they would be withdrawing their sponsorship. UOP's level of sponsorship was a never adequately replaced. Nichols and Oliver secured a Swiss tobacco company, Tabatip Cigarillos, to sponsor the team on a limited basis for the 1976-77 season with additional sponsorship coming from Franco Ambrosio for the 1977 season. Shadow faced a tragedy similar to the loss of Revson when Tom Pryce was killed during the 1977 South African Grand Prix when a track marshal ran across the track to aid Renzo Zorzi's Shadow that had broken down. Pryce was struck in the helmet by the extinguisher killing him and the marshal instantly. Nichols contracted Alan Jones to replace Pryce. Despite Shadow's difficulties in 1977, the season saw one bright spot when Alan Jones scored Shadow's only grand Prix points victory at the 1977 Austrian Grand Prix. During the 1977 season, the team's decline and frustration with Nichols led most of the team management including designer Tony Southgate to walk out of Shadow to form the Arrows team. Arrows fielded their first F1 car, the FA1 in January, 1978 at the Brazilian Grand Prix that was remarkably similar in design to Shadow's yet to be fielded Shadow DN9. Don Nichols took the case to the British courts, claiming copyright infringement. The Court concurred with Nichols and required that Arrows turnover all the Arrows FA1 cars and associated tooling. Shadow was in further financial decline, and while fielding cars for 1979 and 1980 F1 seasons, the cars were not competitive. In 1981 Nichols sold his assets to the Theodore team of Chinese businessman Teddy Yip. No longer fielding a racing team, Nichols develop plans for various military vehicles under the name of "ShadowBox". These wheeled vehicles were intended to be compact, highly mobile combat vehicles and would be brought to forward areas by helicopter or inside the Bell Boeing V-22 Osprey. He died at the age of 92 on August 21, 2017.
