= Shadow DN3 =

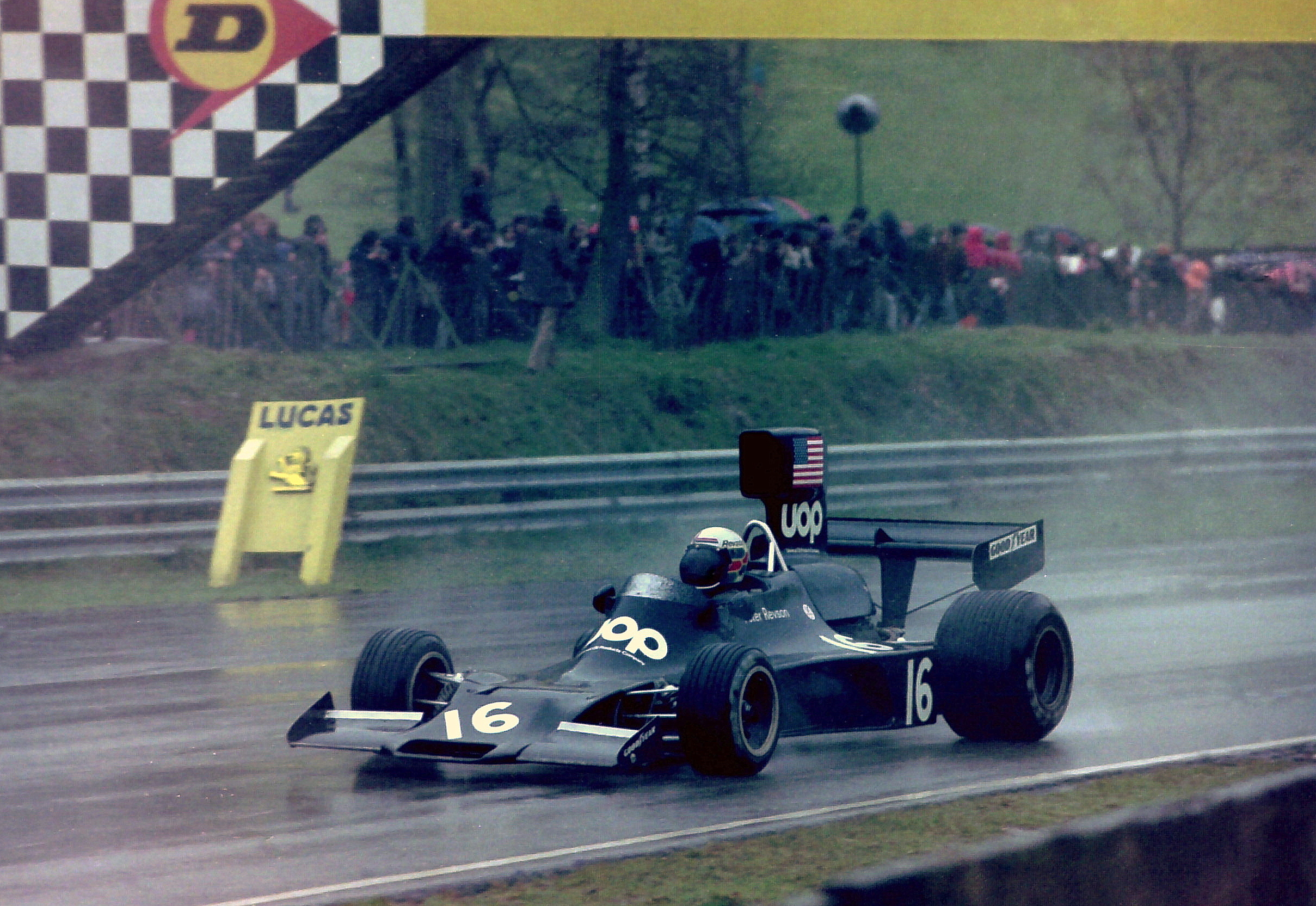
- Peter Revson at the 1974 Race of Champions
- Category: Formula One
- Constructor: Shadow Racing Cars
- Designer: Tony Southgate
- Predecessor: DN1
- Successor: DN5

Technical specifications
- Chassis: Aluminium monocoque
- Axle track: Front: 1,473 mm (58.0 in); Rear: 1,524 mm (60.0 in)
- Wheelbase: 2,667 mm (105.0 in)
- Engine: Cosworth DFV NA
- Transmission: Hewland TL 200 5-speed manual
- Weight: 580 kg (1,280 lb)
- Fuel: UOP
- Tyres: Goodyear

Competition history
- Notable entrants: Shadow Racing Cars
- Notable drivers: (United States) Peter Revson (France) Jean-Pierre Jarier (United Kingdom) Brian Redman (United Kingdom) Tom Pryce
- Debut: 1974 Argentine Grand Prix
Races	Wins	Poles	F/Laps
14	0	0	0
- Constructors' Championships: 0
- Drivers' Championships: 0

The Shadow DN3 was a Formula One car used by the Shadow team during the 1974 Formula One season. It also appeared twice during the early stages of the 1975 Formula One season in an updated DN3B form. Designed by former BRM engineer Tony Southgate, the best finish achieved in a DN3 was Jean-Pierre Jarier's third place at the Monaco Grand Prix.

== Development ==
The Shadow DN3, designed by Tony Southgate, was a development of Southgate's earlier car for the Shadow team, the DN1. One of the problems of the DN1, excessive vibration, was eliminated with stiffening of the DN3 monocoque. The DN3 had a longer wheelbase and was also five kilograms heavier than the previous year's car.

== Racing history ==
For the start of the 1974 Formula One season, the previous year's DN1 was driven by new Shadow driver Jean-Pierre Jarier for the first two races of the year and was retired from both. Jarier drove a DN3 for the remainder of the season. Peter Revson, a race winner for McLaren, had also joined the team and had use of the DN3 from the start of the season. The DN3 showed immediate promise with Revson qualifying it fourth and sixth respectively for the first two races of the year. However, he was killed in testing prior to the South African Grand Prix and Shadow missed the race.

Brian Redman took Revson's place in the team from the Spanish Grand Prix for three races, with Swedish driver Bertil Roos taking over for his home grand prix. Tom Pryce, who had made his Formula One debut earlier in the year with Token Racing, then took over for the remainder of the season. Pryce finished 6th in the German Grand Prix to end the season with one point towards Shadow's total of seven points. The other six points came from Jarier, who, despite the death of Revson, continued as lead driver. In Monaco, Jarier finished third (having qualified sixth) and followed this up with fifth at the Swedish Grand Prix. The team finished in eighth place in the constructor's championship.

Until the new DN5 became available for his use, Pryce used an updated DN3B for the first two races of the following season, without scoring any points.

== Complete Formula One World Championship results ==
(key) (Results in bold indicate pole position; results in italics indicate fastest lap.)

Year	Entrants	Chassis	Engines	Tyres	Drivers	1	2	3	4	5	6	7	8	9	10	11	12	13	14	15	16	Points	WCC
1974	UOP Shadow Racing Cars	DN3	Ford V8	G		ARG	BRA	RSA	ESP	BEL	MON	SWE	NED	FRA	GBR	GER	AUT	ITA	CAN	USA		7	8th
1974	UOP Shadow Racing Cars	DN3	Ford V8	G	Jean-Pierre Jarier				NC	13	3	5	Ret	12	Ret	8	8	Ret	Ret	10		7	8th
1974	UOP Shadow Racing Cars	DN3	Ford V8	G	Peter Revson	Ret	Ret															7	8th
1974	UOP Shadow Racing Cars	DN3	Ford V8	G	Brian Redman				7	Ret	Ret											7	8th
1974	UOP Shadow Racing Cars	DN3	Ford V8	G	Bertil Roos							Ret										7	8th
1974	UOP Shadow Racing Cars	DN3	Ford V8	G	Tom Pryce								Ret	Ret	8	6	Ret	10	Ret	NC		7	8th
1975	UOP Shadow Racing Cars	DN3B	Ford V8	G		ARG	BRA	RSA	ESP	MON	BEL	SWE	NED	FRA	GBR	GER	AUT	ITA	USA			9.5^{1}	6th^{1}
1975	UOP Shadow Racing Cars	DN3B	Ford V8	G	Tom Pryce	12	Ret															9.5^{1}	6th^{1}
1976	Team P R Reilly	DN3	Ford V8	G		BRA	RSA	USW	ESP	BEL	MON	SWE	FRA	GBR	GER	AUT	NED	ITA	CAN	USA	JPN	10^{2}	8th^{2}
1976	Team P R Reilly	DN3	Ford V8	G	Mike Wilds									DNQ								10^{2}	8th^{2}

^1 All points scored in 1975 were with the Shadow DN5.

^2 All points scored in 1976 were with the Shadow DN5B and Shadow DN8.
