= Shadow DN7 =

Formula One racing car

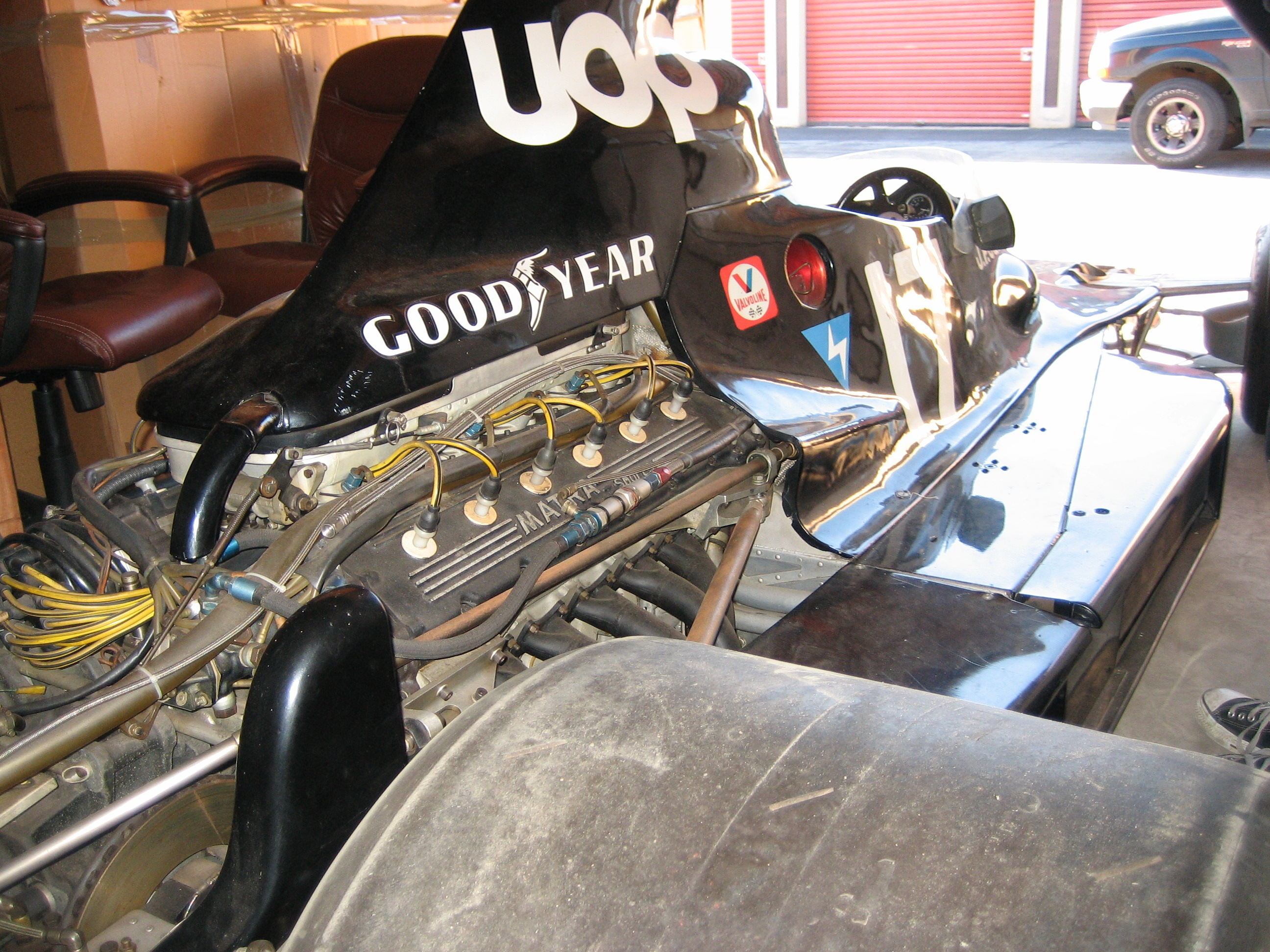
- Category: Formula One
- Constructor: Shadow Racing Cars
- Designer: Tony Southgate
- Predecessor: DN5
- Successor: DN8

Technical specifications
- Chassis: Aluminium monocoque
- Axle track: Front: 1,473 mm (58.0 in); Rear: 1,549 mm (61.0 in)
- Wheelbase: 2,667 mm (105.0 in)
- Engine: Matra MS73 V12 NA
- Transmission: Hewland TL 200 5-speed manual
- Weight: 612 kg (1,349 lb)
- Fuel: UOP
- Tyres: Goodyear

Competition history
- Notable entrants: Shadow Racing Cars
- Notable drivers: (France) Jean-Pierre Jarier
- Debut: 1975 Austrian Grand Prix
Races	Wins	Poles	F/Laps
2	0	0	0
- Constructors' Championships: 0
- Drivers' Championships: 0

The Shadow DN7 was a Formula One car used by the Shadow team in two races late in the 1975 Formula One season. Driven by Jean-Pierre Jarier, it never finished a race.

== Development ==
The Shadow DN7 was designed by Tony Southgate and, in contrast to previous Shadow cars, the powerplant around which the car was designed was a V12. This was the Matra MS73 V12, selected with an eye towards the high speed circuits on the Formula One calendar. The chassis was similar to the DN5, and to allow for the increased consumption of the V12, the fuel tank capacity was increased.

== Racing history ==
The DN7 only participated in two races, in Austria and Italy, driven by Jean-Pierre Jarier who qualified it 14th and 13th on the grid respectively. Mechanical failures meant that it was never classified as a finisher. As Matra decided to supply Ligier with its engines for 1976, Shadow did not continue with the car and Jarier reverted to the DN5 for the final race of the season in the United States.

=== Complete Formula One World Championship results ===
(key) (Results in bold indicate pole position; results in italics indicate fastest lap.)

Year	Entrants	Engines	Tyres	Drivers	1	2	3	4	5	6	7	8	9	10	11	12	13	14	Points	WCC
1975	UOP Shadow Racing Cars	Matra V12	**G**		ARG	BRA	RSA	ESP	MON	BEL	SWE	NED	FRA	GBR	GER	AUT	ITA	USA	**9.5***	**6th**
1975	UOP Shadow Racing Cars	Matra V12	**G**	Jean-Pierre Jarier												Ret	Ret		**9.5***	**6th**

* all points scored in 1975 were with the DN5
