= Shadow DN8 =

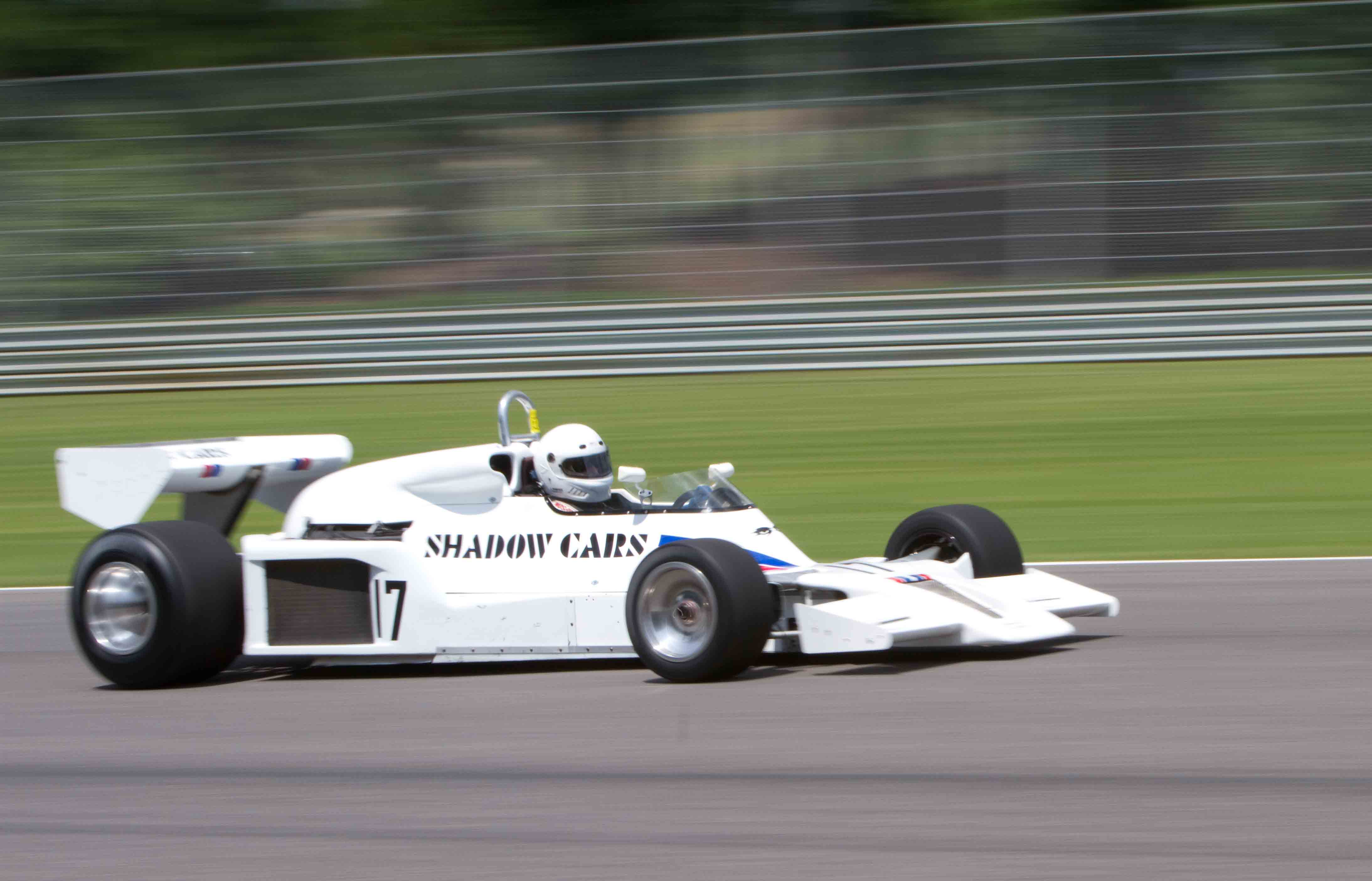
- Category: Formula One
- Constructor: Shadow Racing Cars
- Designers: Tony Southgate; Dave Wass
- Predecessor: DN5B / DN7
- Successor: DN9

Technical specifications
- Chassis: Aluminium monocoque
- Axle track: Front: 1,473 mm (58.0 in); Rear: 1,524 mm (60.0 in)
- Wheelbase: 2,718 mm (107.0 in)
- Engine: Cosworth DFV NA
- Transmission: Hewland TL 200 5-speed manual
- Weight: 620 kg (1,370 lb)
- Fuel: FINA / Valvoline
- Tyres: Goodyear

Competition history
- Notable entrants: Shadow Racing Cars
- Notable drivers: (United Kingdom) Tom Pryce (Australia) Alan Jones (Italy) Riccardo Patrese (Switzerland) Clay Regazzoni (United Kingdom) Jackie Oliver (France) Jean-Pierre Jarier (West Germany) Hans-Joachim Stuck
- Debut: 1976 Dutch Grand Prix
Races	Wins	Poles	F/Laps
25	1	0	0
- Constructors' Championships: 0
- Drivers' Championships: 0

The Shadow DN8 was a Formula One car used by the Shadow team during the 1976, 1977 and 1978 Formula One seasons. Driven by Alan Jones, it won the 1977 Austrian Grand Prix, Shadow's only Grand Prix victory.

== Development ==
The Shadow DN8 was conceptualised by Tony Southgate before he left the team to join Team Lotus. Dave Wass then completed the design work. It featured a low monocoque tub with hip radiators and an oil cooler positioned in the nose (but which would later be moved). Originally intended for the beginning of the 1976 season, a lack of funds following the withdrawal of major sponsor UOP the previous year meant the DN8 did not make its debut until late in the year, at the Dutch Grand Prix. Only one DN8 was produced for 1976, and it would not be until the third race of the following season that two DN8s were available for the drivers.

Southgate returned to the team in the summer of 1977, and this prompted development of the DN8; the chassis was slimmed down with the water and oil coolers reworked for the latter part of the season.

== Racing history ==
After qualifying third in the hands of Tom Pryce, the DN8 finished fourth in its first race of the year, in the 1976 Dutch Grand Prix. After the promise of this first race, it reverted to a midfield runner for the rest of the season. This continued into the early part of the 1977 Formula One season. After Pryce was killed during the South African Grand Prix, the team brought in Alan Jones as a replacement. Jones finished in the points in Monaco and Belgium, and scored a win in the Austrian Grand Prix, from 14th on the grid. He had run second for much of the race and inherited the lead when James Hunt's car developed engine trouble. Jones finished third in Italy and fourth in Canada and Japan for 22 points and 7th in the Drivers Championship standings.

Renzo Zorzi had proved very slow and was replaced with Riccardo Patrese after five races. Patrese dovetailed the second Shadow seat with his Formula Two commitments, and Jackie Oliver, Arturo Merzario and Jean-Pierre Jarier all deputised on occasion. Patrese scored a point with sixth place in the Japanese Grand Prix.

The DN8 remained in service for the early part of the 1978 Formula One season for the team's new drivers, Hans Stuck and Clay Regazzoni. Regazzoni finished fifth at Brazil, but both drivers failed to qualify for the next race in South Africa. The Shadow DN9 was introduced at the following race for Stuck's use, while Regazzoni got his DN9 the race after.

== Complete Formula One World Championship results ==
(key) (Results in bold indicate pole position; results in italics indicate fastest lap.)

Year	Entrant	Engine	Tyres	Drivers	1	2	3	4	5	6	7	8	9	10	11	12	13	14	15	16	17	Points	WCC
1976	Shadow Racing Cars	Cosworth DFV V8	G		BRA	RSA	USW	ESP	BEL	MON	SWE	FRA	GBR	GER	AUT	NED	ITA	CAN	USA	JPN		**10***	8th
1976	Shadow Racing Cars	Cosworth DFV V8	G	Tom Pryce												4	8	11	Ret	Ret		**10***	8th
1977	Shadow Racing Cars	Cosworth DFV V8	G		ARG	BRA	RSA	USW	ESP	MON	BEL	SWE	FRA	GBR	GER	AUT	NED	ITA	USA	CAN	JPN	**23**^	7th
1977	Shadow Racing Cars	Cosworth DFV V8	G	Tom Pryce	NC		Ret															**23**^	7th
1977	Shadow Racing Cars	Cosworth DFV V8	G	Renzo Zorzi			Ret	Ret	Ret													**23**^	7th
1977	Shadow Racing Cars	Cosworth DFV V8	G	Alan Jones				Ret	Ret	6	5	17	Ret	7	Ret	1	Ret	3	Ret	4	4	**23**^	7th
1977	Shadow Racing Cars	Cosworth DFV V8	G	Riccardo Patrese						9	Ret		Ret	Ret	10		13	Ret		10	6	**23**^	7th
1977	Shadow Racing Cars	Cosworth DFV V8	G	Jackie Oliver								9										**23**^	7th
1977	Shadow Racing Cars	Cosworth DFV V8	G	Arturo Merzario												Ret						**23**^	7th
1977	Shadow Racing Cars	Cosworth DFV V8	G	Jean-Pierre Jarier															9			**23**^	7th
1978	Shadow Racing Cars	Cosworth DFV V8	G		ARG	BRA	RSA	USW	MON	BEL	ESP	SWE	FRA	GBR	GER	AUT	NED	ITA	USA	CAN		**6**°	11th
1978	Shadow Racing Cars	Cosworth DFV V8	G	Hans Stuck	17	Ret	DNQ															**6**°	11th
1978	Shadow Racing Cars	Cosworth DFV V8	G	Clay Regazzoni	15	5	DNQ	10														**6**°	11th

* 7 points scored in 1976 was with the DN5B
^ 1 point scored in 1977 was with the DN5B
° 4 points scored in 1978 was with the DN9

== Complete Formula One Non-Championship results ==
(key) (Results in bold indicate pole position; results in italics indicate fastest lap.)

Year	Entrant	Engine	Tyres	Drivers	1
1977	Shadow Racing Cars	Cosworth DFV V8	**G**		ROC
1977	Shadow Racing Cars	Cosworth DFV V8	**G**	Jackie Oliver	5
