= Shadow DN5 =

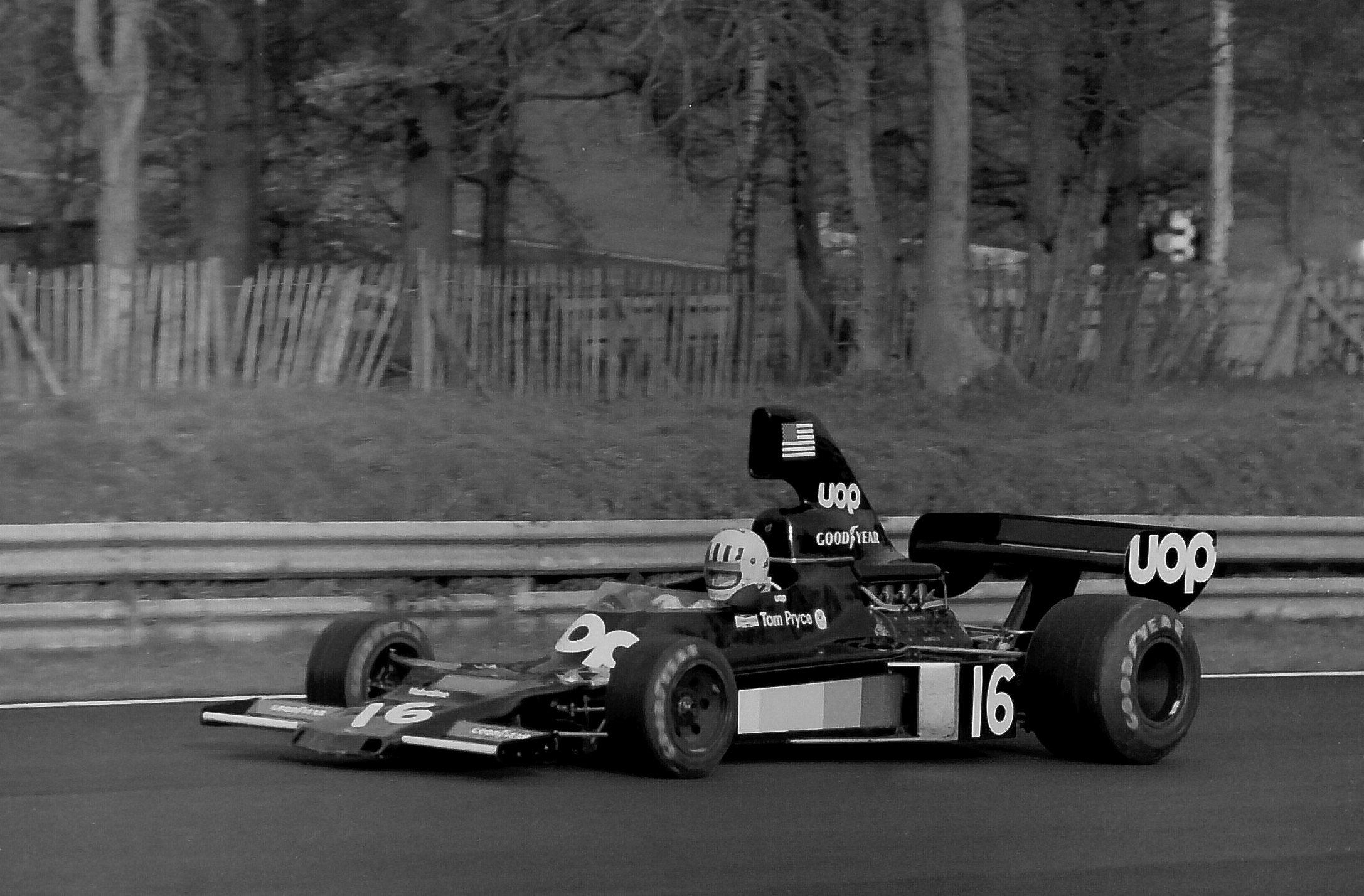
- Tom Pryce at the 1975 Race of Champions
- Category: Formula One
- Constructor: Shadow Racing Cars
- Designer: Tony Southgate
- Predecessor: DN3
- Successor: DN7 / DN8

Technical specifications
- Chassis: Aluminium monocoque
- Axle track: Front: 1,499 mm (59.0 in); Rear: 1,575 mm (62.0 in)
- Wheelbase: 2,667 mm (105.0 in)
- Engine: Cosworth DFV NA
- Transmission: Hewland TL 200 5-speed manual
- Weight: 589 kg (1,299 lb)
- Fuel: UOP
- Tyres: Goodyear

Competition history
- Notable entrants: Shadow Racing Cars
- Notable drivers: (France) Jean-Pierre Jarier (United Kingdom) Tom Pryce
- Debut: 1975 Argentine Grand Prix
Races	Wins	Poles	F/Laps
32	0	3	2
- Constructors' Championships: 0
- Drivers' Championships: 0

The Shadow DN5 was a Formula One car used by the Shadow team during the 1975 Formula One season. Updated to a 'B' specification, it was used through the 1976 Formula One season and for the first two races of the following season. It was qualified on pole position three times, and twice achieved a fastest lap in a race. Its best finish in a race was third (twice), both times driven by Tom Pryce.

== Development ==
The Shadow DN5 was designed by Tony Southgate. A development of the previous year's DN3, the DN5 was more aerodynamically refined and had its weight distribution rearranged. It was updated into a 'B' specification for the following season, prior to which Universal Oil Products, the team's major sponsor, withdrew its financial support.

== Racing history ==
=== 1975 ===
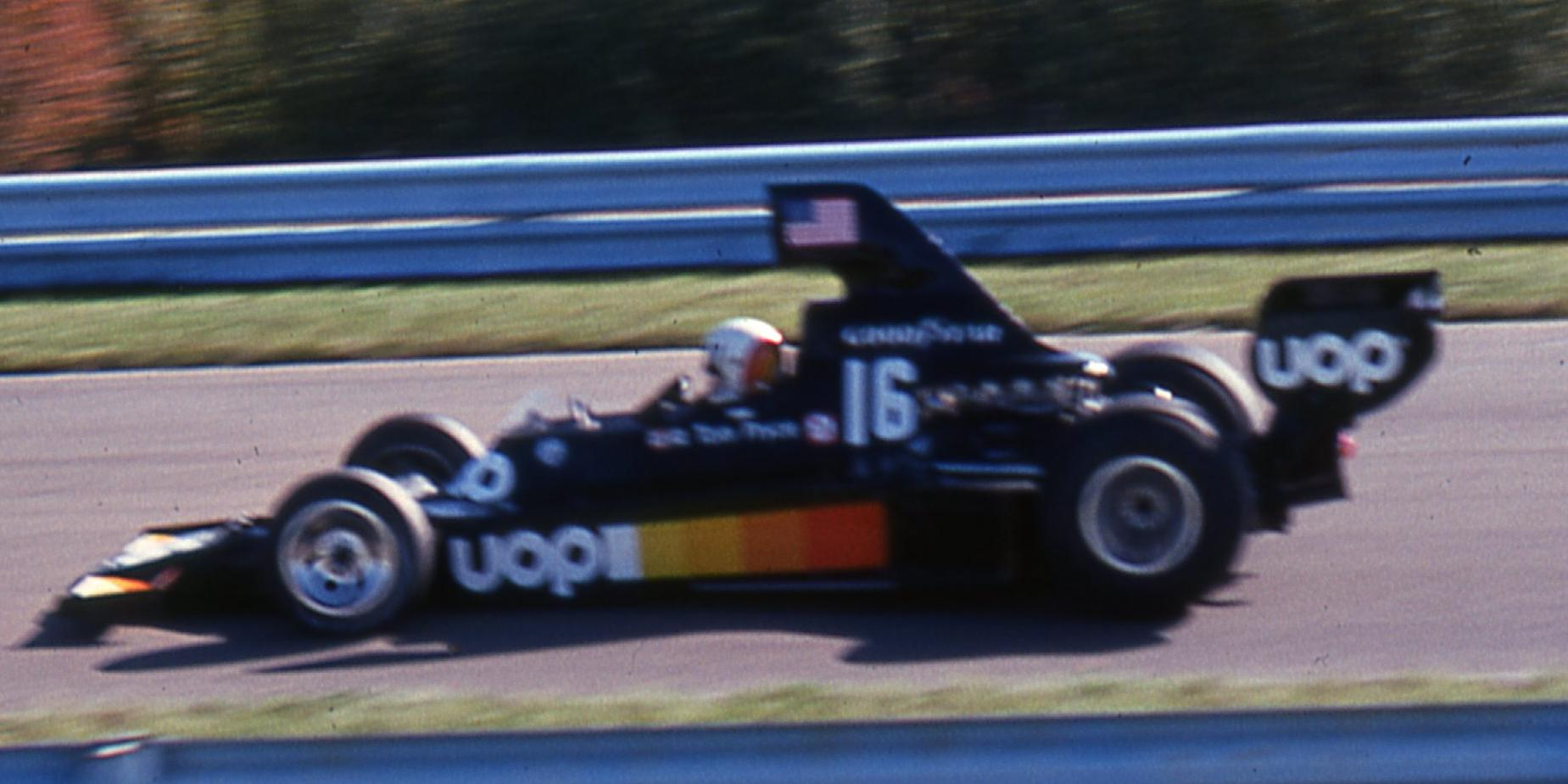
Tom Pryce at the 1975 United States Grand Prix

The DN5 proved to be a fast car, which qualified well several times. In fact, for the first race of the season, the Argentine Grand Prix, Jarier, the team leader qualified the DN5 on pole. However, on race day, the car failed to complete the warmup lap due to a crown wheel and pinion failure in the gearbox. Jarier took pole again for the following Brazilian Grand Prix, but retired on lap 32, having led for most of the race (and achieving fastest lap). Ultimately, the poor reliability of the car (and some driver induced errors) meant that Jarier finished only two races during the season. The best of these was fourth at the Spanish Grand Prix, for which he was awarded half points due to the race being stopped as a result of a bad crash. He also switched to a Matra V12 powered DN7 for two races towards the end of the season.

An updated version of the previous year's DN3 was driven by Tom Pryce for the first two races of the year before he switched to the DN5. Pryce fared better than Jarier with the DN5 and managed several finishes; he finished sixth three times, finished fourth in Germany and third in Austria. He had qualified on pole for the British Grand Prix, but like Jarier in Brazil, retired from the lead in the race itself.

=== 1976 ===
The DN5 was updated into a 'B' specification for the 1976 Formula One season. However, while the reliability of the DN5B was much improved from its parent, it was not as competitive, at least during the latter part of the year. Jarier qualified his DN5B third on the grid in the Brazilian Grand Prix and ran second for much of the race before crashing. This left Pryce to take third place, the best result for the team during the year. While both drivers regularly finished in the top ten, there was only one other finish in the points for the DN5B, this being Pryce's fourth place in the British Grand Prix. From the Dutch Grand Prix, Pryce switched to Shadow's new car, the Shadow DN8, while Jarier continued with the old car.

=== 1977 ===
The DN5B continued into the 1977 Formula One season, driven by Shadow's new driver, Renzo Zorzi, in the two first races of the year. While he retired from the Argentine Grand Prix, Zorzi scored an attrition assisted sixth place in the last race for the DN5B, the Brazilian Grand Prix.

=== Later use ===
The DN5 is still used in historic racing, having had some success in the Historic Grand Prix of Monaco, and the FIA Historic F1 Championship, where it won the 2017 title.

== Complete Formula One World Championship results ==
(key) (Results in bold indicate pole position; results in italics indicate fastest lap.)

Year	Entrant(s)	Chassis	Engine(s)	Tyres	Drivers	1	2	3	4	5	6	7	8	9	10	11	12	13	14	15	16	17	Points	WCC
1975	UOP Shadow Racing Cars	DN5	Ford V8	G		ARG	BRA	RSA	ESP	MON	BEL	SWE	NED	FRA	GBR	GER	AUT	ITA	USA				**9.5**	6th
1975	UOP Shadow Racing Cars	DN5	Ford V8	G	Jean-Pierre Jarier	**DNS**	**Ret**	Ret	4	Ret	Ret	Ret	Ret	8	Ret	Ret			Ret				**9.5**	6th
1975	UOP Shadow Racing Cars	DN5	Ford V8	G	Tom Pryce			9	Ret	Ret	6	Ret	6	Ret	**Ret**	4	3	6	NC				**9.5**	6th
1976	Shadow Racing Cars	DN5B	Ford V8	G		BRA	RSA	USW	ESP	BEL	MON	SWE	FRA	GBR	GER	AUT	NED	ITA	CAN	USA	JPN		**10***	8th
1976	Shadow Racing Cars	DN5B	Ford V8	G	Jean-Pierre Jarier	Ret	Ret	7	Ret	9	8	12	12	9	11	Ret	10	19	18	10	10		**10***	8th
1976	Shadow Racing Cars	DN5B	Ford V8	G	Tom Pryce	3	7	Ret	8	10	7	9	8	4	8	Ret							**10***	8th
1977	Shadow Racing Cars	DN5B	Ford V8	G		ARG	BRA	RSA	USW	ESP	MON	BEL	SWE	FRA	GBR	GER	AUT	NED	ITA	USA	CAN	JPN	**23**°	7th
1977	Shadow Racing Cars	DN5B	Ford V8	G	Renzo Zorzi	Ret	6																**23**°	7th
1977	Shadow Racing Cars	DN5B	Ford V8	G	Tom Pryce		Ret																**23**°	7th

* 3 points scored in 1976 were with the DN8
° 22 points scored in 1977 were with the DN8
