= Renzo Zorzi =

Italian racing driver (1946–2015)

- Born: 12 December 1946; Ziano di Fiemme, Italy
- Died: 15 May 2015 (aged 68); Magenta, Italy

Formula One World Championship career
- Nationality: (Italy) Italian
- Active years: 1975–1977
- Team(s): Williams, Wolf–Williams, Shadow
- Entries: 7
- Championships: 0
- Wins: 0
- Podiums: 0
- Career points: 1
- Pole positions: 0
- Fastest laps: 0
- First entry: 1975 Italian Grand Prix
- Last entry: 1977 Spanish Grand Prix

Renzo Zorzi (12 December 1946 – 15 May 2015) was a racing driver from Italy who participated in seven Formula One Grands Prix between 1975 and 1977, for the Williams and Shadow teams. He began in Formula Three while working with Pirelli before progressing to Formula One. He later raced in sports cars before returning to work with Pirelli, running a driving school. He is the only driver from the province of Trentino to have competed in Formula One.

== Career ==
=== Formula Three ===
The son of a miner, Zorzi was born in Ziano di Fiemme, Trentino, near the Austrian border. He became an engineer with Pirelli, and began his motor racing career in 1972, driving a Tecno for Scuderia Mirabella in Italian Formula Three. He debuted at Monza on 3 September, where he failed to qualify for the final.

Zorzi competed more regularly the following year, initially with a Brabham BT38C, and then with a Quasar, finishing 12th at Vallelunga, before finishing 13th at Casale with the Brabham. He then managed 10th at Misano driving a Branca, before his best result of the season, sixth place at Varano in a Brabham BT35.

In 1974, Zorzi campaigned a GRD 374 for Scuderia Mirabella, with Giorgio Francia as his team-mate. With this car he began to achieve better results, starting with sixth place at Casale and fifth at Monza beating Francia, before fifth place at Monaco driving a March 743. Back in the GRD, he managed 13th at the Nürburgring in a race won by Francia, followed by fifth again at Casale and sixth at Monza. He finished tenth in the championship.

For 1975, Zorzi helped to develop a Formula Three engine for Lancia, built by the Repetto company. This was fitted to his GRD 374, replacing the original Ford engine, and with the GRD-Lancia he finished third at Varano, his first podium finish. As he was still without a win in the Italian category, it was a surprise when he won the European Formula Three Monaco Grand Prix in May, having qualified second to Larry Perkins and won heat two by eleven seconds. In a chaotic final, he gained two places when Tony Brise and Alex Ribeiro collided in front of him, and finished second on the track, 21 seconds behind Conny Andersson. When Andersson was penalised a minute for a jump start, Zorzi inherited the victory, just 0.89 seconds ahead of the Safir of Patrick Nève.

Back in the Italian championship, Zorzi subsequently finished seventh at Vallelunga, and sixth at Mugello. In the European category, he achieved two sixth places at the Nürburgring and the Ring Djursland in Denmark. But his Monaco success had provided the impetus for a step towards Formula One before the end of the 1975 season.

=== Formula One: Williams ===
Later in 1975, Zorzi arranged a deal with Frank Williams to drive one of his cars at the Italian Grand Prix. The Williams team was struggling at this time, and were using pay drivers to race the ageing FW03 which had failed to score any points so far that season. He qualified the car 22nd of the 28 entrants, just 0.71 seconds slower than his team-mate Jacques Laffite in the newer FW04. Running as high as 12th in the race, he was delayed by a puncture and finished 14th and last, six laps adrift of winner Clay Regazzoni. This was the last race for the car before Williams sold it to Loris Kessel.

The arrangement continued at the first race of 1976, the Brazilian Grand Prix, although the team was now 60% owned by Walter Wolf and renamed Wolf-Williams. Zorzi drove the FW04 while new team-mate Jacky Ickx drove the new FW05. Zorzi qualified 17th of the 22 entrants, outqualifying 19th placed Ickx. He finished ninth of 14 classified finishers, just 2.44 seconds behind Ickx. However, his sponsorship money had run out and his time with Williams came to an end as he was replaced by Michel Leclère. For the rest of 1976, Zorzi returned to Formula Three with the Modus team, and also raced sports cars. Among other results in the 1976 World Championship for Makes, he finished eighth in the 1976 6 Hours of Vallelunga in a Jolly Club-entered Lancia Stratos.

=== 1977: Shadow ===
Zorzi returned to Formula One in 1977 with the Shadow team as team-mate to the highly-rated Welsh driver Tom Pryce, backed by their Italian sponsor Franco Ambrosio. Ambrosio demanded an Italian driver as part of the agreement for his financial support, and Zorzi was chosen for this reason rather than through the choice of the team. At the first race in Argentina, driving the team's older DN5B, he qualified last of the 21 entrants, and climbed to 18th at the start before retiring on lap three with a gearbox failure.

At the next race in Brazil, Zorzi qualified 18th and in a race of attrition, finished sixth of the seven finishers, winning his only World Championship point in only his fourth Grand Prix. Pryce had been running second in the race behind eventual winner Carlos Reutemann, when his engine failed with seven laps remaining.

However, tragedy struck in the following race in South Africa. Driving the team's new DN8, Zorzi qualified 20th, and was running near the back of the field when he pulled off the track with a fuel leak caused by a broken metering unit. As he tried to detach the oxygen pipe from his helmet before getting out of the car, a fire erupted at the rear. Zorzi quickly got out of the car and activated his on-board fire extinguisher which doused the flames. Several seconds later, although the fire was out, two marshals ran across the track with hand-held fire extinguishers. Crossing the track just beyond a blind brow, the first marshal narrowly avoided the passing cars but the second marshal, Frederick Jansen Van Vuuren, was struck and killed by the car of Zorzi's teammate Pryce. Van Vuuren's fire extinguisher struck Pryce on his helmet, causing fatal head and neck injuries.

The British press and some in the Shadow team blamed Zorzi for the tragedy, suggesting his agitation in the cockpit trying to remove his oxygen pipe prompted the marshals to cross the track, believing Zorzi needed assistance. Pryce was replaced by future World Champion Alan Jones, who outperformed Zorzi at the following two races. At Long Beach, Zorzi qualified 20th and retired with a gearbox failure, and in Spain he qualified 24th and retired with an engine failure.

When Zorzi arrived in Monaco for the 1977 Monaco Grand Prix, he found that his car had Riccardo Patrese's name on it, and that he had been replaced by Patrese, another Ambrosio protege, without being informed.

=== Later career ===
After his Formula One career was over, Zorzi occasionally raced in sports cars, mainly in Italy. He was a regular entrant to the 1000 km Monza race, winning it in 1979 in a Lola T286 with Marco Capoferri. The following year, he qualified on pole position in the Capoferri-Ford he shared with Claudio Francisci, also claiming fastest lap before the car retired. His last appearance in the event came in 1985, when the Porsche 956 he shared with Oscar Larrauri and Massimo Sigala for Brun Motorsport finished sixth.

Zorzi also had a one-off appearance in the Aurora AFX F1 championship in 1980, driving an Arrows A1 for Charles Clowes Racing in the Monza Lottery GP. He qualified eighth but retired after a collision.

After retiring from racing, Zorzi returned to work for Pirelli, running a driving school for the company at Binetto in southern Italy.

== Death ==
Zorzi died on 15 May 2015, aged 68, in hospital in Magenta, Lombardy after a long illness. His funeral took place on 18 May in his birthplace of Ziano. He was survived by a son, Andrea.

== Racing record ==
=== Complete Formula One World Championship results ===
(key)

Year	Entrant	Chassis	Engine	1	2	3	4	5	6	7	8	9	10	11	12	13	14	15	16	17	WDC	Pts
1975	Frank Williams Racing Cars	Williams FW03	Ford Cosworth DFV 3.0 V8	ARG	BRA	RSA	ESP	MON	BEL	SWE	NED	FRA	GBR	GER	AUT	ITA; 14	USA				NC	0
1976	Frank Williams Racing Cars	Wolf–Williams FW04	Ford Cosworth DFV 3.0 V8	BRA; 9	RSA	USW	ESP	BEL	MON	SWE	FRA	GBR	GER	AUT	NED	ITA	CAN	USA	JPN		NC	0
1977	Shadow Racing Team	Shadow DN5B	Ford Cosworth DFV 3.0 V8	ARG; Ret	BRA; 6																19th	1
1977	Shadow Racing Team	Shadow DN8	Ford Cosworth DFV 3.0 V8			RSA; Ret	USW; Ret	ESP; Ret	MON	BEL	SWE	FRA	GBR	GER	AUT	NED	ITA	USA	CAN	JPN	19th	1

=== Complete British Formula One Championship results ===
(key)

Year	Entrant	Chassis	Engine	1	2	3	4	5	6	7	8	9	10	11	12	Pos.	Pts
1980	Charles Clowes Racing	Arrows A1	Ford Cosworth DFV 3.0 V8	OUL	BRH	SIL	MAL	THR	MNZ; Ret	MAL	SNE	BRH	THR	OUL	SIL	NC	0
