= Shadow DN1 =

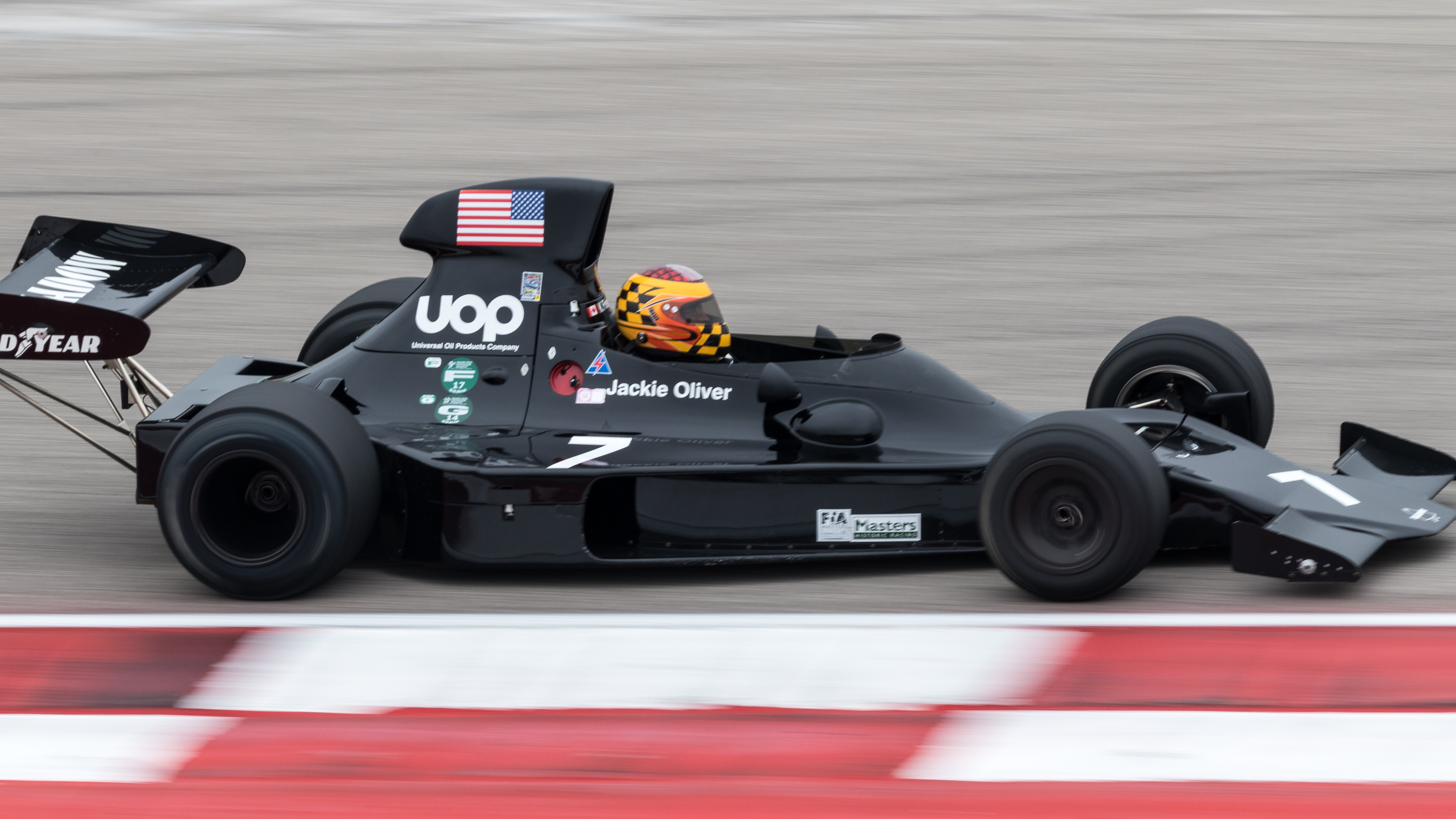
- The DN1 at the 2017 FIA Masters Historic Formula One Championship at the Circuit of the Americas
- Category: Formula One
- Constructor: Shadow Racing Cars
- Designer: Tony Southgate
- Successor: DN3

Technical specifications
- Chassis: Aluminium monocoque
- Axle track: Front: 1,473 mm (58.0 in); Rear: 1,524 mm (60.0 in)
- Wheelbase: 2,540 mm (100 in)
- Engine: Cosworth DFV, NA
- Transmission: Hewland TL 200 5-speed manual
- Weight: 575 kg (1,268 lb)
- Fuel: UOP
- Tyres: Goodyear

Competition history
- Notable entrants: Shadow Racing Cars; Embassy Hill
- Notable drivers: (United Kingdom) Jackie Oliver (United States) George Follmer (United Kingdom) Brian Redman (United Kingdom) Graham Hill (France) Jean-Pierre Jarier
- Debut: 1973 South African Grand Prix
- Last event: 1974 Brazilian Grand Prix
Races	Wins	Podiums	Poles	F/Laps
15	0	2	0	0
- Unless otherwise stated, all data refer to Formula One World Championship Grands Prix only.

The Shadow DN1 was a Formula One car used by the Shadow team during the 1973 Formula One season and the early stages of the following season. The car was the first Formula One car for Shadow, which had previously participated in the CanAm Sportscar Series. It was designed by former BRM engineer Tony Southgate. The DN1 was also driven by Graham Hill for his privateer team, Embassy Hill.

== Development ==
The Shadow DN1 was to be the first car for Don Nichols' Formula One team, newly established to participate in the 1973 Formula One season. The team did have some racing expertise, having participated in the CanAm Sportscar Series and also bringing in experienced British racing personnel including engineer Tony Southgate and manager Alan Rees. Designed by Southgate, the DN1 used an aluminum monocoque and double wishbone suspension, and was powered by a 2993 cubic centimeters (182.6 cu in) Ford Cosworth DFV engine. Having recently only worked with the smooth-revving BRM V12 engines, Southgate did not allow sufficient damping and reinforcement to compensate for the vibration of the flat-plane V8 DFV. This caused some severe reliability issues for the cars, particularly at the start of the season.

The Shadow works team cars were finished in an all black scheme, with sponsorship from UOP.

== Racing history ==
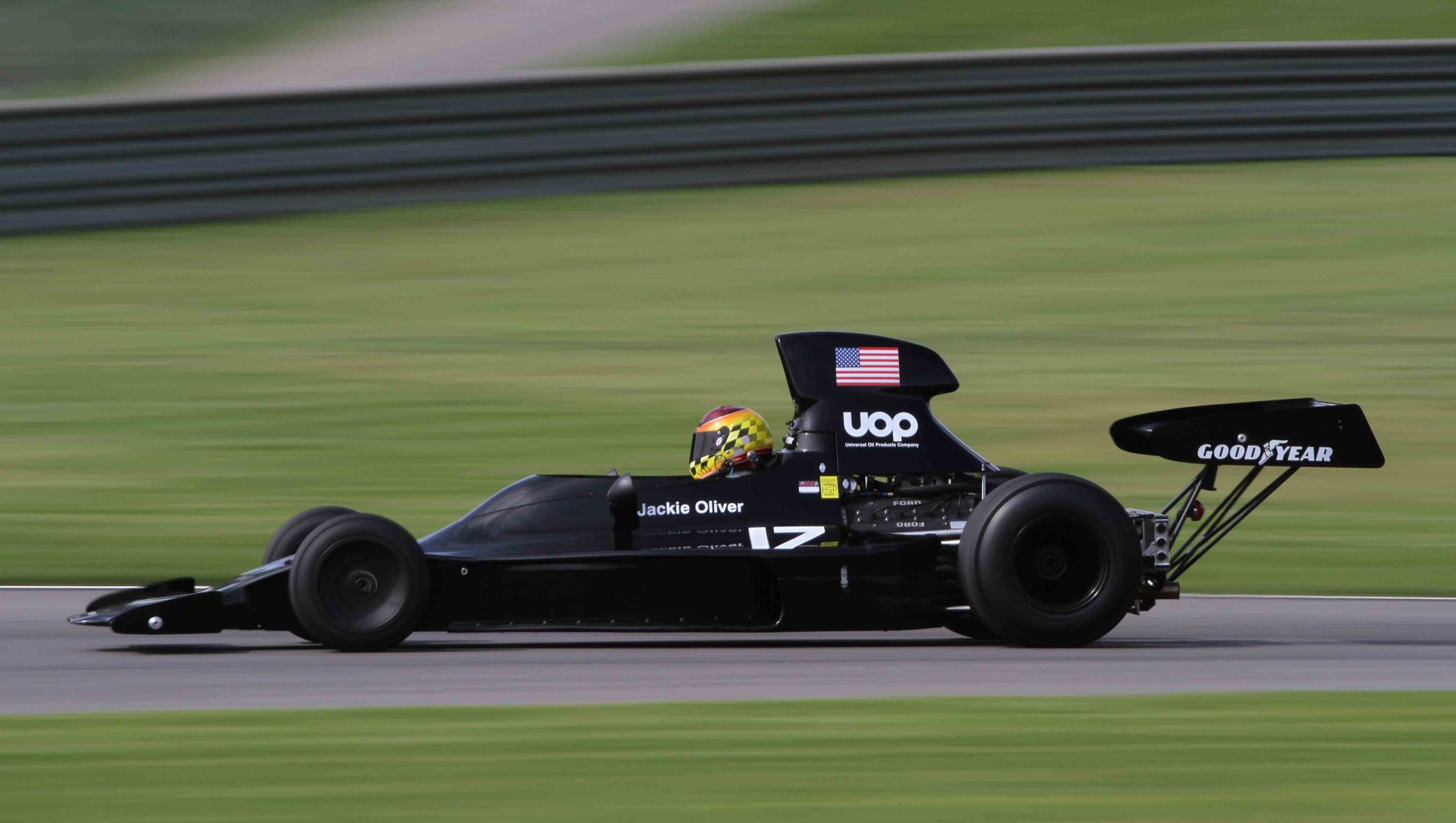
Shadow DN1 at Barber Motorsport park

Shadow missed the first two races of the 1973 season, but the team arrived in South Africa for the South African Grand Prix with two entries for its drivers. The lead driver for Shadow was the experienced former BRM and Team Lotus driver Jackie Oliver while driving the other car was George Follmer who, although a novice in Formula One, had extensive experience in sportscar racing. Follmer finished sixth in South Africa, and followed this performance up with third in the following race. Oliver took another third place for the team in the penultimate race of the year in Canada. Shadow entered a third car for Brian Redman for the final race of the year but he failed to add to the team's points tally for the year. Shadow finished the year with nine points and eighth place in the constructor's championship.

In 1974, the DN1 was superseded by the Shadow DN3 although new Shadow driver Jean-Pierre Jarier had to drive the DN1 for his first two races of the year, retiring from both.

=== Embassy Hill ===
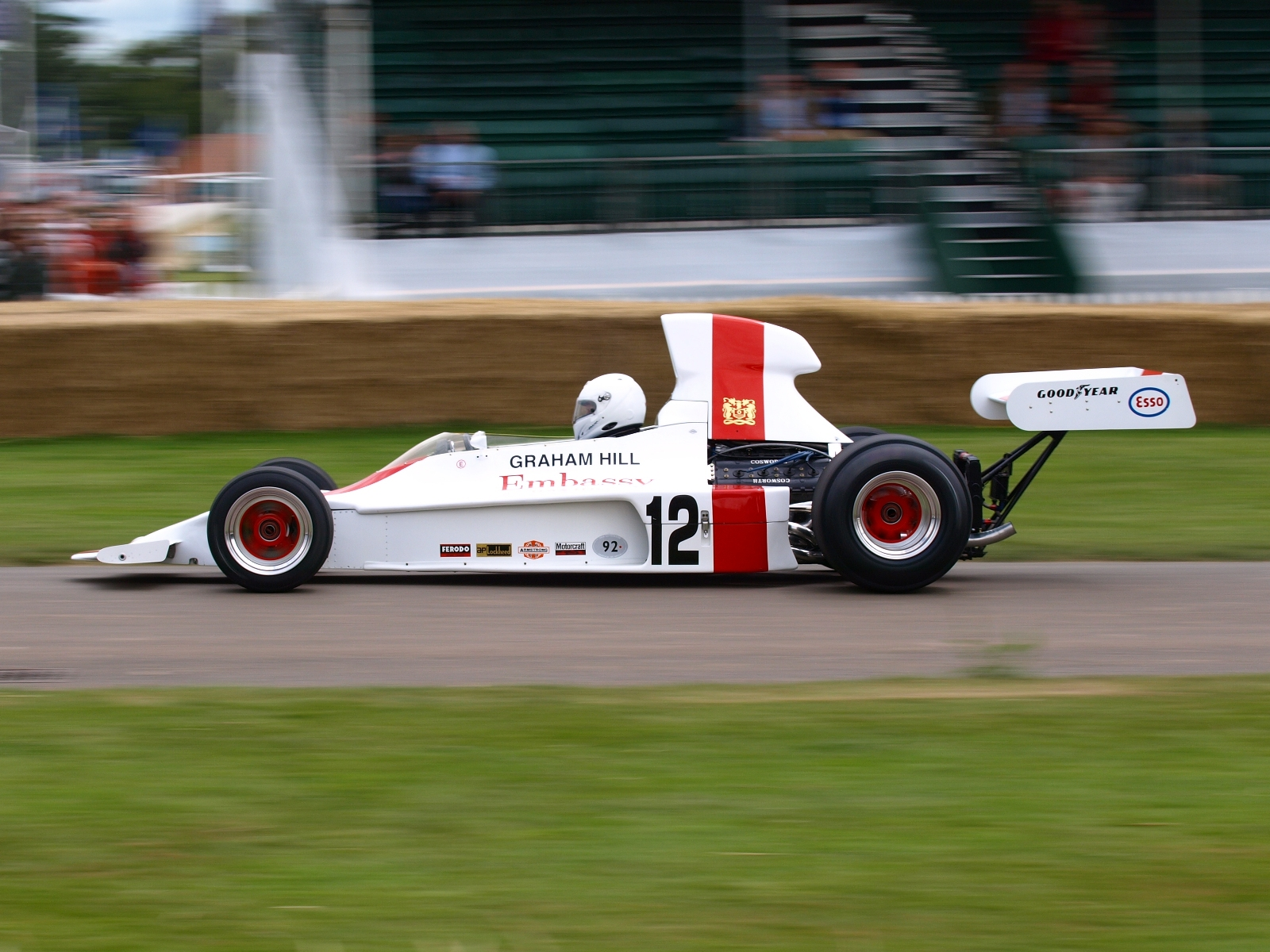
The Embassy Hill Shadow DN1 from 1973 being demonstrated at the 2008 Goodwood Festival of Speed.

Graham Hill also purchased a Shadow DN1 during the 1973 season for his newly established team, Embassy Racing. Driving the team's only entry, which ran in a largely white scheme with a red cordon imitating the sponsor's cigarette packets, Hill failed to score any points with the DN1. His best finish was ninth at the 1973 Belgian Grand Prix. Embassy Hill switched to Lolas for the following season.

== Complete Formula One World Championship results ==
(key) (Results in bold indicate pole position; results in italics indicate fastest lap.)

Year	Entrant	Engine	Tyres	Drivers	1	2	3	4	5	6	7	8	9	10	11	12	13	14	15	Points	WCC
1973	UOP Shadow Racing Cars	Ford V8	G		ARG	BRA	RSA	ESP	BEL	MON	SWE	FRA	GBR	NED	GER	AUT	ITA	CAN	USA	**9**	8th
1973	UOP Shadow Racing Cars	Ford V8	G	Jackie Oliver			Ret	Ret	Ret	10	Ret	Ret	Ret	Ret	8	Ret	11	3	15	**9**	8th
1973	UOP Shadow Racing Cars	Ford V8	G	George Follmer			6	3	Ret	DNS	14	Ret	Ret	10	Ret	Ret	10	17	14	**9**	8th
1973	UOP Shadow Racing Cars	Ford V8	G	Brian Redman															DSQ	**9**	8th
1973	Embassy Racing	Ford V8	G	Graham Hill				Ret	9	Ret	Ret	10	Ret	NC	13	Ret	14	16	13	**9**	8th
1974	UOP Shadow Racing Cars	Ford V8	G		ARG	BRA	RSA	ESP	BEL	MON	SWE	NED	FRA	GBR	GER	AUT	ITA	CAN	USA	**7***	8th
1974	UOP Shadow Racing Cars	Ford V8	G	Jean-Pierre Jarier	Ret	Ret														**7***	8th

* All points scored in 1974 were with Shadow DN3 cars
