= Shadow Racing Cars =

Sports organization

Shadow
- Full name: Shadow Racing Cars Inc.
- Base: Northampton, United Kingdom
- Founder(s): (United States) Don Nichols
- Noted staff: (United Kingdom) Jackie Oliver (United Kingdom) Alan Rees (Mexico) Jo Ramírez
- Noted drivers: (France) Jean-Pierre Jarier (Australia) Alan Jones (United Kingdom) Tom Pryce (United States) Peter Revson (United States) George Follmer

Formula One World Championship career
- First entry: 1973 South African Grand Prix
- Races entered: 112
- Constructors' Championships: 0
- Drivers' Championships: 0
- Race victories: 1
- Pole positions: 3
- Fastest laps: 2
- Final entry: 1980 French Grand Prix

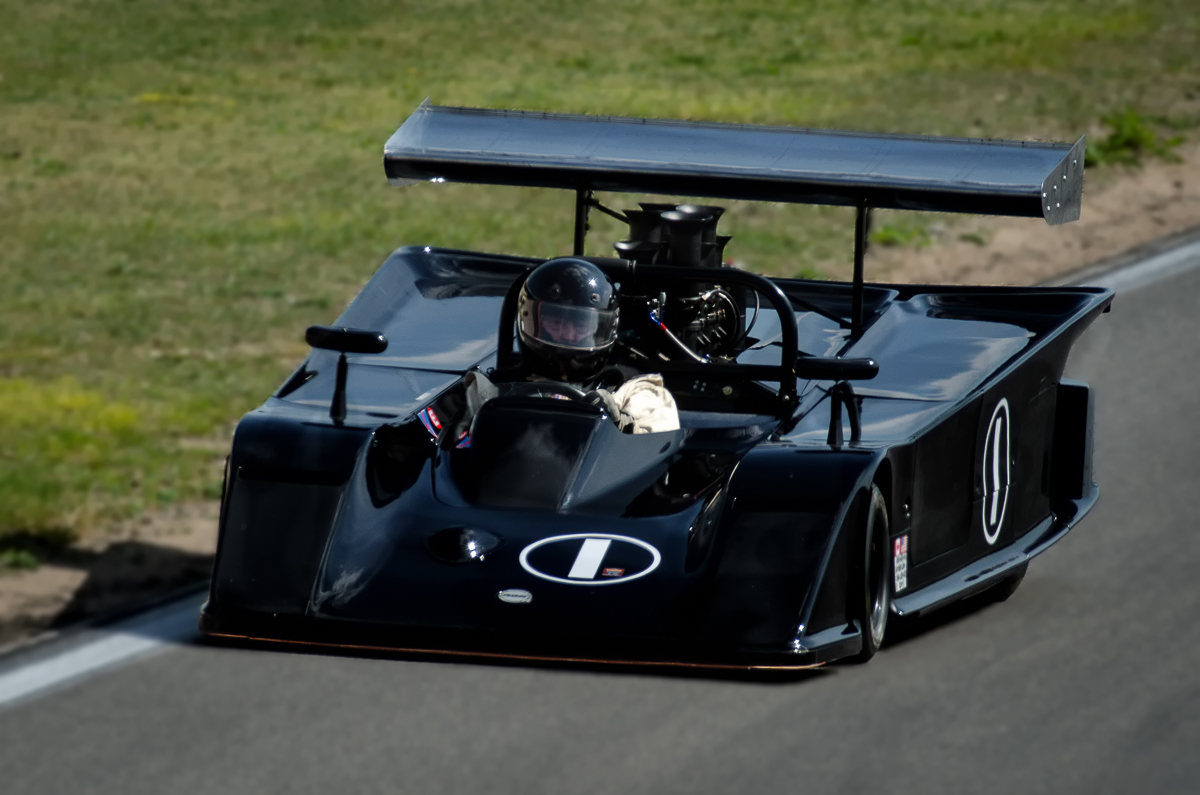
A Shadow Mk.I Can-Am car

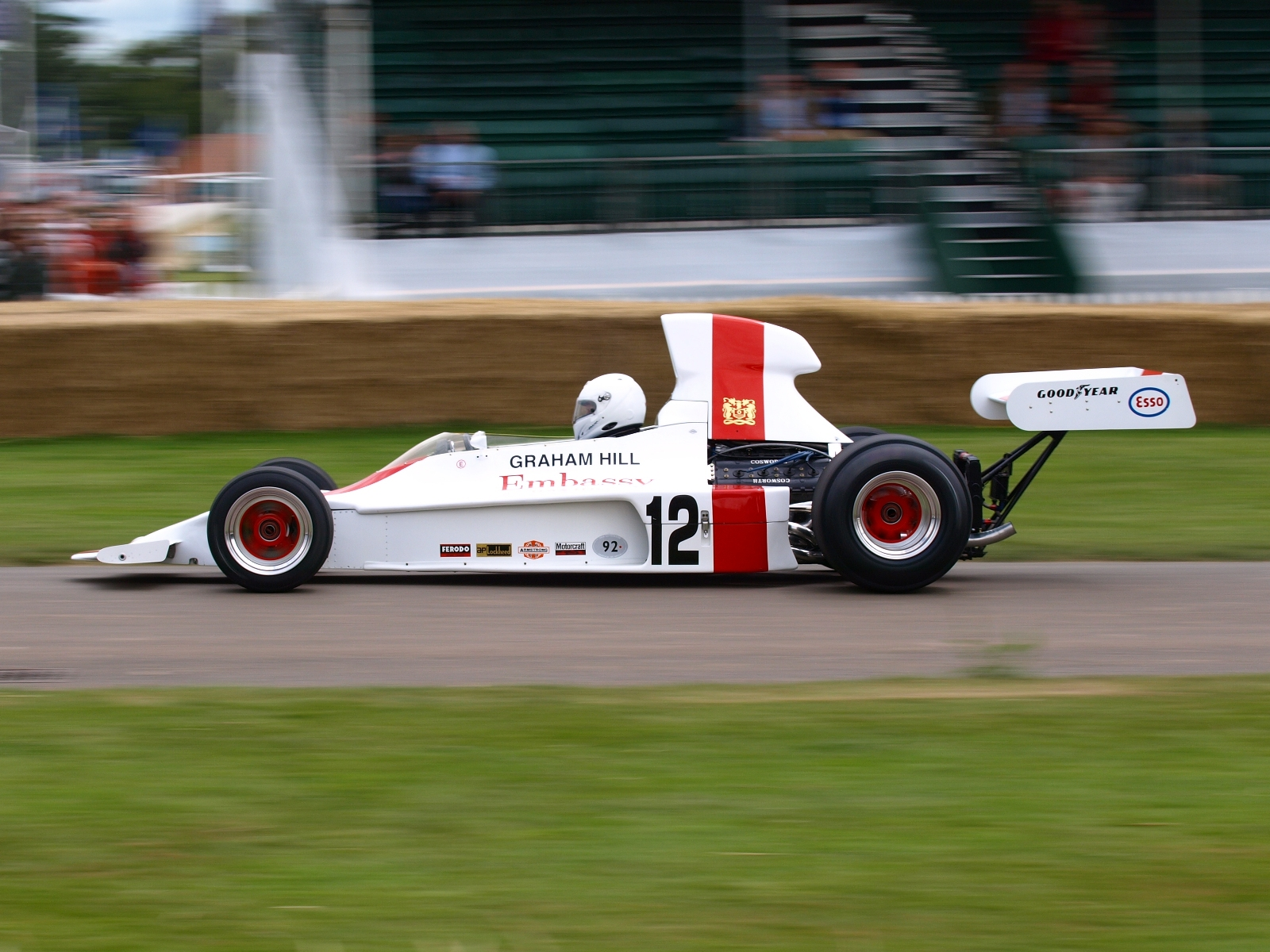
The Embassy Hill Shadow DN1 from 1973 being demonstrated at the 2008 Goodwood Festival of Speed

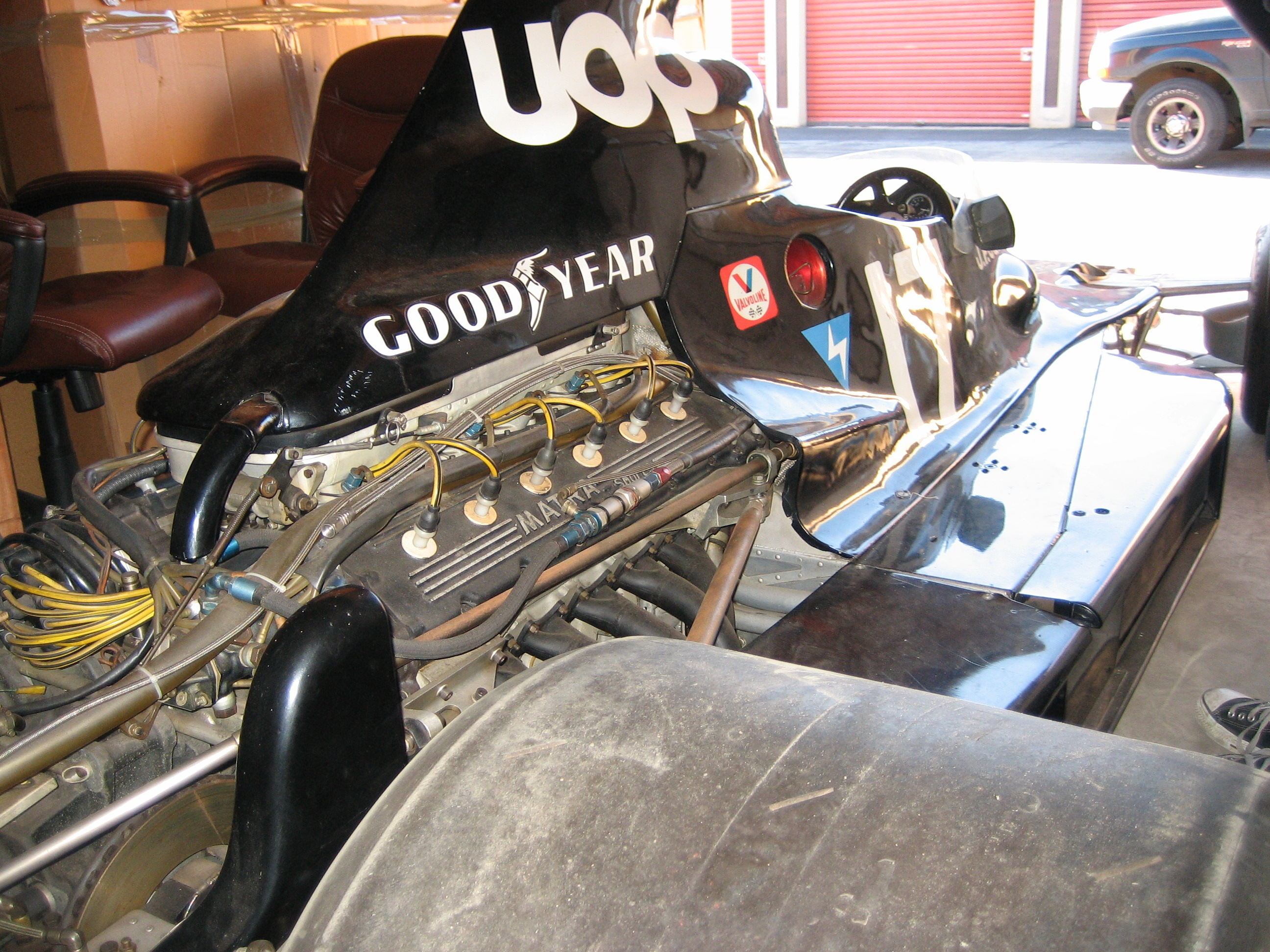
Matra-powered DN7 driven by Jean-Pierre Jarier as a one-off during the 1975 Austrian Grand Prix

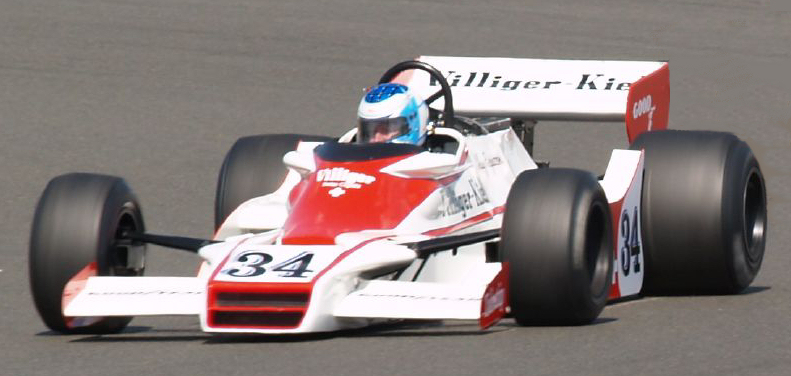
The DN9 was copied by Arrows before a court order banned Arrows from racing their version, the FA/1

Shadow Racing Cars was a Formula One and sports car racing team and constructor.

The sports car racing team, competing in the CanAm series, was founded in 1968 and was based in the United States. The Formula One team was founded in 1973 and was based in Northampton, the United Kingdom. The Formula One team held an American licence from 1973 to 1975 and a British licence from 1976 to 1980, thus becoming the first Formula One team to have officially changed its nationality. As a result, the only Formula One victory of the Shadow team at the 1977 Austrian Grand Prix was achieved under a British nationality.

The Shadow name was revived by Bernardo Manfrè in 2020 as an Italian car tuning and luxury brand. The revived Shadow brand currently competes in NASCAR Whelen Euro Series as the MK1 Racing Italia team, currently fielding the No. 16 Shadow DNM8 for Claudio Remigio Cappelli and Alfredo de Matteo and the No. 17 Shadow DNM8 for Manfrè and Francesco Garisto with technical partnership from Race Art Technology.

== History ==
=== 1968–1972: Early years in CanAm series ===
The company was founded by Don Nichols in California in 1968 as "Advanced Vehicle Systems"; the cars were called Shadows, designed by Trevor Harris and entered under the Shadow Racing Inc. banner. The first Shadows, the Mk.Is, were entered in the CanAm series with George Follmer and Vic Elford driving them. The Mk.1 featured an innovative design, using very small wheels for low drag and, although the car was quick, it was not the most reliable car in the field.

The team became more competitive the following year, replacing the Harris car with a Peter Bryant design owing some elements to his Ti22 "titanium car" with Jackie Oliver also arriving from this effort and finishing eighth in the CanAm championship. The team also found some financial backing from Universal Oil Products (UOP).

Shadow came to dominate the shortened 1974 series with the DN4, although by this point they were competing largely against privateers, the works McLaren and Porsche efforts having left the series.

=== 1973–1974: Entry into Formula One ===
Towards the end of 1972, Nichols announced that he would enter his team into Formula One in the 1973 season with UOP sponsored cars designed by Tony Southgate, who had designed the BRM that gave Jean-Pierre Beltoise victory at the Monaco Grand Prix the previous year.

The team debuted in Formula One at the 1973 South African Grand Prix with the Shadow DN1 chassis. Two cars were available for drivers Oliver and Follmer, as well as one car for the privateer team Embassy Hill of Graham Hill who ran his team alongside the Shadow works team.

For the 1974 season, the team hired two of the most promising drivers of the time: American Peter Revson and Frenchman Jean-Pierre Jarier. During a practice run for the 1974 South African Grand Prix, Revson was killed by a suspension failure on his DN3 car. He was replaced by Tom Pryce.

=== 1975–1977: Peak of success ===
The new DN5 driven by Jarier gained pole position in the two first Grands Prix of the 1975 season but suffered mechanical failure in both races. The DN5 and most other Shadow Formula One cars used Ford Cosworth DFV engines, which produced around 490 bhp. However, later in 1975, another car was driven by Jarier, the DN7, and was fitted with a Matra V12 engine producing around 550 bhp. The wheelbase was substantially lengthened to accommodate the much larger and more expensive French powerplant, although due to budgetary issues, the Matra-powered DN7 was doomed as a one-off. Jarier's new teammate, Pryce, won the non-championship Race of Champions that same year. Pryce died in an accident involving a marshal at the 1977 South African Grand Prix. The marshal, Frederick Jansen Van Vuuren, had been running across the track to put out a small fire on the other Shadow car and Pryce was unable to avoid the collision because he was un-sighted behind the March of Hans-Joachim Stuck. Pryce struck Van Vuuren at speed and was hit on the head and killed by the fire extinguisher Van Vuuren was carrying. Before Pryce's car finally came to a stop it hit Jacques Laffite's Ligier resulting in both cars crashing into the barriers. Van Vuuren's injuries were so severe that he could initially only be identified by his absence from a marshal's meeting after the accident.

The team replaced Pryce with Alan Jones, who won the team's only Grand Prix at the Austrian Grand Prix the same year. Zorzi would only last 2 more rounds after the South African Grand Prix, eventually being replaced by future Grand Prix winner Riccardo Patrese in Monaco.

=== 1978–1980: Decline ===
After the 1977 season Shadow entered into a sharp decline. Jones left to join Williams for 1978. In the same period a majority of their staff and their sponsor Franco Ambrosio left to form their team, Arrows, taking the young Riccardo Patrese. Despite sponsorship from Villiger tobacco and the signing of experienced drivers Clay Regazzoni and Hans-Joachim Stuck for the 1978 season, results were poor, with three fifth-place finishes, two by Regazzoni and one by Stuck. Regazzoni would have an indian summer teaming up with Jones at Williams for 1979, winning the 1979 British Grand Prix, while Stuck went to ATS for what turned out to be his final season in F1. For 1979, the team employed two young drivers, Dutchman Jan Lammers and Italian Elio de Angelis. The team only had one points finish all year, with de Angelis' 4th coming at the 1979 United States Grand Prix. After that season, de Angelis left to join the Lotus outfit while Lammers replaced Stuck at ATS. In 1980 they were absorbed into Theodore Racing, but Shadow's first ground effect chassis was largely uncompetitive, only once qualifying a car in seven races, with three different drivers (Geoff Lees, who gave Shadow their only qualification at the South African Grand Prix; David Kennedy; and Stefan Johansson). Sponsorship dried up and after the seventh of the year's 14 races Teddy Yip wound up the Shadow team.

=== 2020–present: Revival and NASCAR participation ===
In 2020, 40 years after Shadow last raced in Formula One, it was announced that the Shadow Racing Cars name will be revived by Italian entrepreneur and racing driver Bernardo Manfrè as an Italian car tuning and luxury brand. Plans have been announced by the revived Shadow to develop a hypercar called Hypercar Shadow and a modified variant of the Dodge Challenger known as the Dodge Challenger Shadow DNB8 (later renamed as the Shadow DNM8). Shadow Racing Cars also entered the NASCAR Whelen Euro Series in 2020 under the banner of Swiss-based team 42 Racing, fielding owner Manfrè in the team's No. 17 Ford Mustang along with Luigi Ferrara and Francesco Garisto in the No. 42 Ford Mustang. While the team was initially scheduled to enter the full-season, the team missed the second half of the season after members of the Shadow team was tested positive for COVID-19 prior to both NASCAR GP Croatia at Rijeka and Valencian Super Speedweek at Valencia.

The team would make its return in 2021 with a Shadow DNM8-based chassis, the first racing chassis to be entered under the Shadow Racing Cars name since the Shadow DN12 was last raced in the 1980 French Grand Prix. The team's EuroNASCAR 2 driver Francesco Garisto finished fifth with the #42 Shadow DNM8 that year after scoring two podium finishes at Most and Vallelunga. Shadow and 42 Racing parted ways at the conclusion of the 2021 season and the team would begin to compete under the MK1 Racing Italia banner starting from the 2022 season and moved the team's base from Lugano to Bollate in Italy. Shadow would retain Manfrè and Garisto, now competing with the #17 team, as they signed Claudio Remigio Cappelli and Alfredo de Matteo to compete with the #16 team, which was rebranded from the #42 team. Shadow would also receive technical support from fellow competitor Race Art Technology to help field the two Shadow DNM8's in 2022.

== Racecars ==
Year	Car	Image	Category
1970	AVS Shadow		Can-Am; Group 7
1971	Shadow Mk.II		Can-Am; Group 7
1972	Shadow DN2		Can-Am; Group 7
1973	Shadow DN1		Formula One
1974	Shadow DN3		Formula One
1974	Shadow DN4		Can-Am; Group 7
1975	Shadow DN5		Formula One
1975	Shadow DN6		Formula 5000
1975	Shadow DN7		Formula One
1976	Shadow DN8		Formula One
1978	Shadow DN9		Formula One
1980	Shadow DN11		Formula One
1980	Shadow DN12		Formula One

== Complete Formula One results ==
=== Works team entries ===
(key)

Year	Name	Chassis	Engines	Tyres	Drivers	1	2	3	4	5	6	7	8	9	10	11	12	13	14	15	16	17	Points	WCC
1973	(United States) UOP Shadow Racing	DN1	Ford Cosworth DFV 3.0 V8	G		ARG	BRA	RSA	ESP	BEL	MON	SWE	FRA	GBR	NED	GER	AUT	ITA	CAN	USA			9	8th
1973	(United States) UOP Shadow Racing	DN1	Ford Cosworth DFV 3.0 V8	G	(United Kingdom) Jackie Oliver			Ret	Ret	Ret	10	Ret	Ret	Ret	Ret	8	Ret	11	3	15			9	8th
1973	(United States) UOP Shadow Racing	DN1	Ford Cosworth DFV 3.0 V8	G	(United States) George Follmer			6	3	Ret	DNS	14	Ret	Ret	10	Ret	Ret	10	17	14			9	8th
1973	(United States) UOP Shadow Racing	DN1	Ford Cosworth DFV 3.0 V8	G	(United Kingdom) Brian Redman															DSQ			9	8th
1974	(United States) UOP Shadow Racing	DN1; DN3	Ford Cosworth DFV 3.0 V8	G		ARG	BRA	RSA	ESP	BEL	MON	SWE	NED	FRA	GBR	GER	AUT	ITA	CAN	USA			7	8th
1974	(United States) UOP Shadow Racing	DN1; DN3	Ford Cosworth DFV 3.0 V8	G	(United States) Peter Revson	Ret	Ret	DNP															7	8th
1974	(United States) UOP Shadow Racing	DN1; DN3	Ford Cosworth DFV 3.0 V8	G	(United Kingdom) Brian Redman				7	18	Ret												7	8th
1974	(United States) UOP Shadow Racing	DN1; DN3	Ford Cosworth DFV 3.0 V8	G	(Sweden) Bertil Roos							Ret											7	8th
1974	(United States) UOP Shadow Racing	DN1; DN3	Ford Cosworth DFV 3.0 V8	G	(United Kingdom) Tom Pryce								Ret	Ret	8	6	Ret	10	Ret	NC			7	8th
1974	(United States) UOP Shadow Racing	DN1; DN3	Ford Cosworth DFV 3.0 V8	G	(France) Jean-Pierre Jarier	Ret	Ret	DNP	NC	13	3	5	Ret	12	Ret	8	8	Ret	Ret	10			7	8th
1975	(United States) UOP Shadow Racing	DN3; DN5	Ford Cosworth DFV 3.0 V8	G		ARG	BRA	RSA	ESP	MON	BEL	SWE	NED	FRA	GBR	GER	AUT	ITA	USA				9.5	6th
1975	(United States) UOP Shadow Racing	DN3; DN5	Ford Cosworth DFV 3.0 V8	G	(United Kingdom) Tom Pryce	12^{†}	Ret	9	Ret	Ret	6	Ret	6	Ret	Ret^{P}	4	3^{‡}	6	NC				9.5	6th
1975	(United States) UOP Shadow Racing	DN3; DN5	Ford Cosworth DFV 3.0 V8	G	(France) Jean-Pierre Jarier	DNS^{P}	Ret^{P}^{F}	Ret	4^{‡}	Ret	Ret	Ret	Ret	8	14^{†}	Ret			Ret				9.5	6th
1975	(United States) UOP Shadow Racing	DN7	Matra MS73 3.0 V12	G	(France) Jean-Pierre Jarier												Ret	Ret					0	NC
1976	(United Kingdom) Lucky Strike Shadow Racing (United Kingdom) Tabatip Shadow Racing	DN5; DN5B; DN8	Ford Cosworth DFV 3.0 V8	G		BRA	RSA	USW	ESP	BEL	MON	SWE	FRA	GBR	GER	AUT	NED	ITA	CAN	USA	JPN		10	8th
1976	(United Kingdom) Lucky Strike Shadow Racing (United Kingdom) Tabatip Shadow Racing	DN5; DN5B; DN8	Ford Cosworth DFV 3.0 V8	G	(United Kingdom) Tom Pryce	3	7	Ret	8	10	7	9	8	4	8	Ret	4	8	11	Ret	Ret		10	8th
1976	(United Kingdom) Lucky Strike Shadow Racing (United Kingdom) Tabatip Shadow Racing	DN5; DN5B; DN8	Ford Cosworth DFV 3.0 V8	G	(France) Jean-Pierre Jarier	Ret^{F}	Ret	7	Ret	9	8	12	12	9	11	Ret	10	19	18	10	10		10	8th
1977	(United Kingdom) Ambrosio Tabatip Shadow Racing	DN5B; DN8	Ford Cosworth DFV 3.0 V8	G		ARG	BRA	RSA	USW	ESP	MON	BEL	SWE	FRA	GBR	GER	AUT	NED	ITA	USA	CAN	JPN	23	7th
1977	(United Kingdom) Ambrosio Tabatip Shadow Racing	DN5B; DN8	Ford Cosworth DFV 3.0 V8	G	(United Kingdom) Tom Pryce	NC	Ret	Ret															23	7th
1977	(United Kingdom) Ambrosio Tabatip Shadow Racing	DN5B; DN8	Ford Cosworth DFV 3.0 V8	G	(Italy) Riccardo Patrese						9	Ret		Ret	Ret	10		13	Ret		10	6	23	7th
1977	(United Kingdom) Ambrosio Tabatip Shadow Racing	DN5B; DN8	Ford Cosworth DFV 3.0 V8	G	(United Kingdom) Jackie Oliver								9										23	7th
1977	(United Kingdom) Ambrosio Tabatip Shadow Racing	DN5B; DN8	Ford Cosworth DFV 3.0 V8	G	(Italy) Arturo Merzario												Ret						23	7th
1977	(United Kingdom) Ambrosio Tabatip Shadow Racing	DN5B; DN8	Ford Cosworth DFV 3.0 V8	G	(France) Jean-Pierre Jarier															9			23	7th
1977	(United Kingdom) Ambrosio Tabatip Shadow Racing	DN5B; DN8	Ford Cosworth DFV 3.0 V8	G	(Italy) Renzo Zorzi	Ret	6	Ret	Ret	Ret													23	7th
1977	(United Kingdom) Ambrosio Tabatip Shadow Racing	DN5B; DN8	Ford Cosworth DFV 3.0 V8	G	(Australia) Alan Jones				Ret	Ret	6	5	17	Ret	7	Ret	1	Ret	3	Ret	4	4	23	7th
1978	(United Kingdom) Villiger Shadow Racing	DN8; DN9	Ford Cosworth DFV 3.0 V8	G		ARG	BRA	RSA	USW	MON	BEL	ESP	SWE	FRA	GBR	GER	AUT	NED	ITA	USA	CAN		6	11th
1978	(United Kingdom) Villiger Shadow Racing	DN8; DN9	Ford Cosworth DFV 3.0 V8	G	(Germany) Hans-Joachim Stuck	17	Ret	DNQ	DNS	Ret	Ret	Ret	11	11	5	Ret	Ret	Ret	Ret	Ret	Ret		6	11th
1978	(United Kingdom) Villiger Shadow Racing	DN8; DN9	Ford Cosworth DFV 3.0 V8	G	(Switzerland) Clay Regazzoni	15	5	DNQ	10	DNQ	Ret	15^{†}	5	Ret	Ret	DNQ	NC	DNQ	NC	14	DNQ		6	11th
1979	(United Kingdom) Samson Shadow Racing (United Kingdom) Interscope Shadow Racing	DN9	Ford Cosworth DFV 3.0 V8	G		ARG	BRA	RSA	USW	ESP	BEL	MON	FRA	GBR	GER	AUT	NED	ITA	CAN	USA			3	10th
1979	(United Kingdom) Samson Shadow Racing (United Kingdom) Interscope Shadow Racing	DN9	Ford Cosworth DFV 3.0 V8	G	(Netherlands) Jan Lammers	Ret	14	Ret	Ret	12	10	DNQ	18	11	10	Ret	Ret	DNQ	9	DNQ			3	10th
1979	(United Kingdom) Samson Shadow Racing (United Kingdom) Interscope Shadow Racing	DN9	Ford Cosworth DFV 3.0 V8	G	(Italy) Elio de Angelis	7	12	Ret	7	Ret	Ret	DNQ	16	12	11	Ret	Ret	Ret	Ret	4			3	10th
1980	(United Kingdom) Theodore Shadow (United Kingdom) Shadow Cars	DN11; DN12	Ford Cosworth DFV 3.0 V8	G		ARG	BRA	RSA	USW	BEL	MON	FRA	GBR	GER	AUT	NED	ITA	CAN	USA				0	NC
1980	(United Kingdom) Theodore Shadow (United Kingdom) Shadow Cars	DN11; DN12	Ford Cosworth DFV 3.0 V8	G	(Sweden) Stefan Johansson	DNQ	DNQ																0	NC
1980	(United Kingdom) Theodore Shadow (United Kingdom) Shadow Cars	DN11; DN12	Ford Cosworth DFV 3.0 V8	G	(United Kingdom) Geoff Lees			13	DNQ	DNQ	DNQ	DNQ											0	NC
1980	(United Kingdom) Theodore Shadow (United Kingdom) Shadow Cars	DN11; DN12	Ford Cosworth DFV 3.0 V8	G	(Republic of Ireland) David Kennedy	DNQ	DNQ	DNQ	DNQ	DNQ	DNQ	DNQ											0	NC

Notes

- † – The driver did not finish the Grand Prix, but was classified, as he completed over 90% of the race distance.
- ‡ – Half points awarded as less than 75% of the race distance was completed.

=== Results of other Shadow cars ===
(key)

Year	Entrant(s)	Chassis	Engine	Tyres	Driver(s)	1	2	3	4	5	6	7	8	9	10	11	12	13	14	15	16
1973						ARG	BRA	RSA	ESP	BEL	MON	SWE	FRA	GBR	NED	GER	AUT	ITA	CAN	USA	
1973	(United Kingdom) Embassy Racing	Shadow DN1	Ford Cosworth DFV 3.0 V8	G	(United Kingdom) Graham Hill				Ret	9	Ret	Ret	10	Ret	NC	13	Ret	14	16	13	
1976						BRA	RSA	USW	ESP	BEL	MON	SWE	FRA	GBR	GER	AUT	NED	ITA	CAN	USA	JPN
1976	(United Kingdom) Team P R Reilly	Shadow DN3	Ford Cosworth DFV 3.0 V8	G	(United Kingdom) Mike Wilds									DNQ							
1978						ARG	BRA	RSA	USW	MON	BEL	ESP	SWE	FRA	GBR	GER	AUT	NED	ITA	USA	CAN
1978	(United States) Interscope Racing	Shadow DN9	Ford Cosworth DFV 3.0 V8	G	(United States) Danny Ongais				DNPQ									DNPQ			
