= 1977 Brazilian Grand Prix =

- Race 2 of 17 in the 1977 Formula One season

Race details
- Date: 23 January 1977
- Location: São Paulo, Brazil
- Course: Permanent race track
- Course length: 7.960 km (4.946 miles)
- Distance: 40 laps, 318.400 km (197.845 miles)
- Weather: Dry

Pole position
Driver	(United Kingdom) James Hunt	McLaren-Ford
- Time: 2:30.11

Fastest lap
Driver	(United Kingdom) James Hunt	McLaren-Ford
- Time: 2:34.55 on lap 21

Podium
First	(Argentina) Carlos Reutemann	Ferrari
Second	(United Kingdom) James Hunt	McLaren-Ford
Third	(Austria) Niki Lauda	Ferrari

The 1977 Brazilian Grand Prix was a Formula One motor race held at Interlagos on 23 January 1977.

== Qualifying ==
=== Qualifying classification ===
Pos.	Driver	Constructor	Time	No
1	(United Kingdom) James Hunt	McLaren-Ford	2:30.11	1
2	(Argentina) Carlos Reutemann	Ferrari	2:30.18	2
3	(United States) Mario Andretti	Lotus-Ford	2:30.35	3
4	(Germany) Jochen Mass	McLaren-Ford	2:30.36	4
5	(Brazil) Carlos Pace	Brabham-Alfa Romeo	2:30.57	5
6	(France) Patrick Depailler	Tyrrell-Ford	2:30.69	6
7	(United Kingdom) John Watson	Brabham-Alfa Romeo	2:31.09	7
8	(Sweden) Ronnie Peterson	Tyrrell-Ford	2:31.63	8
9	(Switzerland) Clay Regazzoni	Ensign-Ford	2:31.69	9
10	(Sweden) Gunnar Nilsson	Lotus-Ford	2:32.14	10
11	(Italy) Vittorio Brambilla	Surtees-Ford	2:32.19	11
12	(United Kingdom) Tom Pryce	Shadow-Ford	2:32.22	12
13	(Austria) Niki Lauda	Ferrari	2:32.37	13
14	(France) Jacques Laffite	Ligier-Matra	2:32.43	14
15	(South Africa) Jody Scheckter	Wolf-Ford	2:32.81	15
16	(Brazil) Emerson Fittipaldi	Fittipaldi-Ford	2:32.94	16
17	(South Africa) Ian Scheckter	March-Ford	2:33.46	17
18	(Italy) Renzo Zorzi	Shadow-Ford	2:34.62	18
19	(Brazil) Ingo Hoffmann	Fittipaldi-Ford	2:35.57	19
20	(Austria) Hans Binder	Surtees-Ford	2:35.79	20
21	(Brazil) Alex Ribeiro	March-Ford	2:36.19	21
22	(Australia) Larry Perkins	BRM	2:42.22	22

== Race ==
=== Report ===
James Hunt took pole again with Carlos Reutemann second and Mario Andretti third on the grid. Home hero Carlos Pace took the lead at the start, with Hunt dropping behind Reutemann as well but soon Hunt was back behind Pace and attacking. There was contact, and Hunt took the lead whereas Pace had to pit for repairs. Hunt led Reutemann until he began to suffer from tyre troubles and was passed by Reutemann. Hunt pitted for new tyres, and rejoined fourth and soon passed Niki Lauda in the Ferrari and John Watson to reclaim second. Reutemann marched on to victory, Hunt was second and Lauda third after Watson crashed out.

== Classification ==
Pos	No	Driver	Constructor	Laps	Time/Retired	Grid	Points
1	12	(Argentina) Carlos Reutemann	Ferrari	40	1:45:07.72	2	9
2	1	(United Kingdom) James Hunt	McLaren-Ford	40	+ 10.71	1	6
3	11	(Austria) Niki Lauda	Ferrari	40	+ 1:47.51	13	4
4	28	(Brazil) Emerson Fittipaldi	Fittipaldi-Ford	39	+ 1 Lap	16	3
5	6	(Sweden) Gunnar Nilsson	Lotus-Ford	39	+ 1 Lap	10	2
6	17	(Italy) Renzo Zorzi	Shadow-Ford	39	+ 1 Lap	18	1
7	29	(Brazil) Ingo Hoffmann	Fittipaldi-Ford	38	+ 2 Laps	19	
Ret	8	(Brazil) Carlos Pace	Brabham-Alfa Romeo	33	Accident	5	
Ret	16	(United Kingdom) Tom Pryce	Shadow-Ford	33	Engine	12	
Ret	18	(Austria) Hans Binder	Surtees-Ford	32	Suspension	20	
Ret	7	(United Kingdom) John Watson	Brabham-Alfa Romeo	30	Accident	7	
Ret	26	(France) Jacques Laffite	Ligier-Matra	26	Accident	14	
Ret	4	(France) Patrick Depailler	Tyrrell-Ford	23	Accident	6	
Ret	5	(United States) Mario Andretti	Lotus-Ford	19	Ignition	3	
Ret	9	(Brazil) Alex Ribeiro	March-Ford	16	Engine	21	
Ret	2	(Germany) Jochen Mass	McLaren-Ford	12	Accident	4	
Ret	3	(Sweden) Ronnie Peterson	Tyrrell-Ford	12	Accident	8	
Ret	22	(Switzerland) Clay Regazzoni	Ensign-Ford	12	Accident	9	
Ret	19	(Italy) Vittorio Brambilla	Surtees-Ford	11	Accident	11	
Ret	20	(South Africa) Jody Scheckter	Wolf-Ford	11	Engine	15	
Ret	10	(South Africa) Ian Scheckter	March-Ford	1	Transmission	17	
Ret	14	(Australia) Larry Perkins	BRM	1	Overheating	22	

== Notes ==
- This was the 2nd win of the Brazilian Grand Prix for Ferrari, setting a new record of multiple wins in Brazil. It broke the previous record set by Lotus at the 1973 Brazilian Grand Prix.

== Championship standings after the race ==
Drivers' Championship standings

	Pos	Driver	Points
2	1	(Argentina) Carlos Reutemann	13
1	2	(South Africa) Jody Scheckter	9
1	3	(Brazil) Carlos Pace	6
10	4	(United Kingdom) James Hunt	6
1	5	(Brazil) Emerson Fittipaldi	6

Constructors' Championship standings

	Pos	Constructor	Points
2	1	(Italy) Ferrari	13
1	2	(Canada) Wolf-Ford	9
1	3	(United Kingdom) Brabham-Alfa Romeo	6
3	4	(United Kingdom) McLaren-Ford	6
1	5	(Brazil) Fittipaldi-Ford	6

- Note: Only the top five positions are included for both sets of standings.

Previous race: 1977 Argentine Grand Prix	FIA Formula One World Championship; 1977 season	Next race: 1977 South African Grand Prix
Previous race: 1976 Brazilian Grand Prix	Brazilian Grand Prix	Next race: 1978 Brazilian Grand Prix
