= 1976 Brazilian Grand Prix =

Race 1 of 16 in the 1976 Formula One season
Next race →

Race details
- Date: January 25, 1976
- Official name: V Grande Prêmio do Brasil
- Location: São Paulo, Brazil
- Course: Permanent racing facility
- Course length: 7.960 km (4.946 miles)
- Distance: 40 laps, 318.400 km (197.845 miles)
- Weather: Sunny

Pole position
Driver	(United Kingdom) James Hunt	McLaren-Ford
- Time: 2:32.50

Fastest lap
Driver	(France) Jean-Pierre Jarier	Shadow-Ford
- Time: 2:35.07 on lap 31

Podium
First	(Austria) Niki Lauda	Ferrari
Second	(France) Patrick Depailler	Tyrrell-Ford
Third	(United Kingdom) Tom Pryce	Shadow-Ford

The 1976 Brazilian Grand Prix was a Formula One motor race held at Interlagos in São Paulo, Brazil on 25 January 1976. It was the opening round of the 1976 Formula One season. The race was the fifth Brazilian Grand Prix and the fourth to be held for the World Drivers' Championship. The race was held over 40 laps of the 7.87-kilometre circuit for a total race distance of 315 kilometres.

The race was won by defending world champion, Niki Lauda, driving a Ferrari 312T. The Austrian driver won his eighth Formula One Grand Prix by 28 seconds over French driver Patrick Depailler in a Tyrrell 007. Second place was Depailler's best finish in almost two years having finished second previously at the 1974 Swedish Grand Prix. Tom Pryce finished third in a Shadow DN5B in his second podium in six months. It would prove to be the season highlight for Pryce and for Shadow Racing Cars. It was their only podium for the season and Pryce would not stand on the podium again.

== Qualifying ==
=== Qualifying classification ===
Pos.	No.	Driver	Constructor	Time	No
1	11	(United Kingdom) James Hunt	McLaren-Ford	2:32.50	1
2	1	(Austria) Niki Lauda	Ferrari	2:32.52	2
3	17	(France) Jean-Pierre Jarier	Shadow-Ford	2:32.66	3
4	2	(Switzerland) Clay Regazzoni	Ferrari	2:33.17	4
5	30	(Brazil) Emerson Fittipaldi	Fittipaldi-Ford	2:33.33	5
6	12	(Germany) Jochen Mass	McLaren-Ford	2:33.59	6
7	9	(Italy) Vittorio Brambilla	March-Ford	2:33.63	7
8	28	(United Kingdom) John Watson	Penske-Ford	2:33.87	8
9	4	(France) Patrick Depailler	Tyrrell-Ford	2:34.49	9
10	8	(Brazil) Carlos Pace	Brabham-Alfa Romeo	2:34.54	10
11	26	(France) Jacques Laffite	Ligier-Matra	2:34.67	11
12	16	(United Kingdom) Tom Pryce	Shadow-Ford	2:34.84	12
13	3	(South Africa) Jody Scheckter	Tyrrell-Ford	2:35.02	13
14	34	(Germany) Hans-Joachim Stuck	March-Ford	2:35.38	14
15	7	(Argentina) Carlos Reutemann	Brabham-Alfa Romeo	2:35.97	15
16	6	(United States) Mario Andretti	Lotus-Ford	2:36.01	16
17	21	(Italy) Renzo Zorzi	Wolf-Williams-Ford	2:37.07	17
18	5	(Sweden) Ronnie Peterson	Lotus-Ford	2:37.19	18
19	20	(Belgium) Jacky Ickx	Wolf-Williams-Ford	2:37.62	19
20	31	(Brazil) Ingo Hoffmann	Fittipaldi-Ford	2:40.25	20
21	14	(United Kingdom) Ian Ashley	BRM	2:40.94	21
22	10	(Italy) Lella Lombardi	March-Ford	2:40.95	22

== Race ==
=== Summary ===
For the opening round of the season, James Hunt took his first Formula 1 pole position with reigning champion Niki Lauda alongside in his Ferrari. Emerson Fittipaldi qualified fifth on his debut for his brother Wilson's Copersucar team. Clay Regazzoni in the second Ferrari took the lead at the start. Lotus teammates Andretti and Peterson collided on the first lap, both retiring as a result. Lauda was still in the lead ahead of Hunt and Jarier. Hunt crashed out due to a sticking throttle, and Jarier did the same a lap later after driving on some oil in the track from Hunt's car. Fittipaldi's debut race for Copersucar failed to live up to its initial promise, the Brazilian double world champion ending up three laps down after various technical problems. Lauda thus started his title defence with victory, with Patrick Depailler second in the Tyrrell, and Tom Pryce completing the podium in the other Shadow.

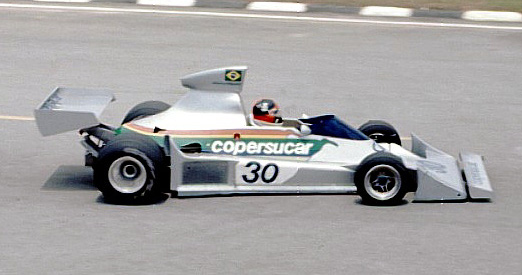
Emerson Fittipaldi in a Fittipaldi FD04.

=== Classification ===
Pos	No	Driver	Constructor	Laps	Time/Retired	Grid	Points
1	1	(Austria) Niki Lauda	Ferrari	40	1:45:16.78	2	9
2	4	(France) Patrick Depailler	Tyrrell-Ford	40	+ 21.47	9	6
3	16	(United Kingdom) Tom Pryce	Shadow-Ford	40	+ 23.84	12	4
4	34	(West Germany) Hans-Joachim Stuck	March-Ford	40	+ 1:28.17	14	3
5	3	(South Africa) Jody Scheckter	Tyrrell-Ford	40	+ 1:56.46	13	2
6	12	(West Germany) Jochen Mass	McLaren-Ford	40	+ 1:58.27	6	1
7	2	(Switzerland) Clay Regazzoni	Ferrari	40	+ 2:15.24	4	
8	20	(Belgium) Jacky Ickx	Wolf-Williams-Ford	39	+ 1 lap	19	
9	21	(Italy) Renzo Zorzi	Wolf-Williams-Ford	39	+ 1 lap	17	
10	8	(Brazil) Carlos Pace	Brabham-Alfa Romeo	39	+ 1 Lap	10	
11	31	(Brazil) Ingo Hoffmann	Fittipaldi-Ford	39	+ 1 Lap	20	
12	7	(Argentina) Carlos Reutemann	Brabham-Alfa Romeo	37	Out of Fuel	15	
13	30	(Brazil) Emerson Fittipaldi	Fittipaldi-Ford	37	+ 3 Laps	5	
14	10	(Italy) Lella Lombardi	March-Ford	36	+ 4 Laps	22	
Ret	17	(France) Jean-Pierre Jarier	Shadow-Ford	33	Accident	3	
Ret	11	(United Kingdom) James Hunt	McLaren-Ford	32	Throttle/Accident	1	
Ret	9	(Italy) Vittorio Brambilla	March-Ford	15	Oil Leak	7	
Ret	26	(France) Jacques Laffite	Ligier-Matra	14	Transmission	11	
Ret	5	(Sweden) Ronnie Peterson	Lotus-Ford	10	Accident	18	
Ret	6	(United States) Mario Andretti	Lotus-Ford	6	Accident	16	
Ret	28	(United Kingdom) John Watson	Penske-Ford	2	Fuel System	8	
Ret	14	(United Kingdom) Ian Ashley	BRM	2	Oil Pump	21	

== Notes ==
- This was the Formula One World Championship debut for Brazilian driver Ingo Hoffmann (record holder of titles in the Stock Car Pro Series in Brazil).
- This was the 5th pole position for British constructor McLaren.
- This was the Formula One World Championship debut for British-Canadian constructor Wolf-Williams and French constructor Ligier.
- This race marked the 5th podium finish for British-American constructor Shadow.

== Championship standings after the race ==
Drivers' Championship standings

Pos	Driver	Points
1	(Austria) Niki Lauda	9
2	(France) Patrick Depailler	6
3	(United Kingdom) Tom Pryce	4
4	(Germany) Hans-Joachim Stuck	3
5	(South Africa) Jody Scheckter	2

Constructors' Championship standings

Pos	Constructor	Points
1	(Italy) Ferrari	9
2	(United Kingdom) Tyrrell-Ford	6
3	(United Kingdom) Shadow-Ford	4
4	(United Kingdom) March-Ford	3
5	(United Kingdom) McLaren-Ford	1

- Note: Only the top five positions are included for both sets of standings.

Previous race: 1975 United States Grand Prix	FIA Formula One World Championship; 1976 season	Next race: 1976 South African Grand Prix
Previous race: 1975 Brazilian Grand Prix	Brazilian Grand Prix	Next race: 1977 Brazilian Grand Prix
