= Tony Southgate =

British engineer and car designer (born 1940)

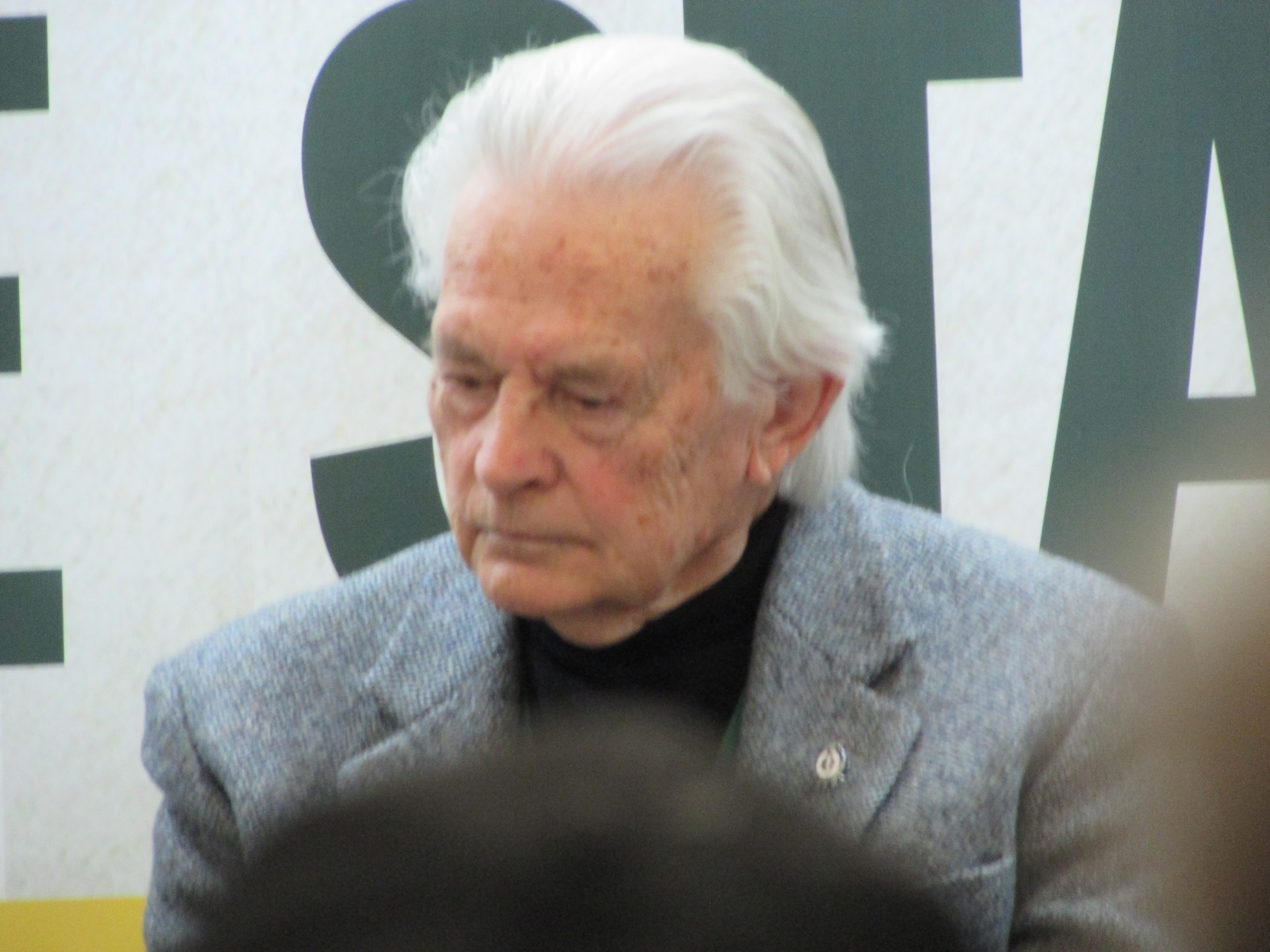
Southgate in 2023

Anthony J. Southgate (born 25 May 1940, Coventry, England) is an English engineer and former racing car designer. He designed many successful cars, including Jaguar's Le Mans-winning XJR-9, and cars for almost every type of circuit racing. He was responsible for the chassis design of Ford's RS200 Group B rally car. Southgate was employed as chief designer or technical director for many Formula One teams for over twenty years. These teams included BRM, Shadow and Arrows. Southgate retired after producing the Audi R8C, which was a major influence in the Bentley Speed 8, which won Le Mans in 2003. He continues to be a regular visitor to current and historic race meetings.

Southgate is the only chief engineer to have won the Triple Crown of Motorsport with his cars: Indianapolis 500 with Eagle TG2 in 1968, the Monaco Grand Prix with the BRM P160B and the 24 Hours of Le Mans in 1988 and 1990 with Jaguar XJR-9 and Jaguar XJR-12.

== Early career at Lola and Eagle ==
Tony Southgate became interested in motorsport during his engineering apprenticeship and, like many aspiring racing designers in the late 1950s, was a member of the 750 Motor Club. The 750MC was a training ground for Colin Chapman, Eric Broadley, Brian Hart and others who achieved success in motorsport. In 1962 Broadley gave Southgate his first job, as a draughtsman for Lola Cars. Southgate gained a broad grounding in many areas of motorsport design while at Lola. He was involved in projects as wide-ranging as the lithe, 1.5 litre Lola Mk4A Formula One car and the 5.0 litre Lola T70 sports car. He also assisted with designs for IndyCar chassis, one of which evolved into the Honda RA300 Hondola Formula One race-winner.

It was his experience with single-seater and IndyCar designs which prompted Dan Gurney to hire Southgate for his All American Racers team, based in California, to design some of the second generation of Gurney-Eagle USAC racers. The highlight of Southgate's time with AAR was when Bobby Unser won the 1968 Indianapolis 500 race in one of Southgate's Eagle cars. The Southgate-designed Eagle Formula 5000 car also found some success.

== Promotion with BRM ==
In 1969 Tony Southgate moved back to the UK and took a job as Chief Designer for the BRM Formula One team. Southgate's first BRM car, the BRM P153, appeared in time for the first race of the 1970 season in South Africa. BRM enjoyed a renaissance with the P153 and its successor the BRM P160. The P160, in particular, was highly competitive during the 1971 season; drivers Pedro Rodríguez and Jo Siffert often ran near the front of the field, only for poor reliability to let them down before the finish. Continued development work reaped vast improvements. In the latter half of the season Siffert and Peter Gethin (who had replaced Rodríguez following the latter's death) won consecutive victories in the Austrian and Italian Grands Prix. Gethin's victory at Monza was taken at an average speed of over 150 mph (240 km/h) and stood as the fastest ever Grand Prix win for over 30 years.

Although the BRM team finished second in the Constructors' Championship standings the end of the season, the achievement was marred by Siffert's death in a non-Championship race at Brands Hatch. Southgate's 1972 design, the BRM P180, was not as competitive as the previous model. Siffert's replacement Jean-Pierre Beltoise managed to win a rain-hit Monaco Grand Prix in the older P160, and with it take BRM's final Formula One victory. During the 1972 season BRM and Tony Southgate parted company. BRM finished the season in seventh place.

== CanAm and Formula One with Shadow ==
At the end of 1972 Shadow Racing Cars founder Don Nichols approached Southgate to design a Formula One car for his team to enter in the 1973 World Championship. Shadow had already been involved in the CanAm sportscar series for nearly two years, and with UOP sponsorship Nichols was planning an entrance into Formula One. Southgate designed and built the first Shadow Formula One prototype, the Shadow DN1, in his own garage in Lincolnshire, where he had moved to be closer to the BRM factory in Bourne. However, production was soon shifted to the US, to where Southgate once again relocated.

Drivers George Follmer and Jackie Oliver were immediately competitive in the DN1. In 1974 the Southgate-designed Shadow DN4 earned first and second in the CanAm championship. In the same year Peter Revson died while testing the Shadow DN3 at Kyalami.

Tony Southgate designed the Shadow DN5 for the 1975 Formula One season. The car proved very fast, with Jean-Pierre Jarier and Tom Pryce both winning pole positions during the year, however it had poor reliability, often retiring when in a points scoring position.

== Lotus ==
At the end of 1975 the withdrawal of Shadow's main sponsor UOP prompted Southgate to move to Lotus, where he worked alongside Peter Wright on the Lotus 77 and Lotus 78 until the middle of 1977.

== Shadow again and Arrows ==
After Lotus, Southgate returned to Shadow, but left the team again at the end of 1977 together with Franco Ambrosio, Alan Rees, Jackie Oliver and Dave Wass to form Arrows.

Arrows' first car, the FA1, was almost identical to the Shadow DN9, which Southgate had designed while at Shadow. The FA1 was comfortably leading its second race, the South African Grand Prix, at the hands of Riccardo Patrese, when its engine blew, forcing it to retire. The Shadow team successfully sued Arrows for infringement of its copyrights and the Arrows FA1 was declared illegal in a UK court judgement on 31 July. Southgate had anticipated this and had completed an alternative design dubbed Arrows A1 which was swiftly produced without Arrows missing a race.

Southgate also designed the Arrows A2 and A3, before leaving the team to work as a freelance engineering consultant.

== Theodore and Osella ==
Southgate returned to Formula 1 towards the end of 1980 to design Theodore Racing's TY01 to race in the 1981 season.

When Theodore was merged into Ensign at the end of 1982, Southgate and John Thompson founded a design consultancy named Auto Racing Technology, that worked for Ford on two major projects, including development of the Ford RS200.

In 1983 Southgate designed his last Formula 1 car, the Osella FA1E. The design was severely constrained as Osella Squadra Corse did not have sufficient finances to build an entirely new chassis, forcing Southgate to adapt some parts (gearbox and rear suspension) of the Alfa Romeo 182 of previous year to fit an engine from Alfa Romeo.

== Sports cars ==
After the experience on Can-Am cars with Shadow, Southgate collaborated with Ford in 1982–83. with the goal to improve the C100. Helped by John Thompson, realized the MkII version that raced in last races of 1982, then realized the new Mk III, but in March 1983, Ford cancelled its activity in sports cars, after the first tests made at Paul Ricard Circuit.

After the work on Ford RS200, in 1984 Southgate moved to Tom Walkinshaw Racing, where he headed the design of the Jaguar XJR-9 and XJR-12. These won the World Sportscar Championship three times and the Le Mans 24 hour race twice. The XJR-9 also raced in North America in the IMSA GT Championship. It won on its debut at the 24 Hours of Daytona in 1988, and in the final race of the season at Del Mar.

He remained at TWR until 1990. Southgate subsequently worked on sports cars for Toyota (Toyota TS010 1991–93), Ferrari (Ferrari 333 SP 1993–95), Lister, Nissan (Nissan R390 GT1 1996–97) and Audi (Audi R8R and R8C).
