= 1975 United States Grand Prix =

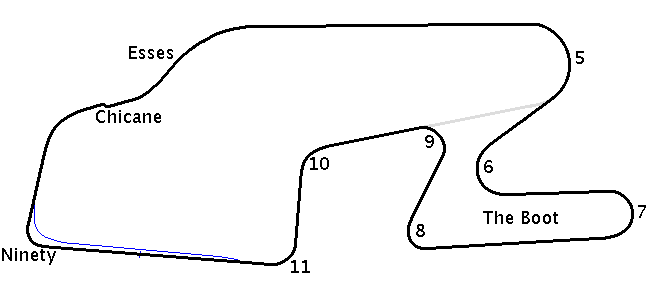

Race details
- Date: October 5, 1975
- Official name: XVIII United States Grand Prix
- Location: Watkins Glen Grand Prix Race Course; Watkins Glen, New York
- Course: Permanent road course
- Course length: 5.435 km (3.377 miles)
- Distance: 59 laps, 320.67 km (199.24 miles)
- Weather: Partly sunny with temperatures reaching a maximum of 20.6 °C (69.1 °F); Winds gusting up to 31.48 km/h (19.56 mph)

Pole position
Driver	(Austria) Niki Lauda	Ferrari
- Time: 1:42.003

Fastest lap
Driver	(Brazil) Emerson Fittipaldi	McLaren-Ford
- Time: 1:43.374 on lap 43

Podium
First	(Austria) Niki Lauda	Ferrari
Second	(Brazil) Emerson Fittipaldi	McLaren-Ford
Third	(West Germany) Jochen Mass	McLaren-Ford

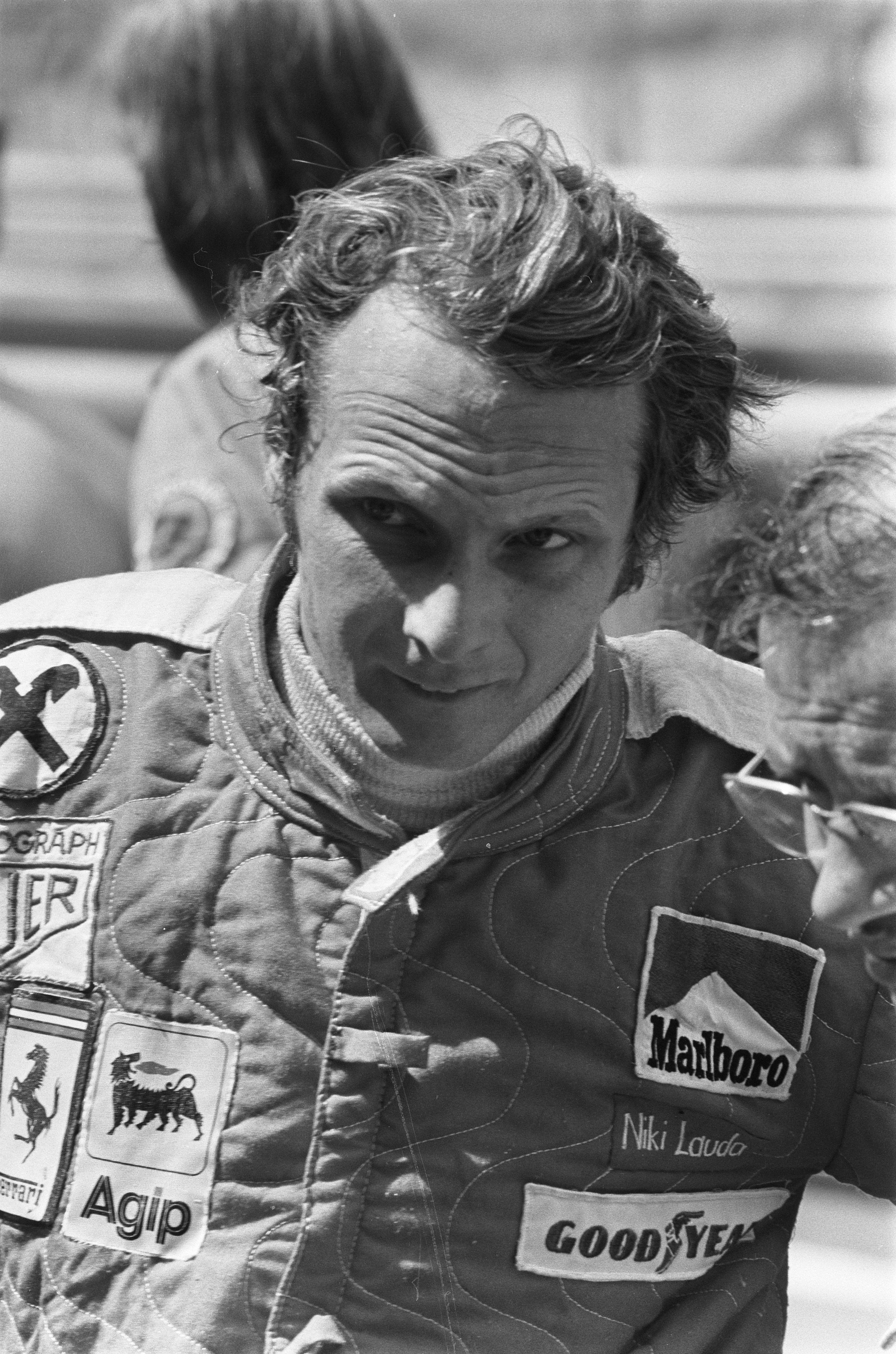
Niki Lauda won the race for Ferrari.

The 1975 United States Grand Prix was a Formula One motor race held on October 5, 1975, at the Watkins Glen Grand Prix Race Course in Watkins Glen, New York. It was race 14 of 14 in both the 1975 World Championship of Drivers and the 1975 International Cup for Formula One Manufacturers. It was the 25th United States Grand Prix since the first American Grand Prize was held in 1908 and the 18th since the first United States Grand Prix at Riverside in 1958.

The race was won by the new world champion, Austrian driver Niki Lauda driving a Ferrari 312T. Lauda took his fifth win for the season by a four-second margin over outgoing world champion, Brazilian Emerson Fittipaldi in a McLaren M23. Fittipaldi's West German teammate Jochen Mass finished third. The second place allowed Fittipaldi to confirm runner's up position in the points race after a half-season long battle with Argentine Brabham driver Carlos Reutemann, although Fittipaldi's McLaren team would fall one point short of overhauling Brabham in the Constructors battle to be second behind Ferrari.

== Background ==
Ferrari had already taken eight poles, five wins, the Drivers' Championship and the Constructors' Championship in 1975, but had never won the United States Grand Prix. Nor had any driver ever won the American race in the year he claimed the title up to this point.

== Canadian controversy ==
There was controversy before practice began. The Canadian Grand Prix had been cancelled and the organizers had arrived in the paddock with a writ to freeze the prize money over legal wrangles. There were also disputes with the Grand Prix Drivers' Association over transfer fees and wages.

== Circuit changes ==
The track had been modified for this race by the addition of the "Scheckter chicane" at the bottom of the hill entering the esses. After François Cevert's fatal crash there two years earlier, the corner was deemed to be too fast. Named for the Tyrrell driver who suggested it, the chicane was expected to add nearly five seconds to the lap times.

== Qualifying summary ==
Mark Donohue had been fatally injured in practice for the Austrian Grand Prix, and John Watson had replaced Donohue on the Penske team. Penske fielded the brand new PC3 for Watson, Although bearing the Penske name The Englishman used the car in practice, but due to a technical failure was forced to switch to the old PC1, which was in the paddock as a demonstrator, for the race. Lauda was quickest from the start, as the drivers got accustomed to the new layout. Vittorio Brambilla briefly registered in with quickest time on Friday, just one hundredth of a second better than Lauda. Lauda's engine developed a vibration, but the Austrian used the spare car to beat the March's time by almost a second. On Saturday, it was Emerson Fittipaldi who briefly held the pole at 1:42.360, but Lauda answered his challenge as well, ending the discussion at 1:42.003. Carlos Reutemann, Jean-Pierre Jarier, Mario Andretti and Brambilla took the rest of the top six positions on the grid.

== Race summary ==
On race day, Watson's Penske suffered electrical problems in the morning warmup. As he was being towed in, the crew retrieved the display car from the First National Citibank podium in the paddock and prepared it to enter the race. Lella Lombardi's Williams suffered an electrical failure, and her teammate Jacques Laffite was unable to race after mistaking visor cleaning fluid for his eyedrops. Lombardi tried to use Laffite's car, but she didn't fit.

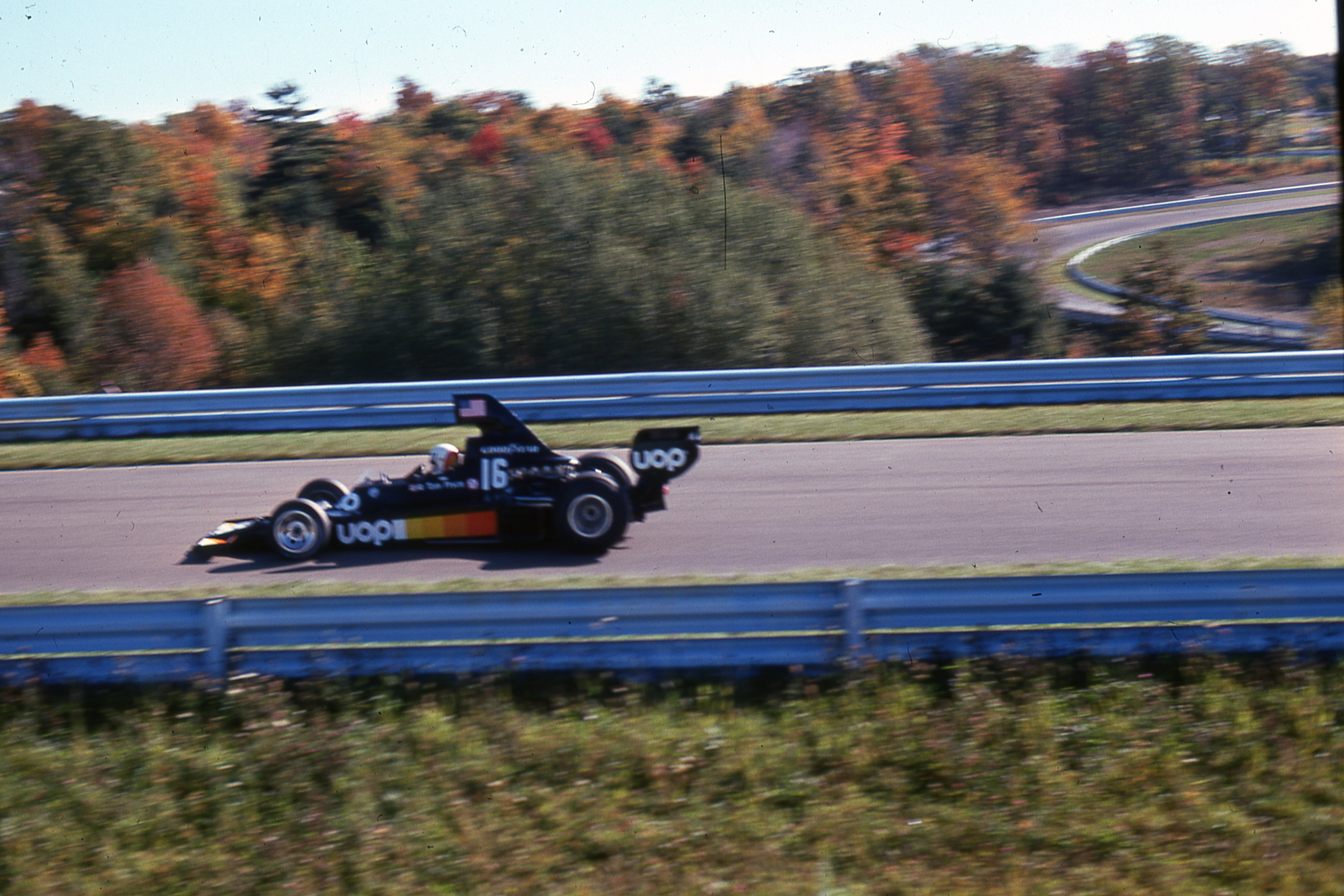
Tom Pryce in a Shadow DN5 during the race.

Lauda led the field away from the grid and through the new chicane for the first time, followed by Fittipaldi, Jarier, Brambilla, Reutemann and Andretti. Carlos Pace and Patrick Depailler collided on lap 2, both retiring from the race as a result.

The gap between Lauda's Ferrari and Fittipaldi's McLaren settled at about one second. Mass, who had moved up to sixth, suddenly lost three places to Andretti, James Hunt, and Ronnie Peterson when he accidentally switched off his engine. On the next lap, with Mass now immediately in front of him, Clay Regazzoni smashed his nose against the rear wheel of the McLaren and lost more than a lap as he pitted for a new one. On lap 10, Reutemann's engine expired and Andretti's front suspension collapsed. This left Lauda and Fittipaldi twelve seconds ahead of Jarier, who was five seconds clear of a group containing Hunt, Brambilla, Mass, Peterson and Scheckter.

Lauda's teammate Regazzoni was caught by the leaders on lap 18, after his lengthy pit stop. He let Lauda by, but held up Fittipaldi for six laps, despite blue flags being waved to indicate that he should be let through. Eventually Regazzoni was black flagged and brought in for a warning on lap 24; Ferrari manager Luca di Montezemolo instructed Regazzoni to continue the race, but withdrew him from the race in protest just after four laps.

Back on the track, Fittipaldi was now 15 seconds behind Lauda, Jarier had retired with a seized rear wheel bearing, Brambilla dropped back to seventh suffering from loose seat supports, and Hunt, Mass, Peterson and Scheckter were battling for third. Mass overtook Hunt on lap 33. With nine laps to go, Peterson also passed Hunt, who was struggling with his gear selection and brake balance. Three laps from the finish, Mass's brakes began to fade, and Peterson closed, but locked up his left front tire under braking. The resulting flat spot slowed him enough for Hunt to retake fourth on the last lap. Lauda took the win by just under five seconds.

This was the final race for Wilson Fittipaldi Júnior (who began to dedicate himself entirely to the management of Fittipaldi's team since them), Tony Brise and Embassy Racing with Graham Hill. On the evening of 29 November 1975, double-world champion Graham Hill was piloting a Piper Aztec light aircraft from France to London. His passengers were team manager Ray Brimble, driver Tony Brise, designer Andy Smallman and mechanics Terry Richards and Tony Alcock. They were returning from Circuit Paul Ricard where they had been testing the GH2 car being prepared for 1976. They were due to land at Elstree airfield before onward travel to London to attend a party. Shortly before 10pm, the plane hit trees beside a golf course at Arkley in thick fog. In the ensuing crash and explosion, everyone on board was killed. As the team now only consisted of the deputy team manager and two mechanics, it was impossible to continue, and so the team was closed down.

== Classification ==
=== Qualifying ===
Pos.	Driver	Constructor	Time/Gap
1	(Austria) Niki Lauda	Ferrari	1:42.003
2	(Brazil) Emerson Fittipaldi	McLaren–Ford	+0.357
3	(Argentina) Carlos Reutemann	Brabham–Ford	+0.682
4	(France) Jean-Pierre Jarier	Shadow–Ford	+0.756
5	(United States) Mario Andretti	Parnelli–Ford	+0.819
6	(Italy) Vittorio Brambilla	March–Ford	+0.843
7	(United Kingdom) Tom Pryce	Shadow–Ford	+0.957
8	(France) Patrick Depailler	Tyrrell–Ford	+1.029
9	(West Germany) Jochen Mass	McLaren–Ford	+1.097
10	(South Africa) Jody Scheckter	Tyrrell–Ford	+1.124
11	(Switzerland) Clay Regazzoni	Ferrari	+1.243
12	(United Kingdom) John Watson	Penske–Ford	+1.307
13	(West Germany) Hans-Joachim Stuck	March–Ford	+1.414
14	(Sweden) Ronnie Peterson	Lotus–Ford	+1.567
15	(United Kingdom) James Hunt	Hesketh–Ford	+1.817
16	(Brazil) Carlos Pace	Brabham–Ford	+2.051
17	(United Kingdom) Tony Brise	Hill–Ford	+2.061
18	(United States) Brett Lunger	Hesketh–Ford	+3.233
19	(United Kingdom) Brian Henton	Lotus–Ford	+3.241
20	(France) Michel Leclère	Tyrrell–Ford	+4.020
21	(France) Jacques Laffite	Williams–Ford	+4.029
22	(Netherlands) Roelof Wunderink	Ensign–Ford	+5.221
23	(Brazil) Wilson Fittipaldi	Fittipaldi–Ford	+6.223
24	(Italy) Lella Lombardi	Williams–Ford	+7.731

=== Race ===
Pos	No	Driver	Constructor	Laps	Time/Retired	Grid	Points
1	12	(Austria) Niki Lauda	Ferrari	59	1:42:58.175	1	9
2	1	(Brazil) Emerson Fittipaldi	McLaren-Ford	59	+ 4.943	2	6
3	2	(West Germany) Jochen Mass	McLaren-Ford	59	+ 47.637	9	4
4	24	(United Kingdom) James Hunt	Hesketh-Ford	59	+ 49.475	15	3
5	5	(Sweden) Ronnie Peterson	Lotus-Ford	59	+ 49.986	14	2
6	3	(South Africa) Jody Scheckter	Tyrrell-Ford	59	+ 50.321	10	1
7	9	(Italy) Vittorio Brambilla	March-Ford	59	+ 1:44.031	6	
8	10	(West Germany) Hans-Joachim Stuck	March-Ford	58	+ 1 lap	13	
9	28	(United Kingdom) John Watson	Penske-Ford	57	+ 2 laps	12	
10	30	(Brazil) Wilson Fittipaldi	Fittipaldi-Ford	55	+ 4 laps	23	
NC	16	(United Kingdom) Tom Pryce	Shadow-Ford	52	+ 7 laps	7	
NC	6	(United Kingdom) Brian Henton	Lotus-Ford	49	+ 10 laps	19	
Ret	25	(United States) Brett Lunger	Hesketh-Ford	46	Accident	18	
Ret	31	(Netherlands) Roelof Wunderink	Ensign-Ford	41	Gearbox	22	
WD	11	(Switzerland) Clay Regazzoni	Ferrari	28	Black flag	11	
Ret	17	(France) Jean-Pierre Jarier	Shadow-Ford	19	Wheel bearing	4	
Ret	7	(Argentina) Carlos Reutemann	Brabham-Ford	9	Engine	3	
Ret	27	(United States) Mario Andretti	Parnelli-Ford	9	Suspension	5	
Ret	23	(United Kingdom) Tony Brise	Hill-Ford	5	Accident	17	
Ret	15	(France) Michel Leclère	Tyrrell-Ford	5	Engine	20	
Ret	4	(France) Patrick Depailler	Tyrrell-Ford	2	Accident	8	
Ret	8	(Brazil) Carlos Pace	Brabham-Ford	2	Accident	16	
DNS	21	(France) Jacques Laffite	Williams-Ford		Physical	21	
DNS	20	(Italy) Lella Lombardi	Williams-Ford		Ignition	24	

== Notes ==
- This was the Formula One World Championship debut for French driver Michel Leclère.
- This was the 10th Grand Prix start for British constructor Hill.
- This was the 58th Grand Prix victory for Ferrari, breaking the record set by Lotus at the 1974 Italian Grand Prix.

== Final Championship standings ==
Drivers' Championship standings

Pos	Driver	Points
1	(Austria) **Niki Lauda***	64.5
2	(Brazil) Emerson Fittipaldi	45
3	(Argentina) Carlos Reutemann	37
4	(United Kingdom) James Hunt	33
5	(Switzerland) Clay Regazzoni	25

Constructors' Championship standings

Pos	Constructor	Points
1	(Italy) **Ferrari***	72.5
2	(United Kingdom) Brabham-Ford	54 (56)
3	(United Kingdom) McLaren-Ford	53
4	(United Kingdom) Hesketh-Ford	33
5	(United Kingdom) Tyrrell-Ford	25

- Note: Only the top five positions are included for both sets of standings. Only the best 6 results from the first 7 races and the best 6 results from the last 7 races counted towards the Championship. Numbers without parentheses are Championship points; numbers in parentheses are total points scored.
- Competitors in bold and marked with an asterisk are the 1975 World Champions.

Previous race: 1975 Italian Grand Prix	FIA Formula One World Championship; 1975 season	Next race: 1976 Brazilian Grand Prix
Previous race: 1974 United States Grand Prix	United States Grand Prix	Next race: 1976 United States Grand Prix
