= 1975 Brazilian Grand Prix =

Race details
- Date: January 26, 1975
- Location: São Paulo, Brazil
- Course: Permanent race track
- Course length: 7.960 km (4.946 miles)
- Distance: 40 laps, 318.400 km (197.845 miles)
- Weather: Sunny, hot and dry

Pole position
Driver	(France) Jean-Pierre Jarier	Shadow-Ford
- Time: 2:29.88

Fastest lap
Driver	(France) Jean-Pierre Jarier	Shadow-Ford
- Time: 2:34.16 on lap 10

Podium
First	(Brazil) Carlos Pace	Brabham-Ford
Second	(Brazil) Emerson Fittipaldi	McLaren-Ford
Third	(West Germany) Jochen Mass	McLaren-Ford

The 1975 Brazilian Grand Prix was a Formula One motor race held at Interlagos on 26 January 1975. It was race 2 of 14 in both the 1975 World Championship of Drivers and the 1975 International Cup for Formula One Manufacturers. It was the fourth Brazilian Grand Prix since its introduction in 1972. The race was won by São Paulo native Carlos Pace driving a Brabham BT44B. It was the only win of Pace's career; he was killed in an aircraft accident two years later. Fellow Brazilian Emerson Fittipaldi finished second in his McLaren M23 with his German teammate Jochen Mass finishing third.

== Qualifying ==
=== Qualifying classification ===
Pos.	No.	Driver	Constructor	Time	Gap
1	17	(France) Jean-Pierre Jarier	Shadow-Ford	2:29.88	—
2	1	(Brazil) Emerson Fittipaldi	McLaren-Ford	2:30.68	+0.80
3	7	(Argentina) Carlos Reutemann	Brabham-Ford	2:31.00	+1.12
4	12	(Austria) Niki Lauda	Ferrari	2:31.12	+1.24
5	11	(Switzerland) Clay Regazzoni	Ferrari	2:31.22	+1.34
6	8	(Brazil) Carlos Pace	Brabham-Ford	2:31.58	+1.70
7	24	(United Kingdom) James Hunt	Hesketh-Ford	2:31.70	+1.82
8	3	(South Africa) Jody Scheckter	Tyrrell-Ford	2:31.74	+1.86
9	4	(France) Patrick Depailler	Tyrrell-Ford	2:32.94	+3.06
10	2	(West Germany) Jochen Mass	McLaren-Ford	2:33.06	+3.18
11	20	(Italy) Arturo Merzario	Williams-Ford	2:33.16	+3.28
12	6	(Belgium) Jacky Ickx	Lotus-Ford	2:33.20	+3.32
13	18	(United Kingdom) John Watson	Surtees-Ford	2:33.23	+3.35
14	16	(United Kingdom) Tom Pryce	Shadow-Ford	2:33.24	+3.36
15	28	(United States) Mark Donohue	Penske-Ford	2:33.33	+3.45
16	5	(Sweden) Ronnie Peterson	Lotus-Ford	2:33.90	+4.02
17	9	(Italy) Vittorio Brambilla	March-Ford	2:34.44	+4.56
18	27	(United States) Mario Andretti	Parnelli-Ford	2:34.56	+4.68
19	21	(France) Jacques Laffite	Williams-Ford	2:34.76	+4.88
20	22	(United Kingdom) Graham Hill	Lola-Ford	2:35.49	+5.61
21	30	(Brazil) Wilson Fittipaldi	Fittipaldi-Ford	2:36.47	+6.59
22	14	(United Kingdom) Mike Wilds	BRM	2:37.15	+7.27
23	23	(West Germany) Rolf Stommelen	Lola-Ford	2:38.05	+8.17

== Race summary ==
Jean-Pierre Jarier took pole position, after beating the 1973 pole record. He lined up ahead of local driver Emerson Fittipaldi. The race was delayed whilst the track was washed down to remove debris – punctures had played a critical part in the 1974 race and race organisers wanted to avoid a repeat of these problems.

This was the 176th and last championship race start of Graham Hill's Formula One career.

Brazilian drivers finished 1–2 in the race (for first time in the history of the category), with Carlos Pace taking the only win of his career and Emerson Fittipaldi finishing second. A local 1–2 also occurred in the 1986 Brazilian Grand Prix with Nelson Piquet winning from Ayrton Senna.

== Race classification ==
Pos	No	Driver	Constructor	Laps	Time/Retired	Grid	Points
1	8	(Brazil) Carlos Pace	Brabham-Ford	40	1:44:41.17	6	9
2	1	(Brazil) Emerson Fittipaldi	McLaren-Ford	40	+ 5.79	2	6
3	2	(Germany) Jochen Mass	McLaren-Ford	40	+ 26.66	10	4
4	11	(Switzerland) Clay Regazzoni	Ferrari	40	+ 43.28	5	3
5	12	(Austria) Niki Lauda	Ferrari	40	+ 1:01.88	4	2
6	24	(United Kingdom) James Hunt	Hesketh-Ford	40	+ 1:05.12	7	1
7	27	(United States) Mario Andretti	Parnelli-Ford	40	+ 1:06.81	18	
8	7	(Argentina) Carlos Reutemann	Brabham-Ford	40	+ 1:39.62	3	
9	6	(Belgium) Jacky Ickx	Lotus-Ford	40	+ 1:51.84	12	
10	18	(United Kingdom) John Watson	Surtees-Ford	40	+ 2:29.60	13	
11	21	(France) Jacques Laffite	Williams-Ford	39	+ 1 Lap	19	
12	22	(United Kingdom) Graham Hill	Lola-Ford	39	+ 1 Lap	20	
13	30	(Brazil) Wilson Fittipaldi	Fittipaldi-Ford	39	+ 1 Lap	21	
14	23	(Germany) Rolf Stommelen	Lola-Ford	39	+ 1 Lap	23	
15	5	(Sweden) Ronnie Peterson	Lotus-Ford	38	+ 2 laps	16	
Ret	17	(France) Jean-Pierre Jarier	Shadow-Ford	32	Fuel System	1	
Ret	4	(France) Patrick Depailler	Tyrrell-Ford	31	Suspension	9	
Ret	16	(United Kingdom) Tom Pryce	Shadow-Ford	31	Accident	14	
Ret	20	(Italy) Arturo Merzario	Williams-Ford	24	Fuel System	11	
Ret	28	(United States) Mark Donohue	Penske-Ford	22	Handling	15	
Ret	14	(United Kingdom) Mike Wilds	BRM	22	Electrical	22	
Ret	3	(South Africa) Jody Scheckter	Tyrrell-Ford	18	Oil leak	8	
Ret	9	(Italy) Vittorio Brambilla	March-Ford	1	Engine	17	
WD	29	(Argentina) Nestor García-Veiga	Berta-Ford		Withdrew		

== Notes ==
- This was the first fastest lap set by a Shadow.

== Championship standings after the race ==
Drivers' Championship standings

	Pos	Driver	Points
	1	(Brazil) Emerson Fittipaldi	15
13	2	(Brazil) Carlos Pace	9
1	3	(United Kingdom) James Hunt	7
	4	(Switzerland) Clay Regazzoni	6
2	5	(Argentina) Carlos Reutemann	4

Constructors' Championship standings

	Pos	Constructor	Points
	1	(United Kingdom) McLaren-Ford	15
1	2	(United Kingdom) Brabham-Ford	13
1	3	(United Kingdom) Hesketh-Ford	7
	4	(Italy) Ferrari	6
	5	(United Kingdom) Tyrrell-Ford	2

- Note: Only the top five positions are included for both sets of standings.

Previous race: 1975 Argentine Grand Prix	FIA Formula One World Championship; 1975 season	Next race: 1975 South African Grand Prix
Previous race: 1974 Brazilian Grand Prix	Brazilian Grand Prix	Next race: 1976 Brazilian Grand Prix
