= 2021 Historic Grand Prix of Monaco =

← Previous race	Next race →
- Circuit de Monaco

Race details
- Date: 24–25 April 2021
- Official name: 12e Grand Prix de Monaco Historique
- Location: Circuit de Monaco
- Course: Street circuit
- Course length: 3.337 km (2.074 miles)

2021 Historic Grand Prix of Monaco was the twelfth running of the Historic Grand Prix of Monaco, a motor racing event for heritage Grand Prix, Voiturettes, Formula One, Formula Two and Sports cars.

The event was originally scheduled to take place in 2020 but was postponed due to the COVID-19 pandemic.

== Summary ==
Série	Cars	Years	Pole position		Fastest lap		Race winner
A	Voiturettes and Grand Prix	Pre-war	(United Kingdom) Patrick Blakeney-Edwards	2:09.087	(United Kingdom) Patrick Blakeney-Edwards	2:11.679	(Switzerland) Christian Traber
B	Formula 1 and Formula 2	Pre-1961	(Spain) Guillermo Fierro-Eleta	1:56.127	(Spain) Guillermo Fierro-Eleta	1:57.109	(Spain) Guillermo Fierro-Eleta
C	Sports cars - front engine	1952–1957	(Spain) Guillermo Fierro-Eleta	2:03.002	(Spain) Guillermo Fierro-Eleta	2:02.190	(Spain) Guillermo Fierro-Eleta
D	Formula 1 – 1500 cm^{3}	1961–1965	(United Kingdom) Mark Shaw	1:53.121	(United Kingdom) Mark Shaw	1:54.902	(United Kingdom) Mark Shaw
E	Formula 1 - 3 litre	1966–1972	(United Kingdom) Stuart Hall	1:34.087	(United Kingdom) Stuart Hall	1:34.468	(United Kingdom) Michael Lyons
F	Formula 1 - 3 litre	1973–1976	(Germany) Marco Werner	1:31.261	(France) Jean Alesi	1:32.122	(United Kingdom) Michael Lyons
G	Formula 1 - 3 litre	1977–1980	(South Africa) Jordan Grogor	1:31.417	(United Kingdom) Mike Cantillon	1:31.806	(United Kingdom) Michael Lyons

== Series A ==
Series A featured Pre-war Grand Prix cars and Voiturettes.

=== Qualifying ===
Pos	Driver	Car	Time/Gap
1	(United Kingdom) Patrick Blakeney-Edwards	Frazer Nash Monoplace	2:09.087
2	(Switzerland) Christian Traber	Talbot-Lago T150C	+2.097
3	(Austria) Niklas Halusa	Bugatti Type 35	+4.254
4	(United Kingdom) Ewen Sergison	Maserati 6CM	+5.341
5	(France) Thierry Chanoine	Riley Dobbs	+12.734
6	(Italy) Luigi Moccia	Maserati 4CM	+13.688
7	(Netherlands) Ivo Noteboom	Maserati 6CM	+21.310
8	(France) Paul Emile Bessade	Delage 15OO	+24.260
9	(Germany) Nicola von Dönhoff	Bugatti Type 51	+24.617
10	(Netherlands) Lucas Slijpen	Amilcar C6	+27.268
11	(France) François Fouquet-Hatevilan	Bugatti Type 35	+29.627
12	(United Kingdom) Julia Villalba de Baldanza	Bugatti Type 35	+31.380
13	(Belgium) Maxime Castelein	Mercedes-Benz SSK	+39.327

=== Race ===
Pos	Driver	Car	Laps	Time/Gap
1	(Switzerland) Christian Traber	Talbot-Lago T150C	10	22:38.823
2	(Austria) Niklas Halusa	Bugatti Type 35	10	+25.382
3	(United Kingdom) Ewen Sergison	Maserati 6CM	10	+1:24.853
4	(France) Thierry Chanoine	Riley Dobbs	10	+1:39.285
5	(France) Paul Emile Bessade	Delage 15OO	9	+1 lap
6	(Germany) Nicola von Dönhoff	Bugatti Type 51	9	+1 lap
7	(United Kingdom) Julia Villalba de Baldanza	Bugatti Type 35	9	+1 lap
8	(Netherlands) Lucas Slijpen	Amilcar C6	9	+1 lap
9	(France) François Fouquet-Hatevilan	Bugatti Type 35	9	+1 lap
10	(Belgium) Maxime Castelein	Mercedes-Benz SSK	8	+2 laps
11	(United Kingdom) Patrick Blakeney-Edwards	Frazer Nash Monoplace	5	+5 laps
12	(Italy) Luigi Moccia	Maserati 4CM	2	+8 laps
13	(Netherlands) Ivo Noteboom	Maserati 6CM	0	+10 laps

== Series B ==
Series B featured pre-1961 Formula One and Formula Two cars.

=== Qualifying ===
Pos	Driver	Car	Time/Gap
1	(Spain) Guillermo Fierro-Eleta	Maserati 250F	1:56.127
2	(United Kingdom) Max Smith-Hilliard	Lotus 16	+1.424
3	(Austria) Martin Halusa	Maserati 250F	+10.297
4	(Germany) Alex Birkenstock	Ferrari 246	+11.039
5	(Germany) Klaus Lehr	Talbot-Lago T26C	+15.850
6	(France) Jean-Jacques Bally	Gordini T11/15	+21.598
7	(Spain) Jaime Bergel Sainz de Baranda	Maserati 4CLT	+30.792
8	(United Kingdom) Julia Villalba de Baldanza	Maserati A6GCM	+39.018

=== Race ===
Pos	Driver	Car	Laps	Time/Gap
1	(Spain) Guillermo Fierro-Eleta	Maserati 250F	10	20:42.041
2	(United Kingdom) Max Smith-Hilliard	Lotus 16	10	+19.794
3	(Germany) Alex Birkenstock	Ferrari 246	10	+21.958
4	(Austria) Martin Halusa	Maserati 250F	10	+1:03.949
5	(Germany) Klaus Lehr	Talbot-Lago T26C	10	+1:27.776
6	(United Kingdom) Julia Villalba de Baldanza	Maserati A6GCM	9	+1 lap
7	(France) Jean-Jacques Bally	Gordini T11/15	9	+1 lap
DNS	(Spain) Jaime Bergel Sainz de Baranda	Maserati 4CLT	0	

== Series C ==
Series C featured front-engined sports racing cars built between 1952 and 1957

=== Qualifying ===
Pos	Driver	Car	Time/Gap
1	(Spain) Guillermo Fierro-Eleta	Maserati 300S	2:03.002
2	(Netherlands) David Hart	Maserati 300S	+1.490
3	(Austria) Niklas Halusa	Jaguar D-Type	+1.615
4	(Germany) Katarina Kvyalova	Cooper-Jaguar T33 Mk.1	+9.744
5	(Netherlands) Michiel van Duijvendijk	Maserati A6GCS	+10.825
6	(United Kingdom) Stephen Bond	Lister Flat Iron	+10.853
7	(Germany) Wolfgang Friedrichs	Aston Martin DB3S	+11.069
8	(Germany) Ulrich Schumacher	Maserati A6GCS	+11.347
9	(France) Jean-Jacques Bally	Maserati A6GCS	+12.424
10	(Belgium) Nicolas Bert	Jaguar C-Type	+13.484
11	(Germany) Lutz Rathenlow	Veritas RS2000	+16.940
12	(Germany) Albert Otten	Kieft Sport	+18.523
13	(Germany) Stefan Hamelmann	Maserati A6GCS	+19.357
14	(France) Pierre Macchi	Frazer Nash Le Mans Coupé	+30.550
15	(United States) David Graus	Frazer Nash Targa Florio	+35.628
16	(France) Antoine Blasco Montanel	O.S.C.A. S1500	+41.164
WD	(Austria) Martin Halusa	Maserati 300S	No time

=== Race ===
Pos	Driver	Car	Laps	Time/Gap
1	(Spain) Guillermo Fierro-Eleta	Maserati 300S	10	20:48.586
2	(Austria) Niklas Halusa	Jaguar D-Type	10	+4.857
3	(Belgium) Nicolas Bert	Jaguar C-Type	10	+1:28.172
4	(Germany) Ulrich Schumacher	Maserati A6GCS	10	+1:29.748
5	(Germany) Katarina Kvyalova	Cooper-Jaguar T33 Mk.1	10	+1:39.319
6	(Netherlands) Michiel van Duijvendijk	Maserati A6GCS	10	+1:40.365
7	(United Kingdom) Stephen Bond	Lister Flat Iron	10	+1:57.337
8	(Germany) Wolfgang Friedrichs	Aston Martin DB3S	10	+2:13.190
9	(Germany) Albert Otten	Kieft Sport	9	+1 lap
10	(Germany) Lutz Rathenlow	Veritas RS2000	9	+1 lap
11	(France) Pierre Macchi	Frazer Nash Le Mans Coupé	9	+1 lap
12	(France) Jean-Jacques Bally	Maserati A6GCS	5	+5 laps
13	(United States) David Graus	Frazer Nash Targa Florio	4	+6 laps
14	(France) Antoine Blasco Montanel	O.S.C.A. S1500	3	+7 laps
15	(Netherlands) David Hart	Maserati 300S	1	+9 laps
DNS	(Germany) Stefan Hamelmann	Maserati A6GCS	0	

== Series D ==
Series D featured Formula One cars of 1500cc engine capacity built between 1961 and 1965.

=== Qualifying ===
Pos	Driver	Car	Time/Gap
1	(United Kingdom) Mark Shaw	Lotus 21	1:53.121
2	(United Kingdom) Nick Taylor	Lotus 18	+1.933
3	(France) Philippe Bonny	Brabham BT2	+7.618
4	(Switzerland) Philipp Buhofer	Lotus 24	+10.141
5	(Switzerland) Stephan Jöbstl	Lotus 24	+10.265
6	(United Kingdom) James Timms	Cooper T53	+11.529
7	(Germany) Albert Streminski	Emeryson	+15.384
WD	(France) "John of B"	Lola Mk.4	

=== Race ===
Pos	Driver	Car	Laps	Time/Gap
1	(United Kingdom) Mark Shaw	Lotus 21	10	19:23.946
2	(United Kingdom) Nick Taylor	Lotus 18	10	+12.930
3	(Switzerland) Philipp Buhofer	Lotus 24	10	+57.029
4	(Switzerland) Stephan Jöbstl	Lotus 24	10	+1:05.235
5	(France) Philippe Bonny	Brabham BT2	10	+1:05.542
6	(Germany) Albert Streminski	Emeryson	10	+1:14.147
7	(United Kingdom) James Timms	Cooper T53	10	+1:18.393

== Series E ==
Series E featured Formula One cars of 3000cc engine capacity built between 1966 and 1972

=== Qualifying ===
Pos	Driver	Car	Time/Gap
1	(United Kingdom) Stuart Hall	McLaren M19	1:34.087
2	(United Kingdom) Michael Lyons	Surtees TS9	+0.312
3	(United Kingdom) David Shaw	March 721	+1.923
4	(United Kingdom) Jamie Constable	Brabham BT37	+3.714
5	(Italy) Alex Caffi	Ferrari 312	+3.978
6	(Italy) Franco Meiners	Ferrari 312B3	+5.774
7	(United Kingdom) Matthew Wrigley	March 721	+8.366
8	(South Africa) Jordan Grogor	Surtees TS9B	+9.022
9	(Germany) Roald Göthe	McLaren M14A	+9.203
10	(Austria) Jürgen Boden	Ferrari 312B2	+10.609
11	(Switzerland) Michael Gans	Cooper T79	+11.413
12	(France) "John of B"	Matra MS120C	+14.464
13	(France) Nicolas Matile	Matra MS120B	+14.756
WD	(France) Jean-François Decaux	Ferrari 312	No time

=== Race ===
Pos	Driver	Car	Laps	Time/Gap
1	(United Kingdom) Michael Lyons	Surtees TS9	12	19:11.747
2	(United Kingdom) Stuart Hall	McLaren M19	12	+0.722
3	(United Kingdom) Jamie Constable	Brabham BT37	12	+30.544
4	(Germany) Roald Göthe	McLaren M14A	12	+1:40.780
5	(United Kingdom) David Shaw	March 721	11	+1 lap
6	(Switzerland) Michael Gans	Cooper T79	11	+1 lap
7	(France) "John of B"	Matra MS120C	11	+1 lap
8	(Austria) Jürgen Boden	Ferrari 312B2	11	+1 lap
9	(France) Nicolas Matile	Matra MS120B	3	+9 laps
DNS	(Italy) Alex Caffi	Ferrari 312	0	
DNS	(Italy) Franco Meiners	Ferrari 312B3	0	
DNS	(United Kingdom) Matthew Wrigley	March 721	0	
DNS	(South Africa) Jordan Grogor	Surtees TS9B	0	

== Series F ==
Series F featured Formula One cars of 3000cc engine capacity built between 1973 and 1976.

=== Qualifying ===
Pos	Driver	Car	Time/Gap
1	(Germany) Marco Werner	Lotus 77	1:31.261
2	(France) Jean Alesi	Ferrari 312B3	+1.937
3	(United Kingdom) Michael Lyons	McLaren M26	+2.292
4	(France) Julien Andlauer	March 761	+3.071
5	(Austria) Lukas Halusa	McLaren M23	+3.704
6	(United Kingdom) Jamie Constable	Lola T370	+5.191
7	(Switzerland) Jean-Denis Délétraz	Hesketh 308B	+5.602
8	(Germany) Roald Göthe	Tyrrell 007	+9.445
9	(United Kingdom) Stuart Hall	McLaren M23	+9.630
10	(Switzerland) Toni Seiler	Shadow DN1	+11.305
11	(France) René Arnoux	Ferrari 312B3	+12.714
12	(Zimbabwe) Axcil Jefferies	Token RJ02	+13.234
13	(Italy) Piero Lottini	Surtees TS19	+14.315
14	(Australia) Matthew Campbell	Shadow DN5	+16.452
15	(France) Philippe Bonny	Trojan T103	+16.589
16	(United Kingdom) Ewen Sergison	Shadow DN1	+20.158
17	(France) Frederic Fatien	Amon AF101	No time

=== Race ===
Pos	Driver	Car	Laps	Time/Gap
1	(United Kingdom) Michael Lyons	McLaren M26	17	26:48.342
2	(France) Julien Andlauer	March 761	17	+0.321
3	(Germany) Marco Werner	Lotus 77	17	+14.526^{1}
4	(Austria) Lukas Halusa	McLaren M23	16	+1 lap
5	(Zimbabwe) Axcil Jefferies	Token RJ02	16	+1 lap
6	(Switzerland) Jean-Denis Délétraz	Hesketh 308B	16	+1 lap
7	(Germany) Roald Göthe	Tyrrell 007	16	+1 lap
8	(Switzerland) Toni Seiler	Shadow DN1	15	+2 laps
9	(Italy) Piero Lottini	Surtees TS19	15	+2 laps
10	(France) Jean Alesi	Ferrari 312B3	14	Crash
11	(France) Philippe Bonny	Trojan T103	14	+3 laps
12	(United Kingdom) Ewen Sergison	Shadow DN1	14	+3 laps
13	(Australia) Matthew Campbell	Shadow DN5	14	+3 laps
14	(France) Frederic Fatien	Amon AF101	13	+4 laps
15	(United Kingdom) Jamie Constable	Lola T370	4	+13 laps
DNS	(United Kingdom) Stuart Hall	McLaren M23	0	
DNS	(France) René Arnoux	Ferrari 312B3	0	

- ^1 – Werner received a 25-second time penalty for causing a collision.

== Series G ==
Series G featured Formula One cars of 3000cc engine capacity built between 1977 and 1980.

=== Qualifying ===
Pos	Driver	Car	Time/Gap
1	(South Africa) Jordan Grogor	Arrows A3	1:31.417
2	(United Kingdom) Michael Lyons	Hesketh 308E	+0.187
3	(France) Evens Stievenart	Tyrrell 010	+1.938
4	(United Kingdom) Mike Cantillion	Tyrrell 010	+2.475
5	(United Kingdom) Steven Brooks	Lotus 81	+3.421
6	(United Kingdom) Mark Hazell	Williams FW07B	+3.621
7	(United Kingdom) Jamie Constable	Shadow DN8	+3.776
8	(France) Alain Ferté	Arrows A3	+3.805
9	(France) Patrick D'Aubreby	March 761	+4.456
10	(Switzerland) Jean-Denis Délétraz	ATS D4	+4.868
11	(Belgium) Christophe D'Ansembourg	McLaren M26	+4.873
12	(France) Pierre-Brice Mena	Shadow DN8	+5.253
13	(Monaco) Frédéric Lajoux	Arrows A1B	+5.998
14	(Netherlands) Frits van Eerd	Fittipaldi F7	+9.815
15	(France) Bruno Houzelot	Merzario A2	+12.646
16	(United Kingdom) Paul Tattersall	Ensign N179	+13.788
17	(Italy) Luciano Biamino	Ensign N180	+30.059
18	(United Kingdom) Matteo Ferrer-Aza	Ligier JS11	No time
WD	(Switzerland) Tiziano Carugati	ATS D3	No time

=== Race ===
Pos	Driver	Car	Laps	Time/Gap
1	(United Kingdom) Michael Lyons	Hesketh 308E	18	28:29.081
2	(United Kingdom) Mike Cantillion	Tyrrell 010	18	+37.132
3	(United Kingdom) Matteo Ferrer-Aza	Ligier JS11	18	+48.768
4	(United Kingdom) Jamie Constable	Shadow DN8	18	+56.103
5	(United Kingdom) Steven Brooks	Lotus 81	18	+58.357
6	(France) Patrick D'Aubreby	March 761	18	+1:15.785
7	(Monaco) Frédéric Lajoux	Arrows A1B	17	+1 lap
8	(United Kingdom) Paul Tattersall	Ensign N179	17	+1 lap
9	(France) Evens Stievenart	Tyrrell 010	16	+2 laps
10	(France) Alain Ferté	Arrows A3	10	+8 laps
11	(Netherlands) Frits van Eerd	Fittipaldi F7	8	+10 laps
12	(South Africa) Jordan Grogor	Arrows A3	7	+11 laps
13	(United Kingdom) Mark Hazell	Williams FW07B	3	+15 laps
14	(Belgium) Christophe D'Ansembourg	McLaren M26	0	+18 laps
15	(Italy) Luciano Biamino	Ensign N180	0	+18 laps
DNS	(Switzerland) Jean-Denis Délétraz	ATS D4	0	
DNS	(France) Pierre-Brice Mena	Shadow DN8	0	
DNS	(France) Bruno Houzelot	Merzario A2	0	
