= 2018 Historic Grand Prix of Monaco =

← Previous race	Next race →
- Circuit de Monaco

Race details
- Date: 11–13 May 2018
- Official name: 11e Grand Prix de Monaco Historique
- Location: Circuit de Monaco
- Course: Street circuit
- Course length: 3.337 km (2.074 miles)

The 2018 Historic Grand Prix of Monaco was the eleventh running of the Historic Grand Prix of Monaco, a motor racing event for heritage Grand Prix, Voiturettes, Formula One, Formula Two and Sports cars.

== Report ==
Race A was restored to full race status at the request of the drivers, having been held as a demonstration in 2016. The opening ceremony featured a rare appearance by the Lamborghini Marzal concept car, driven by Prince Albert II.

Three parades were held throughout the weekend:

- A motorcycle parade to celebrate the 70th anniversary of the only Motorcycle Grand Prix held at Monaco on 17 May 1948, featuring MotoGP world champion and Monaco resident Wayne Gardner.
- A celebration of the 70th Anniversary of Porsche, featuring Jacky Ickx in his 1981 Le Mans winning Porsche 936, and his daughter Vanina driving a Porsche F1 car.
- An F1 heritage parade, with drivers including John Watson, Emanuele Pirro, Josh Hill (son of Damon), Mika Häkkinen (1998 Monaco winner), Eddie Irvine, Thierry Boutsen, Karun Chandhok and Riccardo Patrese (1982 Monaco winner).

== Results ==
=== Summary ===
Série	Cars	Years	Pole position		Fastest lap		Race winner
A	Grand Prix	Pre-war	(Switzerland) Michael Gans	2:04.301	(Republic of Ireland) Paddins Dowling	2:01.641	(Republic of Ireland) Paddins Dowling
B	Formula 1 and Formula 2	Pre-1961	(United Kingdom) Nick Padmore	1:53.168	(United Kingdom) Nick Padmore	1:53.633	(United Kingdom) Tony Wood
C	Sports cars - front engine	1952-1955	(United Kingdom) Chris Ward	1:59.377	(United Kingdom) Chris Ward	2:18.797	(United Kingdom) Chris Ward
D	Formula 1	1961-1965	(United Kingdom) Andy Middlehurst	1:48.550	(United States) Joe Colasacco	1:48.873	(United Kingdom) Andy Middlehurst
E	Formula 1	1966-1972	(Sweden) Björn Wirdheim	1:34.360	(United Kingdom) Stuart Hall	1:34.295	(Sweden) Björn Wirdheim
F	Formula 1	1973-1976	(United Kingdom) Stuart Hall	1:31.796	(Italy) Alex Caffi	1:50.266	(United Kingdom) Michael Lyons
G	Formula 1	1977-1980	(United Kingdom) Martin O'Connell	1:29.808	(South Africa) Jordan Grogor	1:42.041	(United Kingdom) Martin O'Connell

=== Série A: Pre-war Grand Prix Cars ===
Pos.	No.	Driver	Car	Year	Laps	Time/retired	Grid
1	26	(Republic of Ireland) Paddins Dowling	ERA R5B	1936	10	20:51.995	2
2	22	(Switzerland) Michael Gans	ERA R1B	1935	10	+17.538	1
3	32	(Switzerland) Anthony Sinopoli	Maserati 6CM/4CM	1936	10	+37.670	4
4	24	(United Kingdom) Nicholas Topliss	ERA R4A	1935	10	+39.290	3
5	12	(Austria) Lukas Halusa	Bugatti 35C	1927	10	+1:37.237	5
6	18	(United Kingdom) Terry Crabb	ERA R12C	1937	10	+2:04.712	8
7	34	(Switzerland) Urs Müller	Maserati 6CM	1938	10	+2:05.023	6
8	40	(United Kingdom) Till Bechtolsheimer	Talbot-Lago T150C	1936	9	+1 lap	9
9	28	(United Kingdom) Andrew Hall	Frazer Nash Monoplace	1935	9	+1 lap	10
10	16	(France) Paul-Emile Bessade	Delage 1500	1937	8	+2 laps	12
11	2	(Netherlands) Lucas Slijpen	Amilcar C6	1928	8	+2 laps	14
12	4	(Italy) Maurizio Piantelli	Bugatti 37A	1927	8	+2 laps	13
13	6	(United Kingdom) Robert Lamplough	Bugatti 37	1926	8	+2 laps	16
14	10	(United Kingdom) Julia de Baldanza	Bugatti 35B	1929	8	+2 laps	15
DNS	20	(United States) Chris MacAllister	ERA R14B	1937			
DNS	36	(United Kingdom) Mark Hales	Maserati V8RI	1935			
DNS	42	(Switzerland) Christian Traber	Talbot-Lago T150 "MD"	1939			

=== Série B: Pre-1961 F1 and F2 Grand Prix Cars ===
Pos.	No.	Driver	Car	Year	Laps	Time/retired	Grid
1	48	(United Kingdom) Tony Wood	Tec-Mec F415	1959	9	17:39.995	2
2	30	(United Kingdom) Nick Padmore	Lotus 16	1958	9	+5.962	1
3	34	(Spain) Joaquín Folch-Rusiñol	Lotus 16	1959	9	+16.408	4
4	50	(United Kingdom) Julian Bronson	Scarab F1	1960	9	+17.585	3
5	42	(Spain) Guillermo Fierro-Eleta	Maserati 250F	1954	9	+54.062	6
6	28	(United Kingdom) Max Smith-Hilliard	Lotus 16	1958	9	+1:15.027	5
7	32	(United Kingdom) Marshall Bailey	Lotus 16	1959	9	+1:21.043	7
8	20	(United Kingdom) Ian Nuthall	Alta F2	1952	9	+1:23.483	8
9	56	(Austria) Niklas Halusa	Maserati 250F	1959	9	+1:35.431	10
10	6	(Belgium) Paul Grant	Cooper T23 (Mk2)	1953	9	+1:44.172	12
11	8	(United Kingdom) Steve Russell	Cooper T23 (Mk2)	1953	9	+1:54.317	9
12	44	(United States) Jeffrey O'Neill	Maserati 250F	1957	9	+1:59.573	11
13	22	(United Kingdom) Michael Milligan	Connaught A	1952	8	+1 lap	14
14	2	(United Kingdom) Barry Wood	Cooper T20 (Mk1)	1952	8	+1 lap	18
15	18	(France) Jean-Jacques Bally	Gordini T11/15	1951	8	+1 lap	13
16	14	(Germany) Klaus Lehr	Talbot-Lago T26C	1948	8	+1 lap	15
17	36	(Germany) Alex Birkenstock	Ferrari Dino 246	1960	8	+1 lap	17
18	40	(Belgium) Christian Dumolin	Maserati 250F	1954	8	+1 lap	19
19	38	(United Kingdom) Julia de Baldanza	Maserati A6GCM	1952	7	+2 laps	21
20	16	(France) Eric Leroy	Gordini T11/15	1951	7	+2 laps	22
21	4	(United Kingdom) Eddie McGuire	Cooper T20 (Mk1)	1952	4	+5 laps	23
No lap	10	(United Kingdom) Christopher Phillips	Cooper T23 (Mk2)	1953			20
No lap	24	(Germany) Helmut Gassmann	Connaught B	1955			16

=== Série C: Sports racing cars - front engine (1952–1957) ===
Pos.	No.	Driver	Car	Year	Laps	Time/retired	Grid
1	8	(United Kingdom) Chris Ward	Cooper T33 (Mk1)	1954	10	23:32.080	1
2	44	(United Kingdom) Ben Short	Lister-Maserati	1956	10	+34.064	4
3	42	(United Kingdom) Tony Wood	Lister-Bristol	1954	10	+1:05.645	6
4	14	(United Kingdom) Frederic Wakeman	Cooper T38 (Mk2)	1955	10	+1:21.696	2
5	30	(United Kingdom) Martin Hunt	HWM-Jaguar Sport	1954	10	+1:22.019	3
6	22	(United Kingdom) Patrick Blakeney-Edwards	Frazer Nash Le Mans Replica (Mk2)	1952	10	+1:23.672	8
7	74	(United Kingdom) Gregor Fisken	Maserati 200SI	1955	10	+1:25.125	10
8	16	(United Kingdom) David Franklin	Ferrari 225 S	1952	10	+1:25.916	16
9	52	(Germany) Dieter Roschmann	Maserati 300S	1955	10	+1:48.478	7
10	70	(Argentina) Mathias Sielecki	Maserati A6GCS	1954	10	+2:12.300	18
11	4	(Germany) Wolfgang Friedrichs	Aston Martin DB3S	1954	10	+2:13.268	12
12	66	(France) Jean-Jacques Bally	Maserati A6GCS	1953	10	+2:14.195	15
13	40	(United Kingdom) Stephen Bond	Lister Flat Iron	1955	10	+2:20.733	11
14	10	(Germany) Katarina Kyvalova	Cooper T33 (Mk1)	1954	9	+1 lap	13
15	36	(United States) Jeffrey O'Neill	Jaguar C-Type	1953	9	+1 lap	30
16	60	(Netherlands) Michiel van Duijvendijk	Maserati A6GCS	1952	9	+1 lap	22
17	24	(France) Ralf Emmerling	Frazer Nash Mille Miglia	1951	9	+1 lap	26
18	68	(Argentina) Manuel Eliçabe	Maserati A6GCS	1955	9	+1 lap	20
19	6	(United Kingdom) Paul Griffin	Connaught ALSR	1954	9	+1 lap	31
20	32	(United Kingdom) Nigel Webb	Jaguar C-Type	1952	9	+1 lap	19
21	2	(Switzerland) Arlette Muller	Aston Martin DB3	1952	9	+1 lap	21
22	62	(Germany) Stefan Hamelmann	Maserati A6GCS	1954	9	+1 lap	25
23	50	(Austria) Martin Halusa	Ferrari 212 Export	1951	9	+1 lap	27
24	12	(United States) Najeeb Khan	Cooper T38 (Mk2)	1955	9	+1 lap	24
25	20	(United States) John Breslow	Frazer Nash Le Mans Replica (Mk2)	1952	8	+2 laps	28
26	26	(United States) David Graus	Frazer Nash Targa Florio	1952	8	+2 laps	29
27	28	(United Kingdom) Eddie McGuire	Gordini T23S	1952	4	+6 laps	14
28	54	(Germany) Michael Willms	Maserati 300S	1955	1	+9 laps	9
DNS	58	(Germany) Maximilian Werner	Maserati 300S	1956			
DNS	64	(Germany) Ulrich Schumacher	Maserati A6GCS	1954			
DNS	72	(Germany) Lutz Rathenow	Veritas RS2000	1948			

=== Série D: F1 Grand Prix cars (1961–1965) ===
Pos.	No.	Driver	Car	Year	Laps	Time/retired	Grid
1	9	(United Kingdom) Andy Middlehurst	Lotus 25	1962	10	18:20.139	1
2	5	(United States) Joe Colasacco	Ferrari 1512	1964	10	+0.608	2
3	4	(United States) James King	Brabham BT7	1963	10	+22.161	3
4	16	(United States) Charles Nearburg	Brabham BT11	1964	10	+25.510	4
5	27	(United Kingdom) Andrew Beaumont	Lotus 24	1962	10	+1:16.249	6
6	10	(United Kingdom) Dan Collins	Lotus 21	1961	10	+1:16.450	7
7	19	(United Kingdom) Sidney Hoole	Cooper T66	1963	10	+1:24.802	8
8	34	(United Kingdom) Lee Mowle	Lotus 18	1961	10	+1:27.117	10
9	8	(United Kingdom) Nick Taylor	Lotus 18	1961	10	+1:30.988	9
10	24	(France) Michel Gendre	Lotus 24	1962	10	+1:41.956	12
11	31	(United Kingdom) John Clark	Cooper T56	1961	10	+1:47.909	15
12	36	(United Kingdom) Chris Drake	Cooper T71/T73	1964	10	+1:51.933	32
13	35	(United Kingdom) Iain Rowley	Assegai	1961	9	+1 lap	5
14	26	(United States) Kurt DelBene	BRP-BRM	1964	9	+1 lap	11
15	1	(United States) John Romano	Brabham BT11	1964	9	+1 lap	16
16	15	(United Kingdom) Paul Woolley	Scirocco-BRM	1963	9	+1 lap	15
17	22	(Argentina) Carlos Miguens	Lotus 24	1962	9	+1 lap	21
18	20	(United States) Adam Lindemann	Lotus 18	1961	9	+1 lap	22
19	32	(United Kingdom) Bernardo Hartogs	Lotus 18/21	1961	9	+1 lap	25
20	17	(Argentina) Jorge Ferioli	Lola Mk4	1962	9	+1 lap	27
21	29	(United Kingdom) Matthew Newman	Brabham BT14	1965	9	+1 lap	29
22	3	(Luxembourg) Marco Rollinger	Brabham BT3	1962	9	+1 lap	30
23	12	(United Kingdom) Michael Kerry	Emeryson F1	1961	8	+2 laps	24
24	33	(Australia) Scotty Taylor	Lotus 18	1961	8	+2 laps	31
25	25	(United Kingdom) John Chisholm	Lotus 18	1961	7	+3 laps	19
26	30	(United Kingdom) James Timms	Cooper T53	1961	7	+3 laps	28
27	18	(France) Philippe Bonny	Brabham BT2	1963	5	+5 laps	13
28	21	(United States) John Delane	Lotus 21	1961	4	+6 laps	23
29	28	(France) "Mister John of B"	Lola Mk4	1962	2	+8 laps	20
DNS	6	(United States) Charles McCabe	BRM P57	1961			
DNS	7	(United Kingdom) Peter Mullen	BRM P261	1964			
DNS	14	(United Kingdom) Richard Wilson	Cooper T60	1962			
DNS	23	(France) Franck Trouillard	Lotus 21	1962			

=== Série E: F1 Grand Prix cars (1966–1972) ===
Pos.	No.	Driver	Car	Year	Laps	Time/retired	Grid
1	21	(Sweden) Björn Wirdheim	March 711	1971	12	20:09.785	1
2	15	(United Kingdom) Stuart Hall	McLaren M19A	1971	12	+0.389	2
3	1	(United Kingdom) Michael Lyons	Surtees TS9	1971	12	+15.894	9
4	7	(United States) Charles Nearburg	Brabham BT33	1970	12	+31.360	14
5	27	(United Kingdom) David Shaw	March 721	1972	12	+31.949	12
6	19	(Spain) Joaquín Folch-Rusiñol	McLaren M19C	1972	12	+33.392	11
7	11	(Switzerland) Philippe Scemama	Surtees TS9B	1971	12	+34.658	8
8	22	(Italy) Manfredo Rossi di Montelera	Tecno PA123-3	1972	12	+45.318	7
9	8	(United States) Duncan Dayton	Brabham BT33	1970	12	+58.384	18
10	25	(Monaco) Franco Meiners	Ferrari 312B3	1972	12	+59.063	16
11	2	(United Kingdom) Adrian Newey	Lotus 49B	1969	12	+59.663	13
12	23	(Italy) Bruno Ferrari	March 701	1970	12	+1:38.652	17
13	18	(United Kingdom) Mike Wrigley	March 721G	1972	12	+1:38.884	19
14	5	(Austria) Jürgen Boden	Ferrari 312B2	1971	11	+1 lap	20
15	24	(Belgium) Paul Grant	De Tomaso F1-70	1970	11	+1 lap	21
16	4	(United States) Chris MacAllister	Lotus 49	1967	11	+1 lap	23
17	9	(United Kingdom) Jamie Constable	Brabham BT37	1972	10	+2 laps	
18	6	(Japan) Katsuaki Kubota	Lotus 72	1971	9	+3 laps	4
19	10	(Monaco) Clivio Piccione	McLaren M14A	1970	9	+3 laps	10
20	12	(United Kingdom) Max Smith-Hilliard	Surtees TS9B	1971	8	+4 laps	3
21	3	(Italy) Paolo Barilla	Ferrari 312B	1970	8	+4 laps	5
22	17	(Switzerland) Michael Gans	Cooper T79	1966	6	+6 laps	24
23	20	(Monaco) Roald Goethe	Matra MS120C	1971	1	+11 laps	15
24	26	(Spain) Andy Soucek	BRM P153	1970	1	+11 laps	6
DNS	14	(United Kingdom) Christopher Perkins	Surtees TS14A	1973			

=== Série F: F1 Grand Prix cars (1973–1976) ===
Pos.	No.	Driver	Car	Year	Laps	Time/retired	Grid
1	7	(United Kingdom) Michael Lyons	McLaren M26	1976	18	34:38.567	2
2	8	(United Kingdom) Stuart Hall	McLaren M23	1973	18	+9.347	1
3	11	(Germany) Marco Werner	Ferrari 312B3	1974	18	+9.916	5
4	20	(United Kingdom) Andrew Haddon	Hesketh 308C	1975	18	+1:13.828	11
5	36	(South Africa) Jordan Grogor	Maki F101C	1974	18	+1:38.869	8
6	12	(Germany) Maximilian Werner	Ferrari 312B3	1974	17	+1 lap	19
7	5	(United Kingdom) Gregory Thornton	Lotus 77	1976	17	+1 lap	14
8	9	(United States) Martin Lauber	Shadow DN5	1975	17	+1 lap	12
9	31	(United Kingdom) Andrew Beaumont	Lotus 76	1974	16	+2 laps	16
10	33	(Italy) Piero Lottini	Surtees TS19	1976	16	+2 laps	22
11	2	(Greece) John Inglessis	Lotus 72E	1974	16	+2 laps	27
12	23	(France) Philippe Bonny	Trojan T103	1974	16	+2 laps	23
13	16	(Monaco) Yves Saguato	Shadow DN3	1974	15	+3 laps	28
14	22	(Italy) Alex Caffi	Ensign N176	1976	14	+4 laps	3
15	32	(Zimbabwe) Axcil Jefferies	Token RJ02	1974	12	+6 laps	6
16	18	(Monaco) Fabrice Pantani	Surtees TS16	1974	12	+6 laps	18
17	19	(Netherlands) Nicky Pastorelli	Surtees TS19	1976	9	+9 laps	9
18	26	(United Kingdom) Christopher Atkinson	Hesketh 308	1974	7	+11 laps	21
19	21	(United Kingdom) Michael Cantillon	Williams FW05	1975	4	+14 laps	10
20	6	(United Kingdom) Max Smith-Hilliard	Lotus 77	1976	3	+15 laps	7
21	34	(United States) Cal Meeker	Williams FW04	1975	3	+15 laps	26
22	25	(United Kingdom) Nick Padmore	Shadow DN5B	1976	3	+15 laps	4
23	4	(Monaco) Roald Goethe	Tyrrell 007	1974	1	+17 laps	17
No lap	24	(United Arab Emirates) Frederic Fatien	Hesketh 308B	1974			25
No lap	30	(United Arab Emirates) Jean-Pierre Valentini	Amon AF101	1974			30
DNS	3	(Luxembourg) Dany Rollinger	Williams FX3B	1973			
DNS	14	(Canada) Keith Frieser	Shadow DN1	1973			
DNS	28	(United States) Christopher Locke	Penske PC4	1974			
DNS	29	(United States) Bradley Hoyt	Hill GH1	1974			
DNS	27	(United Kingdom) Jamie Constable	Lola T370	1976			
DNS	15	(United States) Steven Tillack	Shadow DN5	1975			
EX	10	(United Kingdom) Dean Baker	Brabham BT42	1973			

=== Série G: F1 Grand Prix cars (1977–1980) ===
Pos.	No.	Driver	Car	Year	Laps	Time/retired	Grid
1	8	(United Kingdom) Martin O'Connell	ATS D4	1980	18	32:03.138	1
2	34	(United Kingdom) Nick Padmore	Shadow DN9	1978	18	+2.568	4
3	30	(South Africa) Jordan Grogor	Arrows A3	1980	18	+2.825	2
4	24	(United Kingdom) Michael Lyons	Hesketh 308E	1977	18	+39.737	3
5	17	(United Kingdom) Jamie Constable	Shadow DN8	1977	18	+53.252	12
6	1	(Italy) Manfredo Rossi di Montelera	Lotus 80	1979	18	+53.688	10
7	40	(United Kingdom) Steve Brooks	Lotus 81	1980	18	+59.440	9
8	3	(France) Fabrice L'Heritier	Tyrrell 009	1979	18	+1:14.961	15
9	25	(France) "Mister John of B"	Ligier JS11/15	1979	18	+1:17.024	14
10	7	(Belgium) Christophe d'Ansembourg	McLaren M26	1977	18	+1:54.202	11
11	12	(United Kingdom) Andrew Beaumont	Lotus 81	1980	17	+1 lap	16
12	39	(France) Patrick D'Aubreby	March 761	1977	17	+1 lap	23
13	28	(United Kingdom) Mark Hazell	Williams FW07B	1980	17	+1 lap	27
14	31	(United Kingdom) Ronald Maydon	LEC CRP1	1977	17	+1 lap	29
15	27	(Australia) Martin Bullock	Williams FW06	1978	17	+1 lap	24
16	26	(United Arab Emirates) Bassam Kronfli	March 761	1977	16	+2 laps	21
17	38	(United Kingdom) Paul Tattersall	Ensign N179	1979	16	+2 laps	26
18	37	(United States) Tom Minnich	Ensign N177	1979	15	+3 laps	25
19	6	(Spain) Joaquín Folch-Rusiñol	Brabham BT49	1980	14	+4 laps	7
20	35	(Netherlands) Nicky Pastorelli	Arrows A3	1980	12	+6 laps	5
21	2	(United Kingdom) Michael Cantillon	Tyrrell 010	1980	12	+6 laps	6
22	20	(United States) Douglas Mockett	Wolf WR6	1978	9	+9 laps	19
23	32	(United Kingdom) Philip Hall	Theodore TR1	1978	6	+12 laps	13
24	10	(France) Christian Perrier	ATS HS01	1978	2	+16 laps	18
25	21	(Netherlands) Frits van Eerd	Fittipaldi F7	1980	2	+16 laps	20
26	16	(France) Pierre-Brice Mena	Shadow DN8	1977	2	+16 laps	17
DNS	14	(United Kingdom) Max Smith-Hilliard	Fittipaldi F5A	1977			
DNS	19	(Germany) Alexander Furiani	Surtees TS20	1978			
DNS	33	(Italy) Cosimo Turizio	Hesketh 308E	1977			
DNS	36	(Germany) Harald Becker	Arrows A3	1980			
DNS	9	(Switzerland) Tiziano Carugati					
DNS	29	(Monaco) Frédéric Lajoux	Arrows A1	1978			
DNS	5	(Japan) Takuzo Kaneko	Lotus 78	1977			
DNS	9	(Switzerland) Christian Carugati	Arrows A3	1979			
DNS	18	(United Kingdom) Richard Hope	Shadow DN11	1980			
