= Tony Kotze =

South African racing driver

- Born: 23 January 1931; South Africa
- Died: 13 April 2016 (aged 85); Cape Town, South Africa

Anthony Kotze (23 January 1931 – 13 April 2016), referred to in some sources as Anthony Kotzé, was a racing driver and racing car constructor from South Africa. He participated in four non-championship Formula One races and several sports car races, and is perhaps best known as the constructor of the Assegai, one of the only South African-built Formula One cars.

== Career ==
Kotze began racing in 1956, with a car he built himself. He took part in several sports car races, including the inaugural South African Nine Hour Endurance Race in 1958. In 1960, he bought a Lotus 16 (the chassis raced by Bruce Halford at the 1959 Monaco Grand Prix), which he raced at the Cape and South African Grands Prix.

Following this, he elected to build his own car. His design, the Assegai, drew inspiration from the successful Ferrari 156 F1 and Lotus 18, but featured new innovations such as the fuel tank being a stressed chassis member. He entered the car for the 1962 Rand Grand Prix but did not qualify. Select events followed, including the 1965 Cape South Easter Trophy.

Kotze assisted with the Assegai's restoration to 1962 Formula One regulations for participation in the 2016 Historic Grand Prix of Monaco, but did not get to see the car racing again. He died the month before the event, following a short illness.
