= Assegai (automobile) =

Formula One car built by Tony Kotze

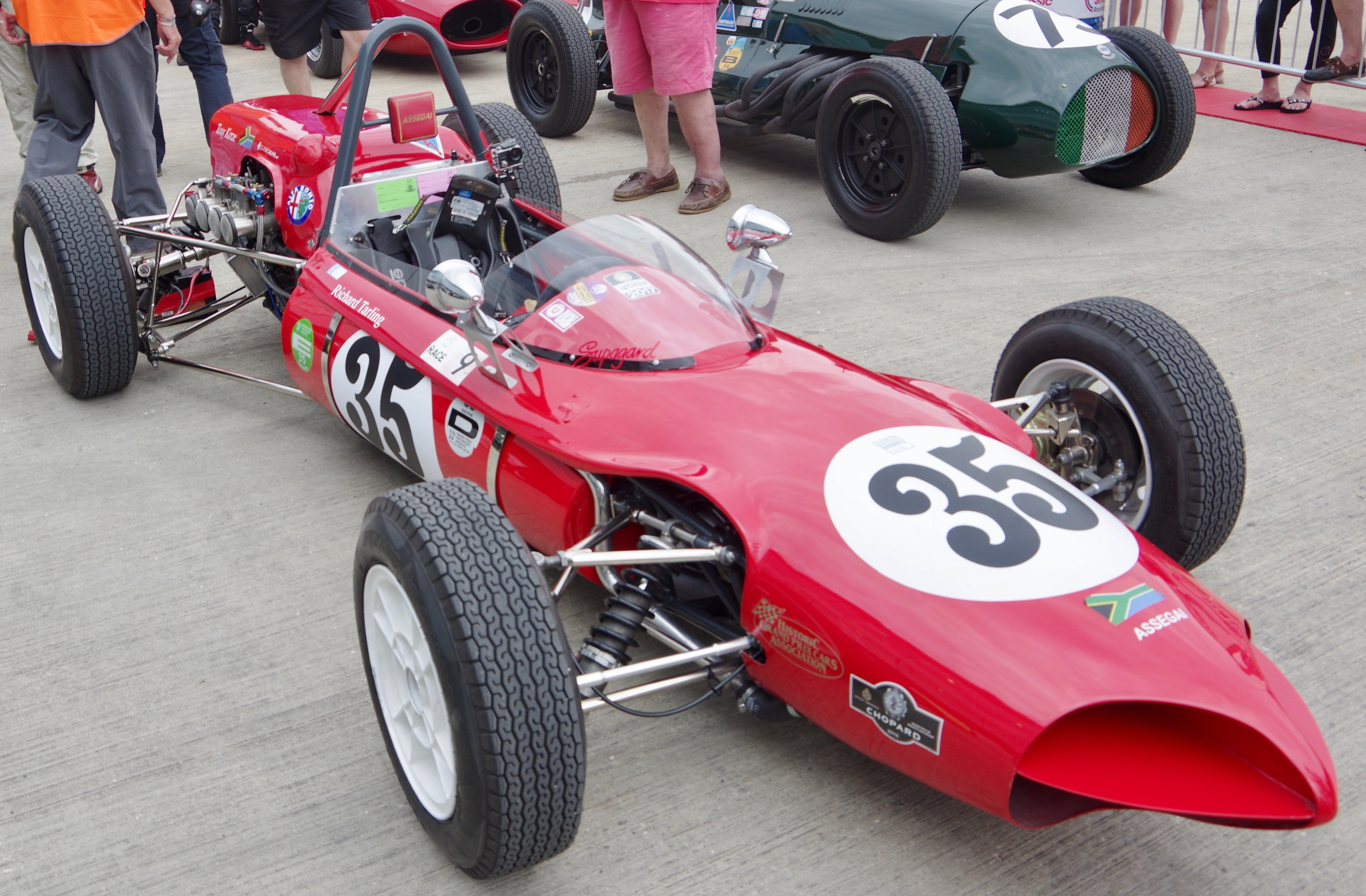
The unique Assegai car, built in 1962, on display at the 2019 Silverstone Classic race meeting

The Assegai was a Formula One car built by Tony Kotze under the marque Bond Cars. It was named after an African spear. It was entered for two non-championship Formula One races and various club-level races in South Africa. The Assegai and the LDS (built by Doug Serrurier) are the only Formula One cars to have been built by South African constructors.

Kotze was obsessed by the shark-nosed Ferrari 156 F1 that had dominated the 1961 Formula One season, and its influence can be seen in the Assegai's unique appearance. The construction took further inspiration from the Lotus 18, but with a lower and wider body for improved centre-of-gravity. The fuel tank formed a stressed member of the chassis, a novel idea at the time. The 1.5-litre engine, mated to a five-speed gearbox, was redeveloped from an Alfa Romeo road car to avoid the prohibitive expense of importing an engine from the UK. However, it suffered from reliability problems and a Ford engine was also tried in later years. Kotze intended to build four chassis, but only one was completed. The car is noted for its high build quality.

The Assegai's only international-level race appearance was for the 1962 Rand Grand Prix with Kotze at the wheel, but it did not qualify. It later raced with a Ford engine in the 1965 Cape South Easter Trophy.

The car has been involved in historic racing since at least 2000. It was purchased in 2015 and restored to 1962 Formula One regulations for the 2016 Historic Grand Prix of Monaco, receiving much public interest. It also participated in the 2018 event.
