= 2016 Historic Grand Prix of Monaco =

← Previous race	Next race →
- Circuit de Monaco

Race details
- Date: 13–15 May 2016
- Official name: 10e Grand Prix de Monaco Historique
- Location: Circuit de Monaco
- Course: Street circuit
- Course length: 3.337 km (2.074 miles)

The 2016 Historic Grand Prix of Monaco was the tenth running of the Historic Grand Prix of Monaco, a motor racing event for heritage Grand Prix, Voiturettes, Formula One, Formula Two and Sports cars.

== Report ==
For this event, Race A for pre-war Grand Prix cars lost its race status and was held as a parade.

On Wednesday 11 May, before the event got underway, a new permanent Race Control building was inaugurated by Prince Albert II. It had been built to ease the considerable effort required to construct the Grand Prix circuit each year, which can take up to six weeks.

Race D featured Prince Joachim of Denmark alongside countryman and former F1 driver Jac Nellemann. Nelleman did not start the race due to brake issues in qualifying.

A notable car in Race E was the Assegai, one of the only South African-built F1 cars. It had been purchased and restored to 1962 F1 regulations specifically for this event.

Anthony Beltoise took part in Race F, driving a Matra MS120C similar to that which his father Jean-Pierre had raced at Monaco during his F1 career. The chassis used was MS120-06, which had been driven by Chris Amon in the 1971 and the 1972 Formula One seasons. He had intended to drive the BRM P160B with which his father had won the 1972 Monaco Grand Prix, but the car was impossible to acquire in France because it carries tobacco sponsorship, due to the Loi Évin. Anthony ran seventh in the race, but retired with an oil leak. Also appearing in Race F was former F1 driver Paolo Barilla, who had restored a 1970 Ferrari 312B with help from its original designer Mauro Forghieri and 2002 Dakar Rally teammate Stefano Calzi. The car ran well in practice but retired on the opening lap of the race with a broken fuel pump. The restoration project was filmed and released as a feature-length documentary, Ferrari 312B.

Stirling Moss made an appearance to celebrate the 60th anniversary of his first Monaco Grand Prix victory in 1956, and was reunited with the Maserati 250F he drove in the race.

== Results ==
=== Summary ===
Série	Cars	Years	Pole position	Fastest lap		Race winner
B	Formula 1 and Formula 2	Pre-1961	(United Kingdom) Tony Wood	(United Kingdom) Tony Wood	1:55.205	(United Kingdom) Tony Wood
C	Sports cars	1952-1955	(United Kingdom) Chris Ward	(United Kingdom) Chris Ward	2:02.097	(United Kingdom) Chris Ward
D	Formula Junior - front engine	1958-1960	(United States) Joe Colasacco	(United Kingdom) Jonathon Hughes	1:57.197	(United Kingdom) Jonathon Hughes
E	Formula 1 - 1500 cm^{3}	1961-1965	(United Kingdom) Andy Middlehurst	(United Kingdom) Andy Middlehurst	1:49.994	(United Kingdom) Andy Middlehurst
F	Formula 1	1966-1972	(United Kingdom) Stuart Hall	(United Kingdom) Stuart Hall	1:34.107	(United Kingdom) Stuart Hall
G	Formula 1	1973-1976	(Italy) Alex Caffi	(Italy) Alex Caffi	1:34.282	(Italy) Alex Caffi

=== Série B: Pre-1961 F1 Grand Prix Cars and F2 ===
Pos.	No.	Driver	Car	Year	Laps	Time/retired	Grid
1	36	(United Kingdom) Tony Wood	Tec-Mec F415	1959	10	20:34.124	1
2	50	(Switzerland) Michael Gans	Scarab F1	1960	10	+1.722	
3	40	(New Zealand) Roger Wills	Lotus 16	1958	10	+4.109	
4	32	(Spain) Guillermo Fierro-Eleta	Maserati 250F	1954	10	+22.146	
5	38	(Spain) Joaquín Folch-Rusiñol	Lotus 16	1959	10	+22.425	
6	20	(United Kingdom) Tony Smith	Ferrari Dino 246	1960	10	+35.204	
7	58	(United Kingdom) Ian Nuthall	Alta F2	1952	10	+49.973	
8	68	(Belgium) Paul Grant	Cooper T23 (Mk2)	1953	10	+50.698	
9	64	(United Kingdom) Eddie McGuire	Cooper T20 (Mk1)	1952	10	+53.520	
10	72	(United Kingdom) Steve Russell	Cooper T23 (Mk2)	1953	10	+1:19.893	
11	60	(United Kingdom) David Wenman	Cooper T20 (Mk1)	1952	10	+1:21.689	
12	48	(United Kingdom) Samuel Stretton	Ferrari 555 "Supersqualo"	1955	10	+1:42.180	
13	10	(Belgium) Marc Valvekens	Gordini T16	1954	10	+1:46.134	
14	66	(United Kingdom) Guy Plante	Cooper T23 (Mk2)	1953	10	+1:48.499	
15	42	(United Kingdom) Marshall Bailey	Lotus 16	1959	10	+1:51.310	
16	28	(United States) Graham Adelman	Maserati 250F	1956	10	+1:55.142	
17	56	(Austria) Martin Halusa	Maserati 250F	1959	10	+1:55.822	
18	62	(United Kingdom) Barry Wood	Cooper T20 (Mk1)	1952	9	+1 lap	
19	14	(Germany) Helmut Gassmann	Connaught B	1955	9	+1 lap	
20	34	(Germany) Alexander Satov	Maserati 250F "Piccolo"	1958	9	+1 lap	
21	18	(France) Jean-Jacques Bally	Gordini T11/15	1951	9	+1 lap	
22	74	(Netherlands) Adrien van der Kroft	Connaught A	1952	9	+1 lap	
23	70	(France) Jean Georges van Praet	Cooper T23 (Mk2)	1953	9	+1 lap	
24	22	(United Kingdom) Julia de Baldanza	Maserati A6GCM	1951	9	+1 lap	
25	12	(France) Claude Picasso	Gordini T11/15	1952	8	+2 laps	
DNS	44	(Italy) Pier Angelo Masselli	Lotus 16	1958			
EX	24	(United Kingdom) Simon Diffey	Maserati 250F "Interim"	1954			

=== Série C: Sports racing cars raced from 1952 to 1955 inclusive ===
Pos.	No.	Driver	Car	Year	Laps	Time/retired	Grid
1	64	(United Kingdom) Chris Ward	Jaguar C-Type	1952	10	21:37.748	1
2	74	(United Kingdom) Frederic Wakeman	Cooper T38	1955	10	+7.496	
3	52	(United Kingdom) Till Bechtolsheimer	Allard J2	1950	10	+14.131	
4	2	(United Kingdom) Barry Wood	Lister-Bristol	1954	10	+39.335	
5	50	(United Kingdom) Patrick Watts	Allard J2	1950	10	+40.930	
6	10	(Germany) Michael Willms	Maserati 150S/200S	1955	10	+42.467	
7	80	(United Kingdom) Steve Brooks	Aston Martin DB3S	1955	10	+53.158	
8	86	(United Kingdom) Andrew Hall	HWM-Jaguar Sport	1954	10	+1:04.241	
9	60	(United Kingdom) Nigel Webb	Jaguar C-Type	1952	10	+1:08.519	
10	84	(United Kingdom) Nicolas Bert	HWM Alta Jaguar	1952	10	+1:09.200	
11	34	(United Kingdom) Martin Hunt	Frazer Nash Le Mans Replica (Mk2)	1952	10	+1:10.442	
12	38	(United Kingdom) Martin Stretton	Frazer Nash Targa Florio	1952	10	+1:14.729	
13	12	(France) Jean-Jacques Bally	Maserati A6GCS	1953	10	+1:15.381	
14	88	(France) Nicolas Chambon	Maserati 300S	1955	10	+1:16.470	
15	30	(United Kingdom) Patrick Blakeney-Edwards	Frazer Nash Le Mans Replica (Mk1)	1951	10	+1:18.993	
16	82	(Germany) Wolfgang Friedrichs	Aston Martin DB3S	1954	10	+1:20.783	
17	54	(Canada) Bob Francis	Allard J2	1951	10	+1:30.620	
18	56	(Italy) Massimiliano Bettati	Allard J2X	1952	10	+1:31.081	
19	100	(Italy) Roberto Crippa	Ferrari 340 MM	1953	10	+1:43.900	
20	70	(United Kingdom) Derek Hood	Cooper T33	19545	10	+1:44.899	
21	4	(United Kingdom) Keith Fell	Lister Flat Iron	1955	10	+1:46.856	
22	36	(United Kingdom) Philip Champion	Frazer Nash Mille Miglia	1951	10	+2:10.760	
23	16	(Germany) Lutz Rathenow	Veritas RS2000	1948	10	+2:13.995	
24	22	(Germany) Michael Roeder	Ferrari 500 Mondial	1955	9	+1 lap	
25	28	(United Kingdom) Tim Summers	Frazer Nash Le Mans Replica (Mk1)	1950	9	+1 lap	
26	66	(United States) Tom Price	Jaguar C-Type	1953	9	+1 lap	
27	72	(Germany) Katarina Kyvalova	Cooper T33	1954	9	+1 lap	
28	32	(United States) John Breslow	Frazer Nash Le Mans Replica (Mk2)	1952	9	+1 lap	
29	76	(United Kingdom) Martin Melling	Aston Martin DB3	1952	9	+1 lap	
30	78	(Switzerland) Arlette Muller	Aston Martin DB3	1952	9	+1 lap	
31	18	(Luxembourg) Goy Feltes	BMW Special	1951	9	+1 lap	
32	26	(United States) "Ned" Spieker	Frazer Nash High Speed	1948	9	+1 lap	
33	62	(Switzerland) Hans-Martin Schneeberger	Jaguar C-Type	1952	9	+1 lap	
34	94	(United States) Najeeb Khan	Ferrari 225 S	1952	8	+2 laps	
35	90	(Switzerland) Conrad Ulrich	Maserati 300S	1955	6	+4 laps	
36	92	(United Kingdom) Bernardo Hartogs	Ferrari 212 Export	1953	2	+8 laps	
No lap	58	(United Kingdom) Eddie McGuire	Gordini T23S	1952			
No lap	96	(Austria) Jürgen Boden	Ferrari 225 S	1952			
DNS	20	(Spain) Juan Quintano	Ferrari 166 MM	1950			
DNS	68	(Switzerland) Clive Joy	Jaguar D-Type	1955			
DNS	98	(Switzerland) Arnold Meier	Ferrari 250 MM	1953			
DNS		(United Kingdom) John Ure	Cooper-Bristol				

=== Série D: Formula Junior - front engine (1958–1960) ===
Pos.	No.	Driver	Car	Year	Laps	Time/retired	Grid
1	23	(United Kingdom) Jonathon Hughes	Lola Mk2	1960	10	21:43.471	
2	18	(Switzerland) Christian Traber	Lola Mk2	1960	10	+10.360	
3	27	(United Kingdom) Ray Mallock	U2 Mk2	1960	10	+21.087	
4	41	(United Kingdom) Stuart Roach	Stanguellini FJ	1959	10	+25.769	
5	16	(France) Ralf Emmerling	Gemini Mk2	1959	10	+30.413	
6	8	(United Kingdom) Michael Walker	Bond FJ	1960	10	+34.052	
7	40	(United States) Joe Colasacco	Stanguellini FJ	1959	10	+46.839	1
8	9	(New Zealand) Anthony Olissoff	Elfin Mk1	1960	10	+1:14.553	
9	45	(Italy) Daniele Salodini	Taraschi FJ	1960	10	+1:26.723	
10	48	Prince Joachim of Denmark	Volpini FJ	1959	10	+1:27.098	
11	19	(New Zealand) Roger Herrick	Lola Mk2	1959	10	+1:44.407	
12	34	(United Kingdom) Crispian Besley	OSCA Tipo J	1960	10	+1:45.065	
13	17	(United Kingdom) Paul Dixon	Gemini Mk2	1959	10	+1:45.557	
14	15	(United Kingdom) John Chisholm	Gemini Mk2	1959	10	+1:46.701	
15	4	(United Kingdom) Stephen Barlow	BMC Mk1	1960	10	+1:56.109	
16	44	(United Kingdom) Graeme Smith	Taraschi FJ	1960	10	+2:00.450	
17	37	(Luxembourg) Tommy Rollinger	Stanguellini FJ	1959	9	+1 lap	
18	1	(United Kingdom) Richard Bishop Miller	Autosport Mk2	1960	9	+1 lap	
19	6	(New Zealand) Neil Tolich	Jocko Special FJ	1959	9	+1 lap	
20	3	(Italy) Renato Benusiglio	Apache Mk1	1959	9	+1 lap	
21	24	(United Kingdom) William Grimshaw	Moorland Mk1	1959	9	+1 lap	
22	21	(United States) "Ned" Spieker	Lola Mk2	1960	9	+1 lap	
23	28	(New Zealand) Paul Halford	Autosud FJ	1959	9	+1 lap	
24	14	(New Zealand) Michael Sexton	Gemini Mk2	1959	9	+1 lap	
25	20	(United States) Harindra de Silva	Lola Mk2	1959	9	+1 lap	
26	25	(United Kingdom) Vernon Williamson	Scorpion 500	1960	9	+1 lap	
27	39	(United Kingdom) Richard Pugh	Stanguellini FJ	1960	9	+1 lap	
28	5	(United Kingdom) Kevin Musson	Dolphin FJ	1960	9	+1 lap	
29	7	(United Kingdom) Duncan Rabagliati	Alexis HF1	1959	9	+1 lap	
30	33	(Switzerland) Francesco Baldanza	OSCA Tipo J	1960	9	+1 lap	
31	12	(Italy) Franco Fraquelli	Elva 100	1959	9	+1 lap	
32	36	(Belgium) Jan Biekens	Stanguellini FJ	1959	8	+2 laps	
33	49	(United Kingdom) Roger Woodbridge	Volpini FJ	1958	8	+2 laps	
34	46	(Italy) Luciano Carcheri	Taraschi FJ	1960	7	+3 laps	
35	10	(United States) Alan Patterson	Elva 100	1959	7	+3 laps	
36	11	(United Kingdom) Nick Taylor	Elva 100	1959	6	+4 laps	
37	42	(United Kingdom) Francesco Liberatore	Stanguellini FJ	1960	6	+4 laps	
38	38	(United Kingdom) Peter Fenichel	Stanguellini FJ	1959	4	+6 laps	
39	32	(United States) Nick Grewal	OSCA Tipo J	1959	4	+6 laps	
40	30	(Belgium) Pierre Hallet	Faranda FJ	1959	2	+8 laps	
41	22	(United Kingdom) Justin Fleming	Lola Mk2	1960	1	+9 laps	
42	31	(Italy) Simone Tacconi	Moroni FJ	1959	1	+9 laps	
No lap	26	(United Kingdom) Chris Drake	Terrier Mk4	1960			
DNS	2	(Denmark) Jac Nellemann	Alfa Dana FJ	1959		Brakes	

=== Série E: 1500cc - F1 Grand Prix cars (1961 - 1965) ===
Pos.	No.	Driver	Car	Year	Laps	Time/retired	Grid
1	9	(United Kingdom) Andy Middlehurst	Lotus 25	1962	12	22:24.838	1
2	18	(United States) Joe Colasacco	Ferrari 1512	1964	12	+16.509	
3	21	(United Kingdom) Dan Collins	Lotus 21	1961	12	+46.784	
4	12	(France) Michel Gendre	Lotus 24	1962	12	+53.195	
5	19	(United Kingdom) Sidney Hoole	Cooper T66	1963	12	+53.361	
6	36	(United Kingdom) Robert Hall	Lotus 21	1961	12	+1:15.559	
7	14	(United Kingdom) Andrew Beaumont	Lotus 24	1962	12	+1:39.344	
8	11	(United Kingdom) Alex Morton	Lotus 21	1961	12	+1:43.293	
9	26	(United States) Kurt DelBene	BRP-BRM	1964	12	+1:53.002	
10	7	(United Kingdom) Peter Mullen	BRM P261	1964	11	+1 lap	
11	20	(United Kingdom) Andrew Hibberd	Lotus 18	1961	11	+1 lap	
12	35	(United Kingdom) Iain Rowley	Assegai	1961	11	+1 lap	
13	6	(United States) Charles McCabe	BRM P57	1961	11	+1 lap	
14	2	(United Kingdom) Christopher Milner	Lotus 24	1962	11	+1 lap	
15	22	(Argentina) Carlos Miguens	Lotus 24	1962	11	+1 lap	
16	16	(United States) John Romano	Brabham BT11	1964	11	+1 lap	
17	34	(Australia) Scotty Taylor	Lotus 18	1961	11	+1 lap	
18	3	(Luxembourg) Marco Rollinger	Brabham BT3	1962	10	+2 laps	
19	25	(United Kingdom) John Clark	Cooper T56	1961	10	+2 laps	
20	4	(United States) James King	Brabham BT7	1963	8	+4 laps	
21	8	(United Kingdom) Michael Hibberd	Lotus 18	1961	8	+4 laps	
22	5	(United Kingdom) David Clark	BRM P57	1961	6	+6 laps	
No lap	29	(United Kingdom) Martin Stretton	Scirocco-BRM	1963			
DNS	23	(Italy) Ross Zampatti	De Tomaso F1	1961			
DNS	24	(United Kingdom) Brian Anthony Ashby	Emeryson F1	1961			
DNS	27	(France) David Ferrer	Lola Mk4	1962			
DNS	28	(France) "Mister John of B"	Lola Mk4	1962			

=== Série F: F1 Grand Prix cars (1966 - 1972) ===
Pos.	No.	Driver	Car	Year	Laps	Time/retired	Grid
1	15	(United Kingdom) Stuart Hall	McLaren M19A	1971	18	28:44.528	1
2	12	(United Kingdom) Max Smith-Hilliard	Surtees TS9B	1971	18	+39.875	2
3	5	(United States) Charles Nearburg	Brabham BT33	1970	18	+54.740	4
4	16	(Spain) Joaquín Folch-Rusiñol	McLaren M19C	1972	18	+1:19.805	
5	9	(Monaco) Franco Meiners	Ferrari 312B3	1972	18	+1:21.595	
6	11	(Switzerland) Philippe Scemama	Surtees TS9B	1971	17	+1 lap	
7	2	(United Kingdom) Adrian Newey	Lotus 49B	1969	17	+1 lap	
8	23	(Italy) Bruno Ferrari	March 701	1970	17	+1 lap	
9	1	(United States) John Delane	Tyrrell 001	1970	16	+2 laps	
10	10	(Monaco) Roald Goethe	McLaren M14A	1970	16	+2 laps	
11	19	(Sweden) Eje Elgh	March 711	1971	16	+2 laps	
12	17	(United States) Chris MacAllister	Lotus 49	1967	11	+7 laps	
13	28	(United Kingdom) James Littlejohn	March 701	1970	10	+8 laps	5
14	22	(United Kingdom) David Shaw	March 721	1972	7	+11 laps	
15	21	(France) Anthony Beltoise	Matra MS120B	1971	5	+13 laps	
16	14	(United Kingdom) Judith Lyons	Surtees TS9	1971	5	+13 laps	
17	26	(United Kingdom) Robert Hall	BRM P153	1970	3	+15 laps	
18	8	(United States) Duncan Dayton	Brabham BT33	1970	2	+16 laps	3
No lap	4	(Italy) Paolo Barilla	Ferrari 312B	1970			
No lap	27	(France) David Ferrer	March 701	1970			

=== Série G: Formula 1 cars (1973 - 1976) ===
Pos.	No.	Driver	Car	Year	Laps	Time/retired	Grid
1	22	(Italy) Alex Caffi	Ensign N176	1976	17	28:52.334	1
2	10	(Japan) Katsuaki Kubota	March 761	1976	17	+2.491	
3	43	(United Kingdom) Joe Twyman	Shadow DN8	1976	17	+4.140	
4	11	(Italy) Emanuele Pirro	Ferrari 312B3	1974	17	+26.851	
5	17	(United Kingdom) Gregor Fisken	Shadow DN5	1975	17	+47.169	
6	32	(France) Patrick D'Aubreby	March 761	1976	17	+51.011	
7	39	(United Kingdom) Mark Higson	March 761	1976	17	+1:04.576	
8	44	(United Kingdom) Michael Cantillon	Williams FW05	1975	17	+1:10.562	
9	36	(Luxembourg) Dany Rollinger	Williams FX3B	1973	17	+1:14.694	
10	14	(Canada) Keith Frieser	Shadow DN1	1973	17	+2:52.340	
11	5	(United Kingdom) Gregory Thornton	Lotus 77	1976	16	+1 lap	
12	2	(Greece) John Inglessis	Lotus 72D	1970	16	+1 lap	
13	35	(Belgium) Marc Devis	Maki F101C	1974	16	+1 lap	
14	28	(United Kingdom) Chris Drake	Penske PC3	1975	16	+1 lap	
15	15	(United Kingdom) Phil Quaife	Shadow DN3	1974	16	+1 lap	
16	9	(United States) Christopher Locke	Lotus 77	1976	16	+1 lap	
17	38	(Italy) Piero Lottini	Surtees TS19	1976	16	+1 lap	
18	7	(United Kingdom) Frank Lyons	McLaren M26	1976	16	+1 lap	
19	37	(United Kingdom) Tommy Dreelan	March 761	1976	16	+1 lap	
20	23	(France) Philippe Bonny	Trojan T103	1974	16	+1 lap	
21	25	(United States) Bradley Hoyt	Hill GH1	1975	16	+1 lap	
22	6	(Monaco) Scott Walker	McLaren M23	1974	16	+1 lap	
23	31	(United Kingdom) Andrew Beaumont	Lotus 76	1974	15	+2 laps	
24	24	(United Arab Emirates) Frederic Fatien	Hesketh 308	1974	15	+2 laps	
25	21	(United States) Richard Carlino	Hesketh 308C	1975	14	+3 laps	
26	16	(Monaco) Yves Saguato	Shadow DN3	1974	12	+5 laps	
27	34	(United States) Douglas Mockett	Penske PC4	1976	11	+6 laps	
28	1	(United States) Chris MacAllister	Ferrari 312T2	1976	8	+9 laps	
29	33	(United Kingdom) Max Smith-Hilliard	Lotus 77	1976	8	+9 laps	
30	3	(Germany) Marco Werner	Ferrari 312B3	1973	7	+10 laps	
31	19	(Switzerland) Jean-Denis Delétraz	Surtees TS19	1976	6	+11 laps	
32	40	(United States) Martin Laubert	Shadow DN5	1975	5	+12 laps	
33	20	(South Africa) Jordan Grogor	Williams FW03	1974	2	+15 laps	
34	12	(Italy) Giancarlo Casoli	Ferrari 312T	1975	2	+15 laps	
35	41	(United Kingdom) Ian Simmonds	Shadow DN5	1976	2	+15 laps	
No lap	4	(Monaco) Roald Goethe	Tyrrell 007	1974			
No lap	8	(United Kingdom) Stuart Hall	McLaren M23	1973			
No lap	18	(Monaco) Fabrice Pantani	Surtees TS16	1974			
No lap	26	(United Kingdom) James Hagan	Hesketh 308	1974			
No lap	27	(United Kingdom) Jamie Constable	Lola T370	1974			
No lap	30	(United Kingdom) Ron Maydon	Amon AF101	1974			
