= 1965 Cape South Easter Trophy =

- Non-championship race in the 1965 Formula One season

Race details
- Date: 9 January 1965
- Official name: Cape South Easter Trophy
- Location: Killarney
- Course: Permanent racing facility
- Course length: 3.267 km (2.03 miles)
- Distance: 50 laps, 163.35 km (101.50 miles)

Pole position
Driver	(Rhodesia) John Love	Cooper-Climax
- Time: 1:27.5

Podium
First	(Australia) Paul Hawkins	Brabham-Climax
Second	(Rhodesia) John Love	Cooper-Climax
Third	(United Kingdom) David Prophet	Brabham-Climax

The 1965 Cape South Easter Trophy was a non-championship Formula One race held at Killarney on 9 January 1965, one week after the South African Grand Prix.

== Results ==
Pos	Driver	Constructor	Time/Retired	Grid
1	(Australia) Paul Hawkins	Brabham-Climax	1:16:04.4	
2	(Rhodesia) John Love	Cooper-Climax	+13.9	1
3	(United Kingdom) David Prophet	Brabham-Climax	+38.3	
4	(South Africa) Peter de Klerk	Alfa Special-Alfa Romeo	+2:01.0	
5	(Rhodesia) Sam Tingle	LDS-Alfa Romeo	+2:01.0	
6	(South Africa) Dennis Guscott	Lotus-Climax	+4:17.2	
NC	(South Africa) Trevor Blokdyk	Cooper-Ford		
NC	(Rhodesia) Clive Puzey	Lotus-Climax		
NC	(South Africa) Brausch Niemann	Lotus-Ford		
Ret	(South Africa) Doug Serrurier	LDS-Alfa Romeo		
Ret	(South Africa) Tony Kotze	Assegai-Ford		
Ret	(South Africa) David Hume	Heron-Alfa Romeo		
Ret	(South Africa) Jackie Pretorius	LDS-Alfa Romeo		
Ret	(France) Henri Le Roux	Elfin-Ford		
Ret	(South Africa) Ernie Pieterse	Lotus-Climax		
Ret	(South Africa) Dave Clapham	Cooper-Maserati		
Ret	(South Africa) Dawie Gous	Porsche		
DNA	(South Africa) Dave Charlton	Lotus-Ford		
