= 1960 Cape Grand Prix =

Race details
- Date: 17 December 1960
- Official name: Cape Grand Prix
- Location: Killarney
- Course: Permanent racing facility
- Course length: 2.060 km (3.315 miles)
- Distance: 72 laps, 238.68 km (148.32 miles)

Pole position
Driver	N/A	N/A

Fastest lap
Driver	(Sweden) Jo Bonnier	Porsche
- Time: 1:31.1

Podium
First	(United Kingdom) Stirling Moss	Porsche
Second	(Sweden) Jo Bonnier	Porsche
Third	(Germany) Wolfgang von Trips	Lotus

The 1960 Cape Grand Prix was a motor race, run to Formula Libre rules, held on 17 December 1960 at Killarney in South Africa. The race was run over 72 laps of the circuit, and was just won by British driver Stirling Moss in a Porsche 718. Jo Bonnier came in second with the fastest lap. The German driver Wolfgang von Trips was third in a Lotus.

== Results ==
Pos	Driver	Entrant	Constructor	Time/Retired
1	(United Kingdom) Stirling Moss	Porsche System Engineering	Porsche	1h57m40.8, 121.68 km/h
2	(Sweden) Jo Bonnier	Porsche System Engineering	Porsche	1h57m41.2
3	(Germany) Wolfgang von Trips	Team Lotus	Lotus-Climax	72 laps
4	(South Africa) Bruce Johnstone	Bruce Johnstone	Cooper-Alfa Romeo	72 laps
5	(Netherlands) Carel Godin de Beaufort	Ecurie Maarsbergen	Cooper-Climax	70 laps
6	(South Africa) Gene Bosman	Scuderia Alfa	Lotus-Alfa Romeo	70 laps
7	(South Africa) Syd van der Vyver	Syd van der Vyver	Lotus-Alfa Romeo	70 laps
8	(Federation of Rhodesia and Nyasaland) John Love	John Love	Cooper-Maserati	69 laps
9	(South Africa) Doug Serrurier	Doug Serrurier	Cooper-Alfa Romeo	67 laps
10	(South Africa) Bruce Jennings	Bruce Jennings	Porsche	67 laps
Ret	(South Africa) Don Philp	Don Philp	Cooper-Climax	Mechanical Problems
Ret	(South Africa) J.Hanning	J.Hanning	Austin-Jaguar	66 laps
Ret	(South Africa) G.Cannell	G.Cannell	Cooper-Chevrolet	64 laps
Ret	(Germany) Wolfgang Seidel	Wolfgang Seidel	Cooper-Climax	62 laps
Ret	(South Africa) Dawie Gous	Dawie Gous	Porsche-Spyder	48 laps
Ret	(Federation of Rhodesia and Nyasaland) Sam Tingle	Sam Tingle	Connaught	
Ret	(South Africa) Fanie Viljoen	Fanie Viljoen	Maserati 200SI	
Ret	(South Africa) Clive Trundell	Clive Trundell	Austin-Riley	
Ret	(South Africa) Helmut Menzler	Helmut Menzler	Lotus-Borgward	
Ret	(South Africa) Tony Kotze	Bond Cars	Lotus	
Ret	(South Africa) Vic Proctor	Vic Proctor	Vic's Alfa Romeo	
