= 1962 Rand Grand Prix =

- Non-championship race in the 1962 Formula One season
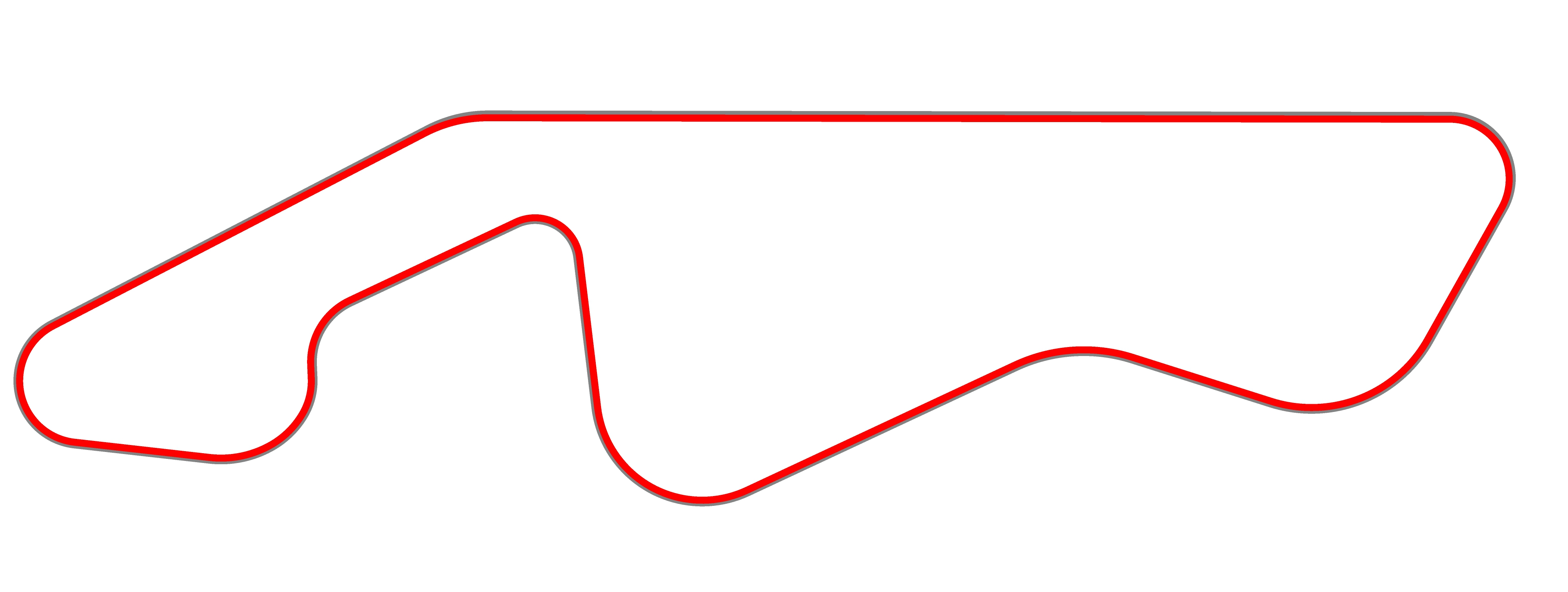

Race details
- Date: 15 December 1962
- Official name: V Rand Grand Prix
- Location: Kyalami, Johannesburg
- Course: Permanent racing facility
- Course length: 4.096 km (2.545 miles)
- Distance: 50 laps, 204.8 km (127.25 miles)

Pole position
Driver	(United Kingdom) Jim Clark	Lotus-Climax
- Time: 1:35.0

Fastest lap
Driver	(United Kingdom) Jim Clark	Lotus-Climax
- Time: 1:35.3

Podium
First	(United Kingdom) Jim Clark	Lotus-Climax
Second	(United Kingdom) Trevor Taylor	Lotus-Climax
Third	(United Kingdom) John Surtees	Lola-Climax

The 5th Rand Grand Prix was a motor race, run to Formula One rules, held on 15 December 1962 at Kyalami, South Africa. The race was run over 50 laps of the circuit, and was won by British driver Jim Clark, who led from start to finish in his Lotus 25.

There were a very large number of entries for this race, and many of the local drivers did not qualify. Among the more unusual entries was the Lotus 7 of Brausch Niemann, and the non-qualifying Cooper of Dave Riley, which was fitted with a BMC engine.

== Results ==
Pos	Driver	Entrant	Constructor	Time/Retired	Grid
1	(United Kingdom) Jim Clark	Team Lotus	Lotus-Climax	1.20:47.4	1
2	(United Kingdom) Trevor Taylor	Team Lotus	Lotus-Climax	+ 0.3 s	2
3	(United Kingdom) John Surtees	Bowmaker Racing Team	Lola-Climax	+ 23.7 s	4
4	(Federation of Rhodesia and Nyasaland) Gary Hocking	Rob Walker Racing Team	Lotus-Climax	49 laps	11
5	(South Africa) Neville Lederle	Neville Lederle	Lotus-Climax	49 laps	8
6	(South Africa) Doug Serrurier	Otelle Nucci	LDS-Alfa Romeo	48 laps	9
7	(South Africa) Peter de Klerk	Otelle Nucci	Alfa Special-Alfa Romeo	47 laps	13
8	(Federation of Rhodesia and Nyasaland) Sam Tingle	Sam Tingle	LDS-Alfa Romeo	47 laps	19
9	(South Africa) Fanie Viljoen	G.E. Mennie	LDS-Climax	46 laps	15
10	(South Africa) Brausch Niemann	Brausch Niemann	Lotus-Ford	46 laps	21
11	(South Africa) Ernie Pieterse	Ernie Pieterse	Lotus-Climax	46 laps	12
12	(South Africa) Bernard Podmore	Grosvenor Motors	Lotus-Climax	44 laps	17
13	(South Africa) Gene Bosman	Gene Bosman	LDS-Alfa Romeo	43 laps	18
14	(South Africa) Bob van Niekerk	Equipe Judette	Lotus-Climax	40 laps	14
15	(United States) Richie Ginther	Owen Racing Organisation	BRM	36 laps / Engine	5
Ret	(South Africa) Tony Maggs	John Love	Cooper-Climax	Gearbox	10
Ret	(South Africa) Syd van der Vyver	Syd van der Vyver	Lotus-Climax	Clutch	7
Ret	(United Kingdom) Innes Ireland	UDT Laystall Racing Team	Lotus-Climax	Front suspension	6
Ret	(United Kingdom) Graham Hill	Owen Racing Organisation	BRM	Gearbox	3
Ret	(South Africa) Mike Harris	Mike Harris	Cooper-Alfa Romeo	Puncture	20
Ret	(South Africa) Adrian Pheiffer	Adrian Pheiffer	Cooper-Alfa Romeo	Gearbox	16
DNQ	(South Africa) Trevor Blokdyk	Hoffman Racing Team	Cooper-Alfa Romeo		–
DNQ	(South Africa) Bill Dunlop	Bill Dunlop	Cooper-Alfa Romeo		–
DNQ	(South Africa) Tony Kotze	Bond Cars	Assegai-Alfa Romeo		–
DNQ	(South Africa) Vern McWilliams	Vern McWilliams	Lotus-Borgward		–
DNQ	(South Africa) Peter van Niekerk	Ted Lanfear	Lotus-Ford		–
DNQ	(South Africa) Errol Hammon	Errol Hammon	LDS-Ford		–
DNQ	(South Africa) Lionel Wilmot	Lionel Wilmot	Lotus-Ford		–
DNQ	(South Africa) Clive Trundell	Clive Trundell	Cooper-Climax		–
DNQ	(South Africa) Dave Charlton	Ecurie Tomahawk	Lotus-Ford		–
DNQ	(Federation of Rhodesia and Nyasaland) Dave Riley	Dave Riley	Cooper-BMC		–
DNQ	(South Africa) Eric Glasby	Eric Glasby	Cooper-Alfa Romeo		–
DNQ	(South Africa) Jack Holme	Jack Holme	Lotus-Climax		–
DNQ	(South Africa) Rauten Hartmann	Rauten Hartmann	Netuar-Peugeot		–
WD	(Australia) Ray Cresp	Hoffman Racing Team	Cooper-Alfa Romeo		–
WD	(South Africa) Neville Austin	Neville Austin	Cooper-Climax	Car driven by Trundell	–
WD	(South Africa) Bruce Johnstone	Bruce Johnstone	BRM	No car	–

- Gary Hocking was also entered in his own Lotus-Climax, but raced the one entered by the Rob Walker Racing Team.
- Scuderia Lupini entered a Cooper-Maserati but withdrew it without designating a driver.

Previous race: 1962 Mexican Grand Prix	Formula One non-championship races 1962 season	Next race: 1962 Natal Grand Prix
Previous race: 1961 Rand Grand Prix	Rand Grand Prix	Next race: 1963 Rand Grand Prix
