= Ferrari 312 =

Formula One racing car

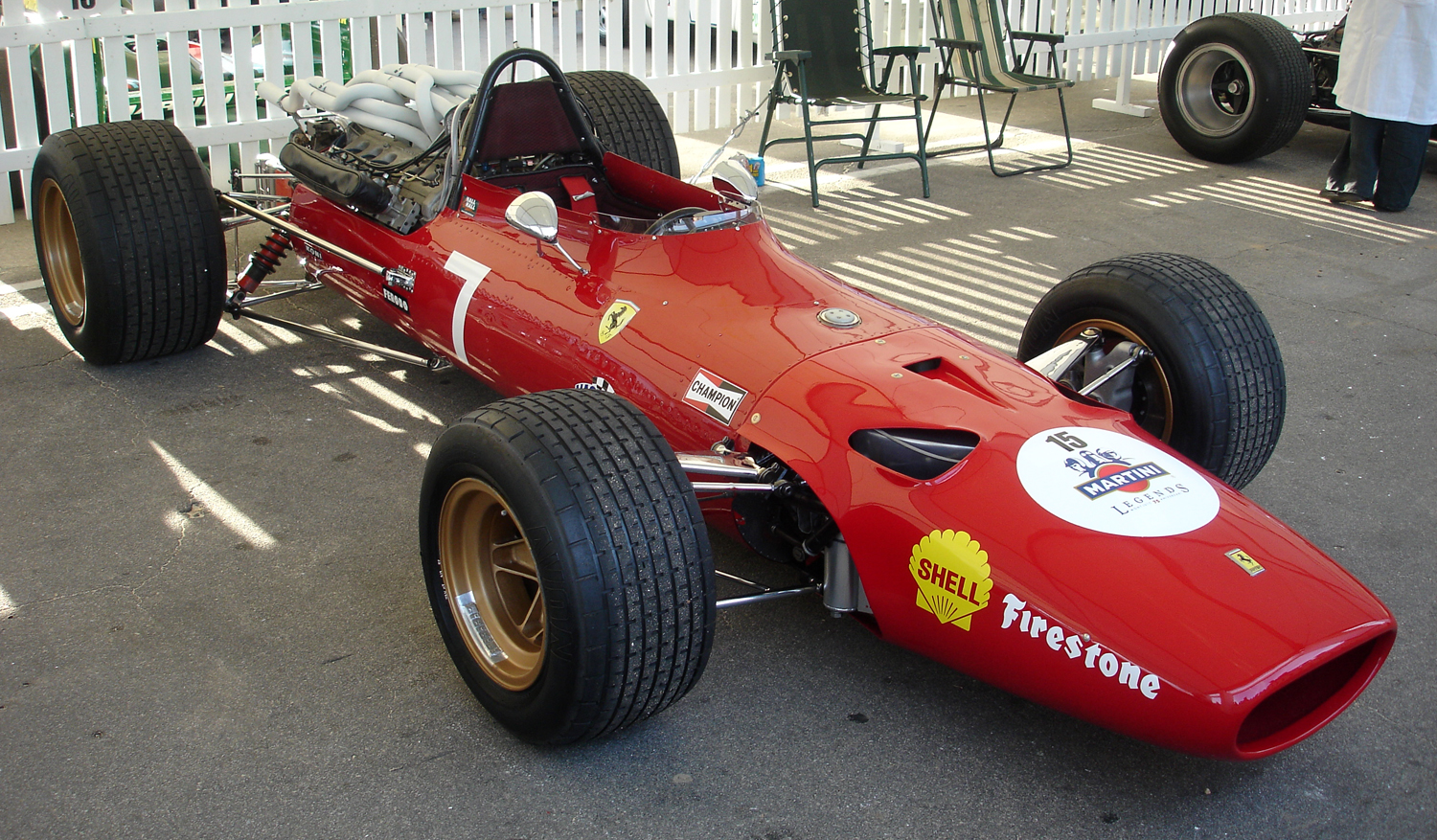
- Category: Formula One
- Constructor: Scuderia Ferrari
- Designer: Mauro Forghieri
- Predecessor: 246 F1-66
- Successor: 312B

Technical specifications
- Chassis: Aluminium monocoque
- Suspension (front): Double wishbone, inboard spring/damper
- Suspension (rear): Twin trailing links, upper lateral links, lower reversed A-arms
- Engine: 2,989 cc (182.4 cu in) 60° V12 naturally aspirated mid-engine, longitudinally mounted
- Transmission: Ferrari Type 589 5-speed manual
- Fuel: Shell
- Tyres: Early '66 Dunlop; Mid '66-69 Firestone

Competition history
- Notable entrants: Scuderia Ferrari
- Notable drivers: (Italy) Lorenzo Bandini (United Kingdom) John Surtees (Italy) Ludovico Scarfiotti (New Zealand) Chris Amon (Belgium) Jacky Ickx
- Debut: 1966 Monaco Grand Prix
Races	Wins	Poles	F/Laps
38	3	7	3
- Constructors' Championships: 0
- Drivers' Championships: 0
- Unless otherwise stated, all data refer to Formula One World Championship Grands Prix only.

The Ferrari 312 F1 was the designation of the 3 litre V-12 (hence 312) Formula One cars raced by the Italian team from 1966 to 1969.

== Overview ==
=== Naming ===
Designed under the leadership of Mauro Forghieri, there were two distinct variations using this designation, the 1966 version and the completely different 1967-69 version. The '66 cars carried on the chassis numbering sequence from the previous year's 1.5 litre cars, while the '67 cars began a new sequence at "0001". To avoid confusion, the cars are commonly referred to as 312 F1-66, 312 F1-67 etc.

=== 1966 ===
For the 1966 Formula One season, there was a change in the technical regulations, now allowing 3 litre engines. The F1 teams, even though asking for "the return to power", were more or less surprised and not well prepared.

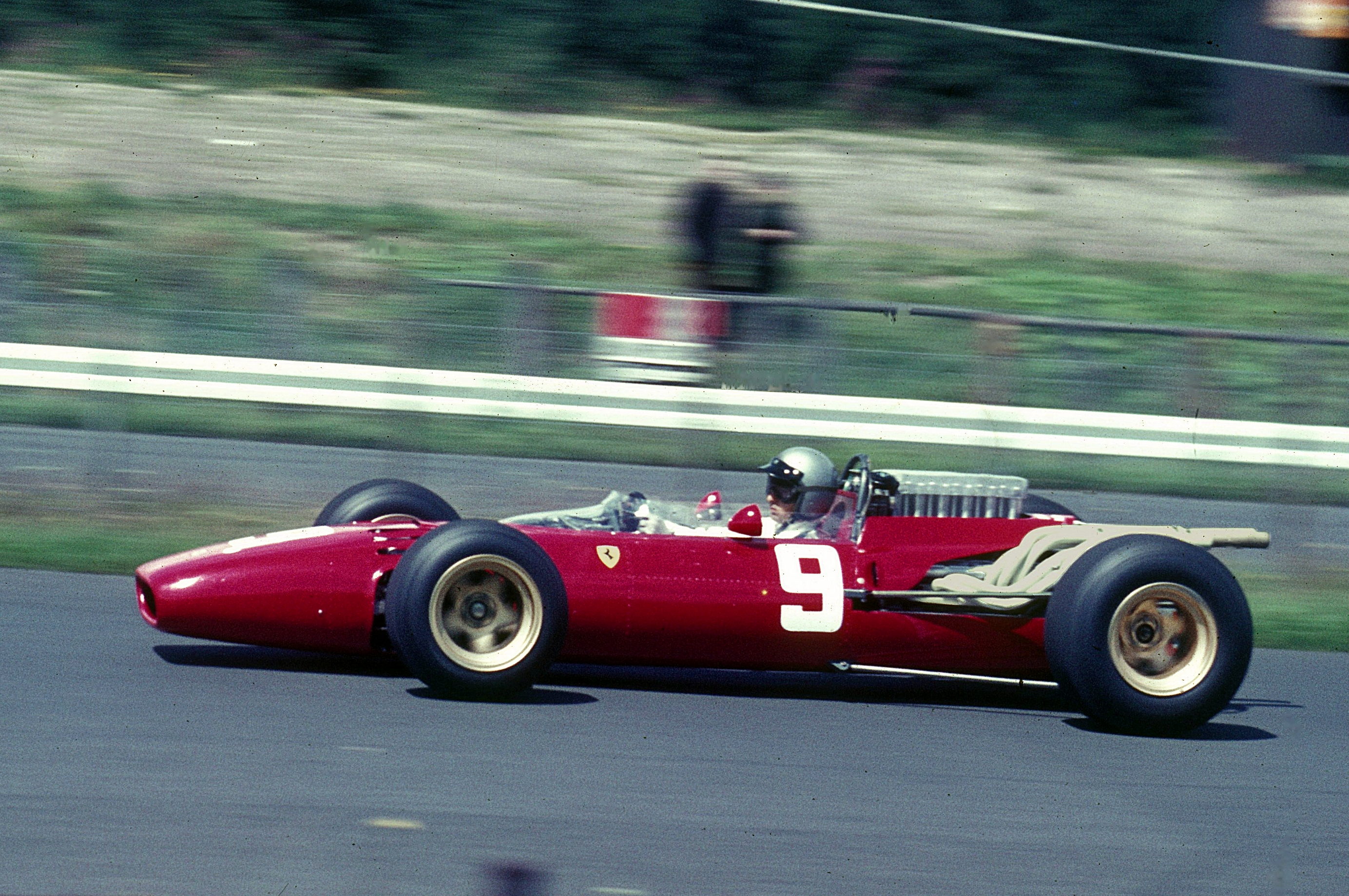
Lorenzo Bandini (1935–1967) at the 1966 German Grand Prix.

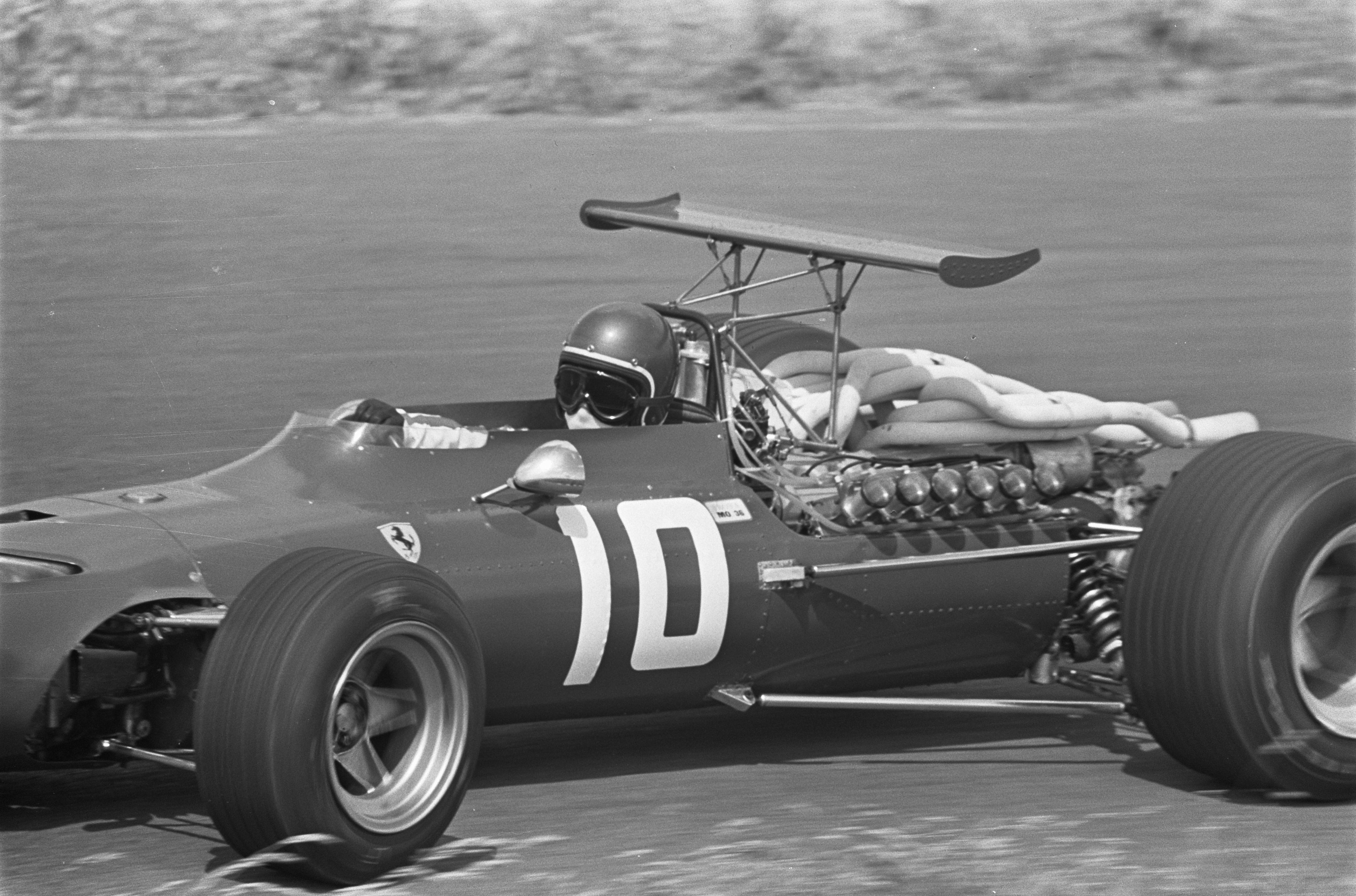
Jacky Ickx at the 1968 Dutch Grand Prix.

Ferrari's first 1966 car consisted of a 3.3-litre V12 engine that was taken from the Ferrari 275P2 sportscar prototypes, thus made to last endurance race up to 24 hours. Reduced to 3000cc, it was mounted in the back of an F1 chassis. The designation 312, which would be used for a number of later cars, indicated a 3-litre, 12-cylinder engine. The engine was rather heavy, and due to the reduced capacity, even lower on power and especially torque as in the sportscar. John Surtees drove this contraption unsuccessfully in Monaco while Lorenzo Bandini drove a Ferrari Dino 2.4-litre V6. Surtees won the second race, the 1966 Belgian Grand Prix, a track that favoured power with its long straights, but the 1964 champion departed after a row with manager Eugenio Dragoni a week later at the 24 Hours of Le Mans. The issue was about priorities in racing, as Ferrari was under pressure from Ford GT40 in sports car racing, and the F1 effort was somewhat neglected. Mike Parkes replaced Surtees, who went to Cooper which used Maserati engines, to finish second in the driver championship with a further win. For Ferrari, Ludovico Scarfiotti also won another fast race, the 1966 Italian Grand Prix at Monza, which helped Ferrari finish second in the Constructors' Championship.

=== 1967 ===
In 1967, the team fired Dragoni and replaced him with Franco Lini. Chris Amon partnered Bandini to drive a somewhat improved version of the 1966 V12 car. At the 1967 Monaco Grand Prix, Bandini crashed and suffered heavy injuries when he was trapped under his burning car; several days later he succumbed to his injuries. Ferrari re-hired Mike Parkes, but Parkes suffered career-ending injuries weeks later at the 1967 Belgian Grand Prix. Several accidents, a fatality, no race win, and only 5th in the Constructors' Championship marked a bad year for Ferrari. In addition, the new Ford Cosworth DFV engine that had its debut in the Lotus 49 would dominate F1 in the 15 years to come.

=== 1968 ===
Ferrari 312/68 at Goodwood Festival of Speed 2010

The 1968 season continued Ferrari's poor performance. New driver Jacky Ickx won the wet 1968 French Grand Prix, but had few other successes. Things became more complicated during the season due to the introduction of aerodynamic devices into F1, and their quick development. At the end of the season, Scuderia Ferrari finished 4th in the Constructors' Championship. Manager Franco Lini quit, and so did Ickx, moving to Brabham. To provide for the future, during the summer of 1968, Enzo Ferrari worked out a deal to sell his road car business to Fiat for $11 million; the transaction took place in early 1969, leaving 50% of the business still under control of Ferrari himself.

=== 1969 ===
During 1969 Enzo Ferrari set about wisely spending his new-found wealth to revive his struggling team; though Ferrari did compete in Formula One in 1969, it was something of a throwaway season while the team was restructured. Ferrari rejoined sportscar racing with the Ferrari 312P, but in March and April 1969, Porsche unexpectedly had presented 25 Porsche 917 for homologation as 5-litre sportscars, which would dominate on fast tracks over the few 3-litre prototypes that were entered by Alfa, Matra, Ford, Alpine and Porsche itself, using the Porsche 908 on twisty circuits. Thus, in addition to the Ferrari 312P, the Scuderia in 1969 also invested a lot of "FIAT money" to build 25 Ferrari 512S sportscars up front to be competitive in the 1970 World Sportscar Championship, without being able to sell all of them to customers.

With Ickx gone, Amon continued as a one-driver-team, in an older model, for the first five races, suffering four DNF and taking 3rd at the 1969 Dutch Grand Prix. Pedro Rodríguez joined for the 1969 British Grand Prix, but with two cars failing to finish, the Scuderia decided to skip the 1969 German Grand Prix, and Amon left Europe to race the Ferrari 612P in the 1969 Can-Am season. Rodríguez took 6th place at Monza for the Scuderia, then finished the season as NART entry in three overseas GP.

At the end of the year the team once again had no race wins and was only ranked 5th in the Constructors' Championship.

The 312 V12 was succeeded by the flat-engine 312B "Boxer" which was introduced for the 1970 Formula One season.

== Technical data ==
Technical data	312 F1-66	312 F1-67	312 F1-68
Engine:	Mid-mounted 60° 12-cylinder V-engine
displacement:	2989 cm^{3}
Bore x stroke:	77.0 x 53.5 mm
Compression:	11.8:1
Max power at rpm:	360 hp at 10 000 rpm	390 hp at 10 000 rpm	410 hp at 11 000 rpm
Valve control:	Dual Overhead Camshafts per cylinder bank
Valves per cylinder:	2 pcs	3 pcs	4 pcs
Fuel system:	Lucas fuel injection
Gearbox:	5-speed manual
suspension front:	Upper cross link, lower triangle link, coil springs
suspension rear:	Upper transverse link, lower triangular link, double longitudinal links, coil springs, anti-roll bars
Brakes:	Hydraulic disc brakes
Chassis & body:	Self-supporting monocoque
Wheelbase:	240 cm
Dry weight:	600 kg	550 kg	510 kg

== Formula One World Championship results ==
(key) (results in bold indicate pole position; results in italics indicate fastest lap)

Year	Entrant	Engine	Tyres	Drivers	1	2	3	4	5	6	7	8	9	10	11	12	Points	WCC
1966	Scuderia Ferrari	Ferrari 3.0 V12	**F** **D**		MON	BEL	FRA	GBR	NED	GER	ITA	USA	MEX				**31**^{1}	2nd
1966	Scuderia Ferrari	Ferrari 3.0 V12	**F** **D**	John Surtees	Ret	**1**											**31**^{1}	2nd
1966	Scuderia Ferrari	Ferrari 3.0 V12	**F** **D**	Lorenzo Bandini			**NC**		6	6	Ret	Ret					**31**^{1}	2nd
1966	Scuderia Ferrari	Ferrari 3.0 V12	**F** **D**	Mike Parkes			2		Ret	Ret	**2**						**31**^{1}	2nd
1966	Scuderia Ferrari	Ferrari 3.0 V12	**F** **D**	Ludovico Scarfiotti							1						**31**^{1}	2nd
1967	Scuderia Ferrari	Ferrari 3.0 V12	**F**		RSA	MON	NED	BEL	FRA	GBR	GER	CAN	ITA	USA	MEX		**20**	5th
1967	Scuderia Ferrari	Ferrari 3.0 V12	**F**	Lorenzo Bandini		Ret											**20**	5th
1967	Scuderia Ferrari	Ferrari 3.0 V12	**F**	Chris Amon		3	4	3	Ret	3	3	6	7	Ret	9		**20**	5th
1967	Scuderia Ferrari	Ferrari 3.0 V12	**F**	Mike Parkes			5	Ret									**20**	5th
1967	Scuderia Ferrari	Ferrari 3.0 V12	**F**	Ludovico Scarfiotti			6	NC									**20**	5th
1967	Scuderia Ferrari	Ferrari 3.0 V12	**F**	Jonathan Williams											8		**20**	5th
1968	Scuderia Ferrari	Ferrari 3.0 V12	**F**		RSA	ESP	MON	BEL	NED	FRA	GBR	GER	ITA	CAN	USA	MEX	**32**	4th
1968	Scuderia Ferrari	Ferrari 3.0 V12	**F**	Jacky Ickx	Ret	Ret		3	4	1	3	**4**	3	DNS		Ret	**32**	4th
1968	Scuderia Ferrari	Ferrari 3.0 V12	**F**	Chris Amon	4	**Ret**		**Ret**	**6**	10	2	Ret	Ret	Ret	Ret	Ret	**32**	4th
1968	Scuderia Ferrari	Ferrari 3.0 V12	**F**	Andrea de Adamich	Ret												**32**	4th
1968	Scuderia Ferrari	Ferrari 3.0 V12	**F**	Derek Bell									Ret		Ret		**32**	4th
1969	Scuderia Ferrari	Ferrari 3.0 V12	**F**		RSA	ESP	MON	NED	FRA	GBR	GER	ITA	CAN	USA	MEX		**7**	6th
1969	Scuderia Ferrari	Ferrari 3.0 V12	**F**	Chris Amon	Ret	Ret	Ret	3	Ret	Ret							**7**	6th
1969	Scuderia Ferrari	Ferrari 3.0 V12	**F**	Ernesto Brambilla								DNS					**7**	6th
1969	Scuderia Ferrari	Ferrari 3.0 V12	**F**	Pedro Rodríguez						Ret		6					**7**	6th
1969	North American Racing Team	Ferrari 3.0 V12	**F**	Pedro Rodríguez									Ret	5	7		**7**	6th

== PC Simulation ==
In 1998, a drivable, detailed virtual recreation of the 1967 Ferrari 312 appeared as one of the leading cars in Grand Prix Legends (GPL), a PC-based simulation of the 1967 F1 championship. The 1966 version was part of a free 66 Mod for GPL, which was introduced in 2007. It included further refined driving physics. The 1968 and 1969 cars, which feature wings for added downforce, appear in the respective season mods as well. In 2017, the 1967 version was included in the Ferrari 70th Anniversary Celebration Pack for Assetto Corsa.

== Popularity ==
In 2011, TheF1Times.com rated the 312 as being "the most beautiful Formula One car of all time", stating "Ferrari's 312 remains in some opinions as one of the most aesthetically-pleasing Formula One cars of not only the 1960s, but of all time."
