= Brabham BT37 =

Formula One racing car

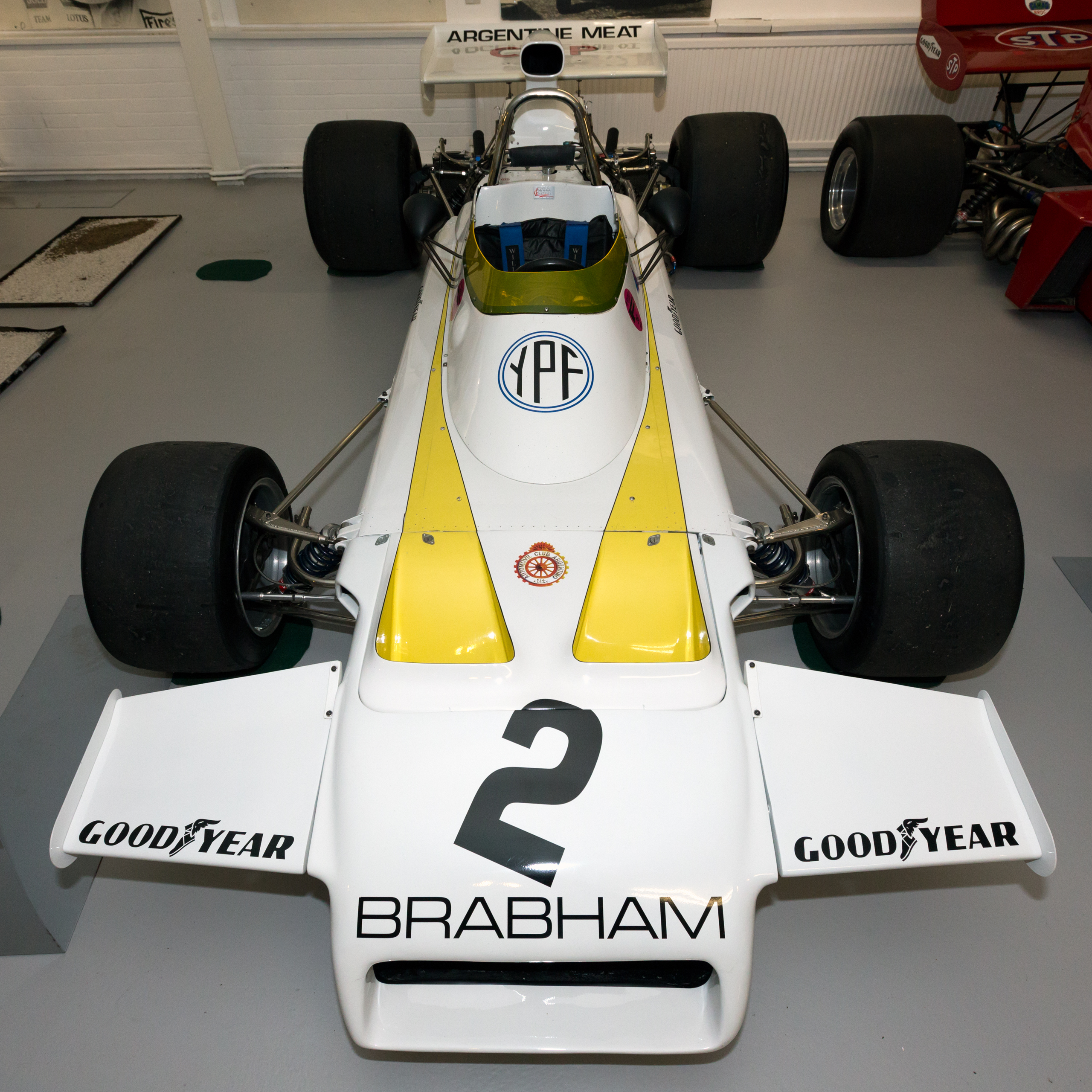
- The BT37 on display at Donington
- Category: Formula One
- Constructor: Brabham
- Designer(s): Ralph Bellamy
- Predecessor: BT34
- Successor: BT42

Technical specifications
- Chassis: Aluminum Monocoque
- Engine: Cosworth DFV 2993 cc 90 Degree V-8 Naturally Aspirated Mid-Engined
- Transmission: Hewland FG400 5 Forward, 1 Reverse
- Weight: 600 kg (1,322.8 lb)
- Fuel: Esso, Bardahl
- Tyres: Goodyear

Competition history
- Notable entrants: Motor Racing Developments; Ceramica Pagnossin
- Notable drivers: (United Kingdom) Graham Hill (Argentina) Carlos Reutemann (Brazil) Wilson Fittipaldi (Italy) Andrea de Adamich (United Kingdom) John Watson
- Debut: 1972 Spanish Grand Prix
Races	Wins	Podiums	Poles	F/Laps
18	0	0	0	0
- Constructors' Championships: 0
- Drivers' Championships: 0

The Brabham BT37 was a Formula One racing car designed by Ralph Bellamy for the Brabham team to use in the 1972 Formula One season. It was relatively unsuccessful compared to Brabham's earlier and later cars such as the BT19 or the BT44. In the 18 races it was fielded, it collected no wins, no pole positions and no fastest laps. The best results were two fourth place-finishes for Carlos Reutemann and Andrea de Adamich. It generally achieved poor qualifying results, the best being fifth for Reutemann on two occasions.

In 1974 and 1975, it also raced at the RAC British Hill Climb Championship. It is also notable for giving John Watson his Formula 1 debut in 1973.

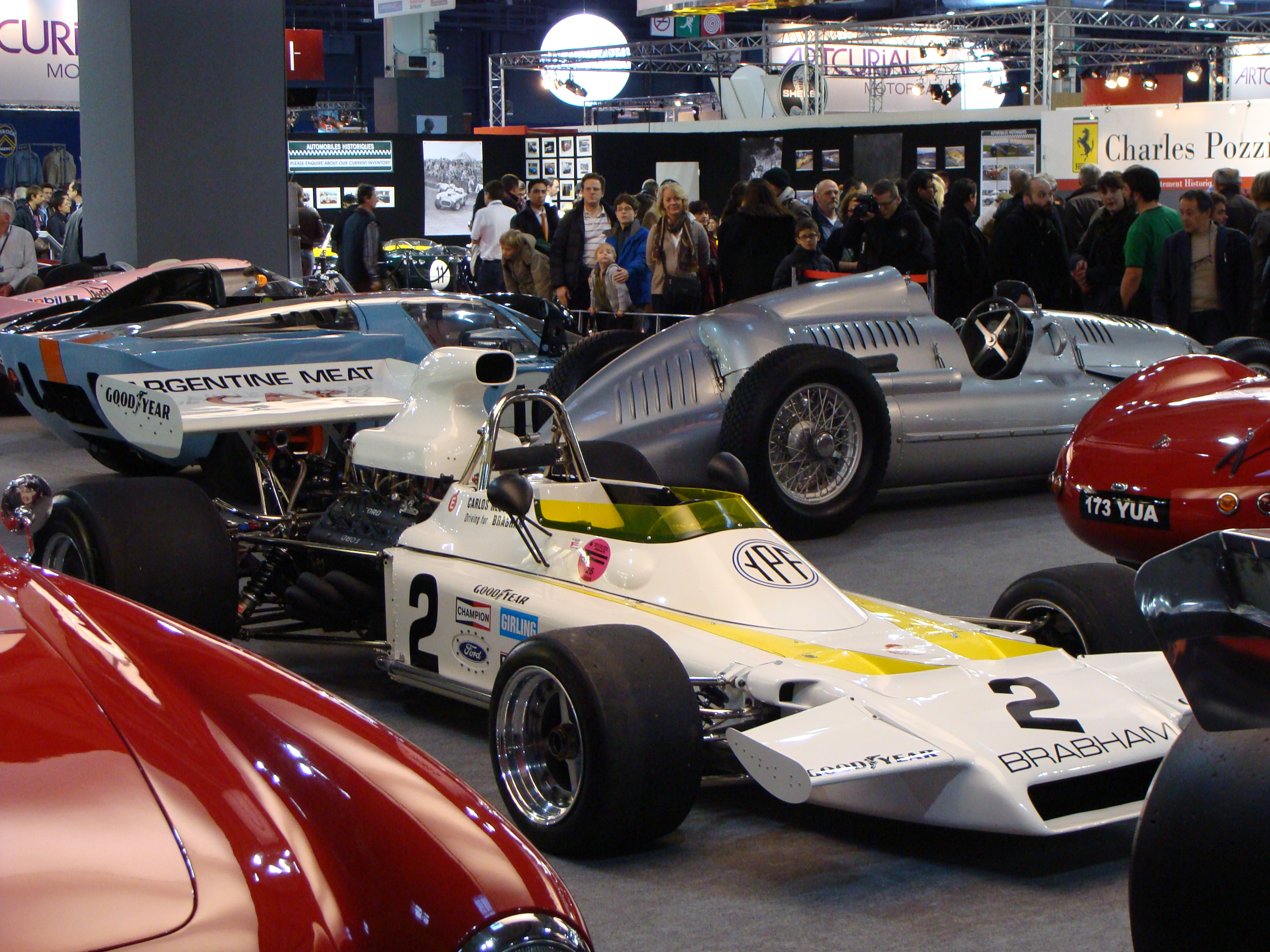
Brabham BT37 at Rétromobile 2012

== Complete Formula One World Championship results ==
(key) (results in bold indicate pole position, results in italics indicate fastest lap)

Year	Entrant	Drivers	1	2	3	4	5	6	7	8	9	10	11	12	13	14	15	Points	WCC
1972	Motor Racing Developments		ARG	RSA	ESP	MON	BEL	FRA	GBR	GER	AUT	ITA	CAN	USA				**7***	9th
1972	Motor Racing Developments	Graham Hill			10	12	Ret	10	Ret	6	Ret	5	8	11				**7***	9th
1972	Motor Racing Developments	Carlos Reutemann					13	12	8	Ret	Ret	Ret	4	Ret				**7***	9th
1973	Motor Racing Developments		ARG	BRA	RSA	ESP	BEL	MON	SWE	FRA	GBR	NED	GER	AUT	ITA	CAN	USA	**22***	4th
1973	Motor Racing Developments	Carlos Reutemann	Ret	11	7													**22***	4th
1973	Motor Racing Developments	Wilson Fittipaldi	6	Ret	Ret													**22***	4th
1973	Ceramica Pagnossin Team	Andrea de Adamich				Ret	4	7		Ret								**22***	4th
1973	Ceramica Pagnossin Team	John Watson									Ret	DNS	DNS					**22***	4th

* Total points scored by all Brabham cars
