= Brabham BT2 =

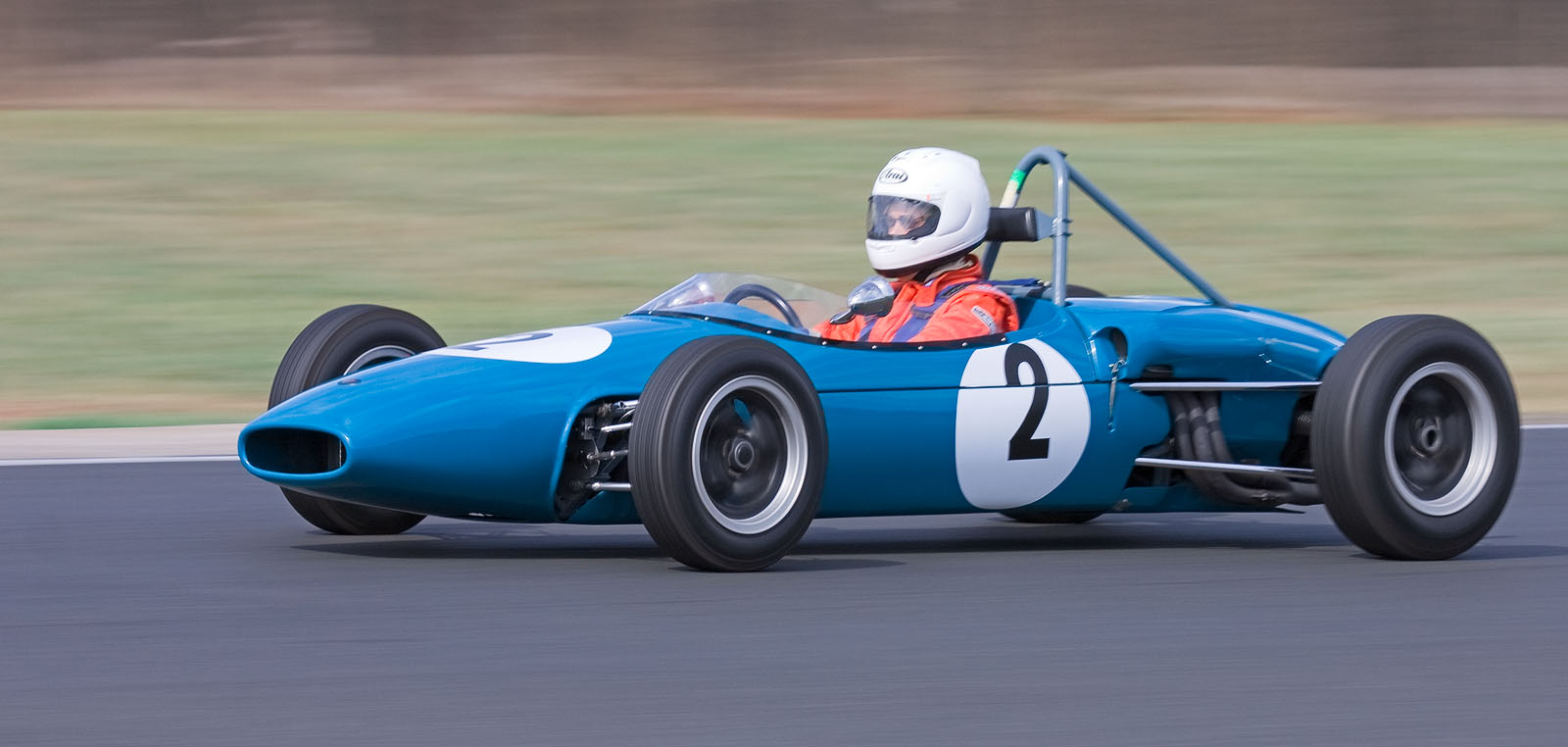
- Category: Formula Junior
- Production: 1962; 11 cars built
- Predecessor: Brabham BT1
- Successor: Brabham BT6

Technical specifications
- Chassis: Steel tubular space frame
- Engine: Ford-Cosworth 109E
- Transmission: 4-speed manual
- Brakes: Disc brakes

Competition history
- Notable drivers: (France) Jo Schlesser

The Brabham BT2 is an open-wheel racing car made by Brabham in 1962.

== Development ==
After leaving the Cooper stable in 1961, Jack Brabham joined forces with Ron Tauranac to open his own car team. This team was initially called MRD (Motor Racing Developments), but since the sound produced by the pronunciation of the initials was similar to that of a swear word in French, it was decided to change the name to that of its founder. The first car built was the BT2, a single-seater designed to compete in the Formula Junior category.

== Design ==
Produced in 11 units, the BT2 exploited a tubular steel frame in a spaceframe configuration wrapped in a fiberglass body. The engine used was a Ford-Cosworth 109E derived from the Ford Anglia with 103 hp and managed by a four-speed manual gearbox. The braking system consisted of four disc brakes, while the suspensions were double wishbones with coaxial coil springs and stabilizer bar in the front section and wishbones, double link arms, coil springs, and stabilizer bar in the rear.

Subsequently, in 1963, the BT2 was updated and transformed into the BT6, of which 20 additional examples were built. The Ford-Cosworth 109E engine was boosted to 110 hp (82 kW).

== Racing history ==
The BT2 was used in 1962 in the Formula Junior championship by drivers such as Frank Gardner and Jo Schlesser, who achieved excellent results, including the first victory of the English team achieved by Schlesser.

In 1963, when the BT6 was deployed, the victories began to arrive numerous thanks to the work of Denny Hulme and Jo Schlesser. It was the last season spent by the English team in Formula Junior, as the next car, the BT9, was designed to compete in Formula 3.
