= Ferrari 312B =

Formula One racing car

Ferrari 312B Ferrari 312B2 Ferrari 312B3 Ferrari 312B3-74
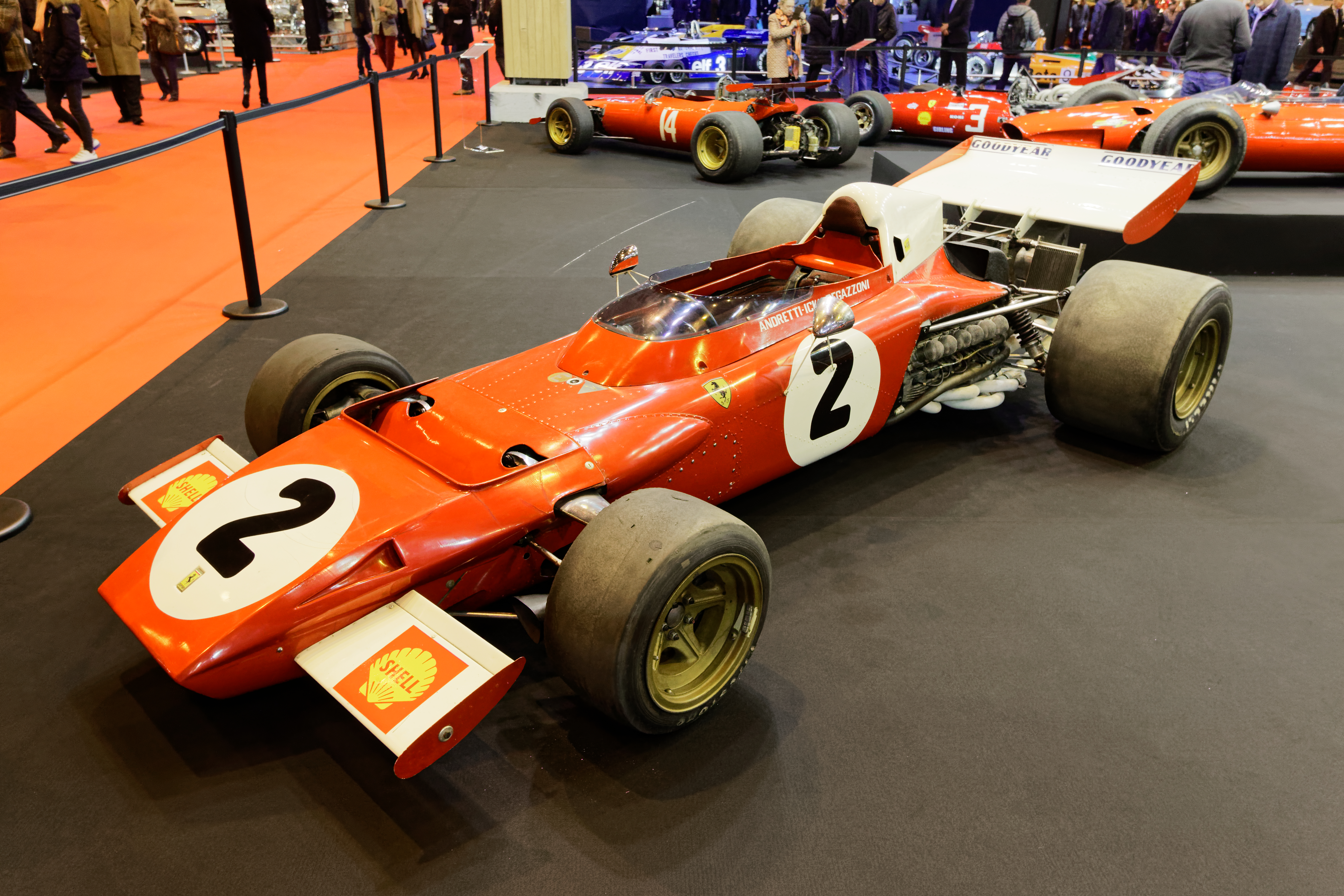
- Ferrari 312 B2 of 1972
- Category: Formula One
- Constructor: Scuderia Ferrari
- Designer: Mauro Forghieri
- Predecessor: 312
- Successor: 312T

Technical specifications
- Chassis: Aluminium monocoque
- Suspension (front): Double wishbone, inboard spring/damper
- Suspension (rear): Double wishbone suspension
- Engine: Ferrari Tipo 001 2,992 cc (182.6 cu in) Flat-12 naturally aspirated mid-engine, longitudinally mounted
- Transmission: Ferrari Type 621 5-speed manual
- Fuel: Shell; Agip
- Tyres: 1970–72: Firestone; 1973–75: Goodyear

Competition history
- Notable entrants: Scuderia Ferrari
- Notable drivers: (United States) Mario Andretti (Austria) Niki Lauda (Switzerland) Clay Regazzoni (Belgium) Jacky Ickx
- Debut: 1970 South African Grand Prix (312B); 1971 Monaco Grand Prix (312B2); 1973 Spanish Grand Prix (312B3)
Races	Wins	Poles	F/Laps
70 (all models); 19 (312B); 24 (312B2/B2-72); 27 (312B3)	10; 5; 2; 3	22; 6; 6; 10	21; 11; 4; 6
- Constructors' Championships: 1 (1975)
- Drivers' Championships: 1 (1975, Niki Lauda)
- Unless otherwise stated, all data refer to Formula One World Championship Grands Prix only.

The Ferrari 312B is a Formula One racing car designed and built by Scuderia Ferrari. It was the successor to the Ferrari 312 and was used from 1970 until early 1975. The original 312B was developed into the 312B2 and 312B3.

== History ==
The early 1970s saw the return of success to the Scuderia; the unlucky Chris Amon left, while Jacky Ickx returned and was joined by Clay Regazzoni. Under the direction of Mauro Forghieri, Ferrari developed a new Tipo 001 flat-12 engine, colloquially referred to as a "boxer" (although not a real boxer engine), giving a lower center of gravity and a clear airflow beneath the rear wing.

Ferrari 312 B3S Spazzaneve

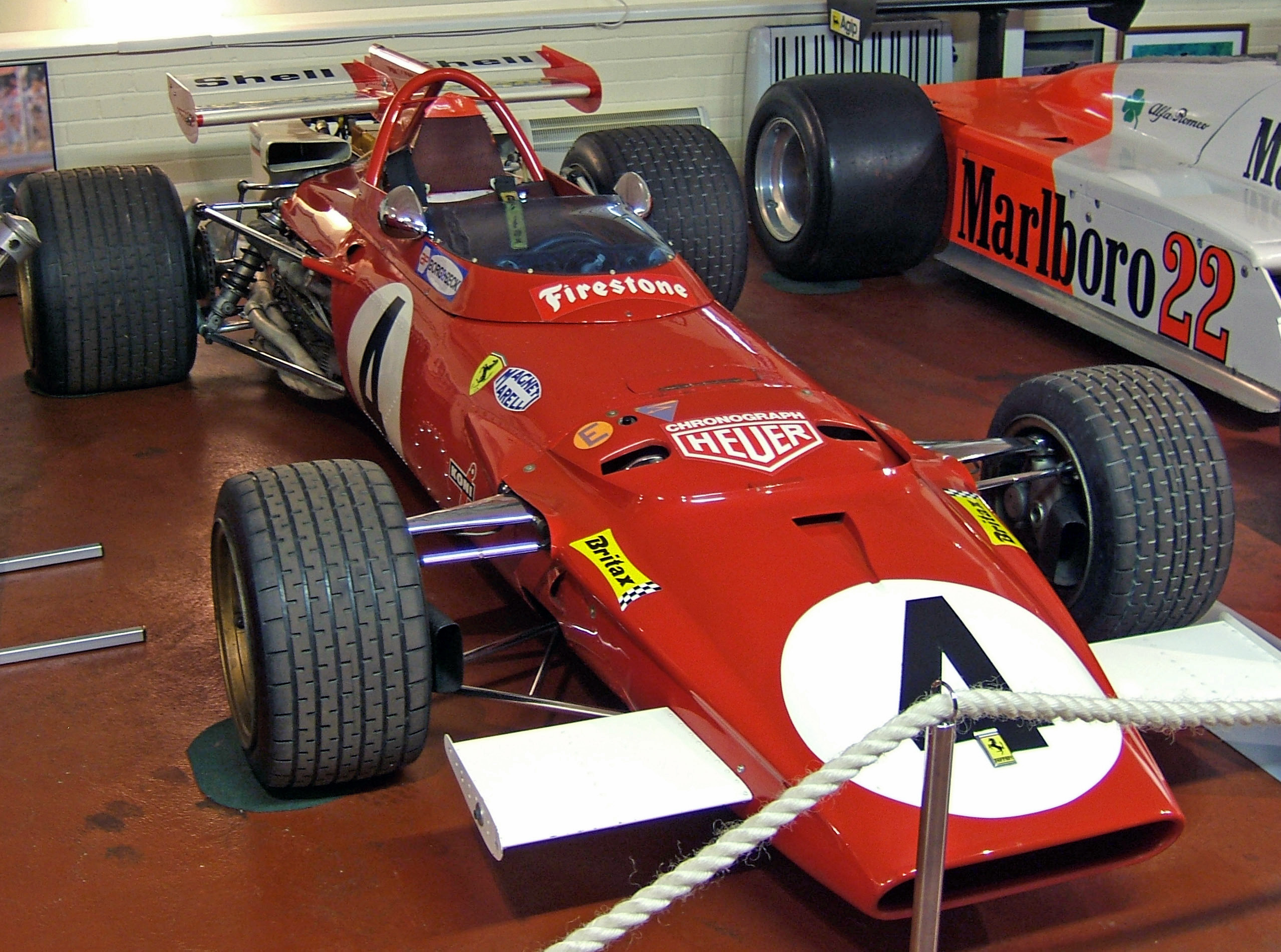
A 1970 Ferrari 312B

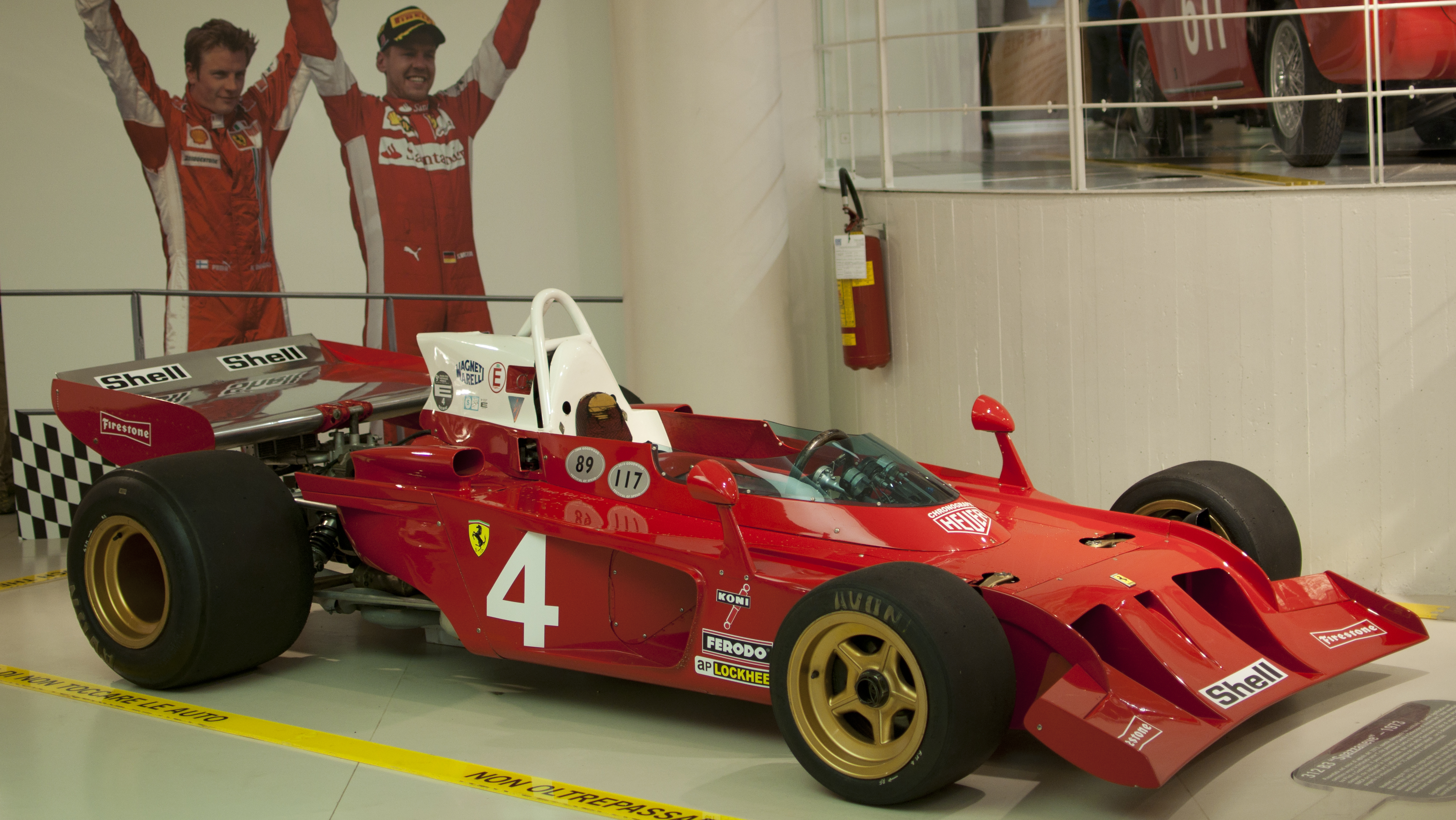
The 'snow plow' Ferrari 312 B3 at the Ferrari Museum

During the car's first season, in 1970, Ickx battled with Lotus's Jochen Rindt and won three Grands Prix, while the Italian Grand Prix was won by Clay Regazzoni, following the death of Rindt in a practice session preceding the race. In the remaining races, Ickx could not close the points gap to Rindt for the drivers title, and Lotus won the Constructors Championship ahead of Ferrari.

The 1971 season started with a win by new signing Mario Andretti. Although being presented in January, the 312 B2 debuted at the third round in Monaco, followed by the Dutch Grand Prix success for Ickx. However the B2 suffered with handling problems: the combination of the innovative rear suspension and the new Firestone tyres gave severe vibrations when driven close to the limit. Forghieri designed and fitted winglets to the front wings of the car for the British Grand Prix that year; however these were not seen again afterwards. Ferrari ultimately came third in the Constructors Championship, as Jackie Stewart and Tyrrell dominated the season.

In 1972 Ferrari fielded a revised B2 with a more conventional rear suspension, but could not keep up with the progress of the competition, dropping to fourth at the end of the year. Ickx won the 1972 German Grand Prix at the Nürburgring, but this was to be his last GP win.

During the season, Forghieri experimented with a new front bodywork that was very similar to the front bodywork of the Tyrrell 003; it was tested and fitted to the cars for the second race in South Africa that year, however it was not used again afterwards due to it making the cars uncompetitive. Forghieri also designed a radical new car featuring a square bodywork and full width nose on a very short wheelbase. This new 312 B3 was tested by Merzario and Ickx but never raced in a Grand Prix. The Italian press nicknamed it the spazzaneve (snowplow).

For 1973, FIAT executives imposed a new technical staff and Forghieri was transferred to the experimental department; his role was taken by Sandro Colombo, a former Gilera and Innocenti engineer. The spazzaneve project was discarded and replaced by a new design, still named 312 B3. A new full monocoque chassis was built by specialist English company TC Prototypes, under John Thompson's guidance, and the engine became a fully stressed member.

In the first races, Ferrari still used the old 312 B2: the car was no longer competitive, and Ickx only managed one fourth place at the opening GP of the season. The new 312 B3 debuted at the Spanish Grand Prix, but proved to be slow and unreliable achieving even worse results. Throughout the 1973 season, Ferrari was outclassed, and they even skipped some Grands Prix, notably the Nürburgring. Ickx left the team halfway through the season in order to contest the 1973 German Grand Prix at the Nürburgring in a McLaren, where he took 3rd place behind the Tyrrells of Stewart and François Cevert, despite being given an older-spec Ford Cosworth V8 and the hardest compound of tyres available.

During the summer Forghieri was recalled as technical director and set about revising the B3 incorporating some of the ideas used on his radical spazzaneve.

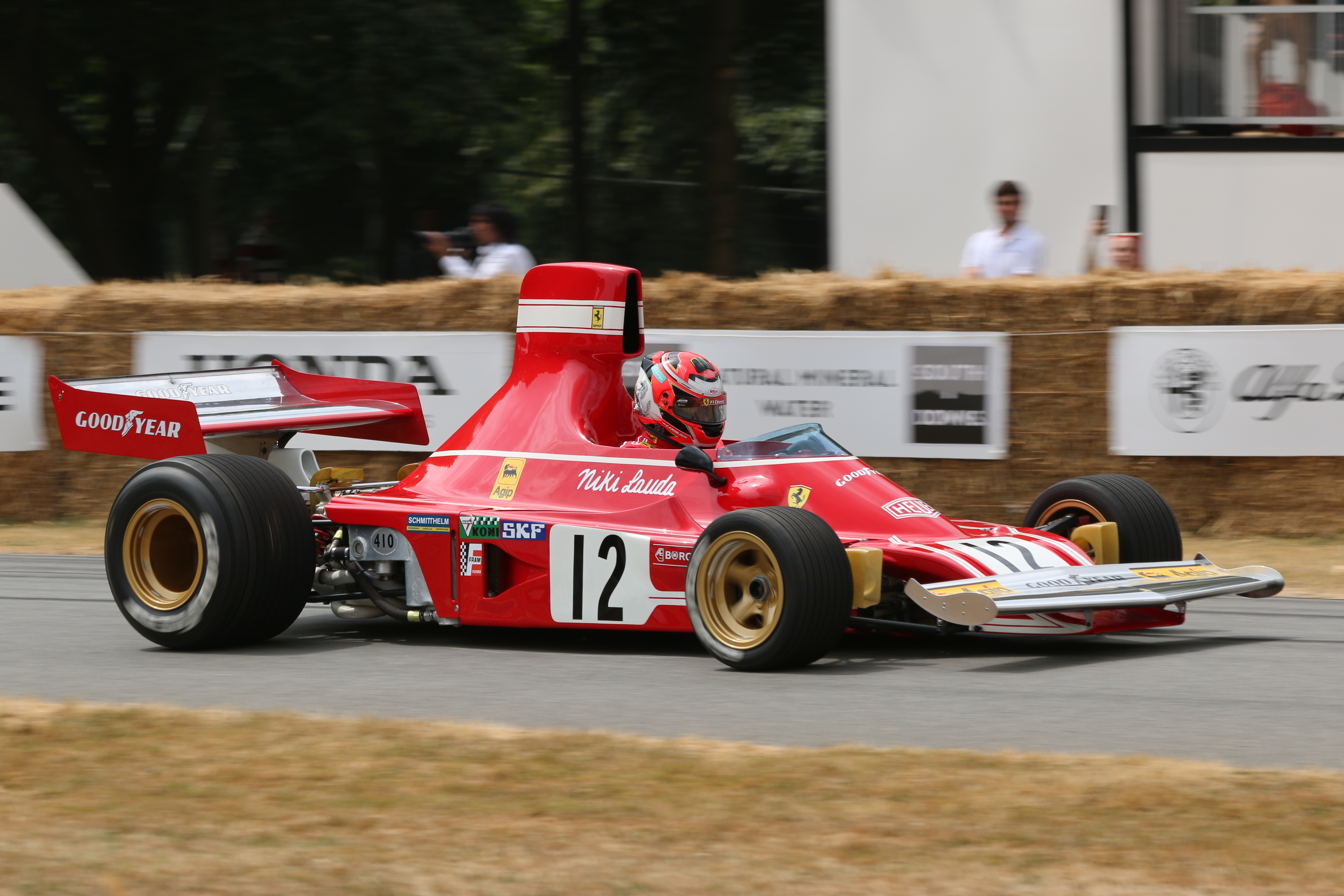
312B3-74 in Goodwood Festival of Speed 2018

For 1974 Ferrari fielded a heavily revised car, named 312 B3-74, and signed BRM drivers Niki Lauda and Clay Regazzoni.

The car was succeeded by the 312T which was introduced for the 1975 Formula One season.

== Technical data ==
Technical data	312B	312B2	312B3
Engine:	Mid-mounted 180° 12-cylinder V-engine
displacement:	2991 cm³	2992 cm³
Bore x stroke:	78.5 x 51.5 mm	80.0 x 49.6 mm
Compression:	11.5:1
Max power at rpm:	450 hp at 12 000 rpm	470 hp at 12 600 rpm	490 hp at 12 500 rpm
Valve control:	Double Overhead Camshafts per cylinder bank, 4 valves per cylinder
Fuel system:	Lucas fuel injection
Gearbox:	5-speed manual
suspension front:	Upper cross link, lower triangle link, coil springs	Double triangle links, coil springs
suspension rear:	Upper transverse link, lower triangular link, double longitudinal links, coil springs, anti-roll bars
Brakes:	Hydraulic disc brakes
Chassis & body:	Self-supporting monocoque
Wheelbase:	238 cm		251 cm
Dry weight:	535 kg	560 kg	580 kg

== Complete Formula One World Championship results ==
Year	Chassis	Tyres	Driver	1	2	3	4	5	6	7	8	9	10	11	12	13	14	15	Points	WCC
1970	312B	F		RSA	ESP	MON	BEL	NED	FRA	GBR	GER	AUT	ITA	CAN	USA	MEX			52 (55)	2nd
1970	312B	F	Jacky Ickx	Ret	Ret	Ret	8	3	Ret	Ret	2	1	Ret	1	4	1			52 (55)	2nd
1970	312B	F	Clay Regazzoni					4		4	Ret	2	1	2	13	2			52 (55)	2nd
1970	312B	F	Ignazio Giunti				4		14			7	Ret						52 (55)	2nd
1971	312B	F		RSA	ESP	MON	NED	FRA	GBR	GER	AUT	ITA	CAN	USA					33	3rd
1971	312B	F	Jacky Ickx	8	2							Ret		Ret					33	3rd
1971	312B	F	Clay Regazzoni	3	Ret														33	3rd
1971	312B	F	Mario Andretti	1	Ret	DNQ	Ret												33	3rd
1971	312B2	F	Jacky Ickx			3	1	Ret	Ret	Ret	Ret		8						33	3rd
1971	312B2	F	Clay Regazzoni			Ret	3	Ret	Ret	3	Ret	Ret	Ret	6					33	3rd
1971	312B2	F	Mario Andretti							4			13	DNS					33	3rd
1972	312B2	F		ARG	RSA	ESP	MON	BEL	FRA	GBR	GER	AUT	ITA	CAN	USA				33	4th
1972	312B2	F	Jacky Ickx	3	8	2	2	Ret	11	Ret	1	Ret	Ret	12	5				33	4th
1972	312B2	F	Clay Regazzoni	4	12	3	Ret	Ret			2	Ret	Ret	5	8				33	4th
1972	312B2	F	Mario Andretti	Ret	4	Ret							7		6				33	4th
1972	312B2	F	Nanni Galli						13										33	4th
1972	312B2	F	Arturo Merzario							6	12								33	4th
1973	312B2	G		ARG	BRA	RSA	ESP	BEL	MON	SWE	FRA	GBR	NED	GER	AUT	ITA	CAN	USA	12	6th
1973	312B2	G	Jacky Ickx	4	5	Ret													12	6th
1973	312B2	G	Arturo Merzario	9	4	4													12	6th
1973	312B3	G	Jacky Ickx				12	Ret	Ret	6	5	8				8			12	6th
1973	312B3	G	Arturo Merzario						Ret		7				7	Ret	15	16	12	6th
1974	312B3-74	G		ARG	BRA	RSA	ESP	BEL	MON	SWE	NED	FRA	GBR	GER	AUT	ITA	CAN	USA	65	2nd
1974	312B3-74	G	Clay Regazzoni	3	2	Ret	2	4	4	Ret	2	3	4	1	5	Ret	2	11	65	2nd
1974	312B3-74	G	Niki Lauda	2	Ret	16	1	2	Ret	Ret	1	2	5	Ret	Ret	Ret	Ret	Ret	65	2nd
1975	312B3-74	G		ARG	BRA	RSA	ESP	MON	BEL	SWE	NED	FRA	GBR	GER	AUT	ITA	USA		72.5^{1}	1st
1975	312B3-74	G	Clay Regazzoni	4	4														72.5^{1}	1st
1975	312B3-74	G	Niki Lauda	6	5														72.5^{1}	1st

^{1} In 1975, 63.5 points were scored driving the Ferrari 312T.
