= Williams FW04 =

Formula One motor racing car

Williams FW04 Wolf–Williams FW04 McGuire BM1
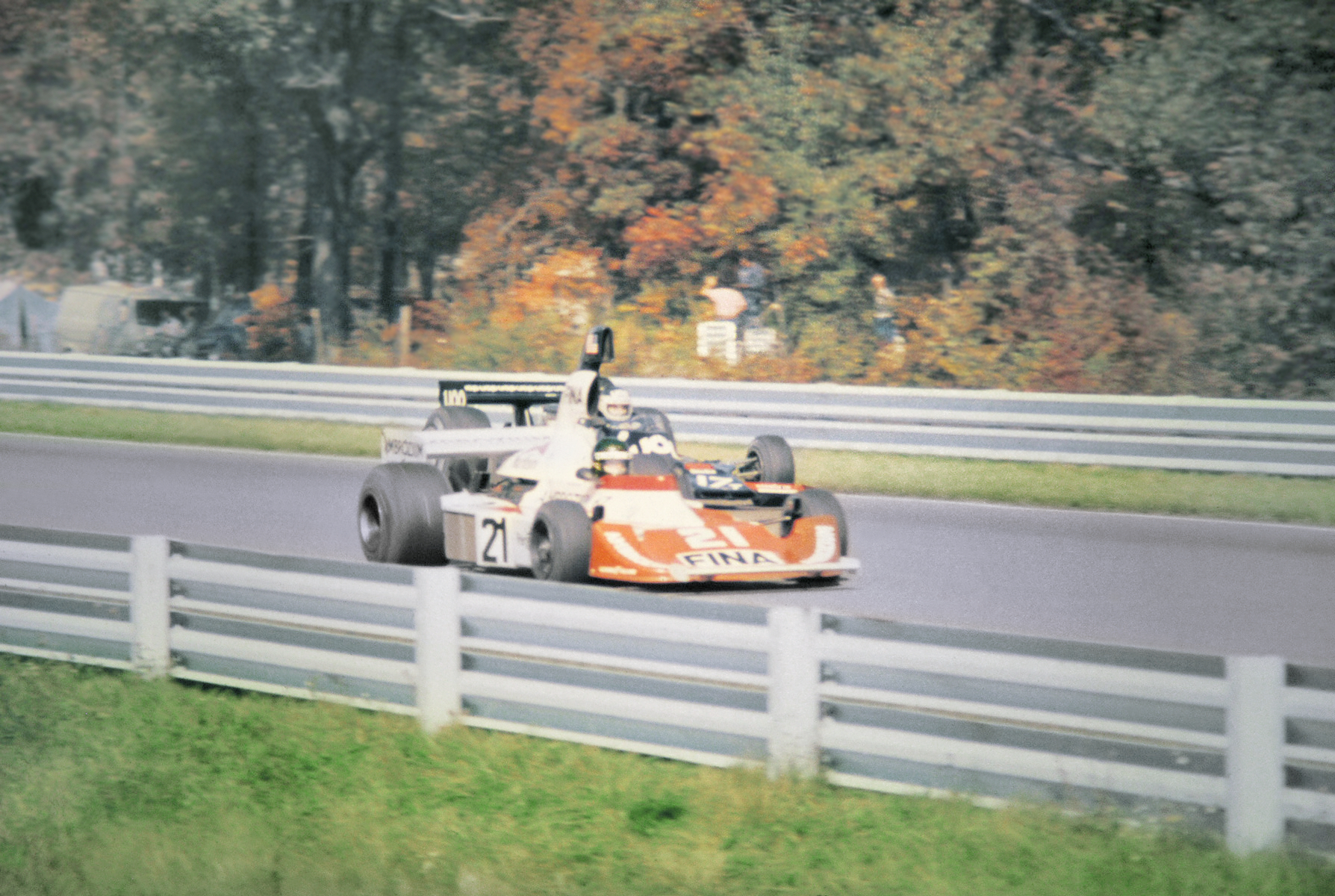
- Laffite in the FW04 ahead of Jean-Pierre Jarier in the Shadow at the 1975 United States Grand Prix
- Category: Formula One
- Constructor: Williams / Wolf–Williams / McGuire
- Designers: Ray Stokoe; Patrick Head
- Predecessor: Williams FW
- Successor: Wolf–Williams FW05 / Williams FW06

Technical specifications
- Chassis: Aluminium monocoque, with engine as a fully stressed member.
- Axle track: 1,570 mm (62 in)
- Wheelbase: 2,540 mm (100 in)
- Engine: Ford Cosworth DFV 2,993 cc (182.6 cu in) 90° V8, naturally aspirated, mid-mounted.
- Transmission: Hewland FG 400 5-speed Manual.
- Weight: 591 kg (1,302.9 lb)
- Fuel: FINA
- Lubricants: FINA
- Tyres: Goodyear

Competition history
- Notable entrants: Frank Williams Racing Cars; Wolf–Williams Racing
- Notable drivers: (France) Jacques Laffite (South Africa) Ian Scheckter (Italy) Renzo Zorzi (Italy) Arturo Merzario
- Debut: 1975 Spanish Grand Prix
Races	Wins	Poles	F/Laps
15	0	0	0
- Unless otherwise stated, all data refer to Formula One World Championship Grands Prix only.

The Williams FW04 (later the Wolf–Williams FW04) was a Formula One car used by Frank Williams Racing Cars during the 1975 season and Wolf–Williams Racing during the 1976 season. The car was a development of the Williams FW and two were built. Although not a particularly successful car, an FW04 finished second at the 1975 German Grand Prix.

== Concept ==
The car was designed by former McLaren designer Ray Stokoe. Frank Williams took the decision to build his own chassis design for the first time; as a result, the FW04 was the first completely independently developed car to carry the Williams name. Prior entries had either been customer cars or designed by an external company. However the new design was an evolution of the previous Williams FW chassis. The FW suffered from excessive bodyroll. As a result, the new car was considerably narrower and more streamlined than its predecessor and had its radiators and fuel tanks repositioned for better aerodynamic performance and handling over the earlier car. Fina were signed as major sponsors with additional funds from a Swiss finance company, Ambrosium. Most significantly, Williams hired a young engineer for the new season. His name was Patrick Head, who would become one of the driving forces of the team in the years to come. The FW04 suffered from overheating issues and fuel pick up problems, so Head redesigned both systems at short notice, which greatly improved performance.

The new Williams appeared partway into the 1975 season. While Jacques Laffite liked it, Arturo Merzario did not rate the car at all, preferring to drive the old FW. Although the FW04 was not particularly competitive, the 1975 German Grand Prix saw the car's best finish. A race of attrition benefitted Laffite and he brought the car home second for Frank Williams' best ever result to that point. The timing was financially good as it kept the cash strapped outfit solvent, although it would be the team's only finish in the points all season. Money was so tight that Williams was forced to buy second hand spares from other teams. The nose of the FW04 came from the Hesketh 308.

In 1976, both FW04s were sold to Australian driver Brian McGuire, who raced them in the Shellsport International Series, winning one round at Thruxton. He also made modifications to the cars and renamed them the McGuire BM1. McGuire was killed in one of these cars at Brands Hatch in August 1977.

== Racing history ==
=== 1975 ===
For the first three races of the 1975 season, Frank Williams Racing Cars were still using the FW, and the new FW04 was not ready until the 1975 Spanish Grand Prix. Only one car was built at first, and it was raced alongside the older FW03 throughout the rest of the season. Williams was operating on a low budget and was occasionally even forced to buy used tyres from other teams.

On its debut in Spain, the FW04 was driven by Italian Arturo Merzario with young British driver Tony Brise in the FW03 on a one-race deal. Brise outqualified Merzario (18th and 25th) and Merzario withdrew from the race protesting that the barriers at the Montjuich circuit were not bolted together properly. Later Rolf Stommelen's rear wing failed and he crashed into the crowd, killing five people. Brise finished seventh. In Monaco, Jacques Laffite returned to the team to take Brise's place, and the Frenchman drove the FW04 with Merzario in the FW03. Neither driver qualified for the race, as they were classified 19th (Laffite) and 20th (Merzario) and only 18 cars were permitted to start the race. At the Belgian Grand Prix, Laffite qualified 17th in the FW04 but retired from the race with gearbox failure. In Sweden, Laffite was absent again as he was driving in Formula Two, and Merzario had left the team, so Damien Magee and Ian Scheckter were brought in to replace them. Scheckter started 20th in the FW04 but crashed out of the race after a tyre failure.

Laffite drove the FW04 for the rest of the season while the FW03 was driven by a string of drivers on short deals. At the Dutch Grand Prix, Laffite started 15th but retired with engine failure, although in France he qualified 16th and finished 11th, the first race finish for the FW04. At the British Grand Prix, Laffite qualified 19th and retired early in the race with another gearbox failure.

The team's fortunes improved at the German Grand Prix, although Laffite qualified down in 15th. During the race several cars dropped out through mechanical failures and accidents, while others suffered punctures and were delayed. Laffite was able to finish second after overtaking Tom Pryce near the end, earning six World Championship points for the team. However, in Austria, Laffite qualified 12th but dropped out of the race with handling problems. Laffite also drove the FW04 in the non-championship Swiss Grand Prix, starting 13th and finishing tenth, and another gearbox failure ended his Italian Grand Prix after starting down in 18th.

By the time of the season-ending US Grand Prix, a second FW04 had been built, although both cars failed to start. Laffite had qualified 21st but was unfit to race, while Italian Lella Lombardi suffered ignition problems in the new FW04 (chassis "02") and was unable to start having qualified 24th. Williams finished the season in ninth place in the Constructors' Championship with six points, and all had been scored by Laffite in the FW04 in Germany.

=== 1976 ===
At the start of the 1976 season, Canadian oil millionaire Walter Wolf bought 60% of Frank Williams Racing Cars and the team became Wolf–Williams Racing. However, Frank Williams was retained as team manager. The team inherited the 308C car used by Hesketh Racing during the final races of 1975, rebranding it as the Wolf–Williams FW05. The FW04 was similarly rebranded as the Wolf–Williams FW04, although it was only used in the opening race of the season, the 1976 Brazilian Grand Prix. Laffite had left the team and two new drivers were brought in; Renzo Zorzi drove the FW04 (chassis "01"), outqualifying Jacky Ickx in the FW05 (17th and 19th), and both cars finished the race with Ickx eighth and Zorzi ninth. After this race, Wolf–Williams had two FW05s at their disposal and so the FW04 was put aside. Chassis "01" was then sold to Australian driver Brian McGuire.

McGuire entered his FW04 in the 1976 Shellsport International Series, finishing third in Round 6 at Brands Hatch before winning Round 10 at Thruxton. McGuire started from pole position and secured the fastest lap of the race on his way to victory, the first time a Williams car had managed any of these feats. He eventually finished eighth in the Championship standings.

He also entered the car in the 1976 BRDC International Trophy in April, qualifying last and being black-flagged in the race after losing oil on the circuit.

McGuire's FW04 also appeared at the 1976 Spanish Grand Prix in early May, driven by local driver Emilio Zapico, entered under the Mapfre–Williams team name. With only 24 cars permitted to start the race, Zapico qualified 27th and so missed out.

In July, McGuire attempted to enter the 1976 British Grand Prix but was denied entry by the race organisers. He subsequently bought the second FW04 from Wolf–Williams, the car that Lella Lombardi had driven at the 1975 United States Grand Prix, while continuing to run chassis "01" in the Shellsport Series.

=== 1977 ===
For 1977, McGuire modified his FW04s and renamed them as McGuire BM1s. Entering chassis "01" in the first four rounds of the 1977 Shellsport International Series, he failed to finish a race, dropping out very early in all of them. Switching to chassis "02", he fared little better with more early retirements before a fifth-place finish in Round 8 at Oulton Park on 9 July.

He then entered chassis "01" in the 1977 British Grand Prix and this time was allowed to take part, but he failed to progress beyond the special pre-qualifying session.

Returning to the Shellsport Series with chassis "02", he suffered another early retirement in Round 10 before competing at Brands Hatch in Round 11 at the end of August. During a practice run for this race, the FW04 / BM1 left the track and hit the barriers, killing McGuire and a fire marshal.

== Race results ==
=== Complete Formula One World Championship results ===
(key)

Year	Entrant	Chassis	Engine	Tyres	Drivers	1	2	3	4	5	6	7	8	9	10	11	12	13	14	15	16	17	WCC	Pts.
1975	Frank Williams Racing Cars	Williams FW04	Ford Cosworth DFV 3.0 V8	G		ARG	BRA	RSA	ESP	MON	BEL	SWE	NED	FRA	GBR	GER	AUT	ITA	USA				9th	6
1975	Frank Williams Racing Cars	Williams FW04	Ford Cosworth DFV 3.0 V8	G	Arturo Merzario				Ret														9th	6
1975	Frank Williams Racing Cars	Williams FW04	Ford Cosworth DFV 3.0 V8	G	Jacques Laffite					DNQ	Ret		Ret	11	Ret	2	Ret	Ret	DNS				9th	6
1975	Frank Williams Racing Cars	Williams FW04	Ford Cosworth DFV 3.0 V8	G	Ian Scheckter							Ret											9th	6
1975	Frank Williams Racing Cars	Williams FW04	Ford Cosworth DFV 3.0 V8	G	Lella Lombardi														DNS				9th	6
1976	Wolf–Williams Racing	Wolf–Williams FW04	Ford Cosworth DFV 3.0 V8	G		BRA	RSA	USW	ESP	BEL	MON	SWE	FRA	GBR	GER	AUT	NED	ITA	CAN	USE	JPN		—	0
1976	Wolf–Williams Racing	Wolf–Williams FW04	Ford Cosworth DFV 3.0 V8	G	Renzo Zorzi	9																	—	0
1976	Mapfre–Williams	Williams FW04	Ford Cosworth DFV 3.0 V8	G	Emilio Zapico				DNQ														—	0
1976	Brian McGuire	Williams FW04	Ford Cosworth DFV 3.0 V8	G	Brian McGuire									DNP									—	0
1977	Brian McGuire	McGuire BM1	Ford Cosworth DFV 3.0 V8	G		ARG	BRA	RSA	USW	ESP	MON	BEL	SWE	FRA	GBR	GER	AUT	NED	ITA	USE	CAN	JPN	—	0
1977	Brian McGuire	McGuire BM1	Ford Cosworth DFV 3.0 V8	G	Brian McGuire										DNPQ								—	0

=== Non-championship Formula One results ===
(key)

Year	Entrant	Engine	Driver	Tyres	1	2	3
1975	Frank Williams Racing Cars	Ford Cosworth DFV		**G**	ROC	INT	SUI
1975	Frank Williams Racing Cars	Ford Cosworth DFV	Jacques Laffite	**G**			10
1976	Brian McGuire	Ford Cosworth DFV		**G**	ROC	INT	
1976	Brian McGuire	Ford Cosworth DFV	Brian McGuire	**G**		Ret	

=== Complete Shellsport International Series results ===
(key) (note: results shown in bold indicate pole position; results in italics indicate fastest lap)

Year	Driver	Chassis	Engine	1	2	3	4	5	6	7	8	9	10	11	12	13	14	Pos.	Pts.
1976	Brian McGuire	Williams FW04	Cosworth V8	MAL	SNE; Ret	OUL; Ret	BRH; Ret	THR; Ret	BRH; 3	MAL; Ret	SNE; Ret	BRH; Ret	**THR**; 1	OUL; DNS	BRH; Ret	BRH		8th	34
1977	Brian McGuire	McGuire BM1	Cosworth V8	MAL; Ret	SNE; DNS	OUL; Ret	BRH; Ret	MAL; Ret	THR; Ret	BRH; Ret	OUL; 5	MAL	DON; Ret	BRH; DNS	THR	SNE	BRH	21st	8
