= Emilio Zapico =

Spanish racing driver (1944–1996)

- Born: 27 May 1944; León, Castile and León, Spain
- Died: 6 August 1996 (aged 52); Huete, Castile-La Mancha, Spain

Formula One World Championship career
- Nationality: (Spain) Spanish
- Active years: 1976
- Team: private Williams
- Entries: 1 (0 starts)
- Championships: 0
- Wins: 0
- Podiums: 0
- Career points: 0
- Pole positions: 0
- Fastest laps: 0
- First entry: 1976 Spanish Grand Prix

Emilio Rodríguez Zapico (27 May 1944 – 6 August 1996) was a Spanish racing driver. He entered one Formula One Grand Prix, the 1976 Spanish Grand Prix, with the then-struggling Williams team, but failed to qualify. The Williams FW04 that Zapico used was already a year old, and it was later used by Brian McGuire.

Zapico later returned to Touring Cars in the 1980s before retiring. Zapico was killed in an aircraft accident, piloting his ultralight in Huete, Spain, on 6 August 1996.

== Racing record ==
=== Complete British Saloon Car Championship results ===
(key) (Races in bold indicate pole position; races in italics indicate fastest lap.)

Year	Team	Car	Class	1	2	3	4	5	6	7	8	9	Pos.	Pts	Class
1973	Rafael Barrios	Ford Escort RS 1600	C	BRH	SIL	THR	THR	SIL	ING	BRH	SIL; 5	BRH	29th	6	7th

=== Complete Formula One results ===
(key)

Year	Entrant	Chassis	Engine	1	2	3	4	5	6	7	8	9	10	11	12	13	14	15	16	WDC	Points
1976	Mapfre Williams	Williams FW04	Cosworth V8	BRA	RSA	USW	ESP; DNQ	BEL	MON	SWE	FRA	GBR	GER	AUT	NED	ITA	CAN	USA	JPN	NC	0
