= McGuire (Formula One) =

Motorsport team

- Full name: McGuire
- Founder(s): Brian McGuire
- Noted drivers: (Australia) Brian McGuire

Formula One World Championship career
- First entry: 1977 British Grand Prix
- Races entered: 1 (no starts)
- Engines: Cosworth V8
- Race victories: 0
- Points: 0
- Pole positions: 0
- Fastest laps: 0
- Final entry: 1977 British Grand Prix

McGuire was a Formula One racing car constructor founded by Australian driver Brian McGuire. The team participated in one Formula One World Championship Grand Prix but failed to qualify.

Brian McGuire first started to race in the British-based Shellsport G8 International Series in 1976, as a private entry with the Formula One-specification Williams FW04. He also entered the car for the 1976 British Grand Prix but was only listed as a reserve and never made it on to the track. For the 1977 season McGuire made extensive modifications to the Williams and it was entered for the 1977 British Grand Prix as the McGuire BM1. However, the car was uncompetitive in the special pre-qualifying sessions, slower than all the other entrants except Mikko Kozarowitzky who had an accident, and McGuire failed to make it through to the full qualifying sessions. Brian McGuire was killed at the wheel of the car at Brands Hatch later in 1977.

== Complete Shellsport International Series results ==
(key) (Races in bold indicate pole position; races in italics indicate fastest lap.)

Year	Chassis	Engine	Driver	1	2	3	4	5	6	7	8	9	10	11	12	13	14	Points	WDC
1976	Williams FW04	Ford Cosworth DFV 3.0 V8	Brian McGuire	MAL	SNE; Ret	OUL; Ret	BRH; Ret	THR; Ret	BRH; 3	MAL; DNQ	SNE; Ret	BRH; Ret	**THR**; 1	OUL; DNS	BRH; Ret	BRH		34	8th
1977	McGuire BM1	Ford Cosworth DFV 3.0 V8	Brian McGuire	MAL; Ret	SNE; DNS	OUL; Ret	BRH; Ret	MAL; Ret	THR; Ret	BRH; Ret	OUL; 5	MAL	DON; Ret	BRH; DNS	THR	SNE	BRH	8	21st

== Complete Formula One World Championship results ==
(key)

Year	Chassis	Engine	Tyres	Driver	No.	1	2	3	4	5	6	7	8	9	10	11	12	13	14	15	16	17	Points	WCC
1977	McGuire BM1	Ford Cosworth V8	**G**			ARG	BRA	RSA	USW	ESP	MON	BEL	SWE	FRA	GBR	GER	AUT	NED	ITA	USA	CAN	JPN	0	NC
1977	McGuire BM1	Ford Cosworth V8	**G**	Brian McGuire	45										DNPQ								0	NC
