= Brian McGuire (racing driver) =

Australian racing driver (1945–1977)

- Born: 13 December 1945; East Melbourne, Victoria, Australia
- Died: 29 August 1977 (aged 31); Brands Hatch, Kent, England, UK

Formula One World Championship career
- Nationality: (Australia) Australian
- Active years: 1977
- Team: McGuire
- Entries: 1 (0 starts)
- Championships: 0
- Wins: 0
- Podiums: 0
- Career points: 0
- Pole positions: 0
- Fastest laps: 0
- First entry: 1977 British Grand Prix
- Last entry: 1977 British Grand Prix

Brian Anthony Joseph McGuire (13 December 1945 – 29 August 1977) was a racing driver and constructor from Australia.

== Racing career and death ==
McGuire travelled over to the UK from Australia with another hopeful young driver, Alan Jones, but did not enjoy his countryman's success. McGuire entered two Formula One British Grands Prix. With his privately run Williams FW04 at the 1976 British Grand Prix, he found himself as a reserve entry and was denied a chance to compete.

For the 1977 race, McGuire modified his Williams FW04 and renamed it the McGuire BM1, but failed to pre-qualify. McGuire was killed practicing this car during a Shellsport G8 Championship race at Brands Hatch later that year.

== Career results ==
=== Complete European F5000 Championship results ===
(key) (Races in bold indicate pole position; races in italics indicate fastest lap.)

Year	Entrant	Chassis	Engine	1	2	3	4	5	6	7	8	9	10	11	12	13	14	15	16	17	18	Pos.	Pts
1974	Brian McGuire	Trojan T101	Chevrolet 5.0 V8	BRH	MAL	SIL; 12	OUL; DNS	BRH	ZOL													18th	25
1974	Brian McGuire	Lola T332	Chevrolet 5.0 V8							THR; Ret	ZAN; Ret	MUG; 8	MNZ; 9	MAL; 9	MON	THR; Ret	BRH; DNS	OUL; DNS	SNE; 3	MAL; DNS	BRH; 8	18th	25
1975	Brian McGuire	Lola T332	Chevrolet 5.0 V8	BRH; NC	OUL; Ret	BRH; 6	SIL; 9	ZOL; Ret	ZAN; DNS	THR; 7	SNE; 6	MAL; Ret	THR; 7	BRH; Ret	OUL; DNS	SIL	SNE	MAL; Ret	BRH; Ret			17th	22

=== Complete Shellsport International Series results ===
(key) (Races in bold indicate pole position; races in italics indicate fastest lap.)

Year	Entrant	Chassis	Engine	1	2	3	4	5	6	7	8	9	10	11	12	13	14	Pos.	Pts
1976	Brian McGuire	Williams FW04	Ford Cosworth DFV 3.0 V8	MAL	SNE; Ret	OUL; Ret	BRH; Ret	THR; Ret	BRH; 3	MAL; DNQ	SNE; Ret	BRH; Ret	**THR**; 1	OUL; DNS	BRH; Ret	BRH		8th	34
1977	Brian McGuire	McGuire BM1	Ford Cosworth DFV 3.0 V8	MAL; Ret	SNE; DNS	OUL; Ret	BRH; Ret	MAL; Ret	THR; Ret	BRH; Ret	OUL; 5	MAL	DON; Ret	BRH; DNS	THR	SNE	BRH	21st	8

=== Complete Formula One World Championship results ===
(key) (Races in bold indicate pole position, races in italics indicate fastest lap)

Year	Entrant	Chassis	Engine	1	2	3	4	5	6	7	8	9	10	11	12	13	14	15	16	17	WDC	Pts
1977	Brian McGuire	McGuire BM1	Ford Cosworth DFV 3.0 V8	ARG	BRA	RSA	USW	ESP	MON	BEL	SWE	FRA	GBR; DNPQ	GER	AUT	NED	ITA	USA	CAN	JPN	NC	0

=== Complete non-championship Formula One results ===
(key) (Races in bold indicate pole position, races in italics indicate fastest lap)

Year	Entrant	Chassis	Engine	1	2	3
1974	Brian McGuire	Trojan T101 (F5000)	Chevrolet 5.0 V8	PRE	ROC	INT; DNS
1976	Brian McGuire	Williams FW04	Ford Cosworth DFV 3.0 V8	ROC	INT; DSQ	

Preceded by Tom Pryce	Formula One fatal accidents 29 August 1977	Succeeded by Ronnie Peterson
