= Karl Oppitzhauser =

Austrian racing driver (born 1941)

- Born: 4 October 1941 (age 85); Bruck an der Leitha, Lower Austria, Austria

Formula One World Championship career
- Nationality: (Austria) Austrian
- Active years: 1976
- Team: non-works March
- Entries: 1 (0 starts)
- Championships: 0
- Wins: 0
- Podiums: 0
- Career points: 0
- Pole positions: 0
- Fastest laps: 0
- First entry: 1976 Austrian Grand Prix

Karl Oppitzhauser (born 4 October 1941) is a former racing driver from Austria. He is chiefly known for his optimistic attempt to enter the 1976 Formula One Austrian Grand Prix.

== Career ==
Oppitzhauser began his career in Formula Vee in the 1960s, and also raced a Lotus Europa. By 1968 he had progressed to a Ferrari Dino, and later a Lamborghini Miura, before competing in the Alfasud Cup in the mid-1970s.

In 1976, Oppitzhauser attempted to enter the Austrian Grand Prix with the local ÖASC Racing Team, driving a March 761, despite having little experience in single seater racing cars. Due to this lack of experience, both Oppitzhauser and his teammate Otto Stuppacher were refused entry to the event. Unlike Stuppacher, Oppitzhauser did not make any further attempts at Formula One.

After his Formula One attempt, Oppitzhauser entered a Brands Hatch round of the Shellsport G8 Formula 5000 Championship, but did not start the race. He switched to touring car racing, and competed with a BMW 635CSi in Group 5.

During the early 1980s, Oppitzhauser changed sports, trying his hand at harness racing, before returning to touring cars in 1984, where he stayed until 1992. From 1995 to 1999, he participated in the Ferrari 355 Challenge, then switched to a Ferrari 360 Modena, winning the European Group 2 Ferrari Challenge in 2001. He subsequently moved up to the Group 1 Ferrari Challenge. His last Ferrari Challenge entry came at Imola in 2017, finishing 22nd in the amateur class.

Oppitzhauser now runs a Chrysler, Jeep, Dodge and Hyundai dealership in his home town of Bruck.

== Racing record ==
=== Complete World Sportscar Championship results ===
(key) (Races in bold indicate pole position) (Races in italics indicate fastest lap)

Year	Entrant	Class	Chassis	Engine	1	2	3	4	5	6	7	Pos.	Pts
1976	Egon Evertz KG	GT	Porsche 934	Porsche 930/71 3.0 F6t	MUG	VAL	SIL	NÜR	ÖST; 11	GLN	DIJ	(Note: In 1976 and 1977 the World Championship was divided into two series that ran simultaneously but separately: The World Sportscar Championship and the World Championship for Makes.)	

Footnotes

=== Complete Formula One World Championship results ===
(key)

Year	Entrant	Chassis	Engine	1	2	3	4	5	6	7	8	9	10	11	12	13	14	15	16	WDC	Pts
1976	Sports Cars of Austria	March 761	Ford Cosworth DFV 3.0 V8	BRA	RSA	USW	ESP	BEL	MON	SWE	FRA	GBR	GER	AUT; DNP	NED	ITA	CAN	USA	JPN	NC	0

=== Complete Shellsport International Series results ===
(key) (Races in bold indicate pole position; races in italics indicate fastest lap.)

Year	Entrant	Chassis	Engine	1	2	3	4	5	6	7	8	9	10	11	12	13	Pos.	Pts
1976	Sports Cars of Austria	March 761	Ford Cosworth DFV 3.0 V8	MAL	SNE	OUL	BRH	THR	BRH	MAL	SNE	BRH; DNQ	THR	OUL	BRH	BRH	NC	0
