= 1976 Austrian Grand Prix =

Race 11 of 16 in the 1976 Formula One season
← Previous race	Next race →
- The Österreichring (1969–76)

Race details
- Date: 15 August 1976
- Official name: XIV Raiffeisen Großer Preis von Österreich
- Location: Österreichring; Spielberg, Styria, Austria
- Course: Permanent racing facility
- Course length: 5.911 km (3.673 miles)
- Distance: 54 laps, 319.914 km (198.342 miles)

Pole position
Driver	(United Kingdom) James Hunt	McLaren-Ford
- Time: 1:35.02

Fastest lap
Driver	(United Kingdom) James Hunt	McLaren-Ford
- Time: 1:35.91 (lap record)

Podium
First	(United Kingdom) John Watson	Penske-Ford
Second	(France) Jacques Laffite	Ligier-Matra
Third	(Sweden) Gunnar Nilsson	Lotus-Ford

The 1976 Austrian Grand Prix was a Formula One motor race held at the Österreichring on 15 August 1976. It was the eleventh race of the 1976 World Championship of F1 Drivers and the 1976 International Cup for F1 Constructors.

The 54-lap race was won by John Watson, driving a Penske-Ford. As well as being Watson's first F1 victory, it was also the only F1 victory for the Penske team, coming a year after the death of their former driver Mark Donohue at the same circuit. Roger Penske would withdraw from F1 at the end of the season to concentrate on Indycars.

Jacques Laffite finished second in a Ligier-Matra, with Gunnar Nilsson third in a Lotus-Ford. Drivers' Championship challenger James Hunt finished fourth in his McLaren-Ford, having started from pole position.

Local drivers Otto Stuppacher and Karl Oppitzhauser had applied to enter the event, but were refused due to their lack of experience. They had entered under the ÖASC Racing Team banner, with Stuppacher bringing a Tyrrell 007 to the circuit, and Oppitzhauser a March 761. They petitioned the other teams for support, but none was forthcoming and hence they did not participate.

With local hero Niki Lauda still in hospital following his near-fatal accident at the Nürburgring two weeks previously, and Ferrari not entering the race in protest at the reinstatement of Hunt as the winner of the Spanish Grand Prix, there was talk that the race would be cancelled. In the event, the race went ahead, but was attended by fewer spectators than usual.

As of 2026, this remains the last World Championship race that Ferrari did not enter and the last time an American-licensed constructor won a F1 race. This would also be the last occasion to date that a female driver would not only qualify for but also finish a Grand Prix with Lella Lombardi qualifying 24th and finishing four laps down in 12th place in a RAM Racing entered Brabham.

== Qualifying ==
=== Qualifying classification ===
Pos.	Driver	Constructor	Time	No
1	James Hunt	McLaren-Ford	1:35.02	1
2	John Watson	Penske-Ford	1:35.84	2
3	Ronnie Peterson	March-Ford	1:36.34	3
4	Gunnar Nilsson	Lotus-Ford	1:36.46	4
5	Jacques Laffite	Ligier-Matra	1:36.52	5
6	Tom Pryce	Shadow-Ford	1:36.56	6
7	Vittorio Brambilla	March-Ford	1:36.59	7
8	Carlos Pace	Brabham-Alfa Romeo	1:36.66	8
9	Mario Andretti	Lotus-Ford	1:36.68	9
10	Jody Scheckter	Tyrrell-Ford	1:36.91	10
11	Hans-Joachim Stuck	March-Ford	1:36.95	11
12	Jochen Mass	McLaren-Ford	1:37.22	12
13	Patrick Depailler	Tyrrell-Ford	1:37.24	13
14	Carlos Reutemann	Brabham-Alfa Romeo	1:37.24	14
15	Alan Jones	Surtees-Ford	1:37.60	15
16	Brett Lunger	Surtees-Ford	1:37.62	16
17	Emerson Fittipaldi	Copersucar-Ford	1:37.76	17
18	Jean-Pierre Jarier	Shadow-Ford	1:37.88	18
19	Hans Binder	Ensign-Ford	1:38.36	19
20	Harald Ertl	Hesketh-Ford	1:39.09	20
21	Arturo Merzario	Wolf-Williams-Ford	1:39.33	21
22	Henri Pescarolo	Surtees-Ford	1:39.84	22
23	Alessandro Pesenti-Rossi	Tyrrell-Ford	1:40.67	23
24	Lella Lombardi	Brabham-Ford	1:42.25	24
25	Loris Kessel	Brabham-Ford	1:56.01	25

== Race ==
=== Classification ===
Pos	No	Driver	Constructor	Laps	Time/Retired	Grid	Points
1	28	(United Kingdom) John Watson	Penske-Ford	54	1:30:07.86	2	9
2	26	(France) Jacques Laffite	Ligier-Matra	54	+ 10.79	5	6
3	6	(Sweden) Gunnar Nilsson	Lotus-Ford	54	+ 11.98	4	4
4	11	(United Kingdom) James Hunt	McLaren-Ford	54	+ 12.44	1	3
5	5	(United States) Mario Andretti	Lotus-Ford	54	+ 21.49	9	2
6	10	(Sweden) Ronnie Peterson	March-Ford	54	+ 34.34	3	1
7	12	(Germany) Jochen Mass	McLaren-Ford	54	+ 59.45	12	
8	24	(Austria) Harald Ertl	Hesketh-Ford	53	+ 1 Lap	20	
9	38	(France) Henri Pescarolo	Surtees-Ford	52	+ 2 Laps	22	
10	18	(United States) Brett Lunger	Surtees-Ford	51	Accident	16	
11	39	(Italy) Alessandro Pesenti-Rossi	Tyrrell-Ford	51	+ 3 Laps	23	
12	33	(Italy) Lella Lombardi	Brabham-Ford	50	+ 4 Laps	24	
Ret	22	(Austria) Hans Binder	Ensign-Ford	47	Throttle	19	
NC	32	(Switzerland) Loris Kessel	Brabham-Ford	44	+ 10 Laps	25	
Ret	9	(Italy) Vittorio Brambilla	March-Ford	43	Accident	7	
Ret	30	(Brazil) Emerson Fittipaldi	Fittipaldi-Ford	43	Accident	17	
Ret	8	(Brazil) Carlos Pace	Brabham-Alfa Romeo	40	Accident	18	
Ret	17	(France) Jean-Pierre Jarier	Shadow-Ford	40	Fuel Pump	8	
Ret	19	(Australia) Alan Jones	Surtees-Ford	30	Accident	15	
Ret	34	(Germany) Hans-Joachim Stuck	March-Ford	26	Fuel System	11	
Ret	4	(France) Patrick Depailler	Tyrrell-Ford	24	Suspension	13	
Ret	20	(Italy) Arturo Merzario	Wolf-Williams-Ford	17	Accident	21	
Ret	16	(United Kingdom) Tom Pryce	Shadow-Ford	14	Brakes	6	
Ret	3	(South Africa) Jody Scheckter	Tyrrell-Ford	14	Suspension	10	
Ret	7	(Argentina) Carlos Reutemann	Brabham-Alfa Romeo	0	Clutch	14	
WD	40	(Austria) Karl Oppitzhauser	March-Ford				
WD	41	(Austria) Otto Stuppacher	Tyrrell-Ford				

== Notes ==
- This was the 100th race in which a Brazilian driver participated. In those 100 races, Brazilian drivers won 15 Grands Prix, achieved 38 podium finishes, 7 pole positions, 11 fastest laps and won 2 World Championships.
- This race marked the 10th pole position and 10th fastest lap for McLaren.
- This was the 1st Grand Prix win for Penske and the first win for an American constructor since the 1967 Belgian Grand Prix.

== Championship standings after the race ==
Drivers' Championship standings

	Pos	Driver	Points
	1	(Austria) **Niki Lauda***	58
	2	(United Kingdom) **James Hunt***	47
	3	(South Africa) **Jody Scheckter***	34
	4	(France) **Patrick Depailler***	26
2	5	(United Kingdom) **John Watson***	18

Constructors' Championship standings

	Pos	Constructor	Points
	1	(Italy) **Ferrari***	61
	2	(United Kingdom) **McLaren-Ford***	52 (53)
	3	(United Kingdom) **Tyrrell-Ford***	47
1	4	(United States) **Penske-Ford***	18
1	5	(France) Ligier-Matra	16

- Note: Only the top five positions are included for both sets of standings. Only the best 7 results from the first 8 races and the best 7 results from the last 8 races counted towards the Championship. Numbers without parentheses are Championship points; numbers in parentheses are total points scored. Points accurate at final declaration of results: Hunt was subsequently disqualified from the British Grand Prix.
- Competitors in bold and marked with an asterisk still had a theoretical chance of becoming World Champion.

Previous race: 1976 German Grand Prix	FIA Formula One World Championship; 1976 season	Next race: 1976 Dutch Grand Prix
Previous race: 1975 Austrian Grand Prix	Austrian Grand Prix	Next race: 1977 Austrian Grand Prix
