= Arturo Merzario =

Italian racing driver (born 1943)

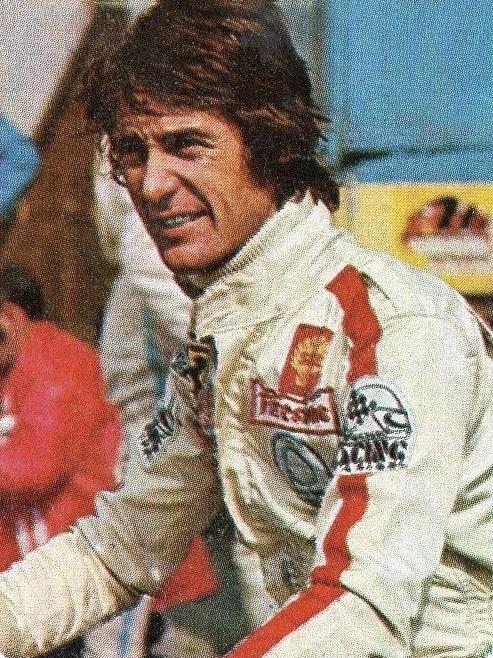
- Merzario in 1973
- Born: Arturo Francesco Merzario (Note: Merzario's name was erroneously registered as Arturio Francesco Merzario on his birth certificate.); 11 March 1943 (age 83); Civenna, Como, Kingdom of Italy

Formula One World Championship career
- Nationality: (Italy) Italian
- Active years: 1972–1979
- Team(s): Ferrari, Frank Williams, Fittipaldi, March, Wolf–Williams, Merzario, Shadow
- Entries: 85 (57 starts)
- Championships: 0
- Wins: 0
- Podiums: 0
- Career points: 11
- Pole positions: 0
- Fastest laps: 0
- First entry: 1972 British Grand Prix
- Last entry: 1979 United States Grand Prix

Arturo Francesco "Art" Merzario (born 11 March 1943) is an Italian racing driver and motorsport executive, who competed in Formula One from 1972 to 1979.

Merzario competed in Formula One for Ferrari, Frank Williams, Fittipaldi, March, Wolf–Williams and Shadow, before founding his eponymous team in 1977: Merzario. He participated in 85 Grands Prix, scoring 11 championship points.

== Racing career ==
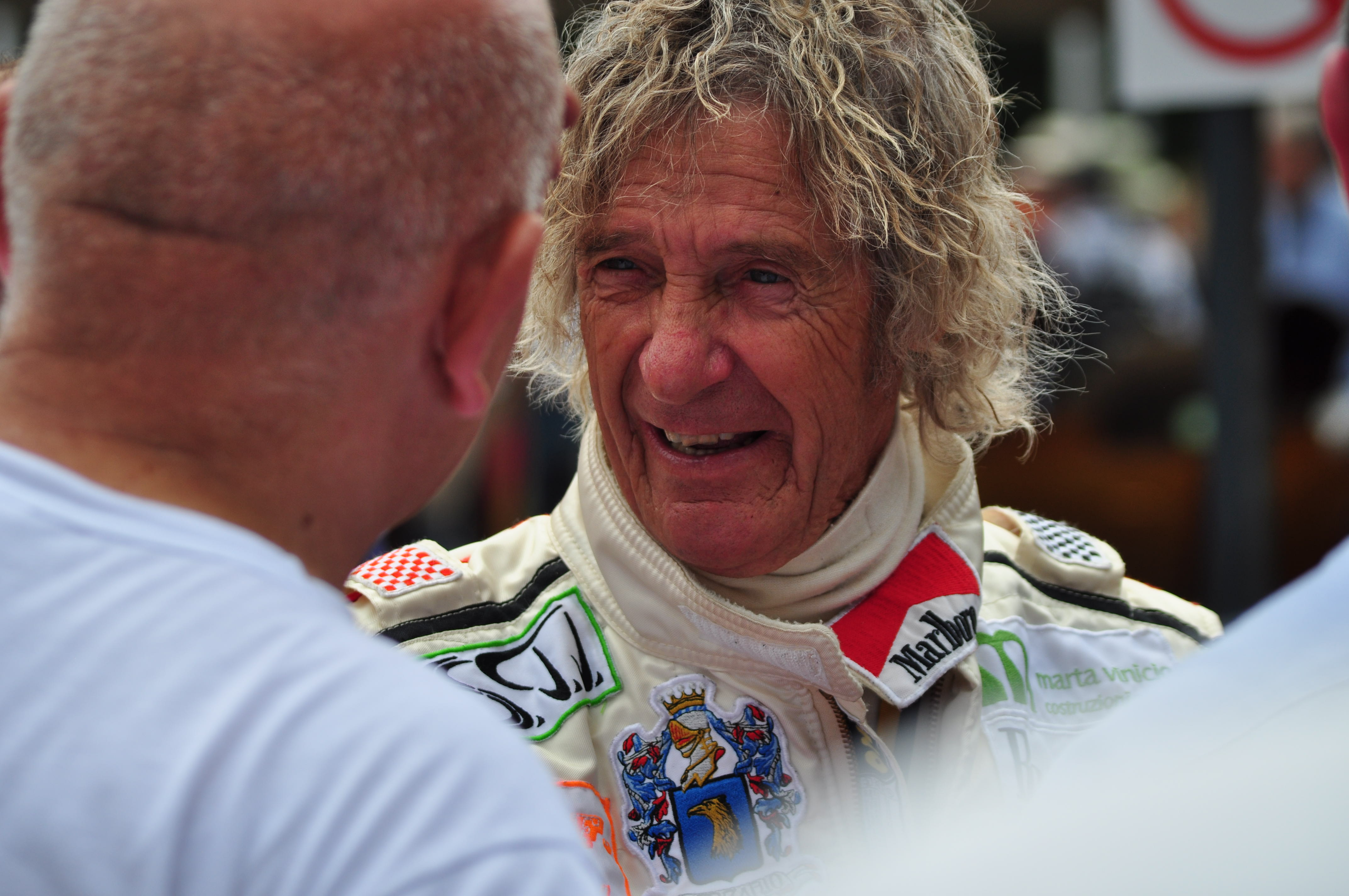
Merzario in 2009

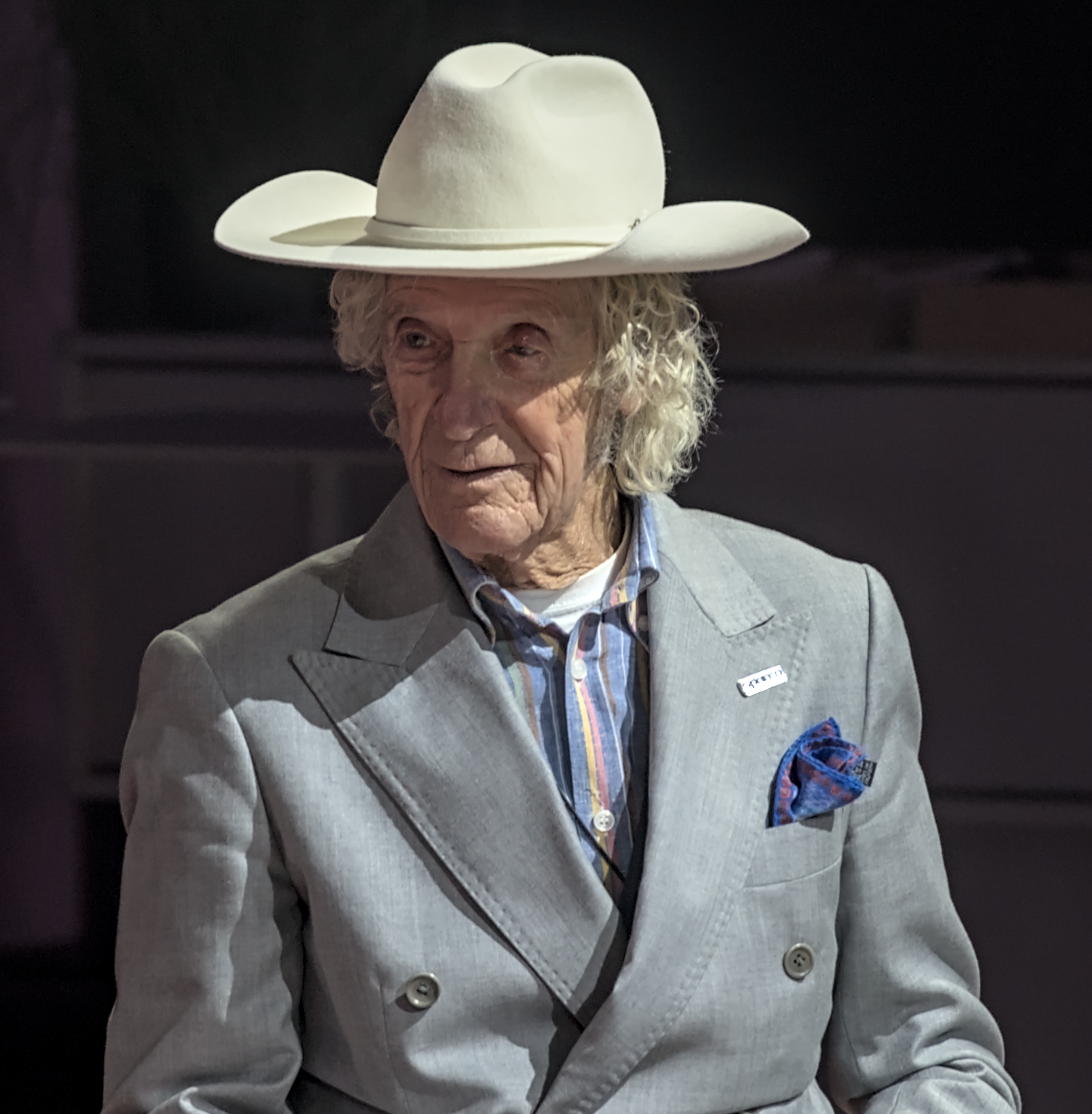
Merzario in 2024

Merzario began his career as a test driver with works Fiat Abarths, subsequently participating to GT racing and European mountain-climb events. In 1969, he won the Mugello Grand Prix in a 2-litre Abarth ahead of a field which included Nino Vaccarella and Andrea de Adamich. This brought him a drive with the Ferrari sportscar team for 1970. In 1972, he won the Spa 1000 km, the Targa Florio and the Rand 9 Hour races and was also European two-litre Champion for Abarth.

=== Formula One ===
Merzario made his Formula One debut in 1972, and became one of the few drivers to score points at their first race by finishing in sixth place in the British Grand Prix at Brands Hatch. He was the last driver whose debut team was Ferrari until Oliver Bearman in the 2024 Saudi Arabian Grand Prix. In 1973 Ferrari confirmed him for the whole season alongside Jacky Ickx. Merzario had a promising start with the old 312B2, finishing fourth in Brazil and South Africa. However, Ferrari's evolved car, the 312B3, proved to be a disappointment, and both he and Ickx struggled for the rest of the season. Deeply disappointed with the way the season had unfolded, Enzo Ferrari decided to change the whole team for the 1974 season, and Merzario moved to Williams. After finishing third in a non-Championship race in Brazil, Merzario scored points at Monza and in South Africa. However, the Williams cars were largely uncompetitive, and in 1975, after a one-off with the Copersucar at Monza, where he finished eleventh, Merzario returned to sports cars with Alfa Romeo — winning four races plus the Targa Florio again.

Merzario returned to Formula One full-time in 1976, initially with the works March. After a run of disappointing results — and disgruntled with his situation — he moved to Wolf, who had just merged his team with Frank Williams Racing Cars, replacing Jacky Ickx; but, again, there were no decent results.

During the 1976 German Grand Prix, Niki Lauda crashed heavily; Merzario was one of the drivers, along with Guy Edwards, Brett Lunger and Harald Ertl who stopped to help, effectively pulling Lauda out of the burning car. 37 years later, in an interview with BBC Radio 5 linked to the release of Rush, Lauda stated that "Merzario jumped into the fire and, alone, pulled me out of the wreckage so I survived… he really saved my life there, because a couple of seconds more I would have never made it." Six weeks later after the incident, at the Italian Grand Prix, Lauda returned to race again and presented his gold Rolex wristwatch to Merzario in gratitude for saving his life.

In 1977, Merzario was able to raise enough sponsors to set up his own Merzario team. The organization struggled in modern Formula One for three years, initially with March 761B cars. From 1978, Merzario began building cars of his own design and the team eventually moved down to Formula Two. In three seasons, the team was only classified on one occasion — at the 1977 Belgian Grand Prix at Zolder — when Merzario was officially placed fourteenth. During the season, he accepted a one-off drive with Shadow in the 1977 Austrian Grand Prix at the Österreichring, but a good drive led to retirement again. Merzario continued with his own chassis for two seasons, but results were very poor; the team's cars did not qualify on the majority of occasions, and often retired from the races they did start. The Merzario M1-BMW fared no better in Formula Two in 1980 but Merzario continued to race sports cars with some success after his works Formula One career finished.

During his time in Formula One, Merzario was often photographed wearing a cowboy hat with sponsorship patches from Marlboro. This became his signature look, and Merzario still wears the hat.

=== Sports cars and other competitions ===
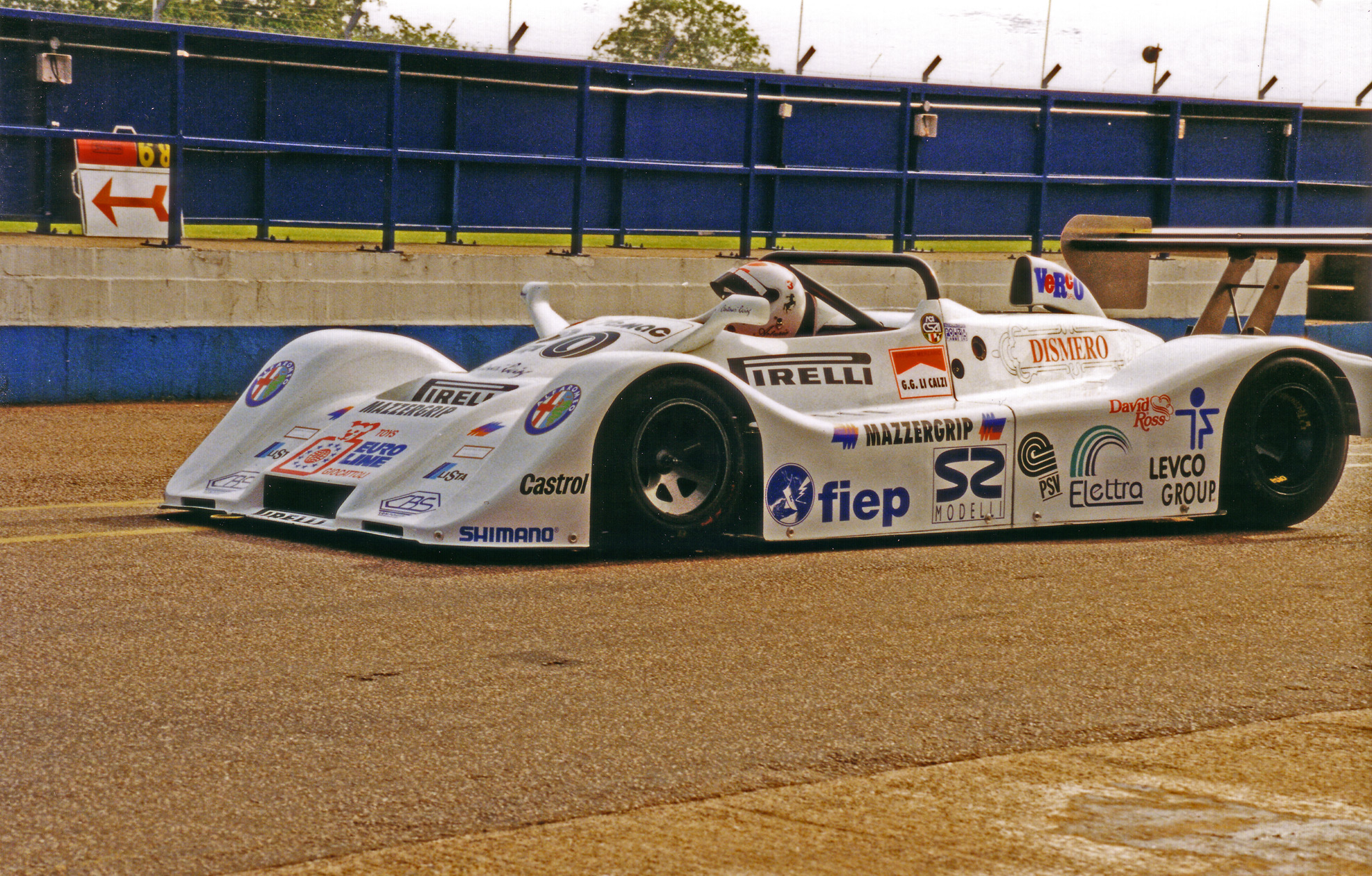
Merzario with a class SR2 Centenari M1-Alfa Romeo in 1997 FIA Sportscar Championship in Donington

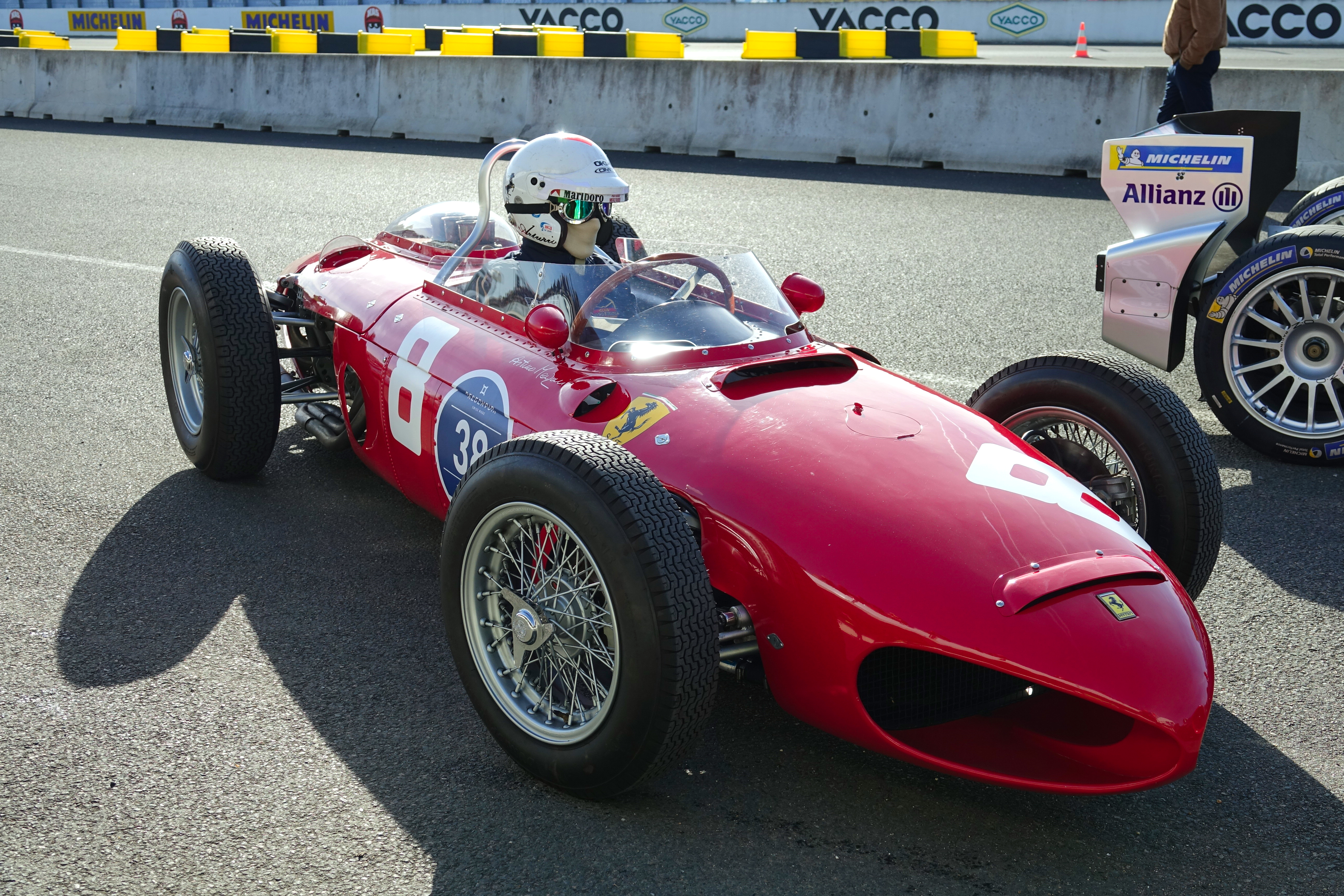
Merzario in a Ferrari 156 F1 in 2018

Merzario began his career with Abarth in GT racing and mountain climbs; he also won the Sardinia Rally in 1963 in an Alfa Romeo Giulietta. He had several class wins throughout the 1960s; his victory in the Mugello Grand Prix of 1969 led to a Ferrari sports car drive. In 1970, he was third in the 24 hours of Daytona and fourth in the 1000 Kilometres of Monza using a Ferrari 512 S. Further wins followed in 1971 at Imola and Vallelunga for Ferrari and Abarth, respectively.

In 1972, Merzario won the 1000 Kilometres of Spa with Brian Redman in a Ferrari 312 PB, won the Targa Florio alongside Sandro Munari, and made his Formula One World Championship debut. In 1973, Merzario took second places in the 1000 Kilometres of Nürburgring and at Le Mans. Merzario also won the Targa Florio in 1975 with an Alfa Romeo T33, and his career continued in sports cars and GT racing into the 1990s; he won the 1985 Italian Prototype Championship, and later campaigned successfully with a Centenari M1.

Merzario was still active in sports car racing well into his sixties, driving mostly in an Italian prototype series.

== Racing record ==
=== Complete 24 Hours of Le Mans results ===
Year	Team	Co-Drivers	Car	Class	Laps	Pos.	Class Pos.
1970	(Italy) SpA Ferrari SEFAC	(Switzerland) Clay Regazzoni	Ferrari 512 S	S 5.0	38	DNF	DNF
1973	(Italy) SpA Ferrari SEFAC	(Brazil) Carlos Pace	Ferrari 312 PB	S 3.0	349	2nd	2nd

=== Complete European Formula Two Championship results ===
(key)

Year	Entrant	Chassis	Engine	1	2	3	4	5	6	7	8	9	10	11	12	13	14	Pos.	Pts
1971	Racing Team IRIS	Tecno TF70	Cosworth FVA	HOC; Ret	THR	NÜR	JAR; DNQ	PAL	ROU; DNQ	MAN	TUL	ALB	VLL	VLL				NC	0
1974	Osella Squadra Corse	Osella PA2	BMW	BAR	HOC	PAU	SAL	HOC	MUG	KAR	PER	HOC	VLL; Ret					NC	0
1975	Osella Squadra Corse	Osella FA2	BMW	EST	THR	HOC	NÜR	PAU	HOC	SAL	ROU	MUG	PER	SIL; Ret	ZOL	NOG	VLL; Ret	NC	0
1976	Willi Kauhsen Racing Team	March 762	Hart	HOC	THR	VLL	SAL	PAU	HOC	ROU	MUG	PER; DNS	EST	NOG				NC	0
1976	Osella Squadra Corse	Osella FA2	BMW												HOC; DNQ			NC	0
1977	Fred Opert Racing	Chevron B40	Hart	SIL	THR	HOC	NÜR	VLL	PAU	MUG	ROU	NOG	PER	MIS; Ret	EST	DON		NC	0
1978	ICI Chevron Cars	Chevron B42	Hart	THR	HOC	NÜR	PAU	MUG; 6	VLL	ROU	DON	NOG	PER	MIS; 5	HOC			18th	3
1980	Merzario Team Srl	Merzario M1	BMW	THR; Ret	HOC; Ret	NÜR; Ret	VLL	PAU; 9	SIL; Ret	ZOL	MUG; 16	ZAN; 17	PER; DNS	MIS	HOC; Ret			27th	0
1981	Astra Team Merzario Srl	Merzario M1	BMW	SIL; DNQ	HOC	THR; DNS									MAN; Ret			NC	0
1981	Astra Team Merzario Srl	March 812	BMW				NÜR; Ret	VLL	MUG	PAU	PER	SPA	DON	MIS				NC	0

=== Complete Formula One World Championship results ===
(key)

Year	Entrant	Chassis	Engine	1	2	3	4	5	6	7	8	9	10	11	12	13	14	15	16	17	WDC	Pts
1972	Scuderia Ferrari SpA SEFAC	Ferrari 312B2	Ferrari 001/1 3.0 F12	ARG	RSA	ESP	MON	BEL	FRA	GBR; 6	GER; 12	AUT	ITA	CAN	USA						20th	1
1973	Scuderia Ferrari SpA SEFAC	Ferrari 312B2	Ferrari 001/1 3.0 F12	ARG; 9	BRA; 4	RSA; 4	ESP	BEL													12th	6
1973	Scuderia Ferrari SpA SEFAC	Ferrari 312B3	Ferrari 001/11 3.0 F12						MON; Ret	SWE	FRA; 7	GBR	NED	GER	AUT; 7	ITA; Ret	CAN; 15	USA; 16			12th	6
1974	Frank Williams Racing Cars	Iso–Marlboro FW	Ford Cosworth DFV 3.0 V8	ARG; Ret	BRA; Ret	RSA; 6	ESP; Ret	BEL; Ret	MON; Ret	SWE; DNS	NED; Ret	FRA; 9	GBR; Ret	GER; Ret	AUT; Ret	ITA; 4	CAN; Ret	USA; Ret			17th	4
1975	Frank Williams Racing Cars	Williams FW03	Ford Cosworth DFV 3.0 V8	ARG; NC	BRA; Ret	RSA; Ret		MON; DNQ	BEL; Ret	SWE	NED	FRA	GBR	GER	AUT						NC	0
1975	Frank Williams Racing Cars	Williams FW04	Ford Cosworth DFV 3.0 V8				ESP; Ret														NC	0
1975	Copersucar-Fittipaldi	Fittipaldi FD03	Ford Cosworth DFV 3.0 V8													ITA; 11	USA				NC	0
1976	Ovoro Team March	March 761	Ford Cosworth DFV 3.0 V8	BRA	RSA	USW; DNQ	ESP; Ret	BEL; Ret	MON; DNQ	SWE; 14	FRA; 9	GBR; Ret									NC	0
1976	Walter Wolf Racing	Wolf–Williams FW05	Ford Cosworth DFV 3.0 V8										GER; Ret	AUT; Ret	NED; Ret	ITA; DNS	CAN; Ret	USA; Ret	JPN; Ret		NC	0
1977	Team Merzario	March 761B	Ford Cosworth DFV 3.0 V8	ARG	BRA	RSA	USW	ESP; Ret	MON; DNQ	BEL; 14	SWE	FRA; Ret	GBR; Ret	GER; DNQ		NED; DNQ	ITA	USA	CAN	JPN	NC	0
1977	Shadow Racing Team	Shadow DN8	Ford Cosworth DFV 3.0 V8												AUT; Ret						NC	0
1978	Team Merzario	Merzario A1	Ford Cosworth DFV 3.0 V8	ARG; Ret	BRA; DNQ	RSA; Ret	USW; Ret	MON; DNPQ	BEL; DNPQ	ESP; DNQ	SWE; NC	FRA; DNQ	GBR; Ret	GER; DNQ	AUT; DNQ	NED; Ret	ITA; Ret	USA; Ret	CAN; DNQ		NC	0
1979	Team Merzario	Merzario A1B	Ford Cosworth DFV 3.0 V8	ARG; Ret	BRA; DNQ	RSA; DNQ	USW; Ret														NC	0
1979	Team Merzario	Merzario A2	Ford Cosworth DFV 3.0 V8					ESP; DNQ	BEL; DNQ	MON	FRA; DNQ			AUT; DNQ							NC	0
1979	Team Merzario	Merzario A4	Ford Cosworth DFV 3.0 V8									GBR; DNQ	GER; DNQ		NED; DNQ	ITA; DNQ	CAN; DNQ	USA; DNQ			NC	0

=== Formula One Non-Championship results ===
(key)

Year	Entrant	Chassis	Engine	1	2	3
1974	Frank Williams Racing Cars	Iso–Marlboro FW	Ford Cosworth DFV 3.0 V8	PRE; 3	ROC	INT
1975	Frank Williams Racing Cars	Iso–Marlboro FW03	Ford Cosworth DFV 3.0 V8	ROC; 7	INT; DNS	SUI
1979	Team Merzario	Merzario A4	Ford Cosworth DFV 3.0 V8	ROC	GNM	DIN; 11
