= 1977 British Grand Prix =

- Race 10 of 17 in the 1977 Formula One season
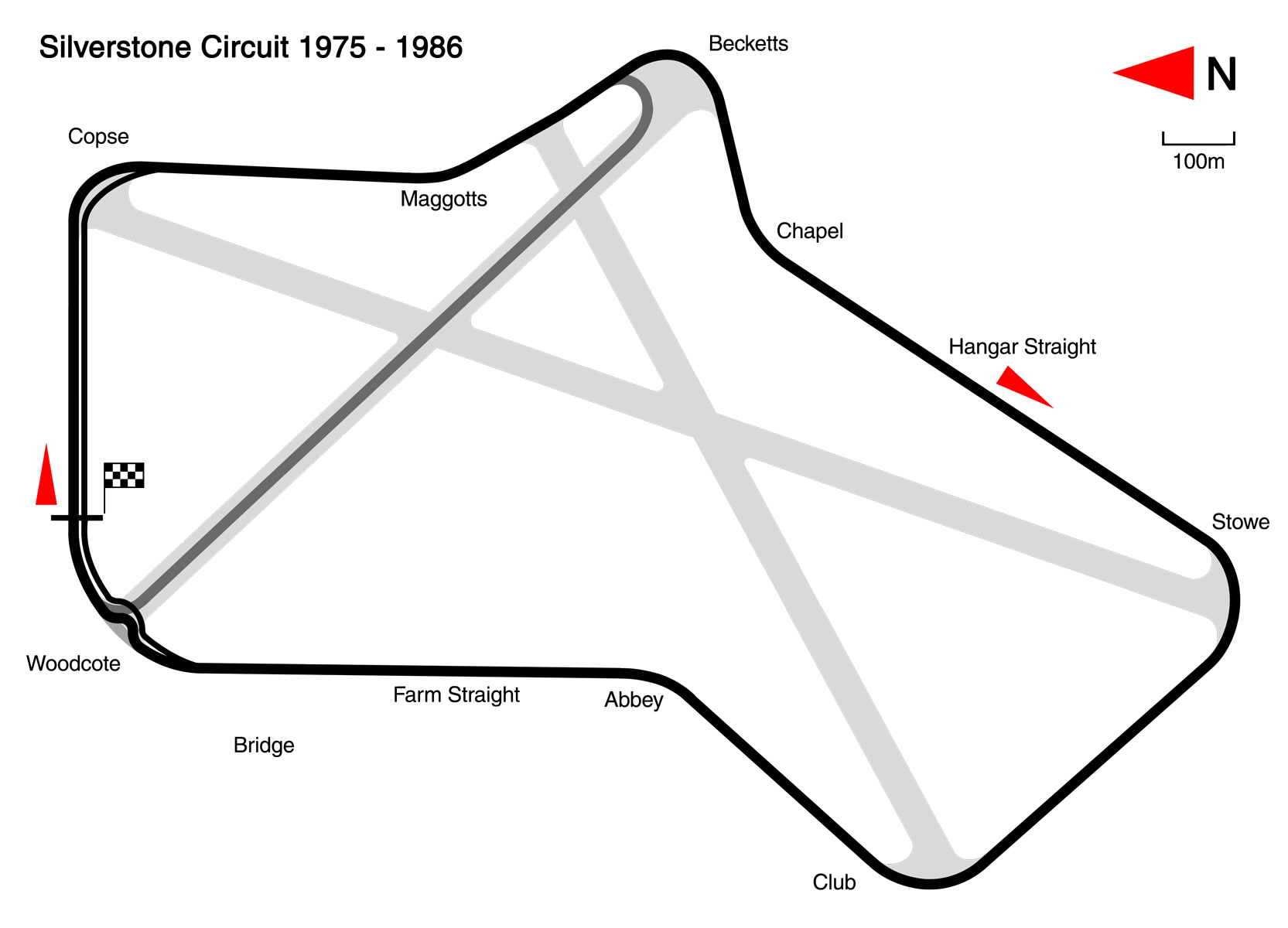

Race details
- Date: 16 July 1977
- Official name: XXX John Player British Grand Prix
- Location: Silverstone Circuit; Northamptonshire, Great Britain
- Course: Permanent racing facility
- Course length: 4.719 km (2.932 miles)
- Distance: 68 laps, 320.871 km (199.380 miles)
- Weather: Sunny

Pole position
Driver	(United Kingdom) James Hunt	McLaren-Ford
- Time: 1:18.49

Fastest lap
Driver	(United Kingdom) James Hunt	McLaren-Ford
- Time: 1:19.60 on lap 48

Podium
First	(United Kingdom) James Hunt	McLaren-Ford
Second	(Austria) Niki Lauda	Ferrari
Third	(Sweden) Gunnar Nilsson	Lotus-Ford

The 1977 British Grand Prix was a Formula One motor race held at Silverstone on 16 July 1977. It was the tenth race of the 1977 World Championship of F1 Drivers and the 1977 International Cup for F1 Constructors.

The 68-lap race was won from pole position by local driver James Hunt, driving a McLaren-Ford, with Austrian driver Niki Lauda second in a Ferrari and Swedish driver Gunnar Nilsson third in a Lotus-Ford. The race marked the debut of Canadian driver Gilles Villeneuve, as well as the first outing for the first turbocharged Formula One car, the Renault RS01, driven by Frenchman Jean-Pierre Jabouille, who retired when the turbocharger had failed after 16 laps. It was also the last race to be given the honorific designation of the European Grand Prix.

== Pre-qualifying ==
Owing to the large number of entrants, a special system of pre-qualification was devised, taking place on the Wednesday before the race. Fourteen cars took part, most from teams which were not members of FOCA. Debutant Gilles Villeneuve also took part, along with Patrick Tambay, Jean-Pierre Jarier, Brett Lunger, Patrick Nève, Mikko Kozarowitzky, another debutant Andy Sutcliffe, Guy Edwards, Tony Trimmer, David Purley, Emilio de Villota, Brian Henton, Arturo Merzario and yet another debutant, Brian McGuire.

Kozarowitzky crashed his RAM March in the first session, and Purley suffered a huge accident in the second session, when the throttle stuck open on his LEC. He suffered multiple fractures and spent many months recovering. He later returned to racing but never appeared in a World Championship Formula One race again. The fastest five drivers after both sessions were Villeneuve, Tambay, Jarier, Lunger and Henton, all of whom went through to the full qualifying sessions. Merzario and Nève were subsequently also allowed through, as was de Villota, who replaced Harald Ertl when the Austrian driver withdrew his entry.

== Qualifying ==
Henton and de Villota were eliminated after the qualifying sessions, along with Alex Ribeiro and Clay Regazzoni. James Hunt took pole position by less than 3 tenths from Northern Irish racing driver John Watson in the Brabham, whilst the rest of the top 10 qualifiers were Niki Lauda, Jody Scheckter, Gunnar Nilsson, Mario Andretti, Hans Joachim Stuck, Vittorio Brambilla, Gilles Villeneuve and Ronnie Peterson in the leading Tyrrell. It was also proven to be a relief for Hunt to secure pole position in front of the home crowd, this was because British racing drivers had not been lucky all season up to this point.

== Classification ==
=== Pre-qualifying ===
Pos	No	Driver	Constructor	Time	Gap
1	40	(Canada) Gilles Villeneuve	McLaren-Ford	1:19.48	—
2	23	(France) Patrick Tambay	Ensign-Ford	1:19.55	+0.07
3	34	(France) Jean-Pierre Jarier	Penske-Ford	1:19.63	+0.15
4	30	(United States) Brett Lunger	McLaren-Ford	1:19.72	+0.24
5	38	(United Kingdom) Brian Henton	March-Ford	1:19.82	+0.34
6	37	(Italy) Arturo Merzario	March-Ford	1:19.86	+0.38
7	27	(Belgium) Patrick Nève	March-Ford	1:19.97	+0.49
8	36	(Spain) Emilio de Villota	McLaren-Ford	1:20.38	+0.90
9	31	(United Kingdom) David Purley	LEC-Ford	1:20.63	+1.15
10	33	(United Kingdom) Andy Sutcliffe	March-Ford	1:21.93	+2.45
11	35	(United Kingdom) Guy Edwards	BRM	1:22.62	+3.14
12	44	(United Kingdom) Tony Trimmer	Surtees-Ford	1:22.80	+3.32
13	45	(Australia) Brian McGuire	McGuire-Ford	1:23.76	+4.28
14	32	(Finland) Mikko Kozarowitzky	March-Ford	1:25.16	+5.68

=== Qualifying ===
Pos	No	Driver	Constructor	Time	Gap
1	1	(United Kingdom) James Hunt	McLaren-Ford	1:18.49	—
2	7	(United Kingdom) John Watson	Brabham-Alfa Romeo	1:18.77	+0.28
3	11	(Austria) Niki Lauda	Ferrari	1:18.84	+0.35
4	20	(South Africa) Jody Scheckter	Wolf-Ford	1:18.85	+0.36
5	6	(Sweden) Gunnar Nilsson	Lotus-Ford	1:18.95	+0.46
6	5	(United States) Mario Andretti	Lotus-Ford	1:19.11	+0.62
7	8	(West Germany) Hans-Joachim Stuck	Brabham-Alfa Romeo	1:19.16	+0.67
8	19	(Italy) Vittorio Brambilla	Surtees-Ford	1:19.20	+0.71
9	40	(Canada) Gilles Villeneuve	McLaren-Ford	1:19.32	+0.83
10	3	(Sweden) Ronnie Peterson	Tyrrell-Ford	1:19.42	+0.93
11	2	(West Germany) Jochen Mass	McLaren-Ford	1:19.55	+1.06
12	17	(Australia) Alan Jones	Shadow-Ford	1:19.60	+1.11
13	24	(United Kingdom) Rupert Keegan	Hesketh-Ford	1:19.64	+1.15
14	12	(Argentina) Carlos Reutemann	Ferrari	1:19.64	+1.15
15	26	(France) Jacques Laffite	Ligier-Matra	1:19.75	+1.26
16	23	(France) Patrick Tambay	Ensign-Ford	1:19.81	+1.32
17	37	(Italy) Arturo Merzario	March-Ford	1:19.88	+1.39
18	4	(France) Patrick Depailler	Tyrrell-Ford	1:19.90	+1.41
19	30	(United States) Brett Lunger	McLaren-Ford	1:20.06	+1.57
20	34	(France) Jean-Pierre Jarier	Penske-Ford	1:20.10	+1.61
21	15	(France) Jean-Pierre Jabouille	Renault	1:20.11	+1.62
22	28	(Brazil) Emerson Fittipaldi	Fittipaldi-Ford	1:20.20	+1.71
23	18	(Australia) Vern Schuppan	Surtees-Ford	1:20.24	+1.75
24	10	(South Africa) Ian Scheckter	March-Ford	1:20.31	+1.82
25	16	(Italy) Riccardo Patrese	Shadow-Ford	1:20.35	+1.86
26	27	(Belgium) Patrick Nève	March-Ford	1:20.36	+1.87
27	9	(Brazil) Alex Ribeiro	March-Ford	1:20.46	+1.97
28	22	(Switzerland) Clay Regazzoni	Ensign-Ford	1:20.79	+2.30
29	38	(United Kingdom) Brian Henton	March-Ford	1:20.79	+2.30
30	36	(Spain) Emilio de Villota	McLaren-Ford	1:21.53	+3.04

=== Race ===
James Hunt had started from pole position with John Watson alongside him. But, Hunt did not get a good start due to clutch problems and dropped back to 4th as a result. This allowed Watson to take the lead into the first corner ahead of Niki Lauda's Ferrari and Jody Scheckter's Wolf. However, as the race had slowly progressed Hunt eventually managed to re-overtake Lauda and Scheckter and re-passed Watson for the race lead as the British drivers were running first and second. But the order of the top 2 did not stay the same as Watson started to slow when his fuel system failed on lap 53 and retired only 8 laps later. With Watson dropping out of contention this promoted Niki Lauda to second and Jody Scheckter to third. But Scheckter was also forced to retire later on when his engine failed on lap 60 which gave Mario Andretti in the leading Lotus third before his engine had also failed 3 laps later but was classified 14th. As Gunnar Nilsson in the remaining Lotus was given 3rd place and stayed there. James Hunt had finally managed to take his first win of the season for McLaren to the delight of the British fans, ahead of championship leader Niki Lauda, Gunnar Nilsson, Jochen Mass in the second McLaren, Hans Joachim Stuck in the remaining Brabham and Jacques Laffite in the only Ligier.

Pos	No	Driver	Constructor	Tyre	Laps	Time/Retired	Grid	Points
1	1	(United Kingdom) James Hunt	McLaren-Ford	G	68	1:31:46.06	1	9
2	11	(Austria) Niki Lauda	Ferrari	G	68	+ 18.31	3	6
3	6	(Sweden) Gunnar Nilsson	Lotus-Ford	G	68	+ 19.57	5	4
4	2	(West Germany) Jochen Mass	McLaren-Ford	G	68	+ 47.76	11	3
5	8	(West Germany) Hans-Joachim Stuck	Brabham-Alfa Romeo	G	68	+ 1:11.73	7	2
6	26	(France) Jacques Laffite	Ligier-Matra	G	67	+ 1 Lap	15	1
7	17	(Australia) Alan Jones	Shadow-Ford	G	67	+ 1 Lap	12	
8	19	(Italy) Vittorio Brambilla	Surtees-Ford	G	67	+ 1 Lap	8	
9	34	(France) Jean-Pierre Jarier	Penske-Ford	G	67	+ 1 Lap	20	
10	27	(Belgium) Patrick Nève	March-Ford	G	66	+ 2 Laps	26	
11	40	(Canada) Gilles Villeneuve	McLaren-Ford	G	66	+ 2 Laps	9	
12	18	(Australia) Vern Schuppan	Surtees-Ford	G	66	+ 2 Laps	23	
13	30	(United States) Brett Lunger	McLaren-Ford	G	64	+ 4 Laps	19	
14	5	(United States) Mario Andretti	Lotus-Ford	G	62	Engine	6	
15	12	(Argentina) Carlos Reutemann	Ferrari	G	62	+ 6 Laps	14	
Ret	7	(United Kingdom) John Watson	Brabham-Alfa Romeo	G	60	Fuel System	2	
Ret	20	(South Africa) Jody Scheckter	Wolf-Ford	G	59	Engine	4	
Ret	28	(Brazil) Emerson Fittipaldi	Fittipaldi-Ford	G	42	Throttle	22	
Ret	37	(Italy) Arturo Merzario	March-Ford	G	28	Transmission	17	
Ret	16	(Italy) Riccardo Patrese	Shadow-Ford	G	20	Fuel Pressure	25	
Ret	4	(France) Patrick Depailler	Tyrrell-Ford	G	16	Brakes	18	
Ret	15	(France) Jean-Pierre Jabouille	Renault	MI	16	Turbo	21	
Ret	10	(South Africa) Ian Scheckter	March-Ford	G	6	Accident	24	
Ret	3	(Sweden) Ronnie Peterson	Tyrrell-Ford	G	3	Engine	10	
Ret	23	(France) Patrick Tambay	Ensign-Ford	G	3	Electrical	16	
Ret	24	(United Kingdom) Rupert Keegan	Hesketh-Ford	G	0	Accident	13	
DNQ	9	(Brazil) Alex Ribeiro	March-Ford	G				
DNQ	22	(Switzerland) Clay Regazzoni	Ensign-Ford	G				
DNQ	38	(United Kingdom) Brian Henton	March-Ford	G				
DNQ	36	(Spain) Emilio de Villota	McLaren-Ford	G				
DNPQ	31	(United Kingdom) David Purley	LEC-Ford	G		Accident		
DNPQ	33	(United Kingdom) Andy Sutcliffe	March-Ford	G				
DNPQ	35	(United Kingdom) Guy Edwards	BRM	G				
DNPQ	44	(United Kingdom) Tony Trimmer	Surtees-Ford	G				
DNPQ	45	(Australia) Brian McGuire	McGuire-Ford	G				
DNPQ	32	(Finland) Mikko Kozarowitzky	March-Ford	G		Accident		
WD	25	(Austria) Harald Ertl	Hesketh-Ford	G				
WD	39	(Mexico) Héctor Rebaque	Hesketh-Ford	G				
WD	43	(United Kingdom) Derek Bell	Penske-Ford	G				
WD	46	(Belgium) Bernard de Dryver	March-Ford	G				

== Notes ==
- This was the Formula One World Championship debut for Australian driver Brian McGuire, British driver Andy Sutcliffe and Canadian driver and future Grand Prix winner Gilles Villeneuve.
- This was the 25th podium finish for a Swedish driver.
- This was the Formula One World Championship debut for Renault as a constructor and as engine supplier and for Australian constructor McGuire - the first Australian constructor in Formula One.
- This race marked the 10th Grand Prix start for Wolf.
- This was the 10th British Grand Prix win for a Ford-powered car.

== Championship standings after the race ==
Drivers' Championship standings

	Pos	Driver	Points
	1	(Austria) Niki Lauda	39
	2	(United States) Mario Andretti	32
	3	(South Africa) Jody Scheckter	32
	4	(Argentina) Carlos Reutemann	28
2	5	(United Kingdom) James Hunt	22

Constructors' Championship standings

	Pos	Constructor	Points
	1	(Italy) Ferrari	56 (58)
	2	(United Kingdom) Lotus-Ford	47
1	3	(United Kingdom) McLaren-Ford	34
1	4	(Canada) Wolf-Ford	32
	5	(United Kingdom) Brabham-Alfa Romeo	19

- Note: Only the top five positions are included for both sets of standings. Only the best 8 results from the first 9 races and the best 7 results from the remaining 8 races were retained. Numbers without parentheses are retained points; numbers in parentheses are total points scored.

Previous race: 1977 French Grand Prix	FIA Formula One World Championship; 1977 season	Next race: 1977 German Grand Prix
Previous race: 1976 British Grand Prix	British Grand Prix	Next race: 1978 British Grand Prix
Previous race: 1976 Dutch Grand Prix	European Grand Prix (Designated European Grand Prix)	Next race: 1983 European Grand Prix
Awards
Preceded by 1976 United States Grand Prix West	Formula One Promotional Trophy for Race Promoter; 1977	Succeeded by 1978 British Grand Prix
