= Frank Williams Racing Cars =

Formula One racing team

- Full name: Frank Williams Racing Cars
- Founder(s): Frank Williams
- Noted drivers: (United Kingdom) Piers Courage; (France) Jacques Laffite; (Brazil) Carlos Pace; (Belgium) Jacky Ickx; (Sweden) Ronnie Peterson
- Next name: Walter Wolf Racing

Formula One World Championship career
- First entry: 1969 Spanish Grand Prix
- Races entered: 105 (96 starts)
- Constructors' Championships: 0
- Drivers' Championships: 0
- Race victories: 0
- Pole positions: 0
- Fastest laps: 1
- Final entry: 1976 Japanese Grand Prix

Frank Williams Racing Cars was a British Formula One team and constructor.

== Early years ==
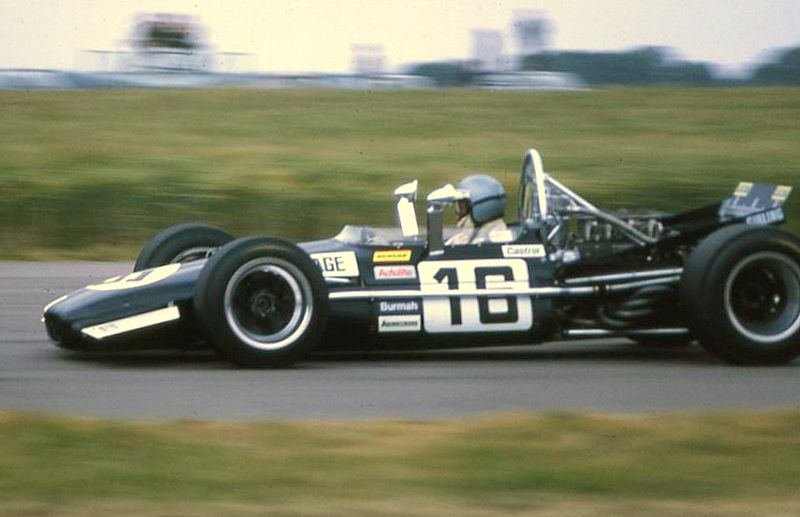
Piers Courage in a Williams entered Brabham BT26A at the 1969 British Grand Prix.

Frank Williams had been a motor-racing enthusiast since a young age, and after a career in saloon cars and Formula Three, backed by Williams's shrewd instincts as a dealer in racing cars and spares, he realised he'd reached his peak as a driver and started entering other drivers, in particular his friend and sometime flatmate Piers Courage. After Williams backed Courage in a successful 1968 Formula Two season, he purchased a Brabham Formula One car for Courage in 1969. This allegedly angered Jack Brabham, as the car had been sold to Williams with the expectation that it would be used in the Tasman Series and then converted to Formula 5000. Courage in fact had a great year, taking second place at both the Monaco and US Grands Prix.

Their efforts attracted the interest of Italian sports car manufacturer De Tomaso, who built a Formula One chassis (designed by Giampaolo Dallara) for the 1970 season. However, the car was initially uncompetitive, failing to finish the first four races of the year. In the fifth, the Dutch Grand Prix, the De Tomaso 505/38 flipped and caught fire, killing Courage. The death of his friend seriously upset Williams; the subsequent distance the team principal placed between himself and his drivers has been attributed to this event. The team soldiered on, however, first with Brian Redman, then with Tim Schenken. With no results, the partnership with De Tomaso was dissolved.

For 1971, Williams purchased a year-old March 701, and ran Frenchman Henri Pescarolo. The team later upgraded to a new March 711, but results were difficult to come by. The old car was also entered for Max Jean at the French Grand Prix. After the success of 1969, Williams was now low on funds, living a hand-to-mouth existence from race to race. Pescarolo did, however, keep the outfit ticking over with fourth place at the British Grand Prix and sixth in Austria.

== Frank Williams Racing Cars (1969–1975) ==
=== Politoys and the FX3 ===
French oil company Motul came on board for the 1972 season, enabling Williams to buy a new March 721 for Pescarolo, while backing from Italian toy manufacturer Politoys provided money to build an in-house chassis. From the (non-Championship) Brazilian Grand Prix, Carlos Pace was entered in the previous year's March 711, later taking fifth at the Belgian Grand Prix.

The Len Bailey-designed Politoys FX3 was a conventional Cosworth-engined car with a Hewland FG400 gearbox. It debuted in the hands of Pescarolo at the British Grand Prix, but the steering failed and the car was heavily damaged. Pescarolo switched back to his March 721 while the Politoys was rebuilt. In its last appearance as the Politoys FX3, Chris Amon drove the car for the team in the end of season non-Championship 1972 World Championship Victory Race at Brands Hatch, but qualified only 20th and retired with engine failure.

=== Iso–Marlboro and the FX3B ===
Motul and Politoys both withdrew their backing at the end of 1972, but Williams managed to attract backing from cigarette giant Marlboro and Italian sports car manufacturer Iso Autoveicoli S.p.A. for the 1973 season. The Politoys FX3 was reworked as the Iso–Marlboro FX3B and a second car was built. Two new drivers were signed, New Zealand's Howden Ganley and Italy's Nanni Galli.

At the first race in Argentina, Galli qualified 16th with Ganley 19th and last on the grid. Galli's engine failed on the first lap, but Ganley finished the race, although he was not classified due to being 17 laps adrift of the winner. The team fared better in Brazil with Ganley finishing seventh and Galli ninth. Galli was then injured testing a sports car and replaced for the following race in South Africa by local driver Jackie Pretorius. Pretorius retired his FX3B at half-distance with overheating problems, but Ganley managed tenth, albeit six laps down.

The FX3B had become obsolete by this time due to new deformable structure regulations and was replaced by the new Iso–Marlboro IR. However, the FX3B was raced in two non-Championship races at this time; at the 1973 Race of Champions, Tony Trimmer raced an FX3B to fourth place while Ganley retired his car with handling problems. The New Zealander also retired at the FX3B's last race, the 1973 BRDC International Trophy, this time with low oil pressure.

=== Iso–Marlboro IR, FW and first Williams ===
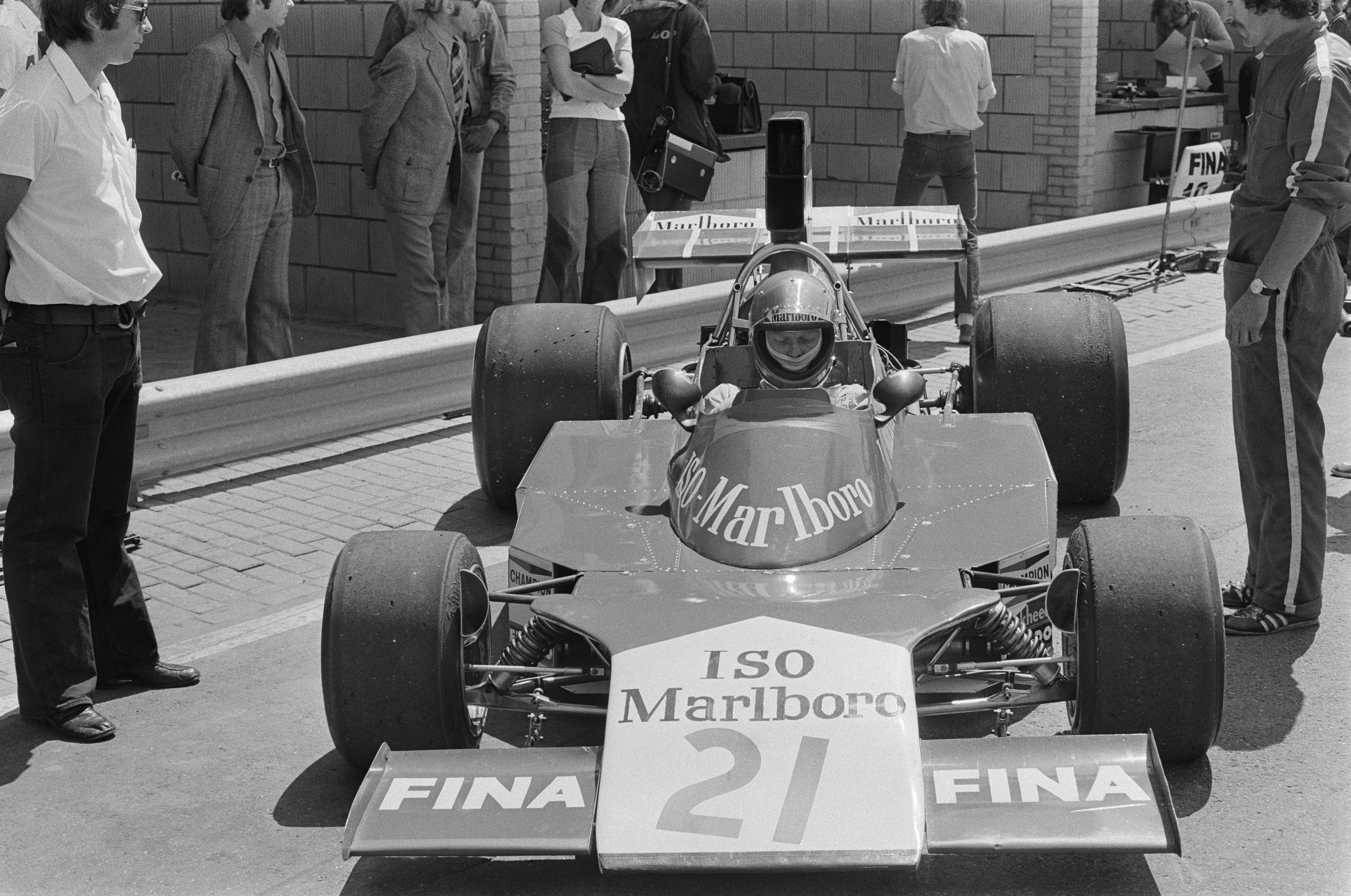
Gijs van Lennep in the Iso–Marlboro FW at the 1974 Dutch Grand Prix

Introduced at the 1973 Spanish Grand Prix, the Iso–Marlboro IR was driven by eight different drivers during the rest of the 1973 season. Ganley was the only regular driver and he scored a point with the car at the Canadian Grand Prix towards the end of the season. Of the other drivers; Galli, Pescarolo, Tom Belsø, Graham McRae, Gijs van Lennep, Tim Schenken and Jacky Ickx, only van Lennep was able to score a point, at his home race in the Netherlands.

Both Iso Rivolta and Marlboro left before the 1974 season, leaving Williams with financial problems. The two IR chassis were retained, now re-designated the FW after Frank Williams, but initially only a single car was entered for Arturo Merzario, who had replaced Ganley as the team's number one driver. There was an early-season boost as Merzario placed sixth in the third race of the season in South Africa, but when the second car was reintroduced, the string of paydrivers employed to drive it produced little in the way of results. After three non-qualifications, Jacques Laffite was brought in to partner Merzario and performances gradually improved, culminating in a fourth-place finish for Merzario in Italy. This gave the team a total of four points, and another tenth-place finish in the Constructors' Championship. Three Iso–Marlboro FW chassis were ultimately used during 1974, including a newly built car, and these were renamed Williams FW01, FW02 and FW03 for 1975; separate designations despite the three cars being essentially the same.

Merzario and Laffite stayed on for the start of the 1975 season as the team continued to use the FW02 and FW03. Williams decided a new car was needed. The new Williams FW04 was the first chassis to carry the Williams name and it replaced the FW02 at the Spanish Grand Prix, and promising British youngster Tony Brise substituted for Laffite, finishing just outside the points in seventh. By this time, however, the team's money problems had become serious, and Merzario left following the Belgian Grand Prix, his place taken for the rest of the season by six different paying drivers – Ian Scheckter, François Migault, Ian Ashley, Jo Vonlanthen, Renzo Zorzi and Lella Lombardi. Northern Ireland's Damien Magee, meanwhile, substituted for Laffite in Sweden.

Around the same time, Frank Williams signed a young engineer, Patrick Head who would partner with his boss when the team reformed as Williams Grand Prix Engineering in 1977. A major shock came in Germany when a mixture of attrition and tenacious driving saw Laffite take the FW04 to second place behind the Brabham of Carlos Reutemann, bringing much-needed financial aid to a team on the point of collapse. This was to be the team's only points finish of the season, but they improved their position in the Constructors' Championship by one place, to ninth.

== Wolf–Williams Racing (1976) ==
Before the start of the 1976 season, Canadian oil millionaire Walter Wolf bought 60% of Frank Williams Racing Cars and the team became Wolf–Williams Racing. However, Frank Williams was retained as team manager. Soon afterwards, Harvey Postlethwaite arrived as chief engineer. Simultaneously Wolf bought the assets of the Hesketh team that had recently withdrawn from F1. The team was based in the Williams facility at Reading but used most of the cars and equipment once owned by Hesketh Racing. The team inherited the Hesketh 308C car used by Hesketh Racing during the final races of 1975, rebranding it as the Wolf–Williams FW05 and the Williams FW04 was similarly rebranded as the Wolf–Williams FW04, although it was only used in the opening race of the season, the 1976 Brazilian Grand Prix.

At season's end, Wolf decided to restructure the team, removing Frank Williams from the manager's job and putting in former Team Lotus manager Peter Warr. Disillusioned, Williams left the team altogether, to set up Williams Grand Prix Engineering with Patrick Head in 1977. Wolf bought 100% of Wolf–Williams Racing and the team became Walter Wolf Racing.

== Complete Formula One World Championship results ==
(key)

Year	Chassis	Engine	Tyres	Drivers	1	2	3	4	5	6	7	8	9	10	11	12	13	14	15	16	WCC	Points
1969	Brabham BT26A	Ford Cosworth DFV 3.0 V8	D		RSA	ESP	MON	NED	FRA	GBR	GER	ITA	CAN	USA	MEX						—N/a	—N/a
1969	Brabham BT26A	Ford Cosworth DFV 3.0 V8	D	(United Kingdom) Piers Courage		Ret	2	Ret	Ret	5	Ret	5	Ret	2	10						—N/a	—N/a
1969	Brabham BT30	Ford Cosworth FVA 1.6 L4	D	(United Kingdom) Richard Attwood							6										—N/a	—N/a
1970	De Tomaso 505	Ford Cosworth DFV 3.0 V8	D		RSA	ESP	MON	BEL	NED	FRA	GBR	GER	AUT	ITA	CAN	USA	MEX				—N/a	—N/a
1970	De Tomaso 505	Ford Cosworth DFV 3.0 V8	D	(United Kingdom) Piers Courage	Ret	DNS	NC	Ret	Ret												—N/a	—N/a
1970	De Tomaso 505	Ford Cosworth DFV 3.0 V8	D	(United Kingdom) Brian Redman							DNS	DNQ									—N/a	—N/a
1970	De Tomaso 505	Ford Cosworth DFV 3.0 V8	D	(Australia) Tim Schenken									Ret	Ret	NC	Ret					—N/a	—N/a
1971	March 701; March 711	Ford Cosworth DFV 3.0 V8	G		RSA	ESP	MON	NED	FRA	GBR	GER	AUT	ITA	CAN	USA						—N/a	—N/a
1971	March 701; March 711	Ford Cosworth DFV 3.0 V8	G	(France) Henri Pescarolo	11	Ret	8	NC	Ret	4	Ret	6	Ret	DNS	Ret						—N/a	—N/a
1971	March 701; March 711	Ford Cosworth DFV 3.0 V8	G	(France) Max Jean					NC												—N/a	—N/a
1972	March 711; March 721	Ford Cosworth DFV 3.0 V8	G		ARG	RSA	ESP	MON	BEL	FRA	GBR	GER	AUT	ITA	CAN	USA					—N/a	—N/a
1972	March 711; March 721	Ford Cosworth DFV 3.0 V8	G	(Brazil) Carlos Pace		17	6	17	5	Ret	Ret	NC	NC	Ret	9	Ret					—N/a	—N/a
1972	March 711; March 721	Ford Cosworth DFV 3.0 V8	G	(France) Henri Pescarolo	8	11	11	Ret	NC	DNS		Ret	DNS	DNQ	13	14					—N/a	—N/a
1972	Politoys FX3	Ford Cosworth DFV 3.0 V8	G	(France) Henri Pescarolo							Ret										NC	0
1973	Iso–Marlboro FX3B; Iso–Marlboro IR	Ford Cosworth DFV 3.0 V8	F		ARG	BRA	RSA	ESP	BEL	MON	SWE	FRA	GBR	NED	GER	AUT	ITA	CAN	USA		10th	2
1973	Iso–Marlboro FX3B; Iso–Marlboro IR	Ford Cosworth DFV 3.0 V8	F	(New Zealand) Howden Ganley	NC	7	10	Ret	Ret	Ret	11	14	9	9	DNS	NC	NC	6	12		10th	2
1973	Iso–Marlboro FX3B; Iso–Marlboro IR	Ford Cosworth DFV 3.0 V8	F	(Italy) Nanni Galli	Ret	9		11	Ret	Ret											10th	2
1973	Iso–Marlboro FX3B; Iso–Marlboro IR	Ford Cosworth DFV 3.0 V8	F	(South Africa) Jackie Pretorius			Ret														10th	2
1973	Iso–Marlboro FX3B; Iso–Marlboro IR	Ford Cosworth DFV 3.0 V8	F	(Denmark) Tom Belsø							DNS										10th	2
1973	Iso–Marlboro FX3B; Iso–Marlboro IR	Ford Cosworth DFV 3.0 V8	F	(France) Henri Pescarolo								Ret			10						10th	2
1973	Iso–Marlboro FX3B; Iso–Marlboro IR	Ford Cosworth DFV 3.0 V8	F	(New Zealand) Graham McRae									Ret								10th	2
1973	Iso–Marlboro FX3B; Iso–Marlboro IR	Ford Cosworth DFV 3.0 V8	F	(Netherlands) Gijs van Lennep										6		9	Ret				10th	2
1973	Iso–Marlboro FX3B; Iso–Marlboro IR	Ford Cosworth DFV 3.0 V8	F	(Australia) Tim Schenken														14			10th	2
1973	Iso–Marlboro FX3B; Iso–Marlboro IR	Ford Cosworth DFV 3.0 V8	F	(Belgium) Jacky Ickx															7		10th	2
1974	Iso–Marlboro FW	Ford Cosworth DFV 3.0 V8	F		ARG	BRA	RSA	ESP	BEL	MON	SWE	NED	FRA	GBR	GER	AUT	ITA	CAN	USA		10th	4
1974	Iso–Marlboro FW	Ford Cosworth DFV 3.0 V8	F	(Italy) Arturo Merzario	Ret	Ret	6	Ret	Ret	Ret	DNS	Ret	9	Ret	Ret	Ret	4	Ret	Ret		10th	4
1974	Iso–Marlboro FW	Ford Cosworth DFV 3.0 V8	F	(United Kingdom) Richard Robarts							DNS										10th	4
1974	Iso–Marlboro FW	Ford Cosworth DFV 3.0 V8	F	(Denmark) Tom Belsø			Ret	DNQ			8			DNQ							10th	4
1974	Iso–Marlboro FW	Ford Cosworth DFV 3.0 V8	F	(Netherlands) Gijs van Lennep					14			DNQ									10th	4
1974	Iso–Marlboro FW	Ford Cosworth DFV 3.0 V8	F	(France) Jean-Pierre Jabouille									DNQ								10th	4
1974	Iso–Marlboro FW	Ford Cosworth DFV 3.0 V8	F	(France) Jacques Laffite											Ret	NC	Ret	15	Ret		10th	4
1975	Williams FW; Williams FW04	Ford Cosworth DFV 3.0 V8	G		ARG	BRA	RSA	ESP	MON	BEL	SWE	NED	FRA	GBR	GER	AUT	ITA	USA			9th	6
1975	Williams FW; Williams FW04	Ford Cosworth DFV 3.0 V8	G	(Italy) Arturo Merzario	NC	Ret	Ret	Ret	DNQ	Ret											9th	6
1975	Williams FW; Williams FW04	Ford Cosworth DFV 3.0 V8	G	(United Kingdom) Damien Magee							14										9th	6
1975	Williams FW; Williams FW04	Ford Cosworth DFV 3.0 V8	G	(France) François Migault									DNS								9th	6
1975	Williams FW; Williams FW04	Ford Cosworth DFV 3.0 V8	G	(United Kingdom) Ian Ashley											DNS						9th	6
1975	Williams FW; Williams FW04	Ford Cosworth DFV 3.0 V8	G	(Switzerland) Jo Vonlanthen												Ret					9th	6
1975	Williams FW; Williams FW04	Ford Cosworth DFV 3.0 V8	G	(Italy) Renzo Zorzi													14				9th	6
1975	Williams FW; Williams FW04	Ford Cosworth DFV 3.0 V8	G	(Italy) Lella Lombardi														DNS			9th	6
1975	Williams FW; Williams FW04	Ford Cosworth DFV 3.0 V8	G	(France) Jacques Laffite	Ret	11	NC		DNQ	Ret		Ret	11	Ret	2	Ret	Ret	DNS			9th	6
1975	Williams FW; Williams FW04	Ford Cosworth DFV 3.0 V8	G	(United Kingdom) Tony Brise				7													9th	6
1975	Williams FW; Williams FW04	Ford Cosworth DFV 3.0 V8	G	(South Africa) Ian Scheckter							Ret	12									9th	6
1976	Wolf–Williams FW04; Wolf–Williams FW05	Ford Cosworth DFV 3.0 V8	G		BRA	RSA	USW	ESP	BEL	MON	SWE	FRA	GBR	GER	AUT	NED	ITA	CAN	USA	JPN	NC	0
1976	Wolf–Williams FW04; Wolf–Williams FW05	Ford Cosworth DFV 3.0 V8	G	(Belgium) Jacky Ickx	8	16	DNQ	7	DNQ	DNQ		10	DNQ								NC	0
1976	Wolf–Williams FW04; Wolf–Williams FW05	Ford Cosworth DFV 3.0 V8	G	(Italy) Arturo Merzario										Ret	Ret	Ret	DNS	Ret	Ret	Ret	NC	0
1976	Wolf–Williams FW04; Wolf–Williams FW05	Ford Cosworth DFV 3.0 V8	G	(Italy) Renzo Zorzi	9																NC	0
1976	Wolf–Williams FW04; Wolf–Williams FW05	Ford Cosworth DFV 3.0 V8	G	(France) Michel Leclère		13	DNQ	10	11	11	Ret	13									NC	0
1976	Wolf–Williams FW04; Wolf–Williams FW05	Ford Cosworth DFV 3.0 V8	G	(New Zealand) Chris Amon														DNS			NC	0
1976	Wolf–Williams FW04; Wolf–Williams FW05	Ford Cosworth DFV 3.0 V8	G	(Australia) Warwick Brown															14		NC	0
1976	Wolf–Williams FW04; Wolf–Williams FW05	Ford Cosworth DFV 3.0 V8	G	(Austria) Hans Binder																Ret	NC	0
1976	Wolf–Williams FW04; Wolf–Williams FW05	Ford Cosworth DFV 3.0 V8	G	(Japan) Masami Kuwashima																DNS	NC	0
1976	Williams FW04	Ford Cosworth DFV 3.0 V8	G	(Spain) Emilio Zapico				DNQ													NC	0

=== Non-championship results ===
(key)

Year	Chassis	Engine	Driver	1	2	3	4	5	6	7	8
1969	Brabham BT26A	Ford Cosworth DFV 3.0 V8		ROC	INT	MAD	OUL				
1969	Brabham BT26A	Ford Cosworth DFV 3.0 V8	(United Kingdom) Piers Courage	Ret	5						
1970	De Tomaso 505	Ford Cosworth DFV 3.0 V8		ROC	INT	OUL					
1970	De Tomaso 505	Ford Cosworth DFV 3.0 V8	(United Kingdom) Piers Courage		3						
1970	De Tomaso 505	Ford Cosworth DFV 3.0 V8	(Australia) Tim Schenken			DNA					
1971	March 701	Ford Cosworth DFV 3.0 V8		ARG	ROC	QUE	SPR	INT	RIN	OUL	VIC
1971	March 701	Ford Cosworth DFV 3.0 V8	(United Kingdom) Ray Allen		6				Ret		
1971	March 701	Ford Cosworth DFV 3.0 V8	(United Kingdom) Derek Bell			15					
1971	March 701	Ford Cosworth DFV 3.0 V8	(United Kingdom) Cyd Williams				DNS				
1971	March 701	Ford Cosworth DFV 3.0 V8	(United Kingdom) Tony Trimmer							Ret	
1971	March 701	Ford Cosworth DFV 3.0 V8	(France) Henri Pescarolo	2							
1971	March 711	Ford Cosworth DFV 3.0 V8	(France) Henri Pescarolo			Ret		6	DNA	Ret	Ret
1971	March 711	Ford Cosworth DFV 3.0 V8	(Sweden) Ronnie Peterson		Ret						
1972	March 711	Ford Cosworth DFV 3.0 V8		ROC	BRA	INT	OUL	REP	VIC		
1972	March 711	Ford Cosworth DFV 3.0 V8	(Brazil) Carlos Pace		Ret						
1972	March 711	Ford Cosworth DFV 3.0 V8	(France) Henri Pescarolo					Ret			
1972	March 721	Ford Cosworth DFV 3.0 V8	(France) Henri Pescarolo		Ret	Ret	Ret				
1972	Politoys FX3	Ford Cosworth DFV 3.0 V8	(New Zealand) Chris Amon						Ret		
1973	Iso–Marlboro FX3B; Iso–Marlboro IR	Ford Cosworth DFV 3.0 V8		ROC	INT						
1973	Iso–Marlboro FX3B; Iso–Marlboro IR	Ford Cosworth DFV 3.0 V8	(United Kingdom) Tony Trimmer	4							
1973	Iso–Marlboro FX3B; Iso–Marlboro IR	Ford Cosworth DFV 3.0 V8	(New Zealand) Howden Ganley	Ret	Ret						
1974	Iso–Marlboro FW	Ford Cosworth DFV 3.0 V8		PRE	ROC	INT					
1974	Iso–Marlboro FW	Ford Cosworth DFV 3.0 V8	(Italy) Arturo Merzario	3							
1975	Williams FW03	Ford Cosworth DFV 3.0 V8		ROC	INT	SUI					
1975	Williams FW03	Ford Cosworth DFV 3.0 V8	(Italy) Arturo Merzario	7	DNS						
1975	Williams FW03	Ford Cosworth DFV 3.0 V8	(Italy) Maurizio Flammini	DNS							
1975	Williams FW03	Ford Cosworth DFV 3.0 V8	(France) Jacques Laffite			11					
1975	Williams FW03	Ford Cosworth DFV 3.0 V8	(Switzerland) Jo Vonlanthen			Ret					
1976	Wolf–Williams FW05	Ford Cosworth DFV 3.0 V8		ROC	INT						
1976	Wolf–Williams FW05	Ford Cosworth DFV 3.0 V8	(Belgium) Jacky Ickx	3	Ret						
1976	Wolf–Williams FW05	Ford Cosworth DFV 3.0 V8	(United States) Mario Andretti		7						
