= 1977 German Grand Prix =

Formula One motor race held in 1977

- Race 11 of 17 in the 1977 Formula One season

Race details
- Date: 31 July 1977
- Official name: XXXIX Großer Preis von Deutschland
- Location: Hockenheimring
- Course: Permanent racing facility
- Course length: 6.790 km (4.219 miles)
- Distance: 47 laps, 319.083 km (198.246 miles)
- Weather: Dry

Pole position
Driver	(South Africa) Jody Scheckter	Wolf-Ford
- Time: 1:53.07

Fastest lap
Driver	(Austria) Niki Lauda	Ferrari
- Time: 1:55.99 on lap 28

Podium
First	(Austria) Niki Lauda	Ferrari
Second	(South Africa) Jody Scheckter	Wolf-Ford
Third	(West Germany) Hans-Joachim Stuck	Brabham-Alfa Romeo

The 1977 German Grand Prix was a Formula One motor race held at Hockenheimring on 31 July 1977. It was the eleventh race of the 1977 World Championship of F1 Drivers and the 1977 International Cup for F1 Constructors.

The German Grand Prix was moved to Hockenheim following Niki Lauda's accident at the Nürburgring in 1976. This was the second time the race was held at Hockenheim, the first being in 1970.

The 47-lap race was won by Lauda, driving a Ferrari. Jody Scheckter finished second in a Wolf-Ford, having started from pole position, while Hans-Joachim Stuck was third in a Brabham-Alfa Romeo.

During the race, Penske driver Hans Heyer participated despite not qualifying. Mechanical issues forced Heyer to retire on lap 9, which caused his participation to be discovered. He was disqualified, making him the only driver to not qualify, not finish and be disqualified in a single race.

== Report ==
In qualifying, Jody Scheckter took his first pole of the season, ahead of John Watson and then Niki Lauda who headed the second row. The start of the race was given by the German national flag due to red/green lights being damaged by a service vehicle, which as a result caused an accident near the back of the grid between Alan Jones and Clay Regazzoni (putting both drivers out on the spot). Scheckter kept the lead at the first corner with both Watson and Lauda keeping their positions. Watson put pressure on Scheckter until his engine failed on the eighth lap, giving second to Lauda who passed Scheckter soon after and began to pull away. Scheckter battled for second with James Hunt until the defending champion retired with an engine failure which was caused by a broken fuel pump on lap 33, thus giving third to Watson's teammate and home driver Hans-Joachim Stuck. That was how it stayed to the end; Lauda winning from Scheckter and Stuck, whilst the rest of the points were rounded-out with Lauda's teammate Carlos Reutemann, Vittorio Brambilla in the Surtees and Patrick Tambay in the Ensign. This was the 100th World Championship race victory for tyre manufacturer Goodyear.

== Classification ==
=== Qualifying classification ===
Pos.	Driver	Constructor	Time	Grid
1	(South Africa) Jody Scheckter	Wolf-Ford	1:53.07	1
2	(United Kingdom) John Watson	Brabham-Alfa Romeo	1:53.34	2
3	(Austria) Niki Lauda	Ferrari	1:53.53	3
4	(United Kingdom) James Hunt	McLaren-Ford	1:53.68	4
5	(West Germany) Hans-Joachim Stuck	Brabham-Alfa Romeo	1:53.91	5
6	(France) Jacques Laffite	Ligier-Matra	1:53.97	6
7	(United States) Mario Andretti	Lotus-Ford	1:53.99	7
8	(Argentina) Carlos Reutemann	Ferrari	1:54.27	8
9	(Sweden) Gunnar Nilsson	Lotus-Ford	1:54.44	9
10	(Italy) Vittorio Brambilla	Surtees-Ford	1:54.53	10
11	(France) Patrick Tambay	Ensign-Ford	1:54.77	11
12	(France) Jean-Pierre Jarier	Penske-Ford	1:55.19	12
13	(West Germany) Jochen Mass	McLaren-Ford	1:55.25	13
14	(Sweden) Ronnie Peterson	Tyrrell-Ford	1:55.70	14
15	(France) Patrick Depailler	Tyrrell-Ford	1:55.92	15
16	(Italy) Riccardo Patrese	Shadow-Ford	1:56.09	16
17	(Australia) Alan Jones	Shadow-Ford	1:56.22	17
18	(South Africa) Ian Scheckter	March-Ford	1:56.35	18
19	(Australia) Vern Schuppan	Surtees-Ford	1:56.54	19
20	(Brazil) Alex Ribeiro	March-Ford	1:56.63	20
21	(United States) Brett Lunger	McLaren-Ford	1:56.64	21
22	(Switzerland) Clay Regazzoni	Ensign-Ford	1:56.68	22
23	(United Kingdom) Rupert Keegan	Hesketh-Ford	1:56.89	23
24	(Mexico) Héctor Rebaque	Hesketh-Ford	1:57.18	24
Cut-off
25	(Belgium) Patrick Nève	March-Ford	1:57.26	—
26	(Spain) Emilio de Villota	McLaren-Ford	1:57.39	—
27	(West Germany) Hans Heyer	Penske-Ford	1:57.58	PL
28	(Brazil) Emerson Fittipaldi	Fittipaldi-Ford	1:58.53	—
29	(Italy) Arturo Merzario	March-Ford	1:59.13	—
30	(Belgium) Teddy Pilette	BRM	1:59.55	—

=== Race classification ===
Pos	No	Driver	Constructor	Laps	Time/Retired	Grid	Points
1	11	(Austria) Niki Lauda	Ferrari	47	1:31:49.3	3	9
2	20	(South Africa) Jody Scheckter	Wolf-Ford	47	+ 14.33	1	6
3	8	(West Germany) Hans-Joachim Stuck	Brabham-Alfa Romeo	47	+ 20.90	5	4
4	12	(Argentina) Carlos Reutemann	Ferrari	47	+ 1:00.27	8	3
5	19	(Italy) Vittorio Brambilla	Surtees-Ford	47	+ 1:27.37	10	2
6	23	(France) Patrick Tambay	Ensign-Ford	47	+ 1:29.81	11	1
7	18	(Australia) Vern Schuppan	Surtees-Ford	46	+ 1 Lap	19	
8	9	(Brazil) Alex Ribeiro	March-Ford	46	+ 1 Lap	20	
9	3	(Sweden) Ronnie Peterson	Tyrrell-Ford	42	Engine	14	
10	16	(Italy) Riccardo Patrese	Shadow-Ford	42	Wheel	16	
Ret	24	(United Kingdom) Rupert Keegan	Hesketh-Ford	40	Accident	23	
Ret	5	(United States) Mario Andretti	Lotus-Ford	34	Engine	7	
Ret	1	(United Kingdom) James Hunt	McLaren-Ford	32	Fuel Pump	4	
Ret	6	(Sweden) Gunnar Nilsson	Lotus-Ford	31	Engine	9	
Ret	2	(West Germany) Jochen Mass	McLaren-Ford	26	Gearbox	13	
Ret	4	(France) Patrick Depailler	Tyrrell-Ford	22	Engine	15	
Ret	26	(France) Jacques Laffite	Ligier-Matra	21	Engine	6	
Ret	25	(Mexico) Héctor Rebaque	Hesketh-Ford	20	Engine	24	
Ret	30	(United States) Brett Lunger	McLaren-Ford	14	Accident	21	
Ret	10	(South Africa) Ian Scheckter	March-Ford	9	Clutch	18	
Ret	7	(United Kingdom) John Watson	Brabham-Alfa Romeo	8	Engine	2	
Ret	34	(France) Jean-Pierre Jarier	Penske-Ford	5	Transmission	12	
Ret	17	(Australia) Alan Jones	Shadow-Ford	0	Accident	17	
Ret	22	(Switzerland) Clay Regazzoni	Ensign-Ford	0	Accident	22	
DSQ	35	(West Germany) Hans Heyer	Penske-Ford	9	Gear linkage, took part illegally	PL	
DNQ	27	(Belgium) Patrick Nève	March-Ford				
DNQ	36	(Spain) Emilio de Villota	McLaren-Ford				
DNQ	28	(Brazil) Emerson Fittipaldi	Fittipaldi-Ford				
DNQ	37	(Italy) Arturo Merzario	March-Ford				
DNQ	40	(Belgium) Teddy Pilette	BRM				

== Notes ==
- This was the Formula One World Championship debut and only Grand Prix for German driver Hans Heyer.
- This was the 200th Grand Prix start for a Swiss driver. In those 200 races, Swiss drivers had won 6 Grands Prix, achieved 31 podium finishes, 7 pole positions, 17 fastest laps and 2 Grand Slams.
- This race saw the first pole position set by Wolf and the first for a Canadian constructor.
- This was the 10th German Grand Prix victory for Ferrari as a constructor and as an engine supplier.
- To date, this is the last Formula One Grand Prix where the race was started by the drop of a flag. Since this race, every race has been started using a traffic light sequence.

== Championship standings after the race ==
Drivers' Championship standings

	Pos	Driver	Points
	1	(Austria) Niki Lauda	48
1	2	(South Africa) Jody Scheckter	38
1	3	(United States) Mario Andretti	32
	4	(Argentina) Carlos Reutemann	31
	5	(United Kingdom) James Hunt	22

Constructors' Championship standings

	Pos	Constructor	Points
	1	(Italy) Ferrari	65 (67)
	2	(United Kingdom) Lotus-Ford	47
1	3	(Canada) Wolf-Ford	38
1	4	(United Kingdom) McLaren-Ford	34
	5	(United Kingdom) Brabham-Alfa Romeo	23

- Note: Only the top five positions are included for both sets of standings. Only the best 8 results from the first 9 races and the best 7 results from the remaining 8 races were retained. Numbers without parentheses are retained points; numbers in parentheses are total points scored.

Previous race: 1977 British Grand Prix	FIA Formula One World Championship; 1977 season	Next race: 1977 Austrian Grand Prix
Previous race: 1976 German Grand Prix; Previous race at the Hockenheimring: 1970 German Grand Prix	German Grand Prix	Next race: 1978 German Grand Prix
