= 1976 Spanish Grand Prix =

Race 4 of 16 in the 1976 Formula One season
← Previous race	Next race →

Race details
- Date: 2 May 1976
- Official name: XXII Gran Premio de España
- Location: Jarama, Spain
- Course: Permanent racing facility
- Course length: 3.404 km (2.115 miles)
- Distance: 75 laps, 255.3 km (158.625 miles)

Pole position
Driver	(United Kingdom) James Hunt	McLaren-Ford
- Time: 1:18.52

Fastest lap
Driver	(West Germany) Jochen Mass	McLaren-Ford
- Time: 1:20.93 on lap 52

Podium
First	(United Kingdom) James Hunt	McLaren-Ford
Second	(Austria) Niki Lauda	Ferrari
Third	(Sweden) Gunnar Nilsson	Lotus-Ford

The 1976 Spanish Grand Prix (formally the XXII Gran Premio de España) was a Formula One motor race held at the Circuito del Jarama in Madrid, Spain on 2 May 1976. The race was the fourth round of the 1976 Formula One season. The race was the 22nd Spanish Grand Prix and the sixth to be held at Jarama. The race was held over 75 laps of the 3.404-kilometre circuit for a total race distance of 255 kilometres.

Initially the declared winner was Austrian Ferrari driver Niki Lauda driving a Ferrari 312T2 extending his Drivers' Championship lead to 23 points after first across the line James Hunt had his McLaren M23 disqualified in post-race scrutineering. Swedish driver Gunnar Nilsson took his Lotus 77 to second place with Carlos Reutemann finishing third in his Brabham BT45.

McLaren appealed the disqualification and in July the appeal was upheld and Hunt re-instated as winner of the Spanish Grand Prix.

== Summary ==
As the European season began, new cars were launched as organisers were due to start enforcing new regulations for 1976 having allowed an easing in period over the first three races. There was a big talking point as the Tyrrell team entered a new P34 six-wheeler for Patrick Depailler. Depailler was on the pace and qualified third, behind Hunt and Lauda. Lauda, driving with broken ribs after an accident driving a tractor once again beat Hunt off the line at the start and led for the first third of the race. Depailler, after a slow start, was running fourth behind Mass when he spun off and crashed with brake problems. Just before mid-race, the McLarens of Hunt and Mass found another gear and drove past Lauda, but towards the end of the race, Mass had to retire with an engine failure. Hunt took his first win of the season, with Lauda second and Gunnar Nilsson's Lotus third.

After the race, scrutineers examined the bulk of the field and Hunt was disqualified because his McLaren was found to be 1.5 cm (0.59 in) too wide and Lauda was declared the winner. One of the new rules which came into force on 1 May 1976 defined how wide a Formula One car could be. McLaren appealed the decision. Two months after the race, McLaren's appeal was successful as the tribunal considered that the 1.5 cm difference was "minimal" and Hunt was reinstated as the winner of the Spanish Grand Prix.

On the same day in the US, McLaren's USAC team won the Indy car race at Trenton Speedway with driver Johnny Rutherford in an M16-Offenhauser, thus accomplishing the rare feat of winning both a Formula 1 Grand Prix and an Indy car race on the same day.

Chris Amon's 5th place made him the last driver from New Zealand to score points in Formula One until Brendon Hartley finished 10th in the 2018 Azerbaijan Grand Prix some 42 years later.

== Classification ==
=== Qualifying ===
Pos.	Driver	Constructor	Time/Gap
1	(United Kingdom) James Hunt	McLaren–Ford	1:18.52
2	(Austria) Niki Lauda	Ferrari	+0.32
3	(France) Patrick Depailler	Tyrrell–Ford	+0.59
4	(West Germany) Jochen Mass	McLaren–Ford	+0.62
5	(Switzerland) Clay Regazzoni	Ferrari	+0.63
6	(Italy) Vittorio Brambilla	March–Ford	+0.75
7	(Sweden) Gunnar Nilsson	Lotus–Ford	+0.83
8	(France) Jacques Laffite	Ligier–Matra	+0.87
9	(United States) Mario Andretti	Lotus–Ford	+1.07
10	(New Zealand) Chris Amon	Ensign–Ford	+1.31
11	(Brazil) Carlos Pace	Brabham–Alfa Romeo	+1.41
12	(Argentina) Carlos Reutemann	Brabham–Alfa Romeo	+1.60
13	(United Kingdom) John Watson	Penske–Ford	+1.65
14	(South Africa) Jody Scheckter	Tyrrell–Ford	+1.67
15	(France) Jean-Pierre Jarier	Shadow–Ford	+1.69
16	(Sweden) Ronnie Peterson	March–Ford	+1.82
17	(West Germany) Hans-Joachim Stuck	March–Ford	+1.88
18	(Italy) Arturo Merzario	March–Ford	+2.11
19	(Brazil) Emerson Fittipaldi	Fittipaldi–Ford	+2.19
20	(Australia) Alan Jones	Surtees–Ford	+2.35
21	(Belgium) Jacky Ickx	Wolf-Williams–Ford	+2.61
22	(United Kingdom) Tom Pryce	Shadow–Ford	+2.67
23	(France) Michel Leclère	Wolf-Williams–Ford	+2.77
24	(Australia) Larry Perkins	Boro–Ford	+3.00
25	(United States) Brett Lunger	Surtees–Ford	+3.44
26	(Switzerland) Loris Kessel	Brabham–Ford	+3.53
27	(Spain) Emilio Zapico	Williams–Ford	+3.70
28	(Spain) Emilio de Villota	Brabham–Ford	+4.37
29	(Austria) Harald Ertl	Hesketh–Ford	+4.40
30	(Brazil) Ingo Hoffmann	Fittipaldi–Ford	+34.60

*Drivers with a red background failed to qualify

=== Race ===
Pos	No	Driver	Constructor	Laps	Time/Retired	Grid	Points
1	11	(United Kingdom) James Hunt	McLaren-Ford	75	1:42:20.43	1	9
2	1	(Austria) Niki Lauda	Ferrari	75	+ 30.97	2	6
3	6	(Sweden) Gunnar Nilsson	Lotus-Ford	75	+ 48.02	7	4
4	7	(Argentina) Carlos Reutemann	Brabham-Alfa Romeo	74	+ 1 lap	12	3
5	22	(New Zealand) Chris Amon	Ensign-Ford	74	+ 1 lap	10	2
6	8	(Brazil) Carlos Pace	Brabham-Alfa Romeo	74	+ 1 lap	11	1
7	20	(Belgium) Jacky Ickx	Wolf-Williams-Ford	74	+ 1 lap	21	
8	16	(United Kingdom) Tom Pryce	Shadow-Ford	74	+ 1 lap	22	
9	19	(Australia) Alan Jones	Surtees-Ford	74	+ 1 lap	20	
10	21	(France) Michel Leclère	Wolf-Williams-Ford	73	+ 2 laps	23	
11	2	(Switzerland) Clay Regazzoni	Ferrari	72	+ 3 laps	5	
12	26	(France) Jacques Laffite	Ligier-Matra	72	+ 3 laps	8	
13	37	(Australia) Larry Perkins	Boro-Ford	72	+ 3 laps	24	
Ret	12	(Germany) Jochen Mass	McLaren-Ford	65	Engine	4	
Ret	17	(France) Jean-Pierre Jarier	Shadow-Ford	61	Electrical	15	
Ret	3	(South Africa) Jody Scheckter	Tyrrell-Ford	53	Engine	14	
Ret	28	(United Kingdom) John Watson	Penske-Ford	51	Engine	13	
Ret	35	(Italy) Arturo Merzario	March-Ford	36	Gearbox	18	
Ret	5	(United States) Mario Andretti	Lotus-Ford	34	Gearbox	9	
Ret	4	(France) Patrick Depailler	Tyrrell-Ford	25	Accident	3	
Ret	9	(Italy) Vittorio Brambilla	March-Ford	21	Suspension	6	
Ret	34	(Germany) Hans Joachim Stuck	March-Ford	16	Gearbox	17	
Ret	10	(Sweden) Ronnie Peterson	March-Ford	11	Transmission	16	
Ret	30	(Brazil) Emerson Fittipaldi	Fittipaldi-Ford	3	Transmission	19	
DNQ	18	(United States) Brett Lunger	Surtees-Ford				
DNQ	32	(Switzerland) Loris Kessel	Brabham-Ford				
DNQ	25	(Spain) Emilio Zapico	Williams-Ford				
DNQ	33	(Spain) Emilio de Villota	Brabham-Ford				
DNQ	24	(Austria) Harald Ertl	Hesketh-Ford				
DNQ	31	(Brazil) Ingo Hoffmann	Fittipaldi-Ford				

== Notes ==
- This was the Formula One World Championship debut for Swiss driver Loris Kessel and Spanish drivers Emilio Zapico and Emilio de Villota.
- This was the Formula One World Championship debut for Dutch constructor Boro - the first constructor from the Netherlands to participate in Formula One.
- This was the 50th Grand Prix start for French engine supplier Matra.

== Championship standings after the race ==
Points shown represent points standings after the race when Hunt was disqualified. His nine points for winning the race were not re-instated until much later in the season.

Drivers' Championship standings

Pos	Driver	Points
1	(Austria) Niki Lauda	33
2	(France) Patrick Depailler	10
3	(Switzerland) Clay Regazzoni	9
4	(Germany) Jochen Mass	7
5	(United Kingdom) James Hunt	6

Constructors' Championship standings

	Pos	Constructor	Points
	1	(Italy) Ferrari	36
	2	(United Kingdom) Tyrrell-Ford	13
	3	(United Kingdom) McLaren-Ford	9
5	4	(United Kingdom) Lotus-Ford	4
5	5	(United Kingdom) Brabham-Alfa Romeo	4

- Note: Only the top five positions are included for both sets of standings.
- Note 2: Results as shown are before any changes due to decision of stewards.

Previous race: 1976 United States Grand Prix West	FIA Formula One World Championship; 1976 season	Next race: 1976 Belgian Grand Prix
Previous race: 1975 Spanish Grand Prix	Spanish Grand Prix	Next race: 1977 Spanish Grand Prix
