= 1976 British Grand Prix =

Race 9 of 16 in the 1976 Formula One season
← Previous race	Next race →

Race details
- Date: 18 July 1976
- Official name: XXIX John Player Grand Prix
- Location: Brands Hatch, Kent, England
- Course: Permanent racing facility
- Course length: 4.206 km (2.613 miles)
- Distance: 76 laps, 319.656 km (198.588 miles)
- Weather: Dry

Pole position
Driver	(Austria) Niki Lauda	Ferrari
- Time: 1:19.35

Fastest lap
Driver	(Austria) Niki Lauda	Ferrari
- Time: 1:19.91 on lap 41

Podium
First	(Austria) Niki Lauda	Ferrari
Second	(South Africa) Jody Scheckter	Tyrrell-Ford
Third	(United Kingdom) John Watson	Penske-Ford

The 1976 British Grand Prix (formally the John Player Grand Prix) was a Formula One motor race held on 18 July 1976 at the Brands Hatch circuit in Kent, England, United Kingdom. The 76-lap race was the ninth round of the 1976 Formula One season.

British driver James Hunt was involved in a first corner crash that brought out the red flags. Hunt drove his damaged car back to the pits, but did not complete a full lap of the track to do so, instead driving through an access road on the Cooper Straight. The officials declared that, since he had not been on the circuit when the red flag was waved, Hunt would not be allowed to take part in the restart. This news led to much angry feeling amongst the British crowd, who chanted Hunt's name until the stewards, fearing crowd trouble, announced that Hunt would be allowed to take the restart. Hunt duly won the restarted race. Immediately after the race, the Ferrari, Tyrrell and Fittipaldi teams protested against the inclusion of Hunt's car. In September, two months after the event, a decision was reached and Hunt was disqualified, giving Niki Lauda the race win.

== Report ==
=== Background ===
This was the only Formula One Grand Prix in which multiple female racers (Lella Lombardi and Divina Galica) were entered. Neither qualified for the Grand Prix. This was the Formula One World Championship debut for Galica - the third woman driver to enter into Formula One.

The Brands Hatch layout had been modified from the previous year. Paddock Hill, Bottom Straight (renamed Cooper Straight) and South Bank (renamed Surtees) had all been slightly modified. The pit lane was extended and many of the corners were renamed, all after racing drivers and teams.

=== Race ===
At the start, Hunt made a relatively poor start and allowed Lauda to pull away. By contrast, Clay Regazzoni starting from fourth made a good start from the second row, and attempted to take the lead from Lauda at the first corner. Regazzoni made contact with his Ferrari team-mate which resulted in a broken rear wheel on Lauda's car, and him spinning his own car. Regazzoni's car was then hit by cars behind, resulting in damage to several more cars including those of Hunt and Jacques Laffite. Due to the amount of debris covering the track as a result, the race was stopped.

The McLaren, Ferrari and Ligier teams set about preparing the spare cars for Hunt, Regazzoni and Laffite respectively in the belief that there was insufficient time for their original cars to be repaired. However, the race stewards announced that no driver would be allowed to take part in the restarted race unless they were in their original car, and that they had finished the first lap of the original race. This meant that the spare cars could not be used, and the drivers that had returned to the pits at the end of the first lap would not be allowed to restart.

Some debate then ensued, during which time the McLaren mechanics managed to repair Hunt's damaged McLaren which he had used in the original start. Despite having failed to complete the first lap, Hunt was now at least not in a replacement car, and with the crowds chanting "We Want Hunt" with bottles and other litter thrown to the track with the potential of crowd trouble with the British fans, the stewards relented and allowed Hunt to take the restart. In the event, both Regazzoni and Laffite also took the restart, although both in replacement cars, with the two teams opting to compete anyway and face possible exclusion after the race.

At the second attempt to start the race, Lauda again led the field, with Hunt second, Regazzoni third and Scheckter fourth. Laffite retired on lap 32 and Regazzoni on lap 37 due to suspension problems and low oil pressure respectively.

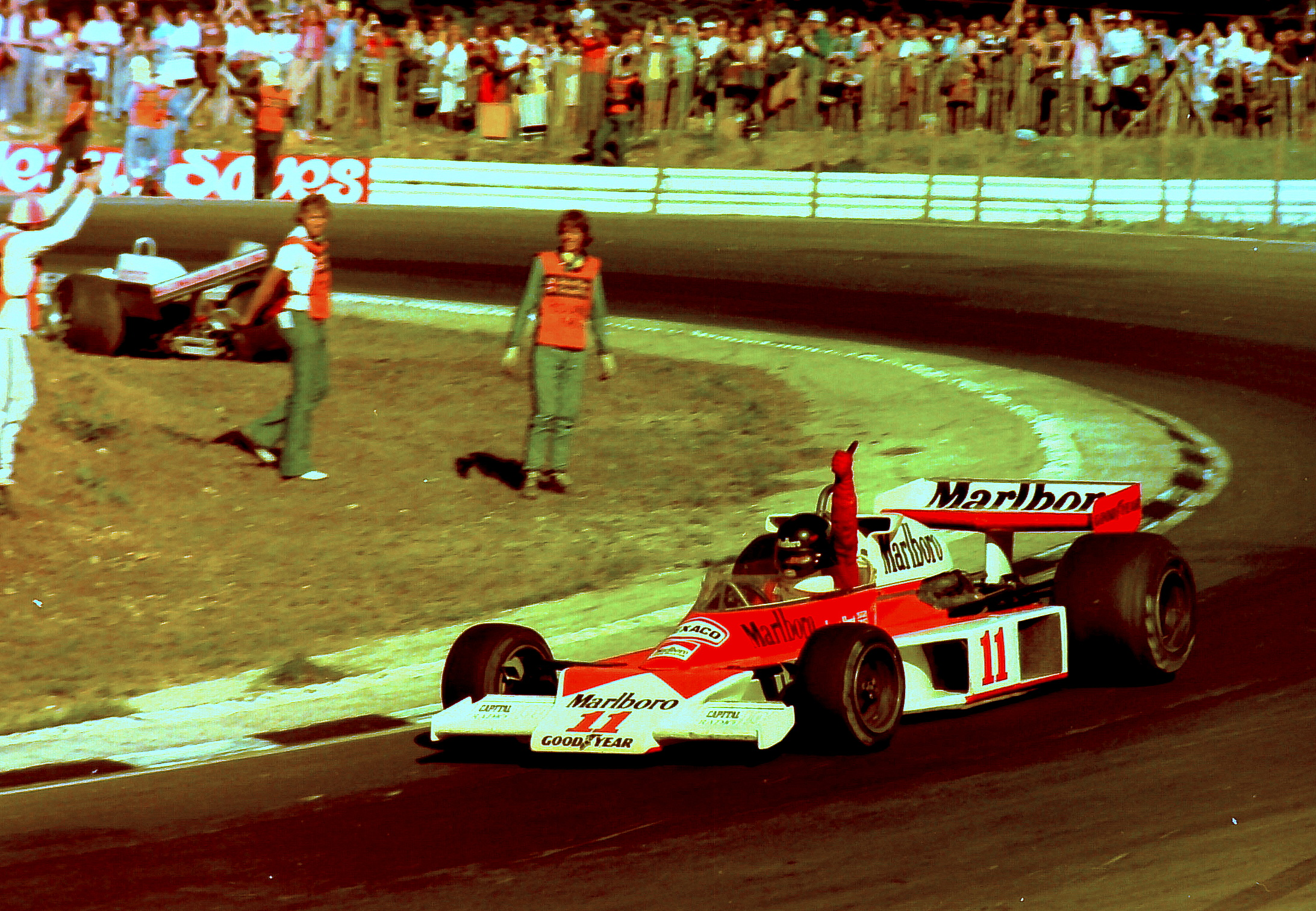
James Hunt crossed the finish line in first position, but was disqualified after the race.

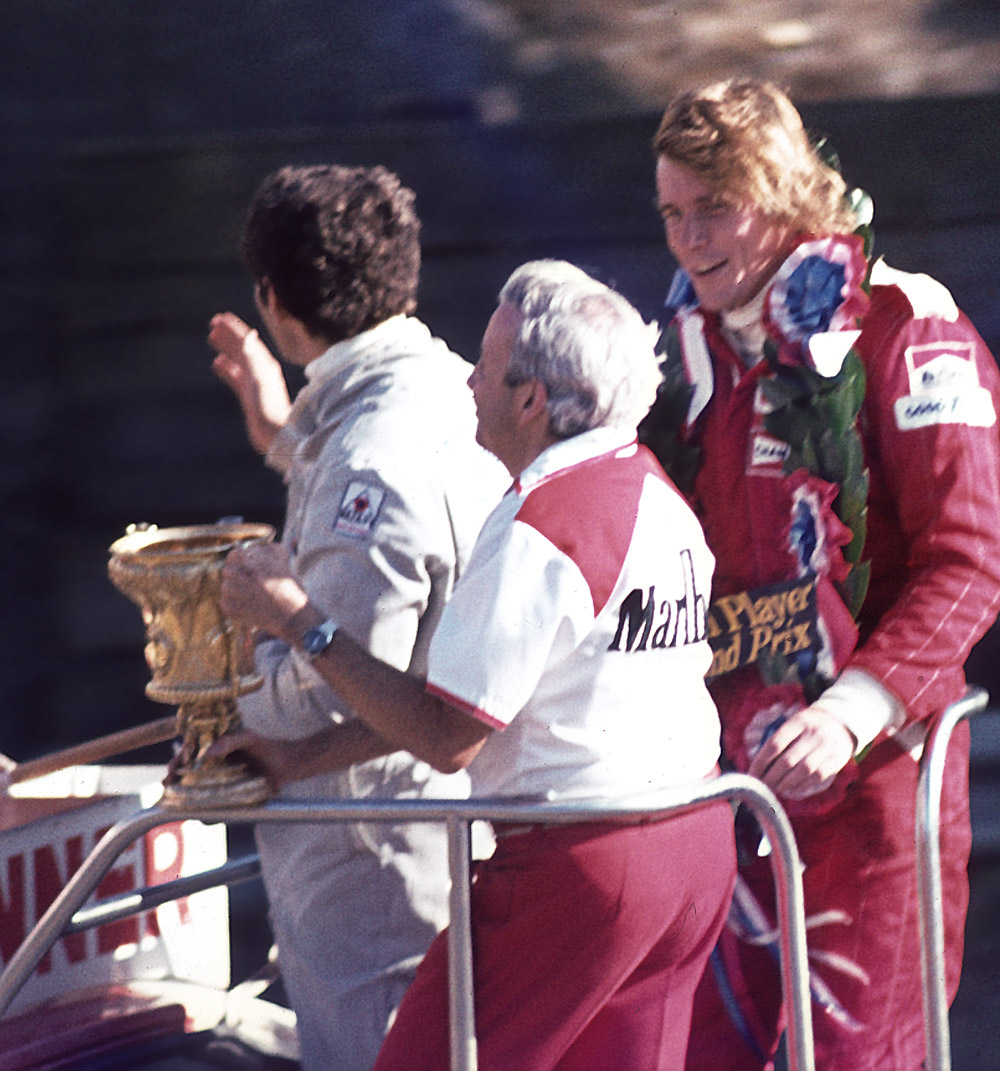
Hunt (right) on the winners' rostrum

Lauda led the race for the first 45 laps, until gearshift problems allowed Hunt to overtake him. Hunt continued to build up a lead from Lauda for the rest of the race, and crossed the finish line in first position.

=== Post-race ===
Immediately following the race, the Ferrari, Tyrrell and Copersucar teams protested the result to the stewards. The three teams believed that as Hunt had not completed a lap following the accident, under the then-regulations, he should not have been allowed to take the restart. Following a three-hour meeting, the officials dismissed the protests and announced the original result would stand.

Ferrari announced that they would submit an appeal to the RAC, the governing body of motorsport in Britain who were responsible for sanctioning and organizing the British Grand Prix. A meeting was held in London on 4 August, where the Ferrari team again put forward their view that Hunt did not complete a lap, and therefore should not have been permitted to take part in the restart. In explaining their reason for dismissing the appeal, the RAC stated that although Hunt did not finish the lap, his car was still moving at the time the race was stopped, and this was sufficient to allow him to restart.

Ferrari then protested the result to the FIA, which resulted in a tribunal being convened to hear Ferrari's appeal. The tribunal was held in Paris on 25 September, where Ferrari put forward their belief that Hunt's car had been pushed by his mechanics before the race had been halted, breaking the regulation prohibiting outside assistance during the race. McLaren maintained that they had only pushed the car after the race had been stopped.

Indeed, then-McLaren Team Manager Alastair Caldwell has since stated that the rules at the time stated cars should come to a halt where they were when a red flag is shown. Other drivers continued to complete the first lap at racing speed, attempting to encourage the red flag to be withdrawn as had happened on previous occasions, while McLaren were able to show TV footage proving that Hunt's car had stopped at the red flag, and only after then received outside assistance to return to the pits. In Caldwell's view, the only car which correctly complied with the red flag rules and should have been safe from disqualification from this incident was in fact Hunt's.

The decision reached by the tribunal was to uphold the appeal by Ferrari, and disqualify Hunt from the race. This in turn resulted in all the other drivers moving up one position, and hence making Lauda the winner of the race.

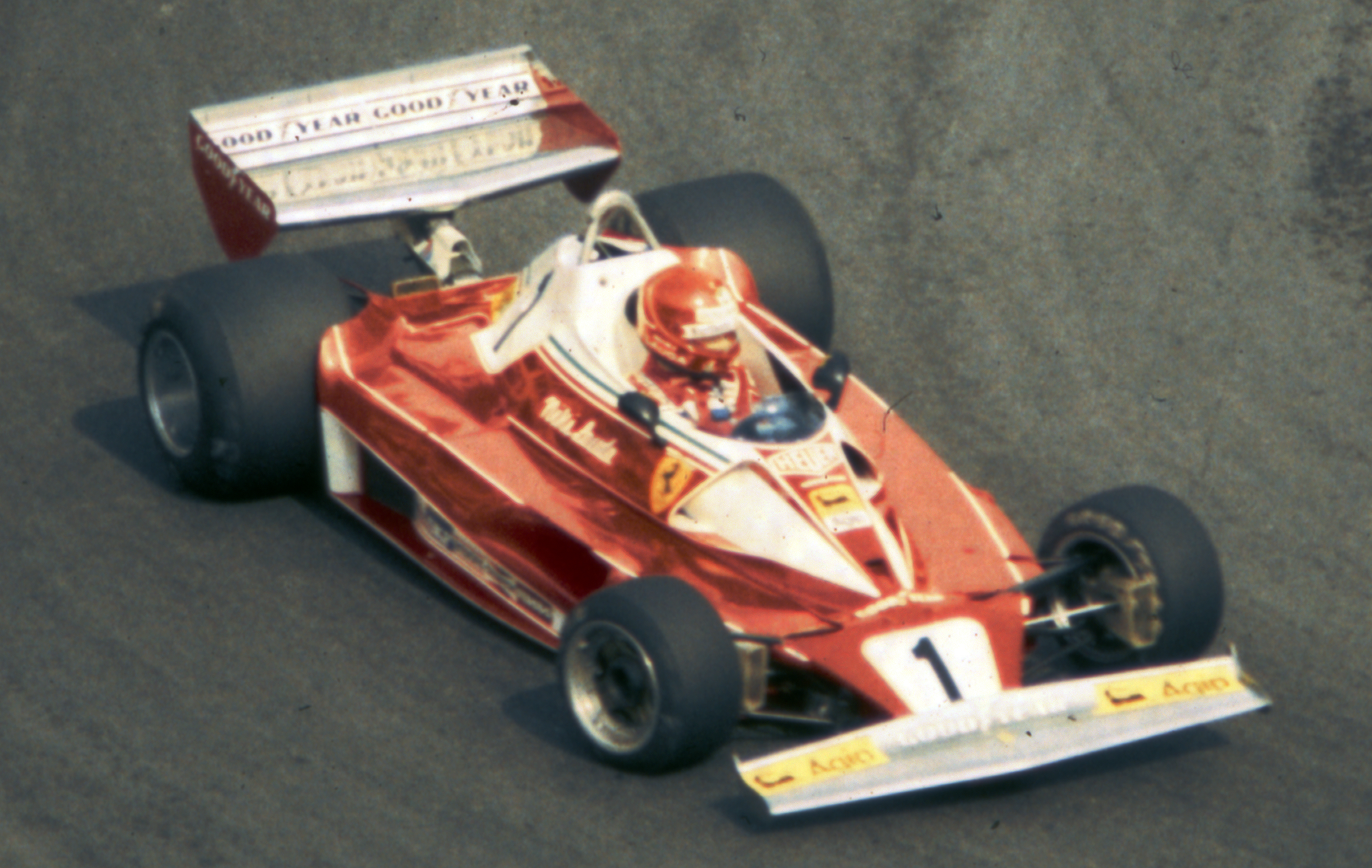
Niki Lauda at the 1976 British Grand Prix.

== Classification ==
=== Qualifying classification ===
Pos.	Driver	Constructor	Time	No
1	Niki Lauda	Ferrari	1:19.35	1
2	James Hunt	McLaren-Ford	1:19.41	2
3	Mario Andretti	Lotus-Ford	1:19.76	3
4	Clay Regazzoni	Ferrari	1:20.05	4
5	Patrick Depailler	Tyrrell-Ford	1:20.15	5
6	Chris Amon	Ensign-Ford	1:20.27	6
7	Ronnie Peterson	March-Ford	1:20.29	7
8	Jody Scheckter	Tyrrell-Ford	1:20.31	8
9	Arturo Merzario	March-Ford	1:20.32	9
10	Vittorio Brambilla	March-Ford	1:20.36	10
11	John Watson	Penske-Ford	1:20.41	11
12	Jochen Mass	McLaren-Ford	1:20.61	12
13	Jacques Laffite	Ligier-Matra	1:20.67	13
14	Gunnar Nilsson	Lotus-Ford	1:20.67	14
15	Carlos Reutemann	Brabham-Alfa Romeo	1:20.99	15
16	Carlos Pace	Brabham-Alfa Romeo	1:21.03	16
17	Hans-Joachim Stuck	March-Ford	1:21.20	17
18	Brett Lunger	Surtees-Ford	1:21.30	18
19	Alan Jones	Surtees-Ford	1:21.42	19
20	Tom Pryce	Shadow-Ford	1:21.84	20
21	Emerson Fittipaldi	Copersucar-Ford	1:22.06	21
22	Bob Evans	Brabham-Ford	1:22.47	22
23	Jean-Pierre Jarier	Shadow-Ford	1:22.72	23
24	Harald Ertl	Hesketh-Ford	1:22.75	24
25	Guy Edwards	Hesketh-Ford	1:22.76	25
26	Henri Pescarolo	Surtees-Ford	1:22.76	26
DNQ	Jacky Ickx	Wolf-Williams-Ford	1:23.32	—
DNQ	Divina Galica	Surtees-Ford	1:25.24	—
DNQ	Mike Wilds	Shadow-Ford	1:25.66	—
DNQ	Lella Lombardi	Brabham-Ford	1:27.08	—

=== Race classification ===
Pos	No	Driver	Constructor	Laps	Time/Retired	Grid	Points
1	1	(Austria) Niki Lauda	Ferrari	76	1:44:19.66	1	9
2	3	(South Africa) Jody Scheckter	Tyrrell-Ford	76	+ 16.18	8	6
3	28	(United Kingdom) John Watson	Penske-Ford	75	+ 1 Lap	11	4
4	16	(United Kingdom) Tom Pryce	Shadow-Ford	75	+ 1 Lap	20	3
5	19	(Australia) Alan Jones	Surtees-Ford	75	+ 1 Lap	19	2
6	30	(Brazil) Emerson Fittipaldi	Fittipaldi-Ford	74	+ 2 Laps	21	1
7	24	(Austria) Harald Ertl	Hesketh-Ford	73	+ 3 Laps	23 (Note: Jean-Pierre Jarier set a faster time than Harald Ertl in practice, but they swapped grid positions for both the original and restarted races.)	
8	8	(Brazil) Carlos Pace	Brabham-Alfa Romeo	73	+ 3 Laps	16	
9	17	(France) Jean-Pierre Jarier	Shadow-Ford	70	+ 6 Laps	24	
DSQ	11	(United Kingdom) James Hunt	McLaren-Ford	76	Outside assistance	2	
Ret	6	(Sweden) Gunnar Nilsson	Lotus-Ford	67	Engine	14	
Ret	10	(Sweden) Ronnie Peterson	March-Ford	60	Fuel system	7	
Ret	18	(United States) Brett Lunger	Surtees-Ford	55	Gearbox	18	
Ret	4	(France) Patrick Depailler	Tyrrell-Ford	47	Engine	5	
Ret	7	(Argentina) Carlos Reutemann	Brabham-Alfa Romeo	46	Oil pressure	15	
Ret	35	(Italy) Arturo Merzario	March-Ford	39	Engine	9	
DSQ (Note: The race stewards announced that drivers would not be allowed to take part in the restarted race unless they were in their original car. Regazzoni and Laffite took the restart in spare cars. Some sources list Regazzoni and Laffite as "disqualified" but others list them as "retired")	2	(Switzerland) Clay Regazzoni	Ferrari	36	Illegal car change	4	
DSQ	26	(France) Jacques Laffite	Ligier-Matra	31	Illegal car change	13	
Ret	32	(United Kingdom) Bob Evans	Brabham-Ford	24	Gearbox	22	
Ret	9	(Italy) Vittorio Brambilla	March-Ford	22	Accident	10	
Ret	38	(France) Henri Pescarolo	Surtees-Ford	16	Fuel system	26	
Ret	22	(New Zealand) Chris Amon	Ensign-Ford	8	Water leak	6	
Ret	5	(United States) Mario Andretti	Lotus-Ford	4	Ignition	3	
Ret	12	(West Germany) Jochen Mass	McLaren-Ford	1	Clutch	12	
Ret	34	(West Germany) Hans-Joachim Stuck	March-Ford	0	Accident	17	
Ret	25	(United Kingdom) Guy Edwards	Hesketh-Ford	0	Accident	25	
DNQ	20	(Belgium) Jacky Ickx	Wolf-Williams-Ford				
DNQ	13	(United Kingdom) Divina Galica	Surtees-Ford				
DNQ	40	(United Kingdom) Mike Wilds	Shadow-Ford				
DNQ	33	(Italy) Lella Lombardi	Brabham-Ford				

== Notes ==
- This was the 50th Grand Prix start for Shadow.

== Championship standings after the race ==
Drivers' Championship standings

	Pos	Driver	Points
	1	(Austria) Niki Lauda	58
2	2	(United Kingdom) James Hunt	35
	3	(South Africa) Jody Scheckter	28
2	4	(France) Patrick Depailler	26
	5	(Switzerland) Clay Regazzoni	16

Constructors' Championship standings

	Pos	Constructor	Points
	1	(Italy) Ferrari	61
	2	(United Kingdom) Tyrrell-Ford	41
	3	(United Kingdom) McLaren-Ford	40 (41)
	4	(France) Ligier-Matra	10
1	5	(United States) Penske-Ford	9

- Note: Only the top five positions are included for both sets of standings. Standings are as at the conclusion of the race, i.e. before Hunt's disqualification (which did not occur until 25 September). Numbers without parentheses are Championship points; numbers in parentheses are total points scored (only the best 7 results from the first 8 races of the season and the best 7 results from the last 8 races counted towards the Championship).

Previous race: 1976 French Grand Prix	FIA Formula One World Championship; 1976 season	Next race: 1976 German Grand Prix
Previous race: 1975 British Grand Prix	British Grand Prix	Next race: 1977 British Grand Prix
