= Tyrrell 007 =

Formula One racing car

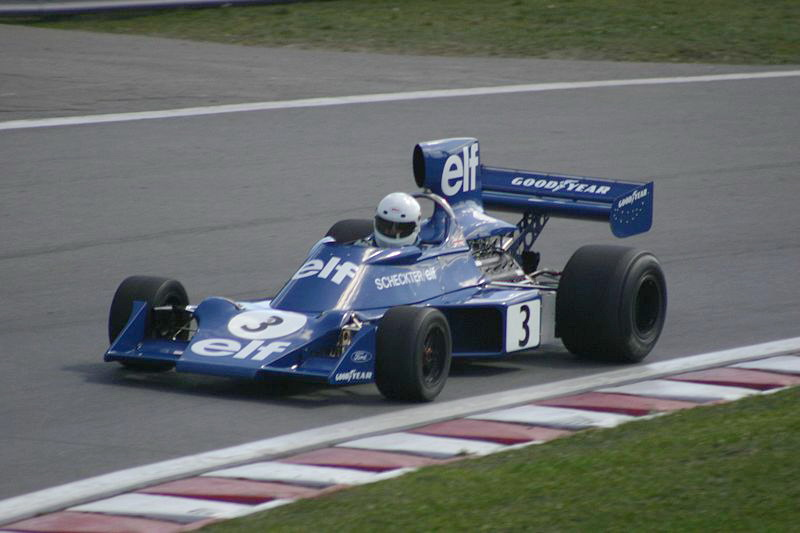
- An ex-Scheckter Tyrrell 007 being demonstrated at the 2004 Canadian Grand Prix
- Category: Formula One
- Constructor: Tyrrell
- Designer: Derek Gardner
- Predecessor: 006
- Successor: P34

Technical specifications
- Chassis: Aluminium monocoque.
- Suspension (front): Double wishbones, rocker arms, inboard coil springs over dampers
- Suspension (rear): Double wishbones, coil springs over dampers
- Axle track: Front: 1,590 mm (63 in); Rear: 1,575 mm (62.0 in)
- Wheelbase: 2,591 mm (102.0 in)
- Engine: Ford-Cosworth DFV 2,993 cc (182.6 cu in) 90° V8, naturally aspirated, mid-mounted.
- Transmission: Hewland FG 400 5-speed manual gearbox.
- Weight: 625 kg (1,378 lb)
- Fuel: Elf; Sasol
- Tyres: 1974-1976: Goodyear; 1976: Bridgestone; 1977: Dunlop

Competition history
- Notable entrants: Elf Team Tyrrell; Heros Racing
- Notable drivers: (France) Patrick Depailler (South Africa) Jody Scheckter
- Debut: 1974 Spanish Grand Prix
Races	Wins	Poles	F/Laps
37	3	1	1
- Constructors' Championships: 0
- Drivers' Championships: 0
- Unless otherwise stated, all data refer to Formula One World Championship Grands Prix only.

The Tyrrell 007 is a Formula One racing car, designed by Tyrrell's Chief Designer, Derek Gardner. It was used in the 1974, 1975, 1976 and 1977 Formula One seasons.

== Development ==
Ken Tyrrell, owner of Tyrrell Racing needed two new drivers for 1974 because Jackie Stewart retired from driving at the end of 1973 and François Cevert was killed at the 1973 season finale in the United States. The team had originally planned to have Cevert and Jody Scheckter as their driver line up for 1974. Following Cevert's death, Tyrrell signed Patrick Depailler as replacement. In the first three races of 1974, (Argentina, Brazil and South Africa), Tyrrell used the earlier 005 and 006 chassis.

== Racing history ==
=== Elf Team Tyrrell ===
==== 1974 ====
The Tyrrell 007 made its debut at the Spanish Grand Prix. Scheckter drove the 007 and finished fifth, Depailler raced the 006 and the 005 was no longer used. Two 007s raced at Belgium. At the start of the race, Clay Regazzoni's Ferrari took the lead ahead of Scheckter and Emerson Fittipaldi's McLaren. At the end of the first lap Fittipaldi passed Scheckter to take second place. At the Swedish Grand Prix, Scheckter won the race and Depailler finished second. At the Dutch Grand Prix Scheckter finished fifth and Depailler sixth. At the French Grand Prix, Scheckter took fourth and Depailler finished eighth in the 006. In the British Grand Prix Scheckter took the lead and won the race, engine failure took Depailler out of the race. In Germany, Depailler through an accident caused by broken suspension. At the Austrian Grand Prix Depailler retired after an accident. Peterson crossed the line less than a second ahead of Fittipaldi after 12 laps of battling in Italy. Scheckter finished third and Depailler finished eleventh.

The Tyrrell team scored 52 World Championship points; four points were scored by the 005 and the 007 scored 48 points, earning them third place in the Constructors' Championship standings.

==== 1975 ====
The Tyrrell team scored twenty five World Championship points, earning them fifth place in the Constructors' Championship standings.

==== 1976 ====
The Tyrrell team scored 71 World Championship points, 13 points were scored by the 007 and the Tyrrell P34 scored 58 points, earning them third place in the Constructors' Championship standings.

== Complete Formula One World Championship results ==
(key) (Races in bold indicate pole position; results in italics indicate fastest lap)

Year	Entrants	Engines	Tyres	Drivers	1	2	3	4	5	6	7	8	9	10	11	12	13	14	15	16	17	Points	WCC
1974	Elf Team Tyrrell	Ford Cosworth DFV; 3.0 V8	G		ARG	BRA	RSA	ESP	BEL	MON	SWE	NED	FRA	GBR	GER	AUT	ITA	CAN	USA			52^{1}	3rd^{1}
1974	Elf Team Tyrrell	Ford Cosworth DFV; 3.0 V8	G	Jody Scheckter				5	3	2	1	5	4	1	2	Ret	3	Ret	Ret			52^{1}	3rd^{1}
1974	Elf Team Tyrrell	Ford Cosworth DFV; 3.0 V8	G	Patrick Depailler					Ret	PO	**2**	6		Ret	Ret	Ret	11	5	6			52^{1}	3rd^{1}
1975	Elf Team Tyrrell	Ford Cosworth DFV; 3.0 V8	G		ARG	BRA	RSA	ESP	MON	BEL	SWE	NED	FRA	GBR	GER	AUT	ITA	USA				25	5th
1975	Elf Team Tyrrell	Ford Cosworth DFV; 3.0 V8	G	Jody Scheckter	11	Ret	1	Ret	7	2	7	16	9	3	Ret	8	8	6				25	5th
1975	Elf Team Tyrrell	Ford Cosworth DFV; 3.0 V8	G	Patrick Depailler	5	Ret	3	Ret	5	4	12	9	6	9	9	11	7	Ret				25	5th
1975	Elf Team Tyrrell	Ford Cosworth DFV; 3.0 V8	G	Jean-Pierre Jabouille									12									25	5th
1975	Elf Team Tyrrell	Ford Cosworth DFV; 3.0 V8	G	Michel Leclère														Ret				25	5th
1975	Lexington Racing	Ford Cosworth DFV; 3.0 V8	G	Ian Scheckter			Ret															25	5th
1976	Elf Team Tyrrell	Ford Cosworth DFV; 3.0 V8	G		BRA	RSA	USW	ESP	BEL	MON	SWE	FRA	GBR	GER	AUT	NED	ITA	CAN	USA	JPN		71^{2}	3rd^{2}
1976	Elf Team Tyrrell	Ford Cosworth DFV; 3.0 V8	G	Jody Scheckter	5	4	Ret	Ret														71^{2}	3rd^{2}
1976	Elf Team Tyrrell	Ford Cosworth DFV; 3.0 V8	G	Patrick Depailler	2	9	3															71^{2}	3rd^{2}
1976	Lexington Racing	Ford Cosworth DFV; 3.0 V8	G	Ian Scheckter		Ret																71^{2}	3rd^{2}
1976	Scuderia Gulf Rondini	Ford Cosworth DFV; 3.0 V8	G	Alessandro Pesenti-Rossi										14	11	DNQ	18					71^{2}	3rd^{2}
1976	ÖASC Racing Team	Ford Cosworth DFV; 3.0 V8	G	Otto Stuppacher													DNS	DNQ	DNQ			71^{2}	3rd^{2}
1976	Heros Racing	Ford Cosworth DFV; 3.0 V8	B	Kazuyoshi Hoshino																Ret		71^{2}	3rd^{2}
1977	Meiritsu Racing Team	Ford Cosworth DFV; 3.0 V8	D		ARG	BRA	RSA	USW	ESP	MON	BEL	SWE	FRA	GBR	GER	AUT	NED	ITA	USA	CAN	JPN	27^{3}	5th^{3}
1977	Meiritsu Racing Team	Ford Cosworth DFV; 3.0 V8	D	Kunimitsu Takahashi																	9	27^{3}	5th^{3}

^1 4 points in 1974 scored using the Tyrrell 005.
^2 58 points in 1976 scored using the Tyrrell P34.
^3 All points in 1977 scored using the Tyrrell P34.

== Non-Championship results ==
(key) (results in italics indicate fastest lap)

Year	Entrants	Engines	Tyres	Drivers	1	2	3
1975	Elf Team Tyrrell	Ford Cosworth DFV 3.0 V8	G		ROC	INT	SUI
1975	Elf Team Tyrrell	Ford Cosworth DFV 3.0 V8	G	Jody Scheckter	Ret		
1975	Elf Team Tyrrell	Ford Cosworth DFV 3.0 V8	G	Patrick Depailler		5	2
1976	Elf Team Tyrrell	Ford Cosworth DFV 3.0 V8	G		ROC	INT	
1976	Elf Team Tyrrell	Ford Cosworth DFV 3.0 V8	G	Jody Scheckter	Ret	3	
