= Jac Nellemann =

Danish racing driver (born 1944)

- Born: 19 April 1944 (age 82); Copenhagen, Denmark

Formula One World Championship career
- Nationality: (Denmark) Danish
- Active years: 1976
- Team: RAM
- Entries: 1 (0 starts)
- Championships: 0
- Wins: 0
- Podiums: 0
- Career points: 0
- Pole positions: 0
- Fastest laps: 0
- First entry: 1976 Swedish Grand Prix

Championship titles
- 1966 1971 1973 1976, 1977 2002 2007: Danish Karting Championship; Danish Group 1 Championship; Danish Formula Ford Championship; Danish Formula 3 Championship; BRDC Sportscar Championship; Goodwood Revival Madgwick Cup

Jacob "Jac" Nellemann (Note: Sources disagree regarding the spelling of this person's surname. ChicaneF1, StatsF1, historicracing.com, racingsportscars.com and racing-reference spell it as "Nelleman" (i.e. with one 'n' at the end). However oldracingcars.com, ESPN, a contemporary race report in the Motor Sport Magazine and Mike Lang's Grand Prix! spell it as "Nellemann" (i.e. with two 'n's at the end) as do various other websites. His name also appears to have two 'n's as written on the side of his cars here and here, as well as on his helmet and on his racing suit.) (born 19 April 1944) is a Danish former racing driver. Reaching Formula One in 1976, his single entry was at the 1976 Swedish Grand Prix, driving Brabhams run by the small RAM team. Despite taking part in qualifying sessions in two cars, a BT42 and a BT44B, he failed to qualify. He was on the entry list for the following year's race, but he was not present for qualifying.

== Complete Formula One results ==
(key)

Year	Entrant	Chassis	Engine	1	2	3	4	5	6	7	8	9	10	11	12	13	14	15	16	WDC	Points
1976	RAM Racing	Brabham BT42 & BT44B	Cosworth V8	BRA	RSA	USW	ESP	BEL	MON	SWE; DNQ	FRA	GBR	GER	AUT	NED	ITA	CAN	USA	JPN	NC	0

== Footnotes ==
Sporting positions
Preceded by Ole Vejlund (1966)	Danish Formula Three Champion; 1976–1977	Succeeded by None
