= Alessandro Pesenti-Rossi =

Italian racing driver (1942–2026)

- Born: 31 August 1942; Bergamo, Lombardy, Italy
- Died: 21 February 2026 (aged 83); Val Brembilla, Lombardy, Italy

Formula One World Championship career
- Nationality: (Italy) Italian
- Active years: 1976
- Team: non-works Tyrrell
- Entries: 4 (3 starts)
- Championships: 0
- Wins: 0
- Podiums: 0
- Career points: 0
- Pole positions: 0
- Fastest laps: 0
- First entry: 1976 German Grand Prix
- Last entry: 1976 Italian Grand Prix

Alessandro Pesenti-Rossi (31 August 1942 – 21 February 2026) was an Italian racing driver. He participated in four Formula One World Championship Grands Prix in 1976 with a privately entered Tyrrell. He scored no championship points, but managed to finish every race that he started.

== Biography ==
Pesenti-Rossi was born in Bergamo on 31 August 1942. Before his brief time in Formula One, Pesenti-Rossi was a regular race winner in Italian Formula Three, where he won the 1972 Trofeo D'Estate (Summer Trophy), narrowly missing the 1975 title when the final race was abandoned due to rain as he was leading it. He lost the title to Luciano Pavesi by a single point.

After racing in Formula Two in two events in 1974, scoring points on both occasions, Pesenti-Rossi was hired by Bergamo-based Scuderia Rondini in 1975, finishing second at Mugello with a March 742. In 1977, Scuderia Rondini's owners, Francesco Randon and Giuseppe Zugan, decided to enter a Tyrrell car in Formula One with sponsorship by petrol company Gulf. The team was not successful, and Pesenti-Rossi returned to Formula Two with Alfa Romeo after his four Grands Prix.

Pesenti-Rossi died on 21 February 2026, at the age of 83.

== Racing record ==
=== Complete European Formula Two Championship results ===
(key) (Races in bold indicate pole position; races in italics indicate fastest lap)

Year	Entrant	Chassis	Engine	1	2	3	4	5	6	7	8	9	10	11	12	13	14	Pos.	Pts
1974	Equipe Nationale	March 732	BMW	BAR	HOC	PAU	SAL	HOC	MUG	KAR	PER	HOC; 6						20th	2
1974	Beta Racing Team	March 732	BMW										VAL; 7					20th	2
1975	Scuderia Citta del Mille	March 742	BMW	EST	THR	HOC; 7	NÜR	PAU	HOC	SAL	ROU							9th	13
1975	Scuderia Gulf Rondini	March 742	BMW									MUG; 2	PER; 6	SIL	ZOL	NOG; 5	VAL; 4	9th	13
1976	Scuderia Gulf Rondini	March 742	BMW	HOC; Ret														15th	2
1976	Scuderia Gulf Rondini	March 762	BMW		THR; DNQ	VAL; 5	SAL; 8	PAU; DNQ	HOC	ROU	MUG	PER	EST	NOG	HOC			15th	2
1977	AFMP Euroracing	March 772	BMW	SIL	THR; NC				PAU; Ret	MUG; 4	ROU; NC	NOG; Ret	PER; 11	MIS; 4	EST	DON		9th	13
1977	AFMP Euroracing	March 772	Hart			HOC; 4	NÜR; 17	VAL; 4										9th	13
1978	Trivellato Racing Team	Chevron B42	BMW	THR	HOC	NÜR	PAU	MUG	VAL	ROU	DON	NOG	PER	MIS	HOC; DNQ			NC	0

=== Complete Formula One results ===
(key)

Year	Entrant	Chassis	Engine	1	2	3	4	5	6	7	8	9	10	11	12	13	14	15	16	WDC	Pts
1976	Scuderia Gulf Rondini	Tyrrell 007	Ford Cosworth DFV 3.0 V8	BRA	RSA	USW	ESP	BEL	MON	SWE	FRA	GBR	GER; 14	AUT; 11	NED; DNQ	ITA; 18	CAN	USA	JPN	NC	0
