= Boro (Formula One) =

Dutch Formula One constructor

- Full name: HB Bewaking Alarm Systems
- Base: Bovenkerk, Netherlands
- Founder(s): Bob Hoogenboom; Rody Hoogenboom
- Noted drivers: (Australia) Larry Perkins (United Kingdom) Brian Henton

Formula One World Championship career
- First entry: 1976 Spanish Grand Prix
- Races entered: 8
- Engines: Ford
- Constructors' Championships: 0
- Drivers' Championships: 0
- Race victories: 0
- Pole positions: 0
- Fastest laps: 0
- Final entry: 1977 Italian Grand Prix

Boro was a Formula One team from the Netherlands run by the brothers Bob and Rody Hoogenboom.

Their single car was built by the Ensign team, but was renamed Boro after their main sponsor, HB Bewaking, ended up as proprietor of the car after a legal dispute with Ensign owner Morris Nunn. The name is a portmanteau of the Hoogenboom brothers' first names, BOb and ROdy.

In the Dutch village of Bovenkerk (North Holland), the Hoogenboom brothers set up a factory to work on the N175. They entered a total of eight Grands Prix between 1976 and 1977, but failed to make a lasting impression. The team achieved finishes in only two events, the best being eighth place for Larry Perkins in the 1976 Belgian Grand Prix.

== Complete Formula One World Championship results ==
(key)

Year	Chassis	Engine(s)	Tyres	Drivers	1	2	3	4	5	6	7	8	9	10	11	12	13	14	15	16	17	Points	WCC
1976	Boro 001	Ford Cosworth DFV	G		BRA	RSA	USW	ESP	BEL	MON	SWE	FRA	GBR	GER	AUT	NED	ITA	CAN	USA	JPN		0	NC
1976	Boro 001	Ford Cosworth DFV	G	(Australia) Larry Perkins				13	8	DNQ	Ret					Ret	Ret					0	NC
1977	Boro 001	Ford Cosworth DFV	G		ARG	BRA	RSA	USW	ESP	MON	BEL	SWE	FRA	GBR	GER	AUT	NED	ITA	USA	CAN	JPN	0	NC
1977	Boro 001	Ford Cosworth DFV	G	(United Kingdom) Brian Henton													DSQ	DNQ				0	NC
