= Otto Stuppacher =

Austrian racing driver (1947–2001)

- Stuppacher at the 1976 Italian Grand Prix
- Born: 3 March 1947
- Died: 13 August 2001 (aged 54)

Formula One World Championship career
- Nationality: (Austria) Austrian
- Active years: 1976
- Team: non-works Tyrrell
- Entries: 3 (0 starts)
- Championships: 0
- Wins: 0
- Podiums: 0
- Career points: 0
- Pole positions: 0
- Fastest laps: 0
- First entry: 1976 Italian Grand Prix
- Last entry: 1976 United States Grand Prix

Championship titles
- 1971 1976: Austrian Mountain Championship; Preis der Elektro-Diesel-Bosch

Otto Leopold Stuppacher (3 March 1947 – 15 August 2001) was a racing driver from Vienna, Austria. He competed in hill-climbs and sports car racing before entering 3 Formula One Grands Prix with the ÖASC Racing Team in 1976, with a Tyrrell 007. He was refused entry to the 1976 Austrian Grand Prix, along with teammate Karl Oppitzhauser, despite trying to raise a petition from the other teams.

== Formula One career ==
At the 1976 Italian Grand Prix, Stuppacher failed to qualify by a considerable margin, but subsequently he was promoted up the order when three other cars had their times disallowed due to fuel irregularities. Unfortunately, Stuppacher had already left the circuit and returned home, and was unable to get back to the circuit in time to race. The three demoted runners were eventually re-admitted after the withdrawal of Stuppacher, Arturo Merzario, and Guy Edwards.

Stuppacher failed to qualify at his other two attempts in 1976, the 1976 Canadian Grand Prix and the 1976 USA East Grand Prix, the latter seeing him over 27 seconds off the time of pole-sitter James Hunt. To date, this gap between pole-position time and slowest time during qualifying in an official Formula One race is a record that still stands today.

It is not clear how much racing Stuppacher did after 1976, and very little is known about him until he was found dead in his Vienna flat in 2001.

Stuppacher had a sister who raced in harness racing as Elisabeth Stuppacher, who was the Austrian champion from 1993 to 2000. Their mother Helene Musa was notable in Austrian harness racing circles.

== Complete Formula One World Championship results ==
(key)

| Year | Entrant | Chassis | Engine | 1 | 2 | 3 | 4 | 5 | 6 | 7 | 8 | 9 | 10 | 11 | 12 | 13 | 14 | 15 | 16 | WDC | Points |
|---|---|---|---|---|---|---|---|---|---|---|---|---|---|---|---|---|---|---|---|---|---|
| 1976 | ÖASC Racing Team | Tyrrell 007 | Cosworth V8 | BRA | RSA | USW | ESP | BEL | MON | SWE | FRA | GBR | GER | AUT | NED | ITA; DNS | CAN; DNQ | USA; DNQ | JPN | NC | 0 |
