= 1976 Formula One season =

30th season of FIA Formula One motor racing

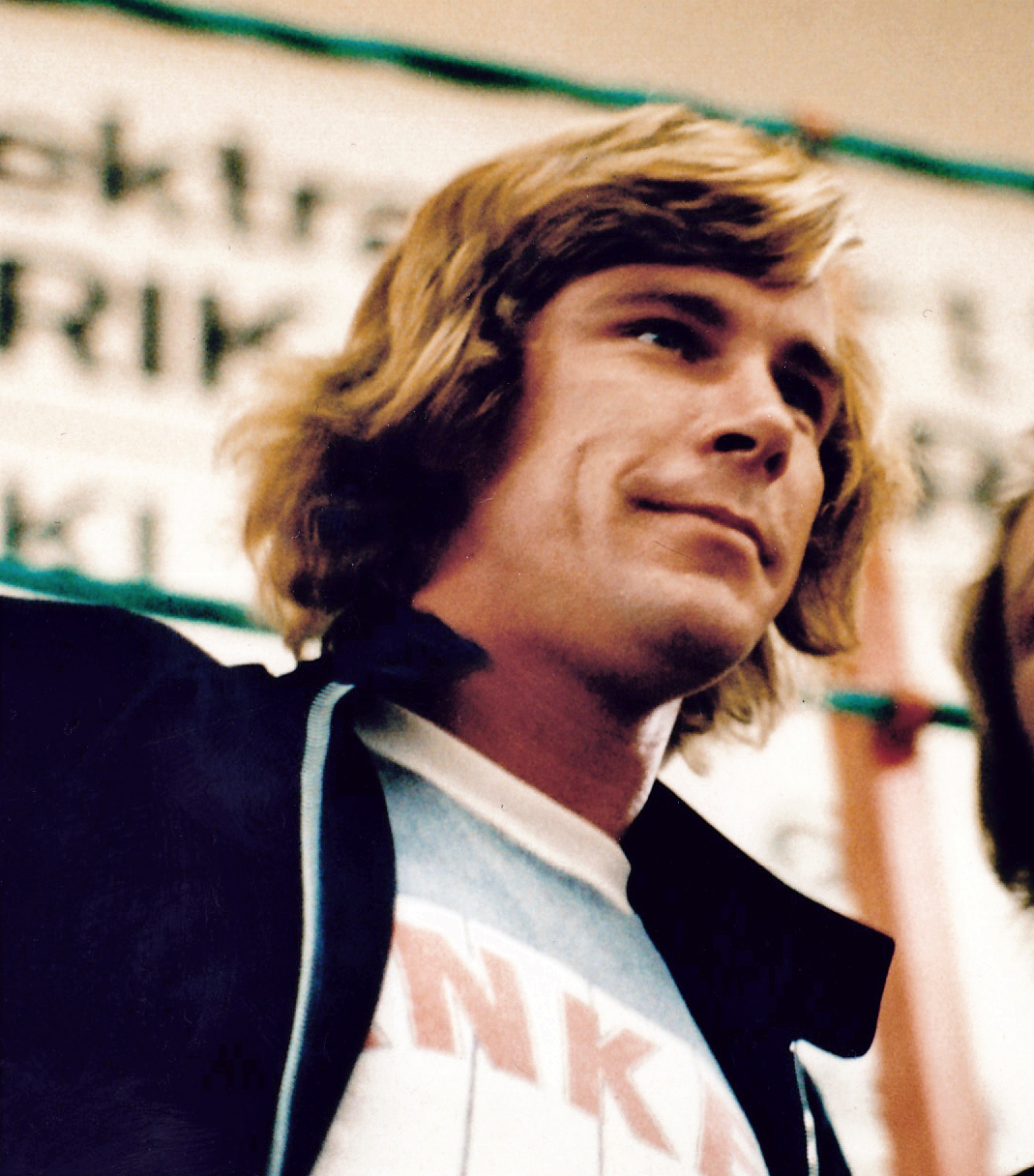
James Hunt (pictured in 1977) won his first and only World Championship of Drivers driving for McLaren-Ford.

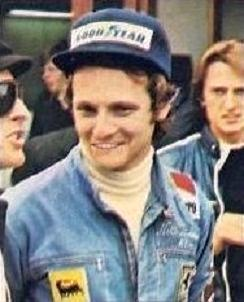
Defending Champion Niki Lauda (pictured in 1974) was runner up by one point, driving for Ferrari.

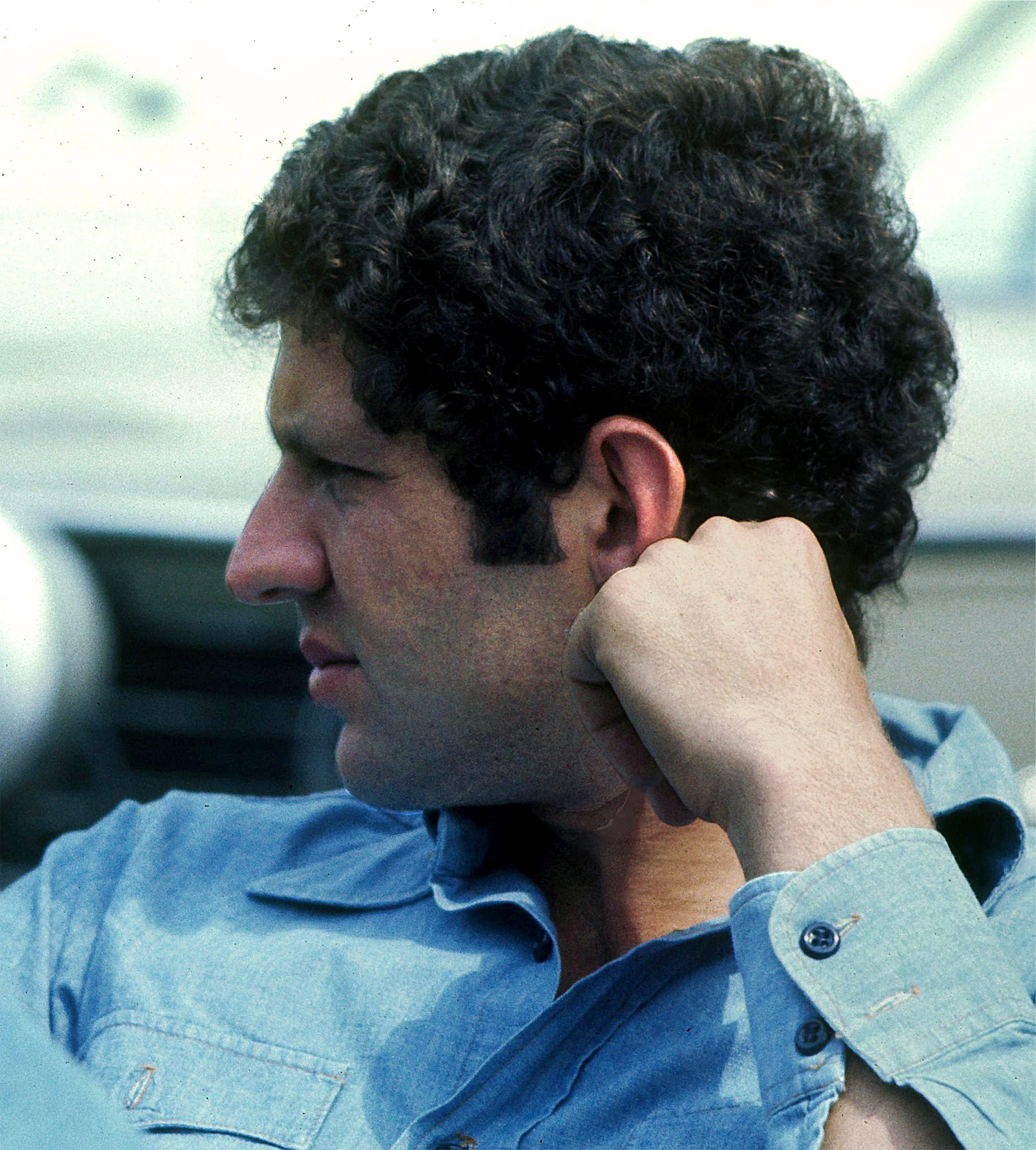
Jody Scheckter finished third, driving for Tyrrell-Ford.

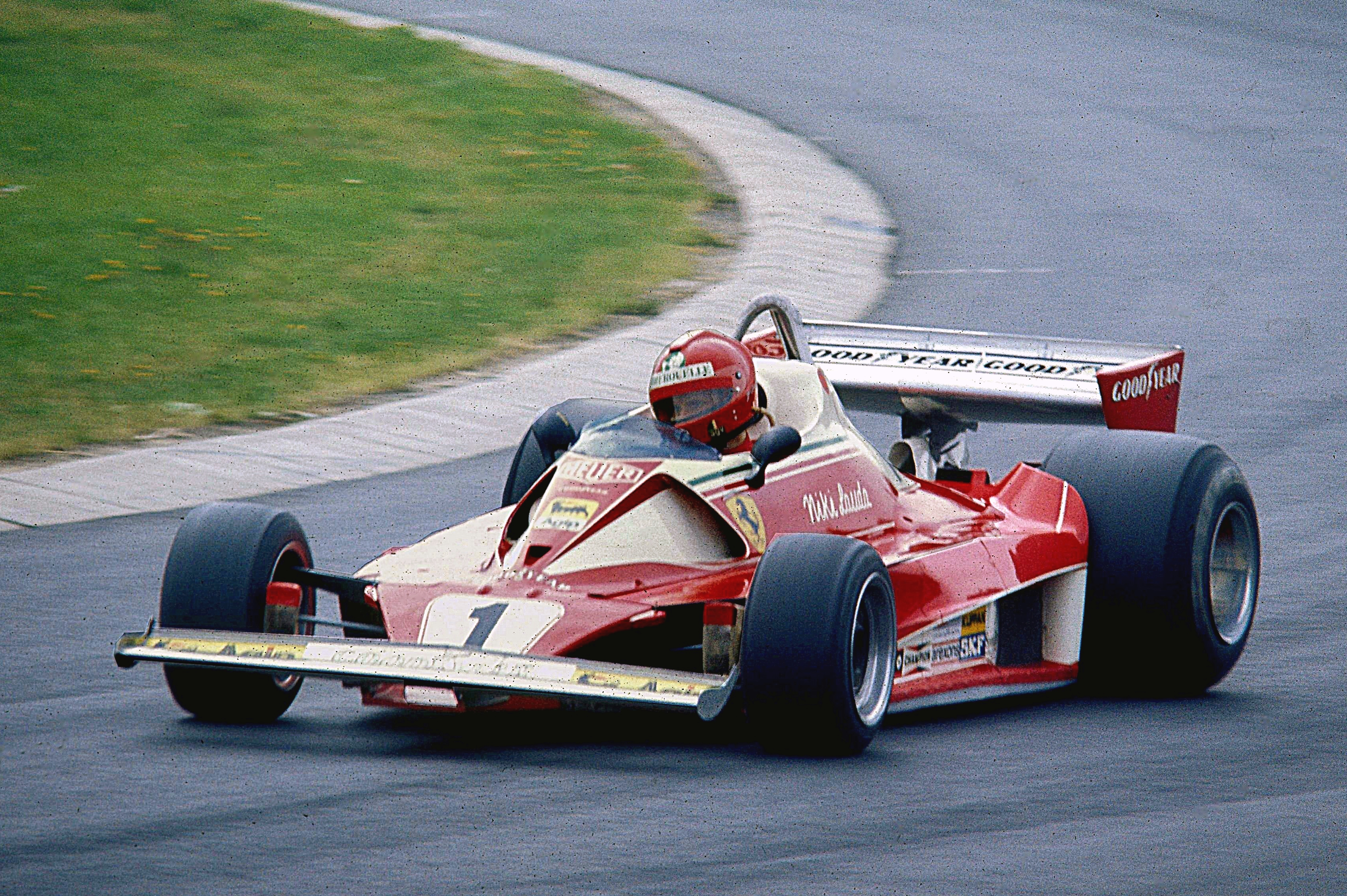
Ferrari successfully defended their International Cup for F1 Manufacturers' title.

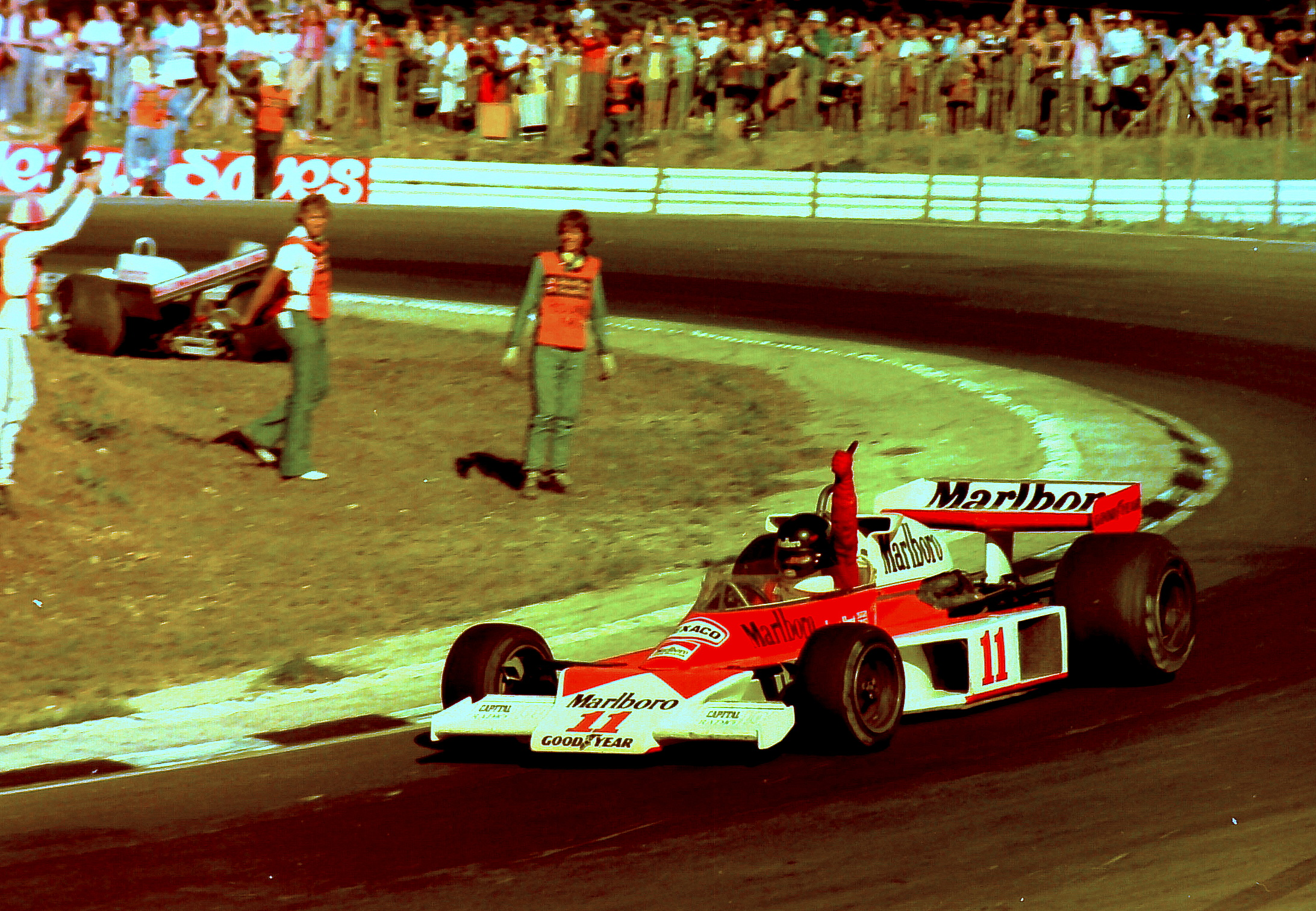
McLaren finished second in the Manufacturers' Championship.

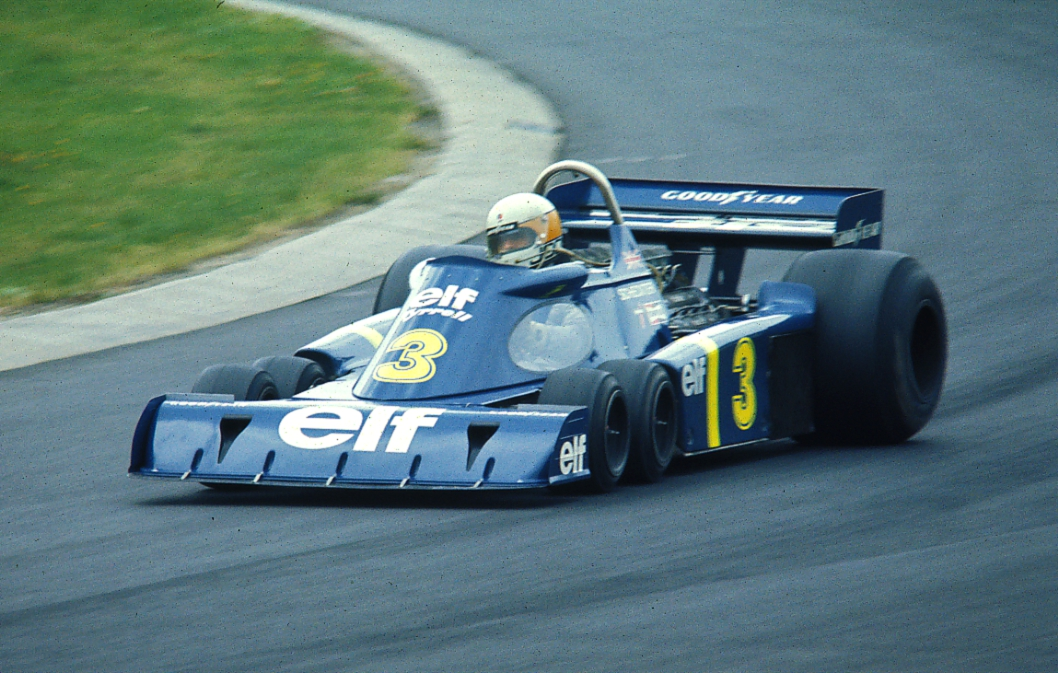
Tyrrell finished third in the Manufacturers' Championship.

The 1976 Formula One season was the 30th season of FIA Formula One motor racing. It featured the 1976 World Championship of Drivers and the 1976 International Cup for Formula 1 Manufacturers. The two titles were contested over a 16-race series that began on 25 January and ended on 24 October. Two non-championship races were also held during the season. In an extraordinarily political and dramatic season, the Drivers' Championship went to McLaren driver James Hunt by one point from Ferrari's defending champion Niki Lauda, although Ferrari took the Manufacturers' trophy.

The controversy began in Spain, where Hunt was initially disqualified from first place, handing the victory to Lauda, only for the decision to be overturned on appeal months later. In protest, Ferrari declined to enter the Austrian Grand Prix. Hunt won in France and, it seemed, in Britain, but the race had been restarted after a first lap pile-up and Hunt drove on an access road returning to the pits, which was against the rules. He was eventually disqualified after an appeal from Ferrari. Lauda became the official race winner.

Lauda had a massive crash at the Nürburgring in West Germany and appeared likely to die from his injuries, but managed to return after missing just two races. Going into the final race in Japan, Lauda led Hunt by three points. In the appalling weather conditions, Lauda withdrew from the race and Hunt finished third to take the championship trophy. This was the last championship for a British driver until Nigel Mansell in 1992. The 2013 film Rush is based on this season, focusing on the rivalry and friendship between Hunt and Lauda.

Other noteworthy events include the introduction of the six-wheeled Tyrrell P34, the last race by Chris Amon, regarded as one of the best F1 drivers never to win a championship, and the British Grand Prix, for being the only championship race ever in which more than one female driver were entered, although both failed to qualify.

== Teams and drivers ==
The following teams and drivers contested the 1976 World Championship of Drivers and the 1976 International Cup for Formula 1 Manufacturers.

Entrant	Constructor	Chassis	Engine	Tyre	No	Driver	Rounds
(Italy) Scuderia Ferrari	Ferrari	312T; 312T2	Ferrari 015 3.0 F12	G	1	(Austria) Niki Lauda	1–10, 13–16
(Italy) Scuderia Ferrari	Ferrari	312T; 312T2	Ferrari 015 3.0 F12	G	2	(Switzerland) Clay Regazzoni	1–10, 12–16
(Italy) Scuderia Ferrari	Ferrari	312T; 312T2	Ferrari 015 3.0 F12	G	35	(Argentina) Carlos Reutemann	13
(United Kingdom) Elf Team Tyrrell	Tyrrell-Ford	007; P34	Ford Cosworth DFV 3.0 V8	G	3	(South Africa) Jody Scheckter	All
(United Kingdom) Elf Team Tyrrell	Tyrrell-Ford	007; P34	Ford Cosworth DFV 3.0 V8	G	4	(France) Patrick Depailler	All
(United Kingdom) John Player Team Lotus	Lotus-Ford	77	Ford Cosworth DFV 3.0 V8	G	5	(Sweden) Ronnie Peterson	1
(United Kingdom) John Player Team Lotus	Lotus-Ford	77	Ford Cosworth DFV 3.0 V8	G	5	(United Kingdom) Bob Evans	2–3
(United Kingdom) John Player Team Lotus	Lotus-Ford	77	Ford Cosworth DFV 3.0 V8	G	5	(United States) Mario Andretti	4–5, 7–16
(United Kingdom) John Player Team Lotus	Lotus-Ford	77	Ford Cosworth DFV 3.0 V8	G	6	(United States) Mario Andretti	1
(United Kingdom) John Player Team Lotus	Lotus-Ford	77	Ford Cosworth DFV 3.0 V8	G	6	(Sweden) Gunnar Nilsson	2–16
(United Kingdom) Martini Racing	Brabham-Alfa Romeo	BT45	Alfa Romeo 115-12 3.0 F12	G	7	(Argentina) Carlos Reutemann	1–12
(United Kingdom) Martini Racing	Brabham-Alfa Romeo	BT45	Alfa Romeo 115-12 3.0 F12	G	7	(West Germany) Rolf Stommelen	13
(United Kingdom) Martini Racing	Brabham-Alfa Romeo	BT45	Alfa Romeo 115-12 3.0 F12	G	7	(Australia) Larry Perkins	14–16
(United Kingdom) Martini Racing	Brabham-Alfa Romeo	BT45	Alfa Romeo 115-12 3.0 F12	G	8	(Brazil) Carlos Pace	All
(United Kingdom) Martini Racing	Brabham-Alfa Romeo	BT45	Alfa Romeo 115-12 3.0 F12	G	77	(West Germany) Rolf Stommelen	10
(United Kingdom) Beta Team March (United Kingdom) Lavazza March (United Kingdom) March Racing (United Kingdom) Theodore Racing (United Kingdom) Ovoro Team March (United Kingdom) March Engineering	March-Ford	761	Ford Cosworth DFV 3.0 V8	G	9	(Italy) Vittorio Brambilla	All
(United Kingdom) Beta Team March (United Kingdom) Lavazza March (United Kingdom) March Racing (United Kingdom) Theodore Racing (United Kingdom) Ovoro Team March (United Kingdom) March Engineering	March-Ford	761	Ford Cosworth DFV 3.0 V8	G	10	(Italy) Lella Lombardi	1
(United Kingdom) Beta Team March (United Kingdom) Lavazza March (United Kingdom) March Racing (United Kingdom) Theodore Racing (United Kingdom) Ovoro Team March (United Kingdom) March Engineering	March-Ford	761	Ford Cosworth DFV 3.0 V8	G	10	(Sweden) Ronnie Peterson	2–16
(United Kingdom) Beta Team March (United Kingdom) Lavazza March (United Kingdom) March Racing (United Kingdom) Theodore Racing (United Kingdom) Ovoro Team March (United Kingdom) March Engineering	March-Ford	761	Ford Cosworth DFV 3.0 V8	G	34	(West Germany) Hans-Joachim Stuck	All
(United Kingdom) Beta Team March (United Kingdom) Lavazza March (United Kingdom) March Racing (United Kingdom) Theodore Racing (United Kingdom) Ovoro Team March (United Kingdom) March Engineering	March-Ford	761	Ford Cosworth DFV 3.0 V8	G	35	(Italy) Arturo Merzario	3–9
(United Kingdom) Marlboro Team McLaren	McLaren-Ford	M23D; M26	Ford Cosworth DFV 3.0 V8	G	11	(United Kingdom) James Hunt	All
(United Kingdom) Marlboro Team McLaren	McLaren-Ford	M23D; M26	Ford Cosworth DFV 3.0 V8	G	12	(West Germany) Jochen Mass	All
(United Kingdom) ShellSport Whiting	Surtees-Ford	TS16	Ford Cosworth DFV 3.0 V8	G	13	(United Kingdom) Divina Galica	9
(United Kingdom) Stanley-BRM	BRM	P201B	BRM P200 3.0 V12	G	14	(United Kingdom) Ian Ashley	1
(South Africa) Lexington Racing	Tyrrell-Ford	007	Ford Cosworth DFV 3.0 V8	G	15	(South Africa) Ian Scheckter	2
(United Kingdom) Shadow Racing Team (United Kingdom) Lucky Strike Shadow Racing (United Kingdom) Tabatip Shadow Racing (United Kingdom) Benihana Shadow Racing	Shadow-Ford	DN5B; DN8	Ford Cosworth DFV 3.0 V8	G	16	(United Kingdom) Tom Pryce	All
(United Kingdom) Shadow Racing Team (United Kingdom) Lucky Strike Shadow Racing (United Kingdom) Tabatip Shadow Racing (United Kingdom) Benihana Shadow Racing	Shadow-Ford	DN5B; DN8	Ford Cosworth DFV 3.0 V8	G	17	(France) Jean-Pierre Jarier	All
(United Kingdom) Chesterfield Team Surtees (United Kingdom) Team Surtees (United Kingdom) Durex Team Surtees (United Kingdom) Durex Team Surtees / Theodore Racing	Surtees-Ford	TS19	Ford Cosworth DFV 3.0 V8	G	18	(United States) Brett Lunger	2–5, 7–11, 13–15
(United Kingdom) Chesterfield Team Surtees (United Kingdom) Team Surtees (United Kingdom) Durex Team Surtees (United Kingdom) Durex Team Surtees / Theodore Racing	Surtees-Ford	TS19	Ford Cosworth DFV 3.0 V8	G	18	(Sweden) Conny Andersson	12
(United Kingdom) Chesterfield Team Surtees (United Kingdom) Team Surtees (United Kingdom) Durex Team Surtees (United Kingdom) Durex Team Surtees / Theodore Racing	Surtees-Ford	TS19	Ford Cosworth DFV 3.0 V8	G	18	(Japan) Noritake Takahara	16
(United Kingdom) Chesterfield Team Surtees (United Kingdom) Team Surtees (United Kingdom) Durex Team Surtees (United Kingdom) Durex Team Surtees / Theodore Racing	Surtees-Ford	TS19	Ford Cosworth DFV 3.0 V8	G	19	(Australia) Alan Jones	3–16
(United Kingdom) Frank Williams Racing Cars (Canada) Walter Wolf Racing	Wolf-Williams-Ford	FW04; FW05	Ford Cosworth DFV 3.0 V8	G	20	(Belgium) Jacky Ickx	1–6, 8–9
(United Kingdom) Frank Williams Racing Cars (Canada) Walter Wolf Racing	Wolf-Williams-Ford	FW04; FW05	Ford Cosworth DFV 3.0 V8	G	20	(Italy) Arturo Merzario	10–16
(United Kingdom) Frank Williams Racing Cars (Canada) Walter Wolf Racing	Wolf-Williams-Ford	FW04; FW05	Ford Cosworth DFV 3.0 V8	G	21	(Italy) Renzo Zorzi	1
(United Kingdom) Frank Williams Racing Cars (Canada) Walter Wolf Racing	Wolf-Williams-Ford	FW04; FW05	Ford Cosworth DFV 3.0 V8	G	21	(France) Michel Leclère	2–8
(United Kingdom) Frank Williams Racing Cars (Canada) Walter Wolf Racing	Wolf-Williams-Ford	FW04; FW05	Ford Cosworth DFV 3.0 V8	G	21	(New Zealand) Chris Amon	14
(United Kingdom) Frank Williams Racing Cars (Canada) Walter Wolf Racing	Wolf-Williams-Ford	FW04; FW05	Ford Cosworth DFV 3.0 V8	G	21	(Australia) Warwick Brown	15
(United Kingdom) Frank Williams Racing Cars (Canada) Walter Wolf Racing	Wolf-Williams-Ford	FW04; FW05	Ford Cosworth DFV 3.0 V8	G	21	(Austria) Hans Binder	16
(United Kingdom) Frank Williams Racing Cars (Canada) Walter Wolf Racing	Wolf-Williams-Ford	FW04; FW05	Ford Cosworth DFV 3.0 V8	G	21	(Japan) Masami Kuwashima	16
(United Kingdom) Team Ensign (United Kingdom) Team Tissot Ensign	Ensign-Ford	N174; N176	Ford Cosworth DFV 3.0 V8	G	22	(New Zealand) Chris Amon	2–7, 9–10
(United Kingdom) Team Ensign (United Kingdom) Team Tissot Ensign	Ensign-Ford	N174; N176	Ford Cosworth DFV 3.0 V8	G	22	(Belgium) Patrick Nève	8
(United Kingdom) Team Ensign (United Kingdom) Team Tissot Ensign	Ensign-Ford	N174; N176	Ford Cosworth DFV 3.0 V8	G	22	(Austria) Hans Binder	11
(United Kingdom) Team Ensign (United Kingdom) Team Tissot Ensign	Ensign-Ford	N174; N176	Ford Cosworth DFV 3.0 V8	G	22	(Belgium) Jacky Ickx	12–15
(United Kingdom) Hesketh Racing (United Kingdom) Penthouse Rizla+. Racing with Hesketh	Hesketh-Ford	308D	Ford Cosworth DFV 3.0 V8	G	24	(Austria) Harald Ertl	2–16
(United Kingdom) Hesketh Racing (United Kingdom) Penthouse Rizla+. Racing with Hesketh	Hesketh-Ford	308D	Ford Cosworth DFV 3.0 V8	G	25	(United Kingdom) Guy Edwards	5, 8–10, 13–14
(United Kingdom) Hesketh Racing (United Kingdom) Penthouse Rizla+. Racing with Hesketh	Hesketh-Ford	308D	Ford Cosworth DFV 3.0 V8	G	25	(West Germany) Rolf Stommelen	12
(United Kingdom) Hesketh Racing (United Kingdom) Penthouse Rizla+. Racing with Hesketh	Hesketh-Ford	308D	Ford Cosworth DFV 3.0 V8	G	25	(Brazil) Alex Ribeiro	15
(United Kingdom) Mapfre-Williams	Williams-Ford	FW04	Ford Cosworth DFV 3.0 V8	G	25	(Spain) Emilio Zapico	4
(France) Ligier Gitanes	Ligier-Matra	JS5	Matra MS73 3.0 V12	G	26	(France) Jacques Laffite	All
(United States) Vel's Parnelli Jones Racing	Parnelli-Ford	VPJ4B	Ford Cosworth DFV 3.0 V8	G	27	(United States) Mario Andretti	2–3
(Netherlands) Boro Racing	Boro-Ford	001	Ford Cosworth DFV 3.0 V8	G	27	(Australia) Larry Perkins	12
(Netherlands) Boro Racing	Boro-Ford	001	Ford Cosworth DFV 3.0 V8	G	37	(Australia) Larry Perkins	4–7
(Netherlands) Boro Racing	Boro-Ford	001	Ford Cosworth DFV 3.0 V8	G	40	(Australia) Larry Perkins	13
(United States) First National City Bank Team Penske	Penske-Ford	PC3; PC4	Ford Cosworth DFV 3.0 V8	G	28	(United Kingdom) John Watson	All
(Brazil) Copersucar Fittipaldi	Fittipaldi-Ford	FD03; FD04	Ford Cosworth DFV 3.0 V8	G	30	(Brazil) Emerson Fittipaldi	All
(Brazil) Copersucar Fittipaldi	Fittipaldi-Ford	FD03; FD04	Ford Cosworth DFV 3.0 V8	G	31	(Brazil) Ingo Hoffmann	1, 3–4, 8
(United Kingdom) RAM Racing (United Kingdom) RAM Racing with Lavazza	Brabham-Ford	BT44B	Ford Cosworth DFV 3.0 V8	G	32	(Switzerland) Loris Kessel	4–5, 7–8, 11
(United Kingdom) RAM Racing (United Kingdom) RAM Racing with Lavazza	Brabham-Ford	BT44B	Ford Cosworth DFV 3.0 V8	G	32	(United Kingdom) Bob Evans	9
(United Kingdom) RAM Racing (United Kingdom) RAM Racing with Lavazza	Brabham-Ford	BT44B	Ford Cosworth DFV 3.0 V8	G	33	(Spain) Emilio de Villota	4
(United Kingdom) RAM Racing (United Kingdom) RAM Racing with Lavazza	Brabham-Ford	BT44B	Ford Cosworth DFV 3.0 V8	G	33	(Belgium) Patrick Nève	5
(United Kingdom) RAM Racing (United Kingdom) RAM Racing with Lavazza	Brabham-Ford	BT44B	Ford Cosworth DFV 3.0 V8	G	33	(Denmark) Jac Nellemann	7
(United Kingdom) RAM Racing (United Kingdom) RAM Racing with Lavazza	Brabham-Ford	BT44B	Ford Cosworth DFV 3.0 V8	G	33	(United Kingdom) Damien Magee	8
(United Kingdom) RAM Racing (United Kingdom) RAM Racing with Lavazza	Brabham-Ford	BT44B	Ford Cosworth DFV 3.0 V8	G	33	(Italy) Lella Lombardi	9, 11
(United Kingdom) RAM Racing (United Kingdom) RAM Racing with Lavazza	Brabham-Ford	BT44B	Ford Cosworth DFV 3.0 V8	G	36	(West Germany) Rolf Stommelen (Note: Stommelen was originally entered in a RAM Racing Brabham BT44B but after the team's cars were impounded by the police, he was transferred into the spare factory Brabham BT45.)	10
(United Kingdom) RAM Racing (United Kingdom) RAM Racing with Lavazza	Brabham-Ford	BT44B	Ford Cosworth DFV 3.0 V8	G	37	(Italy) Lella Lombardi	10
(Italy) Scuderia Gulf Rondini	Tyrrell-Ford	007	Ford Cosworth DFV 3.0 V8	G	37	(Italy) Alessandro Pesenti-Rossi	13
(Italy) Scuderia Gulf Rondini	Tyrrell-Ford	007	Ford Cosworth DFV 3.0 V8	G	39	(Italy) Alessandro Pesenti-Rossi	11
(Italy) Scuderia Gulf Rondini	Tyrrell-Ford	007	Ford Cosworth DFV 3.0 V8	G	40	(Italy) Alessandro Pesenti-Rossi	10, 12
(United Kingdom) Team Norev	Surtees-Ford	TS19	Ford Cosworth DFV 3.0 V8	G	38	(France) Henri Pescarolo	6, 8–15
(Netherlands) F&S Properties	Penske-Ford	PC3	Ford Cosworth DFV 3.0 V8	G	39	(Netherlands) Boy Hayje	12
(Austria) ÖASC Racing Team	Tyrrell-Ford	007	Ford Cosworth DFV 3.0 V8	G	39	(Austria) Otto Stuppacher	13–15
(United Kingdom) Team P R Reilly	Shadow-Ford	DN3B	Ford Cosworth DFV 3.0 V8	G	40	(United Kingdom) Mike Wilds	9
(Japan) Kojima Engineering	Kojima-Ford	KE007	Ford Cosworth DFV 3.0 V8	D	51	(Japan) Masahiro Hasemi	16
(Japan) Heros Racing	Tyrrell-Ford	007	Ford Cosworth DFV 3.0 V8	B	52	(Japan) Kazuyoshi Hoshino	16
(Japan) Maki Engineering	Maki-Ford	F102A	Ford Cosworth DFV 3.0 V8	D	54	(United Kingdom) Tony Trimmer	16

=== Team and driver changes ===
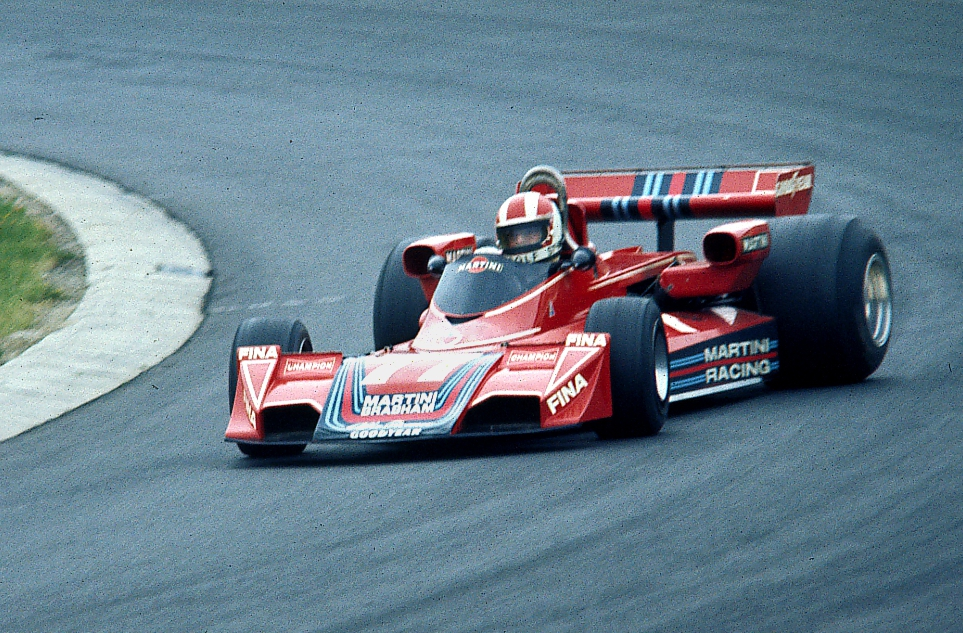
After taking on Alfa Romeo engines, the Brabhams were painted rosso corsa red.

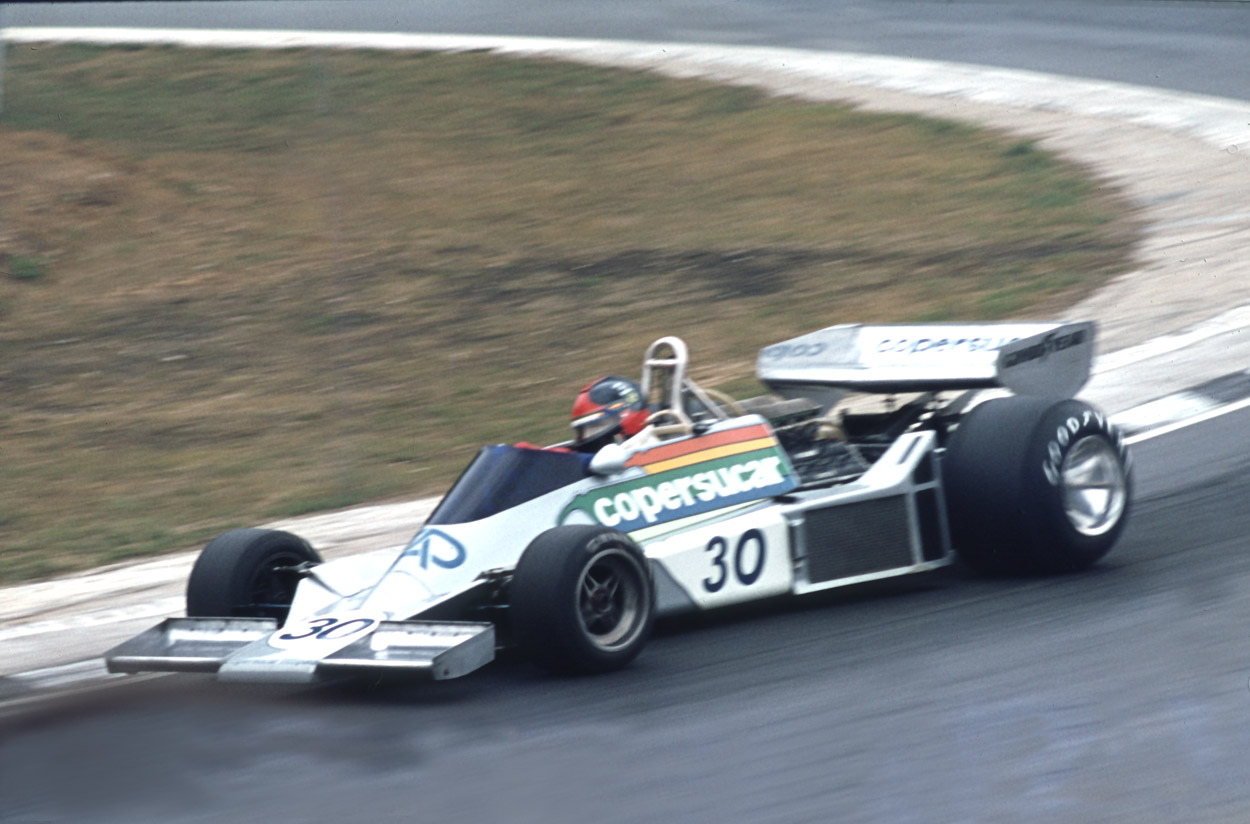
Emerson Fittipaldi drove for his brother's team.

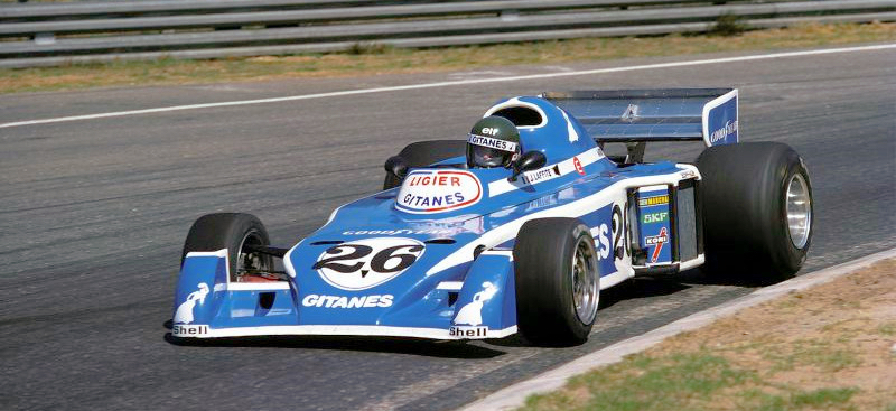
The Ligier team with Matra engine and Jacques Laffite as driver would go on to become the first all-French F1 team to win a Grand Prix.

- Despite the success of Gordon Murray's Cosworth-powered cars, Bernie Ecclestone signed a deal with Italian motor manufacturer Alfa Romeo to use their large and powerful flat-12 engine. The engines were supplied for free, but they rendered the new BT45s, now in red Martini Racing livery, unreliable and overweight.
- 1974 champion Emerson Fittipaldi moved to his brother Wilson's team Fittipaldi Automotive, with Wilson taking on the role of manager instead of driver. Emerson's seat at McLaren was given to James Hunt.
- The Shadow team which had entered into Formula One in the 1973 season under an American licence received a British licence, thus becoming the first team to officially change its nationality.
- After the departure of Matra at the end of the 1972 season, no French constructor competed in Formula One for three seasons until Ligier's arrival at the start of this season. Guy Ligier, owner of various sports car operations, decided to buy Matra's assets and start a Formula 1 team. He hired Jacques Laffite from Williams.
- After a dismal 1975 season with Lotus, Jacky Ickx moved to the newly formed Wolf-Williams Racing. Mario Andretti drove for Lotus in the opening race of the season and then acquired a permanent contract after his employer, the Parnelli team, folded.
- John Watson had moved from Surtees to Penske Racing at the end of 1975, and drove for them the whole 1976 season.
- BRM continued to decline, both in results and in operation size, only entering the first race of the 1976 season.
- Embassy Hill was scheduled to have entered a full season with Tony Brise but they pulled out following the Embassy Hill plane crash in November 1975 which killed all six members on the plane including Brise and team owner Graham Hill.

==== Mid-season changes ====
- At the end of 1975, Ronnie Peterson was convinced by Colin Chapman to stay with Lotus, but after just one race into the 1976 season, the Swede joined March in favour of female driver Lella Lombardi. Fellow Swede Gunnar Nilsson, signed by March, was loaned to Lotus.
- Niki Lauda was seriously injured in a crash at the German Grand Prix at the Nürburgring. His Ferrari burst into flames, nearly killing him after he inhaled hot toxic fumes and suffered severe burns. Carlos Reutemann negotiated a release from his Brabham contract to act as a replacement to Lauda. This would only lead to one drive, but the Argentinian was offered to a full-season drive in 1977. Reutemann's seat at Brabham was taken up by Rolf Stommelen and then Boro's Larry Perkins.
- After seeing Lauda's crash, Chris Amon promptly retired from Formula 1, until the Wolf-Williams team persuaded him to return. However, after a heavy collision with another car during qualifying for the Canadian Grand Prix, he walked away unharmed and hung up his helmet for good. Jacky Ickx finished the season with Amon's former employer Ensign, while Wolf-Williams hired Arturo Merzario from the March team.

== Calendar ==
The Drivers and Manufacturers titles were contested over sixteen races.

Round	Grand Prix	Circuit	Date
1	Brazilian Grand Prix	(Brazil) Autodromo de Interlagos, São Paulo	25 January
2	South African Grand Prix	(South Africa) Kyalami Grand Prix Circuit, Midrand	6 March
3	United States Grand Prix West	(United States) Long Beach Street Circuit, Los Angeles, California	28 March
4	Spanish Grand Prix	(Spain) Circuito Permanente del Jarama, Madrid	2 May
5	Belgian Grand Prix	(Belgium) Circuit Zolder, Heusden-Zolder	16 May
6	Monaco Grand Prix	Circuit de Monaco, Monte Carlo	30 May
7	Swedish Grand Prix	(Sweden) Scandinavian Raceway, Anderstorp	13 June
8	French Grand Prix	(France) Circuit Paul Ricard, Le Castellet	4 July
9	British Grand Prix	(United Kingdom) Brands Hatch, Kent	18 July
10	German Grand Prix	(West Germany) Nürburgring, Nürburg	1 August
11	Austrian Grand Prix	(Austria) Österreichring, Spielberg	15 August
12	Dutch Grand Prix	(Netherlands) Circuit Park Zandvoort, Zandvoort	29 August
13	Italian Grand Prix	(Italy) Autodromo Nazionale di Monza, Monza	12 September
14	Canadian Grand Prix	(Canada) Mosport Park, Bowmanville, Ontario	3 October
15	United States Grand Prix	(United States) Watkins Glen Grand Prix Course, New York	10 October
16	Japanese Grand Prix	(Japan) Fuji Speedway, Oyama, Shizuoka	24 October

=== Calendar changes ===
- The Argentine Grand Prix at Buenos Aires was originally scheduled as the first round of the season on 11 January, but was cancelled, largely due to economic and political concerns.
- The United States Grand Prix West hosted its first Grand Prix. The race was held on a street circuit in Long Beach near Los Angeles on 28 March.
- The Spanish Grand Prix was moved permanently to Jarama near Madrid. This was done in reaction to the accident in the 1975 race in Montjuïc, in which five spectators were killed.
- The Belgian Grand Prix and Monaco Grand Prix swapped places on the calendar so that the Monaco came second this time. Nivelles-Baulers in Brussels was due to host the Belgian Grand Prix in rotation with Circuit Zolder, but the track surface at Nivelles had deteriorated and Zolder took over the slot.
- The British Grand Prix was moved from Silverstone to Brands Hatch, in keeping with the event-sharing arrangement between the two circuits.
- The Dutch Grand Prix was moved from mid June to late August.
- The Canadian Grand Prix returned to the calendar, after it was cancelled in 1975 due to a dispute between two rival breweries and event sponsors, Labatt and Molson.
- The Japanese Grand Prix hosted its first Grand Prix with a three-year contract. The race was held at Fuji Speedway on 24 October.

== Regulation changes ==
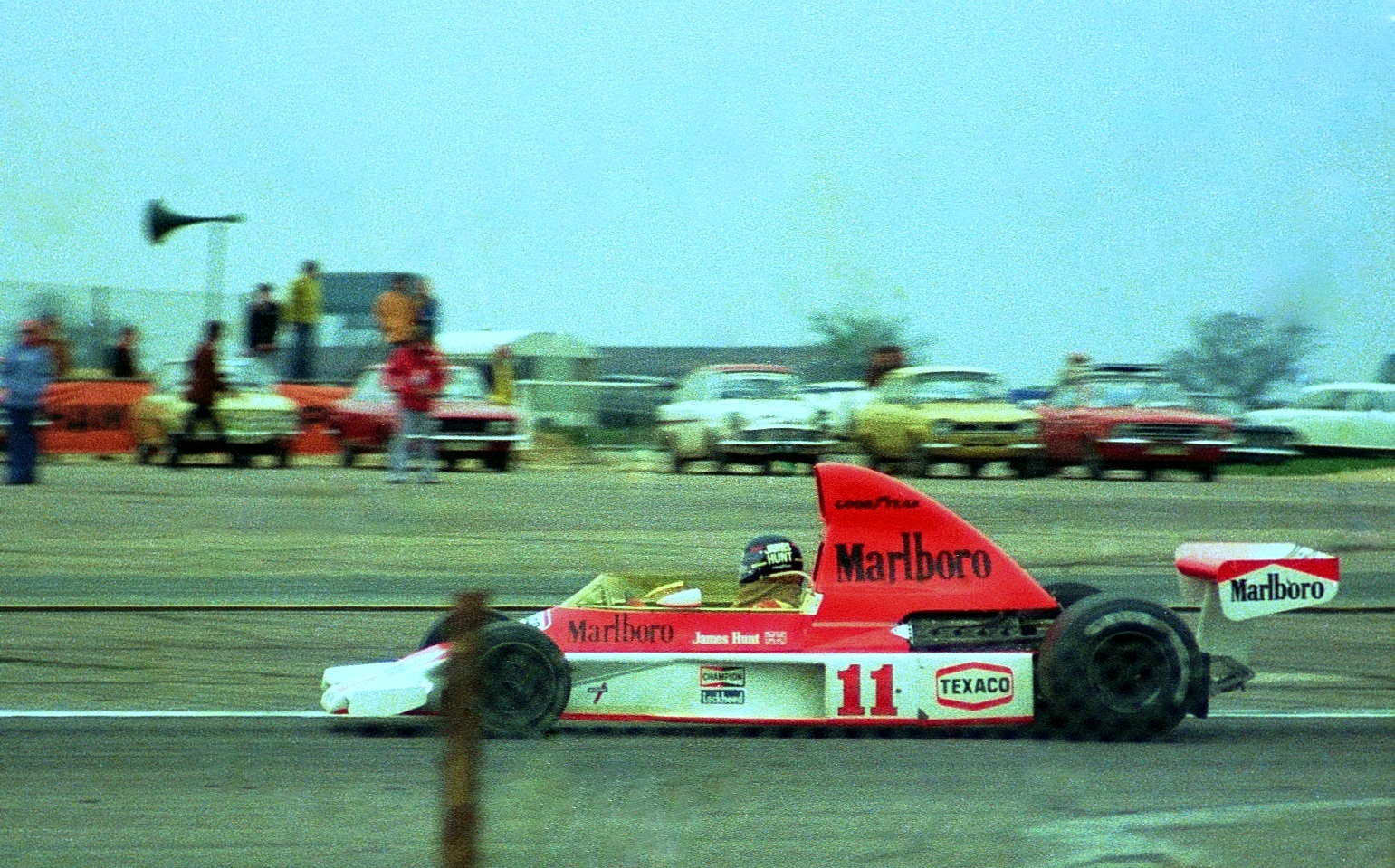
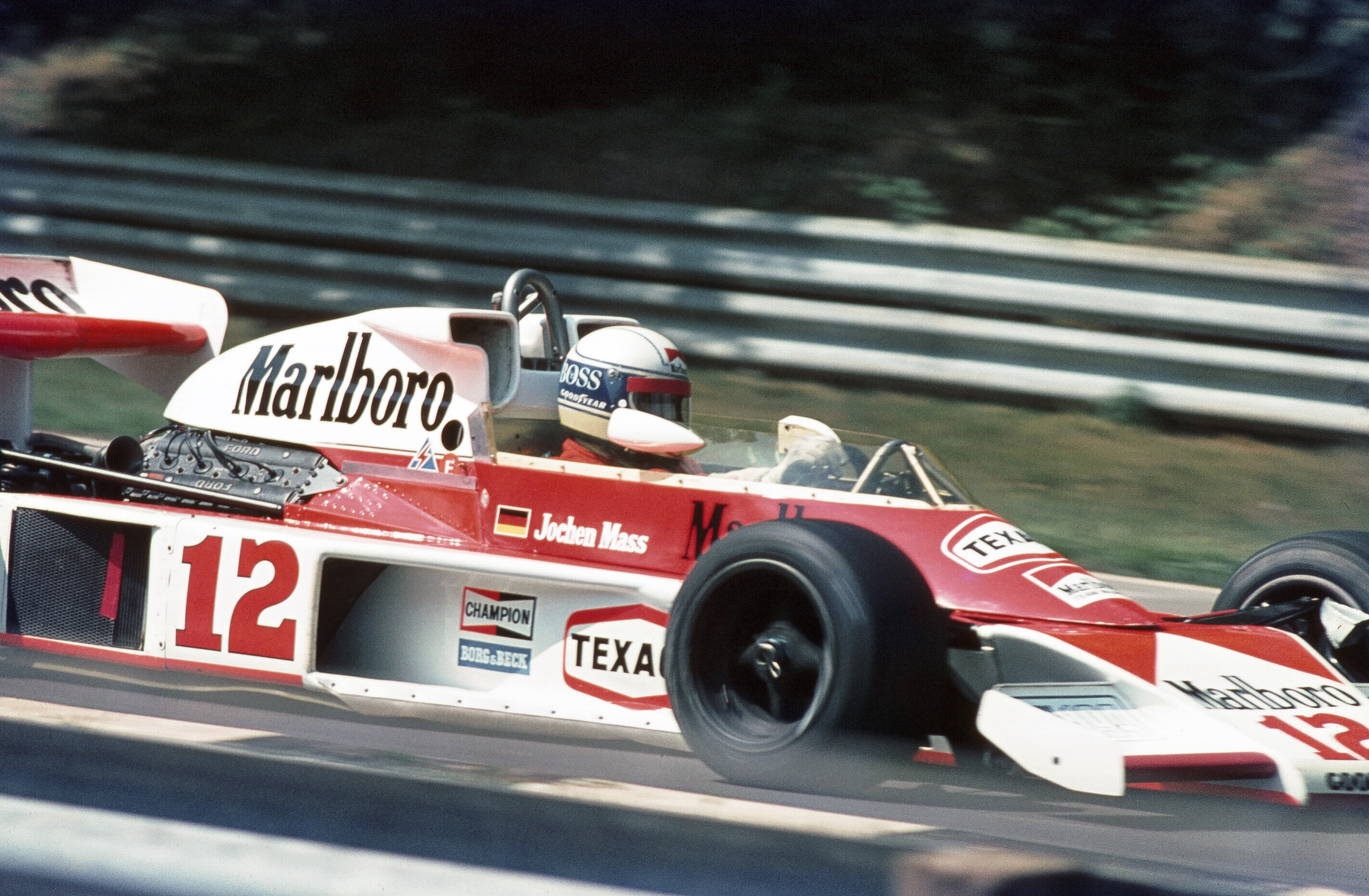
Left: James Hunt driving the McLaren with the high air box, Right: Jochen Mass driving the McLaren with the adapted air box, conformed to the new regulations

There had been no impactful regulation changes over the winter, but before the 1976 Spanish Grand Prix, a restriction was placed on the height of the air box to no more than 850 mm (33 in). This eliminated many eye-striking designs seen in the past years.

It was also stipulated at that time, that an F1 car could not be wider than 215 cm (85 in) (which remained valid until 1992). This caught out the McLaren team and James Hunt was disqualified, only for the decision to be overturned by the team's appeal.

== Season report ==
=== Race 1: Brazil ===
For the opening round of the season in Brazil at the 5-mile Interlagos circuit in São Paulo, James Hunt took pole position in his McLaren with reigning World Champion Niki Lauda alongside in his Ferrari (which set the tone for the season). Clay Regazzoni in the second Ferrari took the lead at the start. Regazzoni, Lauda, Hunt and Shadow's Jean-Pierre Jarier battled. Regazzoni and Jarier collided, and the former had to pit for repairs.

Lauda now led from Hunt and Jarier, but Hunt crashed out due to a sticking throttle, and Jarier did the same a lap later after driving on some oil in the track. Lauda thus started his title defence with victory, with Patrick Depailler second in the Tyrrell, and Tom Pryce completing the podium in the other Shadow.

=== Race 2: South Africa ===
At the Kyalami circuit near Johannesburg, Hunt took pole position for the second time in two races, with Lauda alongside again. It was Lauda who led into the first corner, with Hunt dropping down to fourth behind McLaren teammate Jochen Mass and Vittorio Brambilla in his March. Hunt was waved through by Mass, and passed Brambilla to take second after five laps. Lauda led from start to finish to win again, with Hunt second and Mass third for McLaren.

=== Race 3: United States GP West ===
Well after the South African race, the drivers assembled at Long Beach in the US for the third round. Regazzoni took pole position with Depailler second, forcing Hunt and Lauda onto the second row. The top four maintained their positions at the start, and almost immediately Regazzoni began to pull away. Hunt now tried to pass Depailler for second; they collided; Hunt was out, Depailler went wide, and Lauda sailed through to second.

Depailler kept third until a spin which dropped him well down the order, but he charged back up to fifth, and was back in third after Pryce's Shadow, and Jody Scheckter in the second Tyrrell retired after driveshaft and suspension failures respectively. Regazzoni went on to take a dominant victory, with Lauda completing the Ferrari 1–2, and Depailler third.

=== Race 4: Spain ===
As the European season began at the Jarama circuit near Madrid, there was a big talking point as the Tyrrell team entered a new P34 six-wheeler for Depailler. Depailler was on the pace and qualified third, behind Hunt and Lauda. Lauda once again beat Hunt off the line at the start and led for the first third of the race. Depailler, after a slow start, was running fourth behind Mass when he spun off and crashed with brake problems.

Just before mid-race, the McLarens of Hunt and Mass found another gear and drove past Lauda, but towards the end of the race, Mass had to retire with an engine failure. Hunt took his first win of the season, with Lauda second and Gunnar Nilsson's Lotus third.

After the race, Hunt was disqualified because his McLaren was found to be too wide. McLaren appealed, saying this was due to the expansion of the tyres during the race, and two months after the race, Hunt was reinstated.

=== Race 5: Belgium ===
The fifth round was at the Zolder circuit near the Dutch-Belgian border. Ferrari locked out the front row, with Lauda on pole from Regazzoni. Lauda motored away at the start, with Hunt up to second but, soon Regazzoni took the place back. The Ferraris raced away, and Hunt dropped to sixth, behind Jacques Laffite's Ligier and the two six-wheeled Tyrrells, before eventually retiring with a transmission failure. Depailler also retired when his engine blew up. Lauda won, and Regazzoni completed a dominant Ferrari 1–2, with Laffite taking his first podium.

=== Race 6: Monaco ===
Lauda took pole with Regazzoni alongside on the front row again. Lauda led into the first corner, and was never headed again. Ronnie Peterson's March got up to second, and allowed Lauda to pull away by holding up Regazzoni and the two Tyrrells. At one-third distance, Regazzoni went down an escape road because of oil on the track, and Peterson spun off and crashed on the next lap due to the same reason. This left Scheckter second and Depailler third but Regazzoni charged back and passed Depailler. He, however crashed out with 5 laps left while chasing Scheckter, thus ensuring that both the six-wheeled cars were on the podium behind Lauda.

Lauda now had a massive 33-point lead in the championship over Regazzoni and Hunt.

=== Race 7: Sweden ===
Scheckter took pole in Sweden at Anderstorp, the first for the Tyrrell P34, with Mario Andretti's Lotus second and Chris Amon an amazing 3rd on the grid in the Ensign. Andretti took the lead at the start, but went off with engine failure at around two thirds distance. The six-wheelers went on to dominate (much to the chagrin of some of the other teams) and finished 1–2, with Scheckter winning. Amon was robbed of a possible podium by a suspension failure. As a result, third place went to the consistent Lauda. With Hunt finishing fifth Scheckter was now second in the points for the world championship.

=== Race 8: France ===
The French round took place at the Paul Ricard circuit in the south of France, and 'normal service' was resumed, with Hunt on pole and Lauda second, with Depailler third, continuing Tyrrell's strong form. Lauda beat Hunt off the line as usual, and led the early stages until his engine failed. Hunt now led with Regazzoni close behind, but Regazzoni's Ferrari engine also failed. With the Ferraris out, any challenge to Hunt evaporated, and Hunt went on to win with Depailler second. Scheckter ran third until he faded away with engine trouble, giving John Watson third and Penske its first podium.

=== Race 9: Great Britain ===
The British fans had found a new hero in Hunt, but it was Lauda who took pole at Brands Hatch, beating the home hero Hunt into second, and Andretti showing Lotus's pace with third. At the start, Regazzoni began like a rocket and was immediately up to second, and was challenging Lauda. The two touched, and Regazzoni spun. He was hit by Hunt and Jacques Laffite but the rest of the field were away safely. However, there was too much debris on track, and the race was to be restarted. In controversial circumstances McLaren, Ferrari and Ligier had Hunt, Regazzoni and Laffite all take part in the restarted race in spare cars.

There was no trouble in the restart, as Lauda led from Hunt and Regazzoni into the first corner. The top three were unchanged till mid-race until Regazzoni retired with a gearbox problem, promoting Scheckter to third. Lauda led comfortably until he too suffered from gearbox troubles, and home hero Hunt took the lead with 15 minutes left, sending the home fans wild. Hunt went on to win, with Lauda hanging on to second and Scheckter third.

After the race, Ferrari, Tyrrell and the Fittipaldi team appealed against Hunt being allowed to take part in the spare car. Ferrari took the matter to the FIA (which was hypocritical since their own driver, Regazzoni had started in a spare, although he retired), and two months later, Hunt was disqualified and Lauda was given the win. Scheckter was promoted to second, Watson had another podium, and two-time champion Emerson Fittipaldi got sixth place and a point.

=== Race 10: West Germany ===
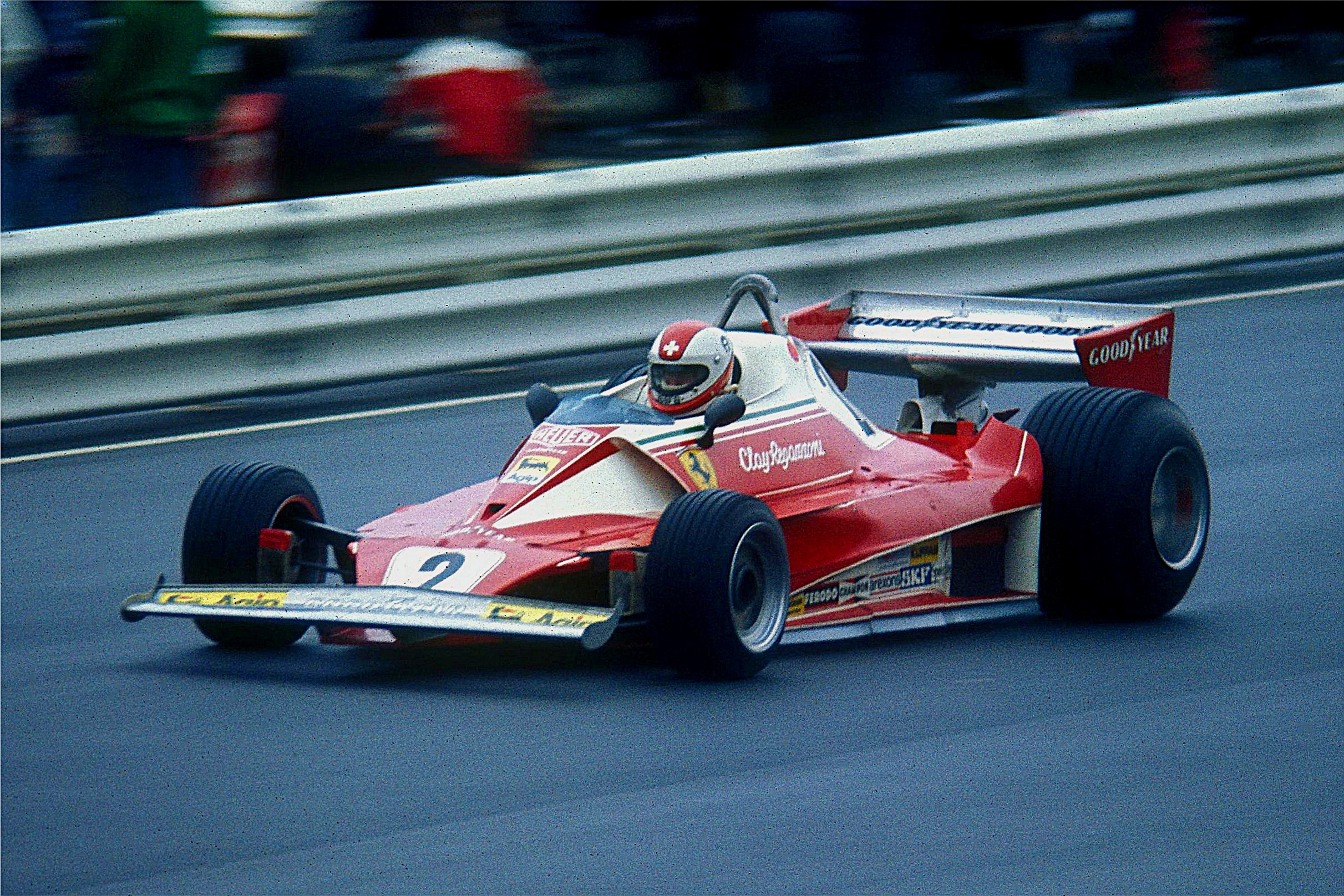
Regazzoni driving the Ferrari 312T2 at the Nürburgring in 1976.

There were concerns by the drivers in the German GP held at the legendary Nordschleife about the safety of the track. The mountainous Nordschleife section of the Nürburgring was 14 miles (23 km) long – almost 3 times longer than Interlagos, the next longest circuit on the calendar and 7 times longer than the Monaco street circuit and its size meant it was nearly impossible to manage it safely to 1976 regulatory standards- the organizers were not willing or able to provide up to 5 times the marshals, medical services and firefighters needed at this circuit than at any other F1 circuit.

Ultimately, all the drivers decided to race, and it was no surprise that Hunt and Lauda were on the front row, the British driver on pole, with Depailler heading the second row. At the start, on a damp but drying track, once again it was Regazzoni who started off best, whereas Lauda was slow and lost a lot of places. Regazzoni was leading from Hunt but he spun and dropped to fourth. At the end of the first lap, over eight minutes after the race started most of the drivers decided to pit for dry tyres. This left Mass's McLaren leading from Gunnar Nilsson.

On the second lap, Lauda lost control at high speed at a fast left before Bergwerk due to a suspected rear suspension failure and crashed into the barriers before bouncing back on to the track, and the car caught fire. The car was then hit by Harald Ertl's Hesketh and Brett Lunger's Surtees. The two drivers immediately got out of their cars, and soon Arturo Merzario stopped his Wolf–Williams as well and also Guy Edwards helped.

The four pulled Lauda out of the burning car, and the race was stopped. It took the one helicopter, which was parked at the pits on one extreme end of the circuit, at the track an excruciating 5 to 6 minutes to get to the accident site. Lauda was sent to hospital with serious burns and was fighting for his life.

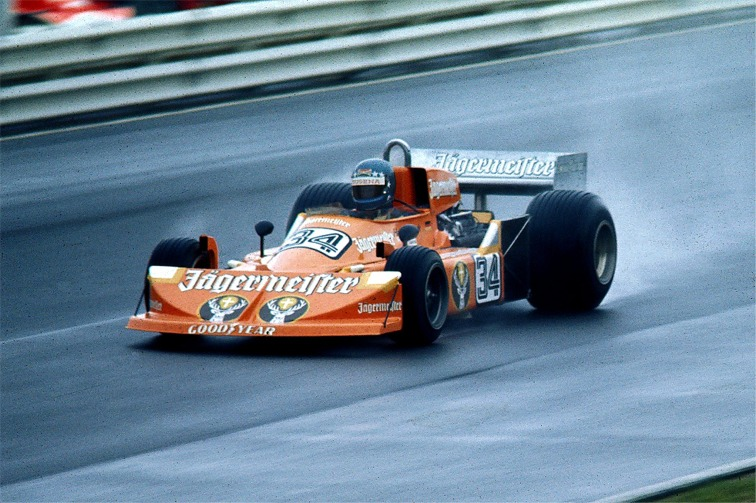
Hans-Joachim Stuck driving for the March team in the German Grand Prix

The race restarted, with the starting slots of Lauda, Ertl and Lunger left empty. Hunt led at the restarted race with Regazzoni up to second, but this did not last long as Regazzoni spun off and dropped back, and Depailler hit the barriers while trying to avoid him. This left Hunt with a big lead ahead of Carlos Pace in the Brabham, the Brabham team showing some speed. Soon, Scheckter was up to second, and Pace was passed by a recovering Regazzoni. Hunt eased to victory ahead of Scheckter, and Mass completed the podium by passing Pace after Regazzoni spun off (again).

Following Hunt's victory at the 14.2-mile (22.8 km) Nordschleife, the 1976 German Grand Prix marked the final Formula One race held at the original, old Nürburgring circuit. The German Grand Prix then moved further south to the Hockenheimring, and Grand Prix racing did not return to the Nürburgring until 1984, on the newly constructed 2.8-mile (4.5 km) Grand Prix circuit.

=== Race 11: Austria ===
The news before the Austrian GP at the Österreichring was that Lauda's condition was no longer life-threatening, but there was a low attendance with Lauda not racing; and Ferrari were so shaken by Lauda's crash that they did not compete at all. Hunt meanwhile took pole, ahead of countryman Watson and Ronnie Peterson. Watson took the lead at the start ahead of Peterson and Hunt, but soon Peterson was in the lead.

Scheckter was on a charge from the mid-field, and he took the lead on the 10th lap, but then Watson was back in front. Scheckter battled until he crashed due to a suspension failure, and Peterson ultimately began to drop back. Watson thus won, the result being his first win and Penske's only win, and the podium was completed by Laffite and Nilsson. As of 2025, this remains the last World Championship race that Ferrari did not enter and the last time an American-licensed constructor won a F1 race.

=== Race 12: Netherlands ===
Lauda had begun his recovery, and was planning to race later in the season, and as a result, Ferrari were back in business in the Netherlands, but with only one car for Regazzoni. It was Peterson who took pole at Zandvoort, beating pole king Hunt and Tom Pryce's Shadow. Peterson led the early stages ahead of Watson, until Watson made a mistake which let Hunt through. Peterson then struggled and dropped behind Hunt, Watson and Regazzoni.

Watson retired with a gearbox failure, promoting Regazzoni and Peterson, but the latter also retired when he lost oil pressure. Regazzoni now closed up on Hunt, bringing Mario Andretti with him, but Hunt held them off, with Regazzoni and Andretti within two seconds of him in second and third.

=== Race 13: Italy ===
After the Dutch GP, with Hunt only two points behind Lauda, the championship seemed to be a cakewalk for him. But then came the news that Lauda was going to make an astonishing return for the last four races of the season (it was so unexpected that Ferrari had to run three cars for Lauda, Regazzoni, and Lauda's supposed replacement Carlos Reutemann), just six weeks after his accident.

As the event went on at the modified Monza circuit, Laffite took pole in qualifying, with Scheckter's six-wheeler alongside and Pace third. Lauda was fifth, and Hunt along with Watson and Mass were penalised and sent to the back because of supposed fuel irregularities. At the start, Scheckter led ahead of Laffite and Depailler with Lauda down in the midfield, but soon Peterson was on a charge and took the lead after 14 laps. Peterson's charge also brought Regazzoni with him, and soon the Swiss was up to third.

Scheckter dropped off, and the top four of Peterson, Depailler, Regazzoni and Laffite ran closely. Hunt spun off while trying to charge up the field, and Depailler dropped back late on with engine trouble. Peterson took his first win in two years, with Regazzoni second, Laffite third, and Lauda an incredible fourth.

=== Race 14: Canada ===
The week-long North American tour started with the teams assembling at the scenic Mosport Park track near Toronto for the Canadian Grand Prix. Hunt's disqualification from the British GP came after the Italian race, and as a result Hunt had only 47 points to Lauda's 64 with three races left. The Englishman took pole, with Peterson also on the front row ahead of March teammate Vittorio Brambilla. As usual, Hunt did not start well, and Peterson took the lead.

It was not for long as Hunt retook the lead on lap 10, and soon both Marches dropped way back, and so Depailler was second and Andretti third. The top three of Hunt, Depailler and Andretti were unchanged for the rest of the race. Lauda was running fifth until handling issues dropped him out of the points, and Hunt had closed the gap to 8 points.

=== Race 15: United States ===
The penultimate round and the second leg of the North American tour was in the US at Watkins Glen, New York, a circuit similar (and close by) to Mosport Park in that it was fast and scenic with a number of long, sweeping corners. Hunt took his eighth pole of the season, with the six-wheeler of Scheckter alongside, and Peterson third. As expected, Scheckter took the lead at the start, with Hunt and Brambilla following. The front two pulled away and battled, with Hunt passing Scheckter mid-race and Scheckter returning the favour a few laps later. Hunt took the lead again with 14 laps left and went on to win, and Scheckter had to settle for second. The Marches were again unable to keep up the pace, and it was left to Lauda to take an astonishing podium, just beating Mass in the second McLaren.

=== Race 16: Japan ===
The championship was to be decided in Japan at the fast Fuji Speedway near Tokyo, and Lauda was leading Hunt by three points. In qualifying, Hunt took second, but Lauda was right behind in third as Andretti took pole for Lotus. On race day, it rained heavily, and the weather was dreadful with the track full of water and the rain pelting down. Hunt got a good start for once, and took the lead from Andretti. Some of the drivers protested, saying it was too dangerous to race.

At the end of the second lap, Lauda came into the pits and withdrew, saying that the conditions were too dangerous. Emerson Fittipaldi and Carlos Pace also withdrew. At the front, Hunt was leading but was soon challenged by Brambilla until the Italian spun out of contention. By mid-race, Mass had jumped up to second behind his teammate and acted as a protective buffer, but then crashed out.

Hunt led from Depailler and Andretti, but then began to suffer from tyre wear, and both drivers passed with 11 laps left. This was still fine as Hunt was third and needed only three points to become World Champion, because he had more wins than Lauda. This became second when Depailler's tyres gave out, and he suffered a puncture but soon Hunt himself also had the same fate and had to pit.

Andretti now led, with Alan Jones's Surtees second, Regazzoni third, Depailler fourth and Hunt fifth. On old, worn-out tyres, Jones and Regazzoni were fighting just to save their tyres, and first Depailler, and then Hunt with just two laps left passed both of them. Andretti won, getting his first win in five years, with Depailler second, and Hunt's third place meant that he was the F1 World Champion of 1976.

== Results and standings ==
=== Grands Prix ===
The 1976 World Championship of Drivers and the International Cup for Formula 1 Manufacturers were contested concurrently over a sixteen race series.

Round	Grand Prix	Pole position	Fastest lap	Winning driver	Winning constructor	Report
1	(Brazil) Brazilian Grand Prix	(United Kingdom) James Hunt	(France) Jean-Pierre Jarier	(Austria) Niki Lauda	(Italy) Ferrari	Report
2	(South Africa) South African Grand Prix	(United Kingdom) James Hunt	(Austria) Niki Lauda	(Austria) Niki Lauda	(Italy) Ferrari	Report
3	United States Grand Prix West	(Switzerland) Clay Regazzoni	(Switzerland) Clay Regazzoni	(Switzerland) Clay Regazzoni	(Italy) Ferrari	Report
4	(Spain) Spanish Grand Prix	(United Kingdom) James Hunt	(West Germany) Jochen Mass	(United Kingdom) James Hunt	(United Kingdom) McLaren-Ford	Report
5	(Belgium) Belgian Grand Prix	(Austria) Niki Lauda	(Austria) Niki Lauda	(Austria) Niki Lauda	(Italy) Ferrari	Report
6	Monaco Grand Prix	(Austria) Niki Lauda	(Switzerland) Clay Regazzoni	(Austria) Niki Lauda	(Italy) Ferrari	Report
7	(Sweden) Swedish Grand Prix	(South Africa) Jody Scheckter	(United States) Mario Andretti	(South Africa) Jody Scheckter	(United Kingdom) Tyrrell-Ford	Report
8	(France) French Grand Prix	(United Kingdom) James Hunt	(Austria) Niki Lauda	(United Kingdom) James Hunt	(United Kingdom) McLaren-Ford	Report
9	(United Kingdom) British Grand Prix	(Austria) Niki Lauda	(Austria) Niki Lauda	(Austria) Niki Lauda (Note: James Hunt originally finished first, but was disqualified for outside assistance, Niki Lauda, originally finished second, inherited the win.)	(Italy) Ferrari	Report
10	(West Germany) German Grand Prix	(United Kingdom) James Hunt	(South Africa) Jody Scheckter	(United Kingdom) James Hunt	(United Kingdom) McLaren-Ford	Report
11	(Austria) Austrian Grand Prix	(United Kingdom) James Hunt	(United Kingdom) James Hunt	(United Kingdom) John Watson	(United States) Penske-Ford	Report
12	(Netherlands) Dutch Grand Prix	(Sweden) Ronnie Peterson	(Switzerland) Clay Regazzoni	(United Kingdom) James Hunt	(United Kingdom) McLaren-Ford	Report
13	(Italy) Italian Grand Prix	(France) Jacques Laffite	(Sweden) Ronnie Peterson	(Sweden) Ronnie Peterson	(United Kingdom) March-Ford	Report
14	(Canada) Canadian Grand Prix	(United Kingdom) James Hunt	(France) Patrick Depailler	(United Kingdom) James Hunt	(United Kingdom) McLaren-Ford	Report
15	United States Grand Prix	(United Kingdom) James Hunt	(United Kingdom) James Hunt	(United Kingdom) James Hunt	(United Kingdom) McLaren-Ford	Report
16	(Japan) Japanese Grand Prix	(United States) Mario Andretti	(France) Jacques Laffite	(United States) Mario Andretti	(United Kingdom) Lotus-Ford	Report

=== Scoring system ===
Points were awarded to the top six classified finishers. The International Cup for F1 Manufacturers only counted the points of the highest-finishing driver for each race. For both the Championship and the Cup, the best seven results from rounds 1-8 and the best seven results from rounds 9-16 were counted.

Numbers without parentheses are championship points; numbers in parentheses are total points scored. Points were awarded in the following system:

Position	1st	2nd	3rd	4th	5th	6th
Points	9	6	4	3	2	1

=== World Drivers' Championship standings ===
Pos	Driver	BRA (Brazil)	RSA (South Africa)	USW (United States)	ESP (Spain)	BEL (Belgium)	MON (Monaco)	SWE (Sweden)	FRA (France)	GBR (United Kingdom)	GER (West Germany)	AUT (Austria)	NED (Netherlands)	ITA (Italy)	CAN (Canada)	USA (United States)	JPN (Japan)	Pts
1	(United Kingdom) James Hunt	Ret^{P}	2^{P}	Ret	1^{P}	Ret	Ret	5	1^{P}	DSQ	1^{P}	4^{P}^{F}	1	Ret	1^{P}	1^{P}^{F}	3	69
2	(Austria) Niki Lauda	1	1^{F}	2	2	1^{P}^{F}	1^{P}	3	Ret^{F}	1^{P}^{F}	Ret			4	8	3	Ret	68
3	(South Africa) Jody Scheckter	5	4	Ret	Ret	4	2	1^{P}	6	2	2^{F}	Ret	5	5	4	2	Ret	49
4	(France) Patrick Depailler	2	9	3	Ret	Ret	3	2	2	Ret	Ret	Ret	7	6	2^{F}	Ret	2	39
5	(Switzerland) Clay Regazzoni	7	Ret	1^{P}^{F}	11	2	14^{F}	6	Ret	DSQ	9		2^{F}	2	6	7	5	31
6	(United States) Mario Andretti	Ret	6	Ret	Ret	Ret		Ret^{F}	5	Ret	12	5	3	Ret	3	Ret	1^{P}	22
7	(United Kingdom) John Watson	Ret	5	NC	Ret	7	10	Ret	3	3	7	1	Ret	11	10	6	Ret	20
8	(France) Jacques Laffite	Ret	Ret	4	12	3	12	4	14	DSQ	Ret	2	Ret	3^{P}	Ret	Ret	7^{F}	20
9	(West Germany) Jochen Mass	6	3	5	Ret^{F}	6	5	11	15	Ret	3	7	9	Ret	5	4	Ret	19
10	(Sweden) Gunnar Nilsson		Ret	Ret	3	Ret	Ret	Ret	Ret	Ret	5	3	Ret	13	12	Ret	6	11
11	(Sweden) Ronnie Peterson	Ret	Ret	10	Ret	Ret	Ret	7	19	Ret	Ret	6	Ret^{P}	1^{F}	9	Ret	Ret	10
12	(United Kingdom) Tom Pryce	3	7	Ret	8	10	7	9	8	4	8	Ret	4	8	11	Ret	Ret	10
13	(West Germany) Hans-Joachim Stuck	4	12	Ret	Ret	Ret	4	Ret	7	Ret	Ret	Ret	Ret	Ret	Ret	5	Ret	8
14	(Brazil) Carlos Pace	10	Ret	9	6	Ret	9	8	4	8	4	Ret	Ret	Ret	7	Ret	Ret	7
15	(Australia) Alan Jones			NC	9	5	Ret	13	Ret	5	10	Ret	8	12	16	8	4	7
16	(Argentina) Carlos Reutemann	12	Ret	Ret	4	Ret	Ret	Ret	11	Ret	Ret	Ret	Ret	9				3
17	(Brazil) Emerson Fittipaldi	13	17	6	Ret	DNQ	6	Ret	Ret	6	13	Ret	Ret	15	Ret	9	Ret	3
18	(New Zealand) Chris Amon		14	8	5	Ret	13	Ret		Ret	Ret				DNS			2
19	(Italy) Vittorio Brambilla	Ret	8	Ret	Ret	Ret	Ret	10	Ret	Ret	Ret	Ret	6	7	14	Ret	Ret	1
20	(West Germany) Rolf Stommelen										6		12	Ret				1
—	(Austria) Harald Ertl		15	DNQ	DNQ	Ret	DNQ	Ret	Ret	7	Ret	8	Ret	16	DNS	13	8	0
—	(France) Jean-Pierre Jarier	Ret^{F}	Ret	7	Ret	9	8	12	12	9	11	Ret	10	19	18	10	10	0
—	(Belgium) Jacky Ickx	8	16	DNQ	7	DNQ	DNQ		10	DNQ			Ret	10	13	Ret		0
—	(Australia) Larry Perkins				13	8	DNQ	Ret					Ret	Ret	17	Ret	Ret	0
—	(France) Henri Pescarolo						DNQ		Ret	Ret	DNQ	9	11	17	19	NC		0
—	(Italy) Arturo Merzario			DNQ	Ret	Ret	DNQ	14	9	Ret	Ret	Ret	Ret	DNS	Ret	Ret	Ret	0
—	(Italy) Renzo Zorzi	9																0
—	(Japan) Noritake Takahara																9	0
—	(France) Michel Leclère		13	DNQ	10	11	11	Ret	13									0
—	(United States) Brett Lunger		11	DNQ	DNQ	Ret		15	16	Ret	Ret	10		14	15	11		0
—	(United Kingdom) Bob Evans		10	DNQ						Ret								0
—	(Italy) Alessandro Pesenti-Rossi										14	11	DNQ	18				0
—	(Brazil) Ingo Hoffmann	11		DNQ	DNQ				DNQ									0
—	(Japan) Masahiro Hasemi																11	0
—	(Switzerland) Loris Kessel				DNQ	12		Ret	DNQ			NC						0
—	(Italy) Lella Lombardi	14								DNQ	DNQ	12						0
—	(Brazil) Alex Ribeiro															12		0
—	(Australia) Warwick Brown															14		0
—	(United Kingdom) Guy Edwards					DNQ			17	Ret	15			DNS	20			0
—	(Belgium) Patrick Nève					Ret			18									0
—	(Austria) Hans Binder											Ret					Ret	0
—	(United Kingdom) Ian Ashley	Ret																0
—	(South Africa) Ian Scheckter		Ret															0
—	(Netherlands) Boy Hayje												Ret					0
—	(Sweden) Conny Andersson												Ret					0
—	(Japan) Kazuyoshi Hoshino																Ret	0
—	(Austria) Otto Stuppacher													DNS	DNQ	DNQ		0
—	(Japan) Masami Kuwashima																DNS	0
—	(Spain) Emilio de Villota				DNQ													0
—	(Spain) Emilio Zapico				DNQ													0
—	(Denmark) Jac Nellemann							DNQ										0
—	(United Kingdom) Damien Magee								DNQ									0
—	(United Kingdom) Mike Wilds									DNQ								0
—	(United Kingdom) Divina Galica									DNQ								0
—	(United Kingdom) Tony Trimmer																DNQ	0
Pos	Driver	BRA (Brazil)	RSA (South Africa)	USW (United States)	ESP (Spain)	BEL (Belgium)	MON (Monaco)	SWE (Sweden)	FRA (France)	GBR (United Kingdom)	GER (West Germany)	AUT (Austria)	NED (Netherlands)	ITA (Italy)	CAN (Canada)	USA (United States)	JPN (Japan)	Pts

Key
Colour	Result
Gold	Winner
Silver	Second place
Bronze	Third place
Green	Other points position
Blue	Other classified position
Blue	Not classified, finished (NC)
Purple	Not classified, retired (Ret)
Red	Did not qualify (DNQ)
Black	Disqualified (DSQ)
White	Did not start (DNS)
White	Race cancelled (C)
Blank	Did not practice (DNP)
Blank	Excluded (EX)
Blank	Did not arrive (DNA)
Blank	Withdrawn (WD)
Blank	Did not enter (empty cell)
Annotation	Meaning
P	Pole position
F	Fastest lap

=== International Cup for F1 Manufacturers standings ===
Pos	Constructor	BRA (Brazil)	RSA (South Africa)	USW (United States)	ESP (Spain)	BEL (Belgium)	MON (Monaco)	SWE (Sweden)	FRA (France)	GBR (United Kingdom)	GER (West Germany)	AUT (Austria)	NED (Netherlands)	ITA (Italy)	CAN (Canada)	USA (United States)	JPN (Japan)	Pts
1	(Italy) Ferrari	1	1	1	2	1	1	3	Ret	1	9	WD	2	2	6	3	5	83
2	(United Kingdom) McLaren-Ford	6	2	5	1	6	5	5	1	Ret	1	4	1	Ret	1	1	3	74 (75)
3	(United Kingdom) Tyrrell-Ford	2	4	3	Ret	4	2	1	2	2	2	11	5	5	2	2	2	71
4	(United Kingdom) Lotus-Ford	Ret	10	Ret	3	Ret	Ret	Ret	5	Ret	5	3	3	13	3	Ret	1	29
5	(United States) Penske-Ford	Ret	5	NC	Ret	7	10	Ret	3	3	7	1	Ret	11	10	6	Ret	20
6	(France) Ligier-Matra	Ret	Ret	4	12	3	12	4	14	DSQ	Ret	2	Ret	3	Ret	Ret	7	20
7	(United Kingdom) March-Ford	4	8	10	Ret	Ret	4	7	7	Ret	Ret	6	6	1	9	5	Ret	19
8	(United Kingdom) Shadow-Ford	3	7	7	8	9	7	9	8	4	8	Ret	4	8	11	10	10	10
9	(United Kingdom) Brabham-Alfa Romeo	10	Ret	9	4	Ret	9	8	4	8	4	Ret	Ret	Ret	7	Ret	Ret	9
10	(United Kingdom) Surtees-Ford		11	NC	9	5	Ret	13	16	5	10	9	8	12	15	8	4	7
11	(Brazil) Fittipaldi-Ford	11	17	6	Ret	DNQ	6	Ret	Ret	6	13	Ret	Ret	15	Ret	9	Ret	3
12	(United Kingdom) Ensign-Ford		14	8	5	Ret	13	Ret	18	Ret	Ret	Ret	Ret	10	13	Ret	WD	2
13	(United States) Parnelli-Ford		6	Ret														1
—	(United Kingdom) Hesketh-Ford		15	DNQ	DNQ	Ret	DNQ	Ret	17	7	15	8	12	16	20	12	8	0
—	(Canada) Wolf-Williams-Ford	8	13	DNQ	7	11	11	Ret	10	DNQ	Ret	Ret	Ret	DNQ	Ret	14	Ret	0
—	(Netherlands) Boro-Ford				13	8	DNQ	Ret			WD		Ret	Ret				0
—	(Japan) Kojima-Ford																11	0
—	(United Kingdom) Brabham-Ford				DNQ	12		Ret	DNQ	Ret	DNS	12		WD			WD	0
—	(United Kingdom) BRM	Ret	WD															0
—	(United Kingdom) Williams-Ford				DNQ													0
—	(Japan) Maki-Ford																DNQ	0
Pos	Constructor	BRA (Brazil)	RSA (South Africa)	USW (United States)	ESP (Spain)	BEL (Belgium)	MON (Monaco)	SWE (Sweden)	FRA (France)	GBR (United Kingdom)	GER (West Germany)	AUT (Austria)	NED (Netherlands)	ITA (Italy)	CAN (Canada)	USA (United States)	JPN (Japan)	Pts

- Bold results counted to championship.

== Non-championship races ==
Two non-championship races for Formula One cars were also held in 1976.

Race Name	Circuit	Date	Winning driver	Constructor	Report
(United Kingdom) XI Race of Champions	Brands Hatch	14 March	(United Kingdom) James Hunt	(United Kingdom) McLaren-Cosworth	Report
(United Kingdom) XXVIII BRDC International Trophy	Silverstone	11 April	(United Kingdom) James Hunt	(United Kingdom) McLaren-Cosworth	Report

== See also ==
- Hunt–Lauda rivalry
