= 1976 Italian Grand Prix =

Race 13 of 16 in the 1976 Formula One season
← Previous race	Next race →
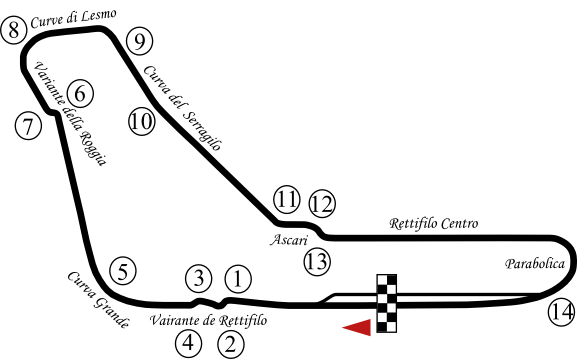

Race details
- Date: September 12, 1976
- Official name: XLVII Gran Premio d'Italia
- Location: Autodromo Nazionale di Monza, Monza
- Course: Permanent racing facility
- Course length: 5.800 km (3.604 miles)
- Distance: 52 laps, 301.6 km (187.2 miles)

Pole position
Driver	(France) Jacques Laffite	Ligier-Matra
- Time: 1:41.35

Fastest lap
Driver	(Sweden) Ronnie Peterson	March-Ford
- Time: 1:41.3 on lap 50

Podium
First	(Sweden) Ronnie Peterson	March-Ford
Second	(Switzerland) Clay Regazzoni	Ferrari
Third	(France) Jacques Laffite	Ligier-Matra

The 1976 Italian Grand Prix was a Formula One motor race held at the Autodromo Nazionale di Monza in Monza, Italy on 12 September 1976. The race, contested over 52 laps, was the thirteenth round of the 1976 Formula One season. It was also the 45th running of the Italian Grand Prix, the 23rd which was a part of the World Championship. Ronnie Peterson took the March team's last victory in Formula One, and his only with the team. Ferrari driver Clay Regazzoni finished the race in second position and polesitter Jacques Laffite completed the podium for Ligier.

The race saw the return of World Championship leader Niki Lauda to the sport after his serious crash at the German Grand Prix. He finished in fourth place. Carlos Reutemann had been hired by Ferrari as a replacement for Lauda, and so they had negotiated his release from Brabham, effective with this race. Due to Lauda's unexpected early return, Reutemann was no longer necessary as a replacement, but he was still allowed to run this only race (finishing in 9th place). In consequence, this was the last time Ferrari entered more than two cars for a race. For compensation Reutemann was given a full contract for the next Ferrari season.

== Background ==
Monza had been modified from the year before. The circuit featured 2 consecutive left-right chicanes creating the Variante del Rettifilo, added before the Curva Grande, and a left-right chicane called Variante della Roggia that was added before the first Lesmo curve.

== Qualifying ==
The qualifying session on Friday was wet, so the dry session on Saturday was to provide the field with their best times. After this session, Brett Lunger, Arturo Merzario and the very slow Otto Stuppacher had failed to qualify. John Watson qualified in eighth position, with James Hunt ninth and Jochen Mass tenth, but their times were later disallowed due to alleged fuel irregularities, an allegation that was later withdrawn. This meant that their Friday times counted for their grid positions. As a result, these three drivers were the three slowest and were deemed not to have qualified, allowing Lunger, Merzario and Stuppacher on to the grid.

Stuppacher had already left the circuit and flown back home to Austria, so could not take his place on the grid. This promoted Hunt back into the 26 qualifiers. Merzario withdrew and promoted Mass, and later Guy Edwards also decided to withdraw in order to let Watson race.

Following the bankruptcy of the Boro team prior to the event, driver Larry Perkins convinced team management to release two mechanics to run an entry at Monza and qualified a season-best 13th.

=== Qualifying classification ===
Pos	No.	Driver	Constructor	Lap	Gap
1	26	(France) Jacques Laffite	Ligier-Matra	1:41.35	—
2	3	(South Africa) Jody Scheckter	Tyrrell-Ford	1:41.38	+ 0.03
3	8	(Brazil) Carlos Pace	Brabham-Alfa Romeo	1:41.53	+ 0.18
4	4	(France) Patrick Depailler	Tyrrell-Ford	1:42.06	+ 0.71
5	1	(Austria) Niki Lauda	Ferrari	1:42.09	+ 0.74
6	34	(Germany) Hans Joachim Stuck	March-Ford	1:42.18	+ 0.83
7	35	(Argentina) Carlos Reutemann	Ferrari	1:42.38	+ 1.03
8	10	(Sweden) Ronnie Peterson	March-Ford	1:42.64	+ 1.29
9	2	(Switzerland) Clay Regazzoni	Ferrari	1:42.96	+ 1.61
10	22	(Belgium) Jacky Ickx	Ensign-Ford	1:43.29	+ 1.94
11	7	(West Germany) Rolf Stommelen	Brabham-Alfa Romeo	1:43.29	+ 1.94
12	6	(Sweden) Gunnar Nilsson	Lotus-Ford	1:43.30	+ 1.95
13	40	(Australia) Larry Perkins	Boro-Ford	1:43.32	+ 1.97
14	5	(United States) Mario Andretti	Lotus-Ford	1:43.34	+ 1.99
15	16	(United Kingdom) Tom Pryce	Shadow-Ford	1:43.63	+ 2.28
16	9	(Italy) Vittorio Brambilla	March-Ford	1:43.94	+ 2.59
17	17	(France) Jean-Pierre Jarier	Shadow-Ford	1:44.05	+ 2.70
18	19	(Australia) Alan Jones	Surtees-Ford	1:44.41	+ 3.06
19	24	(Austria) Harald Ertl	Hesketh-Ford	1:44.56	+ 3.21
20	30	(Brazil) Emerson Fittipaldi	Fittipaldi-Ford	1:44.57	+ 3.22
21	37	(Italy) Alessandro Pesenti-Rossi	Tyrrell-Ford	1:44.62	+ 3.27
22	38	(France) Henri Pescarolo	Surtees-Ford	1:45.12	+ 3.77
23	25	(United Kingdom) Guy Edwards	Hesketh-Ford	1:45.79	+ 4.44
24	18	(United States) Brett Lunger	Surtees-Ford	1:46.48	+ 5.13
25	20	(Italy) Arturo Merzario	Wolf-Williams-Ford	1:47.31	+ 5.96
26	39	(Austria) Otto Stuppacher	Tyrrell-Ford	1:55.22	+ 13.87
27	11	(United Kingdom) James Hunt	McLaren-Ford	2:08.76	+ 27.41
28	12	(West Germany) Jochen Mass	McLaren-Ford	2:11.06	+ 29.71
29	28	(United Kingdom) John Watson	Penske-Ford	2:13.95	+ 32.60

== Race ==
At the start, Jody Scheckter in the Tyrrell led ahead of Laffite's Ligier and teammate Patrick Depailler with Lauda down in the midfield. Mass, despite being promoted to 25th after Merzario withdrew, retired on lap 3 with ignition problems. McLaren's misfortunes didn't end there as Hunt, who had no chance of winning had tried to charge his way up through the field and spun off into gravel trap at the first corner chicane on lap 12. Peterson in the March had begun his charge up the field and took the lead on lap 15 as Scheckter dropped out of the top 4 leaving Peterson to battle with Depailler, Regazzoni and Laffite. Meanwhile, Hans Joachim Stuck in the other March collided with the Lotus of Mario Andretti on lap 24 forcing both drivers to retire. In the closing stages Depailler was suffering from engine problems but eventually finished 6th as Lauda got past both the Tyrrells for 4th place. Peterson took his first win in 2 years by 2.3 seconds over Regazzoni followed by Laffite in a strong third 3 seconds behind Peterson with Lauda fourth and the Tyrrells of Scheckter and Depailler rounding out the top 6.

=== Race classification ===
Pos	No	Driver	Constructor	Laps	Time/Retired	Grid	Points
1	10	(Sweden) Ronnie Peterson	March-Ford	52	1:30:35.6	8	9
2	2	(Switzerland) Clay Regazzoni	Ferrari	52	+ 2.3	9	6
3	26	(France) Jacques Laffite	Ligier-Matra	52	+ 3.0	1	4
4	1	(Austria) Niki Lauda	Ferrari	52	+ 19.4	5	3
5	3	(South Africa) Jody Scheckter	Tyrrell-Ford	52	+ 19.5	2	2
6	4	(France) Patrick Depailler	Tyrrell-Ford	52	+ 35.7	4	1
7	9	(Italy) Vittorio Brambilla	March-Ford	52	+ 43.9	16	
8	16	(United Kingdom) Tom Pryce	Shadow-Ford	52	+ 52.9	15	
9	35	(Argentina) Carlos Reutemann	Ferrari	52	+ 57.5	7	
10	22	(Belgium) Jacky Ickx	Ensign-Ford	52	+ 1:12.4	10	
11	28	(United Kingdom) John Watson	Penske-Ford	52	+ 1:42.2	27	
12	19	(Australia) Alan Jones	Surtees-Ford	51	+ 1 Lap	18	
13	6	(Sweden) Gunnar Nilsson	Lotus-Ford	51	+ 1 Lap	12	
14	18	(United States) Brett Lunger	Surtees-Ford	50	+ 2 Laps	24	
15	30	(Brazil) Emerson Fittipaldi	Fittipaldi-Ford	50	+ 2 Laps	20	
16	24	(Austria) Harald Ertl	Hesketh-Ford	49	Halfshaft	19	
17	38	(France) Henri Pescarolo	Surtees-Ford	49	+ 3 Laps	22	
18	37	(Italy) Alessandro Pesenti-Rossi	Tyrrell-Ford	49	+ 3 Laps	21	
19	17	(France) Jean-Pierre Jarier	Shadow-Ford	47	+ 5 Laps	17	
Ret	7	(West Germany) Rolf Stommelen	Brabham-Alfa Romeo	41	Fuel System	11	
Ret	34	(West Germany) Hans Joachim Stuck	March-Ford	23	Accident	6	
Ret	5	(United States) Mario Andretti	Lotus-Ford	23	Accident	14	
Ret	11	(United Kingdom) James Hunt	McLaren-Ford	11	Spun Off	25	
Ret	40	(Australia) Larry Perkins	Boro-Ford	8	Engine	13	
Ret	8	(Brazil) Carlos Pace	Brabham-Alfa Romeo	4	Engine	3	
Ret	12	(West Germany) Jochen Mass	McLaren-Ford	2	Ignition	26	
DNS	25	(United Kingdom) Guy Edwards	Hesketh-Ford		Withdrew	23	
DNS	20	(Italy) Arturo Merzario	Wolf-Williams-Ford		Withdrew		
DNS	39	(Austria) Otto Stuppacher	Tyrrell-Ford		Withdrew		

== Notes ==
- This was the Formula One World Championship debut for Austrian driver Otto Stuppacher.
- This was the 5th fastest lap set by a Swedish driver.
- This was the 5th Grand Prix start for Boro.
- This race marked the 1st pole position for Ligier.

== Championship standings after the race ==
Drivers' Championship standings

	Pos	Driver	Points
	1	(Austria) **Niki Lauda***	61
	2	(United Kingdom) **James Hunt***	56
	3	(South Africa) **Jody Scheckter***	38
1	4	(Switzerland) Clay Regazzoni	28
1	5	(France) Patrick Depailler	27

Constructors' Championship standings

	Pos	Constructor	Points
	1	(Italy) **Ferrari***	73
	2	(United Kingdom) **McLaren-Ford***	61 (62)
	3	(United Kingdom) **Tyrrell-Ford***	51
1	4	(France) Ligier-Matra	20
1	5	(United States) Penske-Ford	18

- Note: Only the top five positions are included for both sets of standings. Only the best 7 results from the first 8 races and the best 7 results from the last 8 races counted towards the Championship. Numbers without parentheses are Championship points; numbers in parentheses are total points scored. Points do not reflect final results of 1976 British Grand Prix as it was under appeal.
- Competitors in bold and marked with an asterisk still had a theoretical chance of becoming World Champion.

Previous race: 1976 Dutch Grand Prix	FIA Formula One World Championship; 1976 season	Next race: 1976 Canadian Grand Prix
Previous race: 1975 Italian Grand Prix	Italian Grand Prix	Next race: 1977 Italian Grand Prix
