= 1976 Dutch Grand Prix =

Race 12 of 16 in the 1976 Formula One season
← Previous race	Next race →

Race details
- Date: August 29, 1976
- Official name: XXIII Grote Prijs van Nederland
- Location: Circuit Park Zandvoort; Zandvoort, Netherlands
- Course: Permanent racing facility
- Course length: 4.226 km (2.626 miles)
- Distance: 75 laps, 316.960 km (196.950 miles)
- Weather: Warm, dry

Pole position
Driver	(Sweden) Ronnie Peterson	March-Ford
- Time: 1:21.31

Fastest lap
Driver	(Switzerland) Clay Regazzoni	Ferrari
- Time: 1:22.59 on lap 49

Podium
First	(United Kingdom) James Hunt	McLaren-Ford
Second	(Switzerland) Clay Regazzoni	Ferrari
Third	(United States) Mario Andretti	Lotus-Ford

The 1976 Dutch Grand Prix was a Formula One motor race held at Circuit Zandvoort on 29 August 1976. It was won by British driver James Hunt driving a McLaren M23 on his 29th birthday. The race, contested over 75 laps, was the twelfth round of the 1976 Formula One season.

The weekend was marred by the death of track marshal Ron Lenderink during a touring car support race; he was 29.

== Qualifying ==
=== Qualifying classification ===
Pos	Driver	Team	Time
1	(Sweden) Ronnie Peterson	March-Ford	1:21.31
2	(United Kingdom) James Hunt	McLaren-Ford	1:21.39
3	(United Kingdom) Tom Pryce	Shadow-Ford	1:21.55
4	(United Kingdom) John Watson	Penske-Ford	1:21.62
5	(Switzerland) Clay Regazzoni	Ferrari	1:21.85
6	(United States) Mario Andretti	Lotus-Ford	1:21.88
7	(Italy) Vittorio Brambilla	March-Ford	1:21.88
8	(South Africa) Jody Scheckter	Tyrrell-Ford	1:21.91
9	(Brazil) Carlos Pace	Brabham-Alfa Romeo	1:22.03
10	(France) Jacques Laffite	Ligier-Matra	1:22.06
11	(Belgium) Jacky Ickx	Ensign-Ford	1:22.13
12	(Argentina) Carlos Reutemann	Brabham-Alfa Romeo	1:22.16
13	(Sweden) Gunnar Nilsson	Lotus-Ford	1:22.16
14	(France) Patrick Depailler	Tyrrell-Ford	1:22.27
15	(Germany) Jochen Mass	McLaren-Ford	1:22.48
16	(Australia) Alan Jones	Surtees-Ford	1:22.51
17	(Brazil) Emerson Fittipaldi	Copersucar-Ford	1:22.55
18	(Germany) Hans-Joachim Stuck	March-Ford	1:22.59
19	(Australia) Larry Perkins	Boro-Ford	1:23.10
20	(France) Jean-Pierre Jarier	Shadow-Ford	1:23.18
21	(Netherlands) Boy Hayje	Penske-Ford	1:23.26
22	(France) Henri Pescarolo	Surtees-Ford	1:23.55
23	(Italy) Arturo Merzario	Williams-Ford	1:24.09
24	(Austria) Harald Ertl	Hesketh-Ford	1:24.37
25	(Germany) Rolf Stommelen	Hesketh-Ford	1:24.71
26	(Sweden) Conny Andersson	Surtees-Ford	1:24.74
DNQ	(Italy) Alessandro Pesenti-Rossi	Tyrrell-Ford	1:26.01

== Race ==
=== Race classification ===
Pos	No	Driver	Constructor	Laps	Time/Retired	Grid	Points
1	11	(United Kingdom) James Hunt	McLaren-Ford	75	1:44:52.09	2	9
2	2	(Switzerland) Clay Regazzoni	Ferrari	75	+0.92	5	6
3	5	(United States) Mario Andretti	Lotus-Ford	75	+2.09	6	4
4	16	(United Kingdom) Tom Pryce	Shadow-Ford	75	+6.94	3	3
5	3	(South Africa) Jody Scheckter	Tyrrell-Ford	75	+22.46	8	2
6	9	(Italy) Vittorio Brambilla	March-Ford	75	+45.03	7	1
7	4	(France) Patrick Depailler	Tyrrell-Ford	75	+56.28	14	
8	19	(Australia) Alan Jones	Surtees-Ford	74	+1 lap	16	
9	12	(West Germany) Jochen Mass	McLaren-Ford	74	+1 lap	15	
10	17	(France) Jean-Pierre Jarier	Shadow-Ford	74	+1 lap	20	
11	38	(France) Henri Pescarolo	Surtees-Ford	74	+1 lap	22	
12	25	(Germany) Rolf Stommelen	Hesketh-Ford	72	+3 laps	25	
Ret	22	(Belgium) Jacky Ickx	Ensign-Ford	66	Electrical	11	
Ret	39	(Netherlands) Boy Hayje	Penske-Ford	63	Halfshaft	21	
Ret	8	(Brazil) Carlos Pace	Brabham-Alfa Romeo	53	Oil leak	9	
Ret	26	(France) Jacques Laffite	Ligier-Matra	53	Oil leak	10	
Ret	10	(Sweden) Ronnie Peterson	March-Ford	52	Oil pressure	1	
Ret	24	(Austria) Harald Ertl	Hesketh-Ford	49	Spun off	24	
Ret	28	(United Kingdom) John Watson	Penske-Ford	47	Gearbox	4	
Ret	27	(Australia) Larry Perkins	Boro-Ford	44	Accident	19	
Ret	30	(Brazil) Emerson Fittipaldi	Fittipaldi-Ford	40	Electrical	17	
Ret	7	(Argentina) Carlos Reutemann	Brabham-Alfa Romeo	11	Clutch	12	
Ret	6	(Sweden) Gunnar Nilsson	Lotus-Ford	10	Accident	13	
Ret	34	(West Germany) Hans Joachim Stuck	March-Ford	9	Engine	18	
Ret	18	(Sweden) Conny Andersson	Surtees-Ford	9	Engine	26	
Ret	20	(Italy) Arturo Merzario	Wolf-Williams-Ford	5	Accident	23	

== Notes ==
- This was the Formula One World Championship debut for Swedish driver Conny Andersson and Dutch driver Boy Hayje.
- This race marked the 100th podium finish for an American driver.
- This was the 10th Grand Prix start for Wolf-Williams.
- This race saw the 5th pole position for a March.

== Championship standings after the race ==
Drivers' Championship standings

	Pos	Driver	Points
	1	(Austria) Niki Lauda*	58
	2	(United Kingdom) James Hunt*	56
	3	(South Africa) Jody Scheckter*	36
	4	(France) Patrick Depailler*	26
1	5	(Switzerland) Clay Regazzoni	22

Constructors' Championship standings

Pos	Constructor	Points
1	(Italy) Ferrari*	67
2	(United Kingdom) McLaren-Ford*	61 (62)
3	(United Kingdom) Tyrrell-Ford*	49
4	(United States) Penske-Ford	18
5	(France) Ligier-Matra	16

- Note: Only the top five positions are included for both sets of standings. Only the best 7 results from the first 8 races and the best 7 results from the last 8 races counted towards the championship. Numbers without parentheses are championship points; numbers in parentheses are total points scored. Points do not reflect final results of 1976 British Grand Prix as it was under appeal.

Previous race: 1976 Austrian Grand Prix	FIA Formula One World Championship; 1976 season	Next race: 1976 Italian Grand Prix
Previous race: 1975 Dutch Grand Prix	Dutch Grand Prix	Next race: 1977 Dutch Grand Prix
Previous race: 1975 Austrian Grand Prix	European Grand Prix (Designated European Grand Prix)	Next race: 1977 British Grand Prix
