= 1976 United States Grand Prix =

Race 15 of 16 in the 1976 Formula One season
← Previous race	Next race →
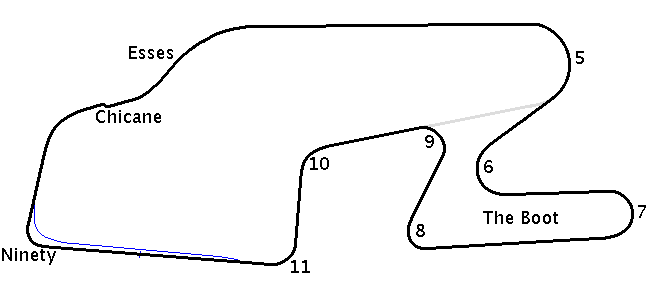

Race details
- Date: October 10, 1976
- Official name: XIX Grand Prix of the United States
- Location: Watkins Glen Grand Prix Race Course; Watkins Glen, New York
- Course: Permanent road course
- Course length: 5.435 km (3.377 miles)
- Distance: 59 laps, 320.67 km (199.24 miles)
- Weather: Sunny with temperatures reaching up to 16 °C (61 °F); Winds gusting up to 44.45 km/h (27.62 mph)

Pole position
Driver	(United Kingdom) James Hunt	McLaren-Ford
- Time: 1:43.622

Fastest lap
Driver	(United Kingdom) James Hunt	McLaren-Ford
- Time: 1:42.851 on lap 53

Podium
First	(United Kingdom) James Hunt	McLaren-Ford
Second	(South Africa) Jody Scheckter	Tyrrell-Ford
Third	(Austria) Niki Lauda	Ferrari

The 1976 United States Grand Prix was a Formula One motor race held on October 10, 1976, at the Watkins Glen Grand Prix Race Course in Watkins Glen, New York. This event was also referred to as the United States Grand Prix East in order to distinguish it from the United States Grand Prix West held on March 28, 1976, in Long Beach, California.

== Summary ==
Austrian Niki Lauda arrived in the United States for the penultimate race of 1976 with an eight-point lead over Britain's James Hunt in the driver's championship. Lauda had led comfortably with five wins in the season's first nine races, before his life-threatening crash at the Nürburgring in August. Hunt then won three of the next five races, including Germany where Lauda was injured. Lauda recovered to race in Italy and Canada (won by Hunt), but his lead over Hunt in the driver's championship had narrowed considerably.

Friday's first qualifying session saw only a handful of drivers venture out onto a wet race track. When Austrian Otto Stuppacher went out first, there were still streams of water running across in places. McLaren manager Teddy Mayer remarked, "The drivers finished in reverse ratio to the proportion of their IQs."

The rain stopped before the afternoon session began, and after 15 minutes on the still wet track, drivers began changing to slicks. Times dropped quickly on the drying track as driver after driver jumped to the top of the charts, only to fall back down again as the others went faster, too.

Hunt and Patrick Depailler, who was driving one of the six-wheeled Tyrrells, were dueling for top spot, with Depailler following Hunt's McLaren on the track, when the air bottle for the McLaren's compressor starter fell off and hit the Tyrrell's two left front wheels and the monocoque. Both wheels were broken, and even after stopping to replace them, Depailler's steering was out of line, and he could manage only seventh quickest. Later, as Hunt stood in the pits next to a four-foot, 150-pound air bottle, Rob Walker asked, "Was that the one you threw at Depailler?" Hunt answered, "No, we are keeping that one for Niki on Sunday!"

Hunt finished Friday on pole, ahead of Jody Scheckter's Tyrrell, the Marches of Ronnie Peterson and Vittorio Brambilla, and Lauda's Ferrari. Saturday's rain was worse than Friday morning's had been, so the times from Friday afternoon made up the grid. Stuppacher was the only one who failed to qualify.

Overnight, snow fell on the circuit, but the sun came out on Sunday as 100,000 fans, the largest paying crowd ever at The Glen, came out to see the championship battle. At the start, Scheckter jumped ahead of Hunt and led into the first turn. They were followed by Brambilla, Peterson, Lauda, Depailler, John Watson's Penske, the Lotus of Mario Andretti and Jacques Laffite's Ligier.

Scheckter and Hunt began to draw away immediately, with the Tyrrell 2.5 seconds ahead after five laps. After being held up by Brambilla for four laps, Lauda moved into third, 5.8 seconds behind Hunt. Meanwhile, a battle was being waged for fourth among Brambilla, Peterson, Laffite, Carlos Pace, Watson, Clay Regazzoni, Andretti and Jochen Mass. Hans-Joachim Stuck, who had qualified sixth but suffered a slipping clutch on the grid, was working his way forward and had now reached the end of this group.

Further down, on lap 15, the Ensign of Jacky Ickx went wide in Turn 6, a left-hander entering the 'Anvil' section of the course (known among spectators as 'The Boot'). The car suddenly snapped right and hit the Armco barrier head on. The nose went under the bottom rail, and the car split in two with the rear section spinning back onto the track in flames. Ickx stepped out of the wreckage of the cockpit and hobbled to the grass, where he collapsed with injuries to both his legs and ankles. Emerson Fittipaldi, who had been following him, said it was one of the worst accidents he had ever seen, and that he could hear the explosion of the car hitting the barrier above his engine and through his helmet and earplugs. Watson slowed briefly for the wreck, and was passed by Regazzoni and Mass before he got back up to full speed, putting him back to ninth place.

At the front, Scheckter's Tyrrell was losing grip as his fuel load lightened, and Hunt was getting quicker in the chasing McLaren. The gap closed to 1.3 seconds on lap 29, then half a second on lap 30. Finally, on lap 37, Hunt moved inside at the end of the back straight and took the lead. He pulled away by over two seconds in the next two laps, but on lap 41, he missed a gear in the chicane while trying to get around some backmarkers, and Scheckter retook the lead. Hunt passed him again at the end of the straight on lap 46 and held on to claim his sixth win of the season. Six laps from the finish, on lap 53, Hunt set the fastest lap of the race.

Lauda, struggling with oversteer on hard tires in the cold, barely beat Hunt's McLaren teammate Mass to the line to keep his third place. After the race, the Austrian removed his helmet to reveal a balaclava soaked in blood. He claimed four Championship points and still led by three points with one race to go. Lauda's third place clinched the Constructor's Championship for Ferrari with one race left.

== Qualifying ==
Pos	No.	Driver	Constructor	Lap	Gap
1	11	(United Kingdom) James Hunt	McLaren-Ford	1:43.622	—
2	3	(South Africa) Jody Scheckter	Tyrrell-Ford	1:43.870	+ 0.248
3	10	(Sweden) Ronnie Peterson	March-Ford	1:43.941	+ 0.319
4	9	(Italy) Vittorio Brambilla	March-Ford	1:44.250	+ 0.628
5	1	(Austria) Niki Lauda	Ferrari	1:44.257	+ 0.635
6	34	(West Germany) Hans-Joachim Stuck	March-Ford	1:44.265	+ 0.643
7	4	(France) Patrick Depailler	Tyrrell-Ford	1:44.516	+ 0.894
8	28	(United Kingdom) John Watson	Penske-Ford	1:44.719	+ 1.097
9	16	(United Kingdom) Tom Pryce	Shadow-Ford	1:45.102	+ 1.480
10	8	(Brazil) Carlos Pace	Brabham-Alfa Romeo	1:45.274	+ 1.652
11	5	(United States) Mario Andretti	Lotus-Ford	1:45.311	+ 1.689
12	26	(France) Jacques Laffite	Ligier-Matra	1:45.324	+ 1.702
13	7	(Australia) Larry Perkins	Brabham-Alfa Romeo	1:45.363	+ 1.741
14	2	(Switzerland) Clay Regazzoni	Ferrari	1:45.534	+ 1.912
15	30	(Brazil) Emerson Fittipaldi	Fittipaldi-Ford	1:45.646	+ 2.024
16	17	(France) Jean-Pierre Jarier	Shadow-Ford	1:45.979	+ 2.357
17	12	(West Germany) Jochen Mass	McLaren-Ford	1:46.067	+ 2.445
18	19	(Australia) Alan Jones	Surtees-Ford	1:46.402	+ 2.780
19	22	(Belgium) Jacky Ickx	Ensign-Ford	1:46.605	+ 2.983
20	6	(Sweden) Gunnar Nilsson	Lotus-Ford	1:46.776	+ 3.154
21	24	(Austria) Harald Ertl	Hesketh-Ford	1:49.418	+ 5.796
22	25	(Brazil) Alex Ribeiro	Hesketh-Ford	1:49.669	+ 6.047
23	21	(Australia) Warwick Brown	Wolf-Williams-Ford	1:51.124	+ 7.502
24	18	(United States) Brett Lunger	Surtees-Ford	1:51.373	+ 7.751
25	20	(Italy) Arturo Merzario	Wolf-Williams-Ford	2:00.932	+ 17.310
26	38	(France) Henri Pescarolo	Surtees-Ford	2:05.211	+ 21.589
27	39	(Austria) Otto Stuppacher	Tyrrell-Ford	2:11.070	+ 27.448

== Race ==
Pos	No	Driver	Constructor	Laps	Time/Retired	Grid	Points
1	11	(United Kingdom) James Hunt	McLaren-Ford	59	1:42:40.742	1	9
2	3	(South Africa) Jody Scheckter	Tyrrell-Ford	59	+ 8.030	2	6
3	1	(Austria) Niki Lauda	Ferrari	59	+ 1:02.324	5	4
4	12	(West Germany) Jochen Mass	McLaren-Ford	59	+ 1:02.458	17	3
5	34	(West Germany) Hans-Joachim Stuck	March-Ford	59	+ 1:07.978	6	2
6	28	(United Kingdom) John Watson	Penske-Ford	59	+ 1:08.190	8	1
7	2	(Switzerland) Clay Regazzoni	Ferrari	58	+ 1 Lap	14	
8	19	(Australia) Alan Jones	Surtees-Ford	58	+ 1 Lap	18	
9	30	(Brazil) Emerson Fittipaldi	Fittipaldi-Ford	57	+ 2 Laps	15	
10	17	(France) Jean-Pierre Jarier	Shadow-Ford	57	+ 2 Laps	16	
11	18	(United States) Brett Lunger	Surtees-Ford	57	+ 2 Laps	24	
12	25	(Brazil) Alex Ribeiro	Hesketh-Ford	57	+ 2 Laps	22	
13	24	(Austria) Harald Ertl	Hesketh-Ford	54	+ 5 Laps	21	
14	21	(Australia) Warwick Brown	Wolf-Williams-Ford	54	+ 5 Laps	23	
NC	38	(France) Henri Pescarolo	Surtees-Ford	48	+ 11 Laps	26	
Ret	16	(United Kingdom) Tom Pryce	Shadow-Ford	45	Engine	9	
Ret	9	(Italy) Vittorio Brambilla	March-Ford	34	Tyre	4	
Ret	26	(France) Jacques Laffite	Ligier-Matra	34	Tyre	12	
Ret	8	(Brazil) Carlos Pace	Brabham-Alfa Romeo	31	Collision	10	
Ret	7	(Australia) Larry Perkins	Brabham-Alfa Romeo	30	Suspension	13	
Ret	5	(United States) Mario Andretti	Lotus-Ford	23	Suspension	11	
Ret	22	(Belgium) Jacky Ickx	Ensign-Ford	14	Accident	19	
Ret	6	(Sweden) Gunnar Nilsson	Lotus-Ford	13	Engine	20	
Ret	10	(Sweden) Ronnie Peterson	March-Ford	12	Suspension	3	
Ret	20	(Italy) Arturo Merzario	Wolf-Williams-Ford	9	Accident	25	
Ret	4	(France) Patrick Depailler	Tyrrell-Ford	7	Fuel Pipe	7	
DNQ	39	(Austria) Otto Stuppacher	Tyrrell-Ford			-	

== Notes ==
- This was the Formula One World Championship debut for Australian driver Warwick Brown and Brazilian driver Alex Ribeiro.
- This was the 1st Grand Slam for McLaren and the 10th for a Ford-powered car.

== Championship standings after the race ==
Drivers' Championship standings

Pos	Driver	Points
1	(Austria) **Niki Lauda***	68
2	(United Kingdom) **James Hunt***	65
3	(South Africa) Jody Scheckter	49
4	(France) Patrick Depailler	33
5	(Switzerland) Clay Regazzoni	29

Constructors' Championship standings

	Pos	Constructor	Points
	1	(Italy) **Ferrari**	81
	2	(United Kingdom) McLaren-Ford	70 (71)
	3	(United Kingdom) Tyrrell-Ford	65
2	4	(United States) Penske-Ford	20
1	5	(France) Ligier-Matra	20

- Note: Only the top five positions are included for both sets of standings. Only the best 7 results from the first 8 races and the best 7 results from the last 8 races counted towards the Championship. Numbers without parentheses are Championship points; numbers in parentheses are total points scored.
- **Bold text** indicates the 1976 World Constructors' Champions.
- Competitors in bold and marked with an asterisk still had a theoretical chance of becoming World Champion.

Previous race: 1976 Canadian Grand Prix	FIA Formula One World Championship; 1976 season	Next race: 1976 Japanese Grand Prix
Previous race: 1975 United States Grand Prix	United States Grand Prix	Next race: 1977 United States Grand Prix
