= 1976 Canadian Grand Prix =

Race 14 of 16 in the 1976 Formula One season
← Previous race	Next race →

Race details
- Date: 3 October 1976
- Official name: XV Labatt's Canadian Grand Prix
- Location: Mosport International Raceway, Ontario, Canada
- Course: Permanent racing facility
- Course length: 3.957 km (2.458 miles)
- Distance: 80 laps, 316.56 km (196.64 miles)
- Weather: Mild with temperatures approaching 22 °C (72 °F); wind speeds up to 8.9 kilometres per hour (5.5 mph)

Pole position
Driver	(United Kingdom) James Hunt	McLaren-Ford
- Time: 1:12.389

Fastest lap
Driver	(France) Patrick Depailler	Tyrrell-Ford
- Time: 1:13.817 on lap 60

Podium
First	(United Kingdom) James Hunt	McLaren-Ford
Second	(France) Patrick Depailler	Tyrrell-Ford
Third	(United States) Mario Andretti	Lotus-Ford

The 1976 Canadian Grand Prix was a Formula One motor race held at Mosport Park on 3 October 1976.

At this weekend, British championship contender James Hunt found out that he lost 9 points from his victory at the British Grand Prix that year, and Austrian championship leader Niki Lauda gained another 3 points (he finished 2nd at that race). Hunt won the Mosport event, but it made no difference to his championship points standings before the race.

== Qualifying ==
James Hunt managed to take pole position from the March cars of Ronnie Peterson and Vittorio Brambilla, whilst the rest of the top 10 qualifiers were Patrick Depailler, Mario Andretti, Niki Lauda, Jody Scheckter, Hans Joachim Stuck, Jacques Laffite and Carlos Pace in the leading Brabham.

=== Qualifying classification ===
Pos	No.	Driver	Constructor	Lap	Gap
1	11	(United Kingdom) James Hunt	McLaren-Ford	1:12.389	—
2	10	(Sweden) Ronnie Peterson	March-Ford	1:12.783	+ 0.394
3	9	(Italy) Vittorio Brambilla	March-Ford	1:12.799	+ 0.410
4	4	(France) Patrick Depailler	Tyrrell-Ford	1:12.837	+ 0.448
5	5	(United States) Mario Andretti	Lotus-Ford	1:13.028	+ 0.639
6	1	(Austria) Niki Lauda	Ferrari	1:13.060	+ 0.671
7	3	(South Africa) Jody Scheckter	Tyrrell-Ford	1:13.191	+ 0.802
8	34	(Germany) Hans Joachim Stuck	March-Ford	1:13.322	+ 0.933
9	26	(France) Jacques Laffite	Ligier-Matra	1:13.425	+ 1.036
10	8	(Brazil) Carlos Pace	Brabham-Alfa Romeo	1:13.438	+ 1.049
11	12	(West Germany) Jochen Mass	McLaren-Ford	1:13.439	+ 1.050
12	2	(Switzerland) Clay Regazzoni	Ferrari	1:13.500	+ 1.111
13	16	(United Kingdom) Tom Pryce	Shadow-Ford	1:13.665	+ 1.276
14	28	(United Kingdom) John Watson	Penske-Ford	1:13.973	+ 1.584
15	6	(Sweden) Gunnar Nilsson	Lotus-Ford	1:14.397	+ 2.008
16	22	(Belgium) Jacky Ickx	Ensign-Ford	1:14.461	+ 2.072
17	30	(Brazil) Emerson Fittipaldi	Fittipaldi-Ford	1:14.471	+ 2.082
18	17	(France) Jean-Pierre Jarier	Shadow-Ford	1:15.113	+ 2.724
19	7	(Australia) Larry Perkins	Brabham-Alfa Romeo	1:15.598	+ 3.209
20	19	(Australia) Alan Jones	Surtees-Ford	1:15.652	+ 3.263
21	38	(France) Henri Pescarolo	Surtees-Ford	1:15.846	+ 3.457
22	18	(United States) Brett Lunger	Surtees-Ford	1:16.201	+ 3.812
23	24	(Austria) Harald Ertl	Hesketh-Ford	1:16.534	+ 4.145
24	25	(United Kingdom) Guy Edwards	Hesketh-Ford	1:17.217	+ 4.828
25	20	(Italy) Arturo Merzario	Wolf-Williams-Ford	1:17.288	+ 4.899
26	21	(New Zealand) Chris Amon	Wolf-Williams-Ford	1:18.202	+ 5.813
27	39	(Austria) Otto Stuppacher	Tyrrell-Ford	1:25.024	+ 12.695

== Race ==
James Hunt started from pole position but as ever, he didn't get away well off the start and allowed Peterson and in the March to take first ahead of Hunt and teammate Brambilla for the early stages. That was until Hunt retook the lead on lap 10, whilst Peterson and Brambilla fell out of the points later on. As Depailler took second for Tyrrell and Andretti was third in the leading Lotus. The order of the top 3 didn't change whilst Hunt's rival Lauda who was running 5th for most of the race had also dropped out of the points with the Marches due to handling problems, he would eventually finished 8th as a result. James Hunt had won the race ahead of Patrick Depailler, Mario Andretti, Jody Scheckter, Jochen Mass and Clay Regazzoni. Which closed the gap from 17 back to 8 points in the championship, but Hunt was still slightly furious over his disqualification from the British Grand Prix after the race.

=== Classification ===
Pos	No	Driver	Constructor	Laps	Time/Retired	Grid	Points
1	11	(United Kingdom) James Hunt	McLaren-Ford	80	1:40:09.626	1	9
2	4	(France) Patrick Depailler	Tyrrell-Ford	80	+ 6.331	4	6
3	5	(United States) Mario Andretti	Lotus-Ford	80	+ 10.366	5	4
4	3	(South Africa) Jody Scheckter	Tyrrell-Ford	80	+ 19.745	7	3
5	12	(Germany) Jochen Mass	McLaren-Ford	80	+ 41.811	11	2
6	2	(Switzerland) Clay Regazzoni	Ferrari	80	+ 46.256	12	1
7	8	(Brazil) Carlos Pace	Brabham-Alfa Romeo	80	+ 46.472	10	
8	1	(Austria) Niki Lauda	Ferrari	80	+ 1:12.957	6	
9	10	(Sweden) Ronnie Peterson	March-Ford	79	+ 1 lap	2	
10	28	(United Kingdom) John Watson	Penske-Ford	79	+ 1 lap	14	
11	16	(United Kingdom) Tom Pryce	Shadow-Ford	79	+ 1 lap	13	
12	6	(Sweden) Gunnar Nilsson	Lotus-Ford	79	+ 1 lap	PL	
13	22	(Belgium) Jacky Ickx	Ensign-Ford	79	+ 1 lap	16	
14	9	(Italy) Vittorio Brambilla	March-Ford	79	+ 1 lap	3	
15	18	(United States) Brett Lunger	Surtees-Ford	78	+ 2 laps	22	
16	19	(Australia) Alan Jones	Surtees-Ford	78	+ 2 laps	20	
17	7	(Australia) Larry Perkins	Brabham-Alfa Romeo	78	+ 2 laps	19	
18	17	(France) Jean-Pierre Jarier	Shadow-Ford	77	+ 3 laps	18	
19	38	(France) Henri Pescarolo	Surtees-Ford	77	+ 3 laps	21	
20	25	(United Kingdom) Guy Edwards	Hesketh-Ford	75	+ 5 laps	23	
Ret	26	(France) Jacques Laffite	Ligier-Matra	43	Oil pressure	9	
Ret	30	(Brazil) Emerson Fittipaldi	Fittipaldi-Ford	41	Exhaust	17	
Ret	34	(Germany) Hans Joachim Stuck	March-Ford	36	Handling	8	
Ret	20	(Italy) Arturo Merzario	Wolf-Williams-Ford	11	Accident	24	
DNS	24	(Austria) Harald Ertl	Hesketh-Ford		Practice accident		
DNS	21	(New Zealand) Chris Amon	Wolf-Williams-Ford		Practice accident		
DNQ	39	(Austria) Otto Stuppacher	Tyrrell-Ford				

== Championship standings after the race ==
Drivers' Championship standings

	Pos	Driver	Points
	1	(Austria) **Niki Lauda***	64
	2	(United Kingdom) **James Hunt***	56
	3	(South Africa) Jody Scheckter	43
1	4	(France) Patrick Depailler	33
1	5	(Switzerland) Clay Regazzoni	29

Constructors' Championship standings

	Pos	Constructor	Points
	1	(Italy) **Ferrari***	77
	2	(United Kingdom) **McLaren-Ford***	61 (62)
	3	(United Kingdom) Tyrrell-Ford	59
	4	(France) Ligier-Matra	20
2	5	(United Kingdom) Lotus-Ford	20

- Note: Only the top five positions are included for both sets of standings. Only the best 7 results from the first 8 races and the best 7 results from the last 8 races counted towards the Championship. Numbers without parentheses are Championship points; numbers in parentheses are total points scored.
- Competitors in bold and marked with an asterisk still had a theoretical chance of becoming World Champion.

Previous race: 1976 Italian Grand Prix	FIA Formula One World Championship; 1976 season	Next race: 1976 United States Grand Prix
Previous race: 1974 Canadian Grand Prix	Canadian Grand Prix	Next race: 1977 Canadian Grand Prix
