= Hesketh 308C =

Formula One motor racing car

Hesketh 308C Wolf–Williams FW05
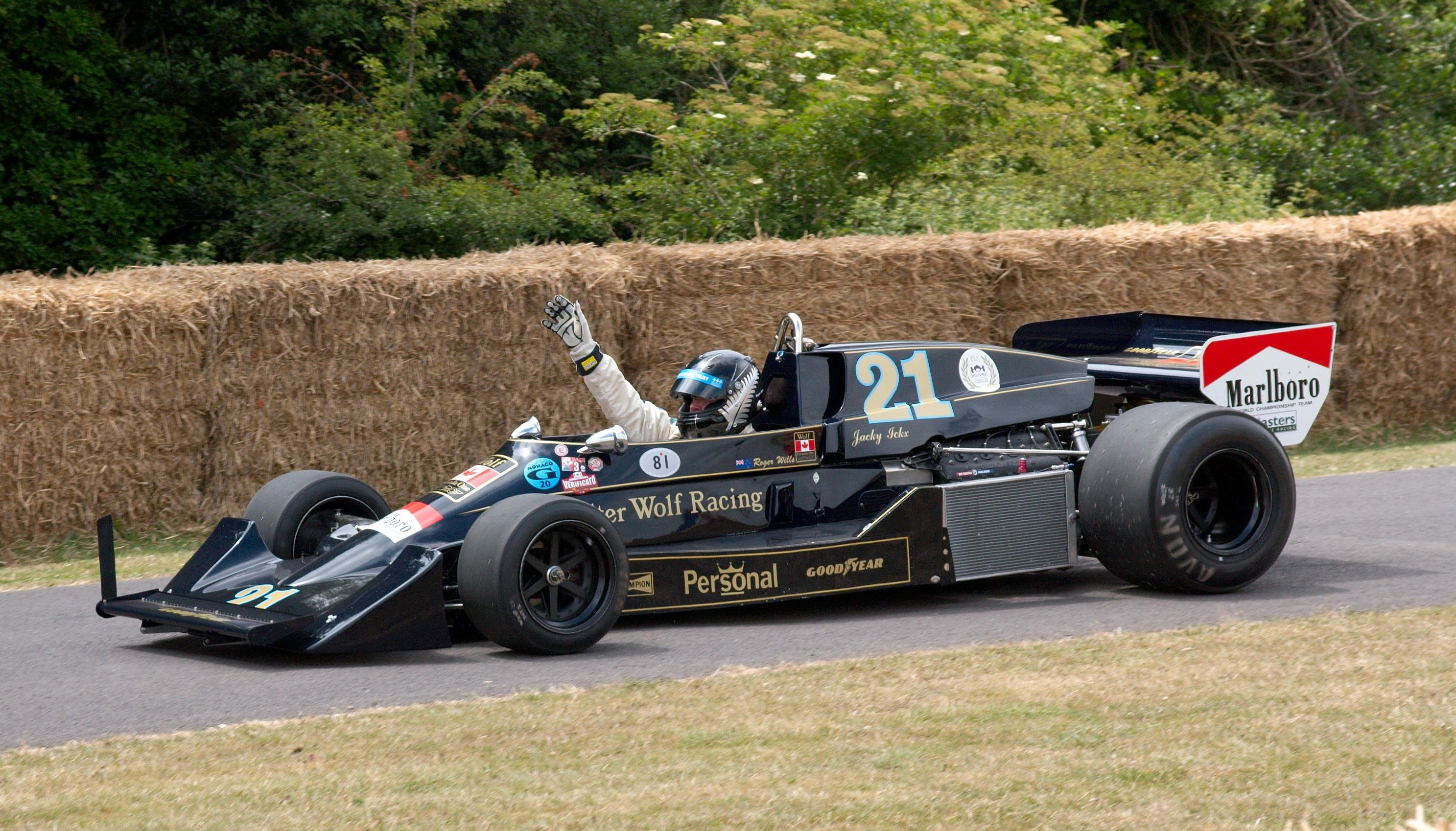
- Wolf–Williams FW05 at Goodwood in 2010
- Category: Formula One
- Constructor: Hesketh/Wolf–Williams
- Designer: Harvey Postlethwaite
- Predecessor: Hesketh 308B (Hesketh); Wolf–Williams FW04 (Wolf–Williams)
- Successor: Hesketh 308D

Technical specifications
- Chassis: Aluminium monocoque, with engine as a fully stressed member.
- Suspension (front): 1975: lower wishbones, top rockers, in-board rubber springs over dampers, anti-roll bar. 1976: lower wishbones, top rockers, in-board coil springs over dampers, anti-roll bar
- Suspension (rear): 1975: single top links, double lower links, twin radius arms, rubber springs over dampers, anti-roll bar. 1976: single top links, double lower links, twin radius arms, coil springs over dampers, anti-roll bar
- Engine: Ford Cosworth DFV 2,993 cc (182.6 cu in) 90° V8, naturally aspirated, mid-mounted.
- Transmission: 1975: Hewland FGA 400 5-speed manual 1976: Hewland DG 400 5-speed manual
- Weight: 1975: 580 kg (1,280 lb); 1976: 595 kg (1,312 lb)
- Fuel: Duckhams (1975); FINA (1976)
- Lubricants: Duckhams (1975); FINA (1976)
- Tyres: Goodyear

Competition history
- Notable entrants: Hesketh Racing; Wolf–Williams Racing
- Notable drivers: (United Kingdom) James Hunt (Belgium) Jacky Ickx (France) Michel Leclère (Italy) Arturo Merzario
- Debut: 1975 Italian Grand Prix
Races	Wins	Poles	F/Laps
18	0	0	0
- Unless otherwise stated, all data refer to Formula One World Championship Grands Prix only.

The Hesketh 308C was a Formula One racing car designed by Harvey Postlethwaite and used by Hesketh Racing in the latter stages of the 1975 Formula One season. The car featured the rubber suspension which Postlethwaite had pioneered on the preceding 308B model and a Ford-Cosworth DFV engine. In 1976, the car was acquired by Wolf–Williams Racing and rebranded as the Wolf–Williams FW05.

== Racing history ==
=== Hesketh 308C ===
The 308C wasn't seen until the latter part of the 1975 season. Like the 308B on which it was based, the 308C was very narrow at the front, tapering out to wide and low sidepods, with the main radiators in front of the rear wheels. The rubber suspension was inboard, and operated by rocker arms. It was entered by Hesketh Racing for Englishman James Hunt to drive. The 308C made its debut at the Italian Grand Prix and Hunt finished fifth. For the final race of the 1975 season, in the United States the Englishman finished fourth.

=== Wolf–Williams FW05 ===
Before the start of the 1976 season, Canadian oil millionaire Walter Wolf bought 60% of Frank Williams Racing Cars and the team became Wolf–Williams Racing. However, Frank Williams was retained as team manager. soon afterwards Dr. Harvey Postlethwaite arrived as chief engineer. Simultaneously Wolf bought the assets of the Hesketh team that had recently withdrawn from F1.

The team was based in the Williams facility at Reading but used most of the cars and equipment once owned by Hesketh Racing. The team inherited the Hesketh 308C car used by Hesketh Racing during the final races of 1975, rebranding it as the Wolf–Williams FW05 and the Williams FW04 was similarly rebranded as the Wolf–Williams FW04, although it was only used in the opening race of the season, the 1976 Brazilian Grand Prix.

The team had two new drivers, for Brazil Italian Renzo Zorzi drove the FW04 and Belgian Jacky Ickx drove the FW05. Zorzi outqualified Ickx (17th and 19th), and both cars finished the race with Ickx eighth and Zorzi ninth. After this race, Wolf–Williams had two FW05s at their disposal and so the FW04 was put aside.

However, Zorzi was replaced by Frenchman Michel Leclère for the remaining first half of the season because the Italian's sponsorship funds ran out. At South Africa the Belgian outqualified the Frenchman (19th and 22nd), and both cars finished the race with the Frenchman 13th eighth and the Belgian 16th. Both Drivers failed to qualify for the United States Grand Prix West because the Formula One Constructors Association had decided to limit the field to twenty starters for safety reasons, because of the narrow concrete canyons necessitated by the street layout.

At Spain Ickx outqualified Leclère (21st and 23rd), and both cars finished the race with Ickx seventh eighth and Leclère tenth. The Belgian failed to qualify for his home race, the Belgian Grand Prix and the Frenchman qualified 25th and finished 11th. Ickx failed to qualify for Monaco and Leclère qualified 18th and finished 11th, Wolf–Williams had only one car for the Swedish Grand Prix as Ickx was busy winning the 24 Hours of Le Mans with Gijs van Lennep in a Porsche 936, The Frenchman qualified 25th and retired with engine failure. Ickx returned for the French Grand Prix and outqualified Leclère (19th and 22nd), and both cars finished the race with Ickx tenth eighth and Leclère 13th.

Wolf–Williams had reduced their efforts to one car for Britain because Leclère left the team, Ickx failed to qualify and was fired after the race.

Ickx was replaced by Italian Arturo Merzario and the team still only had one car, The German Grand Prix saw Merzario qualify 21st and the race was red flag on the second lap because Brett Lunger's Surtees and Harald Ertl's Hesketh both hit Niki Lauda's Ferrari. Guy Edwards's Hesketh managed to avoid the Ferrari. All three drivers stopped and tried to get Lauda out of the flames and they were joined by Merzario, who stopped the Wolf–Williams after seeing the wreck. The Italian managed to make the restart but retired on lap three because of brake failure. Merzario retired in Austria and Holland with crashes.

The Italian Grand Prix qualifying session on Friday was wet, so the dry session on Saturday was to provide the field with their best times. After this session, Brett Lunger's Surtees, Merzario and Otto Stuppacher's privately entered Tyrrell had failed to qualify. John Watson's Penske and the McLaren's of James Hunt and Jochen Mass qualified in eighth ninth and tenth positions, but their times were later disallowed due to fuel irregularities.

This meant that their Friday times counted for their grid positions. As a result, these three drivers were the three slowest and were deemed not to have qualified, allowing Lunger, Merzario and Stuppacher on to the grid. Stuppacher had already left the circuit and flown back home to Austria, so could not take his place on the grid. This promoted Hunt back into the 26 qualifiers. Merzario withdrew due to brake problems) and promoted Mass, and later Guy Edwards Hesketh also decided to withdraw in order to let Watson race.

For Canadian Grand Prix Wolf–Williams turned up with New Zealander Chris Amon in a second car but after a spin he was hit by Harald Ertl's Hesketh and both cars seriously damaged. Amon suffered bruising to his legs and choose not to take part in the race and the Italian qualified 24th and retired with a crash.

Amon was replaced by Australian Warwick Brown for the United States Grand Prix East, He qualified 23rd and finished 14th, Merzario qualified 25th and retired with a crash.

For the final race of the 1976 season in Japan, Brown was replaced by local driver Masami Kuwashima. He took part in the first two qualifying sessions for the race, but was the slowest runner except for the Maki of Tony Trimmer. In any case, later that day Kuwashima's sponsors withdrew their financing of the Wolf–Williams deal, and Frank Williams promptly replaced him with Austrian Hans Binder for the third practice session and the race itself. Merzario qualified 19th and Binder was allowed to start 25th after Williams asked for permission from the other teams. Both men retired in the race; Merzario with a broken gearbox and Binder with a wheel bearing failure. However the problem with the FW05 was the car turned out to be overweight.

At season's end, Wolf decided to restructure the team, removing Frank Williams from the manager's job. Disillusioned, Williams left the team altogether, to set up Williams Grand Prix Engineering with Patrick Head in 1977. Wolf brought 100% of Wolf–Williams Racing after buying the 40% share from Williams and the team became Walter Wolf Racing.

== Complete Formula One World Championship results ==
(key)

Year	Entrant	Chassis	Engine	Tyres	Drivers	1	2	3	4	5	6	7	8	9	10	11	12	13	14	15	16	WCC	Points
1975	Hesketh Racing	Hesketh 308C	Ford Cosworth DFV 3.0 V8	G		ARG	BRA	RSA	ESP	MON	BEL	SWE	NED	FRA	GBR	GER	AUT	ITA	USA			4th*	33*
1975	Hesketh Racing	Hesketh 308C	Ford Cosworth DFV 3.0 V8	G	James Hunt													5	4			4th*	33*
1976	Wolf–Williams Racing	Wolf–Williams FW05	Ford Cosworth DFV 3.0 V8	G		BRA	RSA	USW	ESP	BEL	MON	SWE	FRA	GBR	GER	AUT	NED	ITA	CAN	USE	JPN	—	0
1976	Wolf–Williams Racing	Wolf–Williams FW05	Ford Cosworth DFV 3.0 V8	G	Jacky Ickx	8	16	DNQ	7	DNQ	DNQ		10	DNQ								—	0
1976	Wolf–Williams Racing	Wolf–Williams FW05	Ford Cosworth DFV 3.0 V8	G	Michel Leclère		13	DNQ	10	11	11	Ret	13									—	0
1976	Wolf–Williams Racing	Wolf–Williams FW05	Ford Cosworth DFV 3.0 V8	G	Arturo Merzario										Ret	Ret	Ret	DNS	Ret	Ret	Ret	—	0
1976	Wolf–Williams Racing	Wolf–Williams FW05	Ford Cosworth DFV 3.0 V8	G	Chris Amon														DNS			—	0
1976	Wolf–Williams Racing	Wolf–Williams FW05	Ford Cosworth DFV 3.0 V8	G	Warwick Brown															14		—	0
1976	Wolf–Williams Racing	Wolf–Williams FW05	Ford Cosworth DFV 3.0 V8	G	Masami Kuwashima																DNS	—	0
1976	Wolf–Williams Racing	Wolf–Williams FW05	Ford Cosworth DFV 3.0 V8	G	Hans Binder																Ret	—	0

* 5 points scored with the 308C; remaining points scored with the 308B

== Non-championship results ==
(key)

Year	Entrant	Chassis	Engine	Tyres	Drivers	1	2	3
1975	Hesketh Racing	Hesketh 308C	Ford Cosworth DFV 3.0 V8	G		ROC	INT	SUI
1975	Hesketh Racing	Hesketh 308C	Ford Cosworth DFV 3.0 V8	G	James Hunt			8
1976	Hesketh Racing	Hesketh 308C	Ford Cosworth DFV 3.0 V8	G		ROC	INT	
1976	Hesketh Racing	Hesketh 308C	Ford Cosworth DFV 3.0 V8	G	Jacky Ickx	3		
1976	Wolf–Williams Racing	Wolf–Williams FW05	Ford Cosworth DFV 3.0 V8	G	Jacky Ickx		Ret	
1976	Wolf–Williams Racing	Wolf–Williams FW05	Ford Cosworth DFV 3.0 V8	G	Mario Andretti		7	
