= Hesketh 308D =

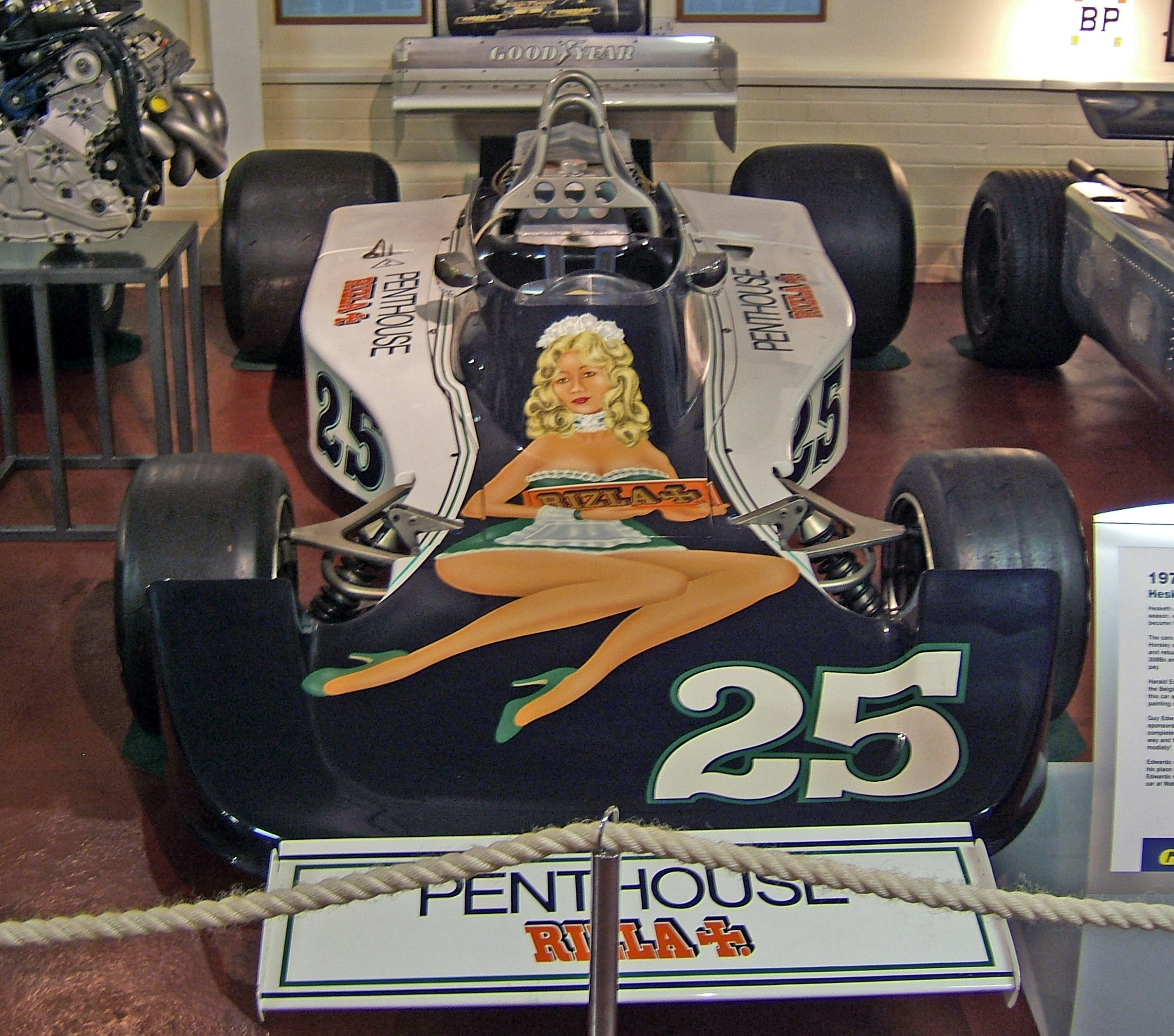
A Hesketh 308D in 1976's Penthouse Rizla Racing livery.

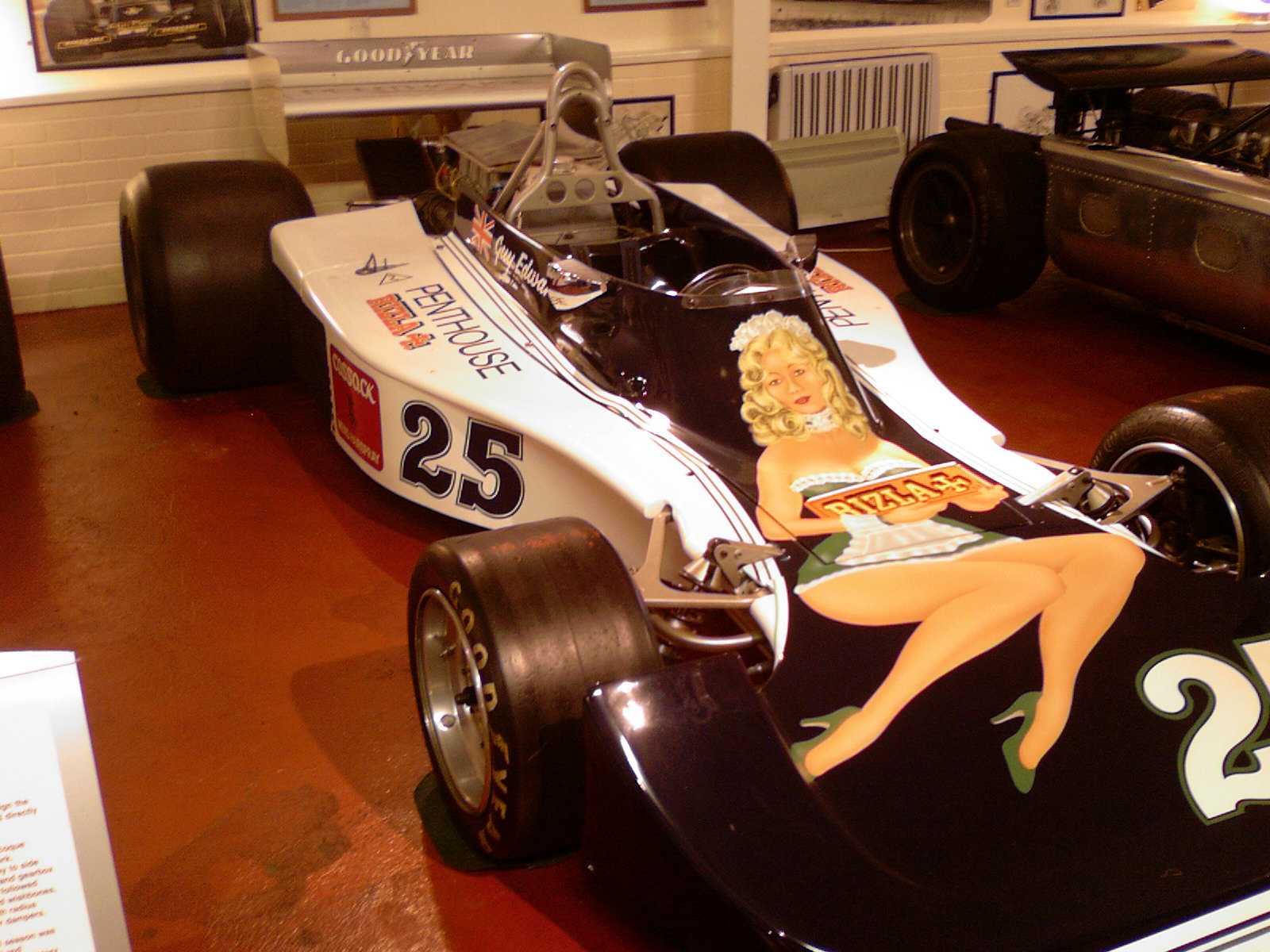
A Hesketh 308D at Donington

The Hesketh 308D is a Formula One racing car built by the Hesketh Racing team in 1976. The car was based on the Hesketh 308 originally designed by Harvey Postlethwaite, and was powered by a 3-litre V8 Ford Cosworth DFV engine.

Anthony 'Bubbles' Horsley updated the 308 to the 308D to continue as Hesketh Racing after Postlethwaite moved to Walter Wolf Racing. Nigel Stroud was team chief engineer and Harald Ertl was signed to drive the 308D for the 1976 season, with the team being sponsored by Penthouse and Rizla. Guy Edwards joined in a second 308D car from the Belgian Grand Prix, and Alex Ribeiro brought in some funds later in the year. The team scored no World Championship points in 1976, with Ertl's 7th place at the British Grand Prix being the team's best result of the year.

== Complete Formula One World Championship results ==
(key)

Year	Entrant(s)	Engine	Tyres	Drivers	1	2	3	4	5	6	7	8	9	10	11	12	13	14	15	16	WCC	Points
1976	Hesketh Racing	Ford V8	G		BRA	RSA	USW	ESP	BEL	MON	SWE	FRA	GBR	GER	AUT	NED	ITA	CAN	USE	JPN	NC	0
1976	Hesketh Racing	Ford V8	G	Harald Ertl		15	DNQ	DNQ	Ret	DNQ	Ret	Ret	7	Ret	8	Ret	16	DNS	13	8	NC	0
1976	Penthouse Rizla Racing with Hesketh	Ford V8	G	Guy Edwards					DNQ			17	Ret	15			DNS	20			NC	0
1976	Penthouse Rizla Racing with Hesketh	Ford V8	G	Rolf Stommelen												12					NC	0
1976	Penthouse Rizla Racing with Hesketh	Ford V8	G	Alex Ribeiro															12		NC	0
