= Patrick Nève =

Belgian racing driver (1949–2017)

- Born: Patrick Marie Ghislain Pierre Simon Stanislas Nève de Mévergnies; 13 October 1949; Liège, Belgium
- Died: 12 March 2017 (aged 67); Brussels, Belgium

Formula One World Championship career
- Nationality: (Belgium) Belgian
- Active years: 1976–1978
- Team(s): RAM, Ensign, Williams
- Entries: 14 (10 starts)
- Championships: 0
- Wins: 0
- Podiums: 0
- Career points: 0
- Pole positions: 0
- Fastest laps: 0
- First entry: 1976 Belgian Grand Prix
- Last entry: 1978 Belgian Grand Prix

Patrick Marie Ghislain Pierre Simon Stanislas Nève de Mévergnies (13 October 1949 – 12 March 2017) was a Belgian racing driver.

He participated in 14 Formula One Grands Prix, debuting on 16 May 1976. He was notable for being the first driver for Williams Grand Prix Engineering. He scored no championship points. His younger brother, Guy, was also a racing driver.

== Career ==
After some success in Formula Ford, where he won the 1974 STP Formula Ford Championship, and Formula 3, Nève initially moved up to Formula One with RAM, driving a Brabham. After a one-off drive with Ensign, he spent 1977 with newly formed Williams Grand Prix Engineering, driving a March with very little in the way of results. The following year, he tried to enter his own March in his home grand prix, but it was not authorized.

== Racing record ==
=== Complete European Formula Two Championship results ===
(key)

Year	Entrant	Chassis	Engine	1	2	3	4	5	6	7	8	9	10	11	12	13	14	Pos.	Pts
1975	Safir Engineering	Motul M1	Ford	EST	THR	HOC	NÜR	PAU	HOC	SAL	ROU	MUG	PER	SIL; DNS	ZOL	NOG	VAL	NC	0
1977	March Engineering	March 772P	BMW	SIL; 3	THR	HOC	NÜR	VAL	PAU	MUG	ROU	NOG	PER	MIS	EST	DON		14th	4
1978	Patrick Nève	March 782	BMW	THR; Ret	HOC	NÜR	PAU	MUG	VAL	ROU	DON	NOG	PER	MIS	HOC			NC	0
1979	Onyx Racing Engineering	Pilbeam MP42	Hart	SIL; Ret	HOC; Ret	THR; Ret	NÜR; Ret	VAL	MUG	PAU	HOC	ZAN	PER	MIS	DON			NC	0
1980	March Engineering	March 802	BMW	THR	HOC	NÜR	VAL	PAU	SIL	ZOL; Ret	MUG	ZAN	PER	MIS	HOC			NC	0
1983	Onyx Racing Engineering	March 832	BMW	SIL	THR	HOC	NÜR	VAL	PAU	JAR; 14	DON	MIS	PER	ZOL	MUG			NC	0

=== Complete Formula One results ===
(key)

Year	Entrant	Chassis	Engine	1	2	3	4	5	6	7	8	9	10	11	12	13	14	15	16	17	WDC	Pts
1976	Tissot RAM Racing	Brabham BT44B	Ford Cosworth DFV 3.0 V8	BRA	RSA	USW	ESP	BEL; Ret	MON	SWE											NC	0
1976	Team Ensign	Ensign N176	Ford Cosworth DFV 3.0 V8								FRA; 18	GBR	GER	AUT	NED	ITA	CAN	USA	JPN		NC	0
1977	Williams Grand Prix Engineering	March 761	Ford Cosworth DFV 3.0 V8	ARG	BRA	RSA	USW	ESP; 12	MON	BEL; 10	SWE; 15	FRA; DNQ	GBR; 10	GER; DNQ	AUT; 9	NED; DNQ	ITA; 7	USA; 18	CAN; Ret	JPN	NC	0
1978	Patrick Nève	March 781S	Ford Cosworth DFV 3.0 V8	ARG	BRA	RSA	USW	MON	BEL; DNP	ESP	SWE	FRA	GBR	GER	AUT	NED	ITA	USA	CAN		NC	0

=== Complete World Endurance Championship results ===
(key)

Year	Entrant	Class	Chassis	Engine	1	2	3	4	5	6	7	8	9	10	11	12	13	14	15	Pos.	Pts
1978	BMW Belgique	Gr.5	BMW 320i	BMW M12 2.0 L4	DAY	MUG; 10	DIJ; 13	SIL	NÜR; 9	MIS; 4	GLN	VAL								(Note: No drivers' Championship.)	
1980	March Engineering	IMSA	BMW M1	BMW M88 3.5 L6	DAY; 43	BRH; Ret	MUG	MNZ	SIL; Ret	NÜR	LMS; Ret	GLN	MOS	VAL	DIJ						
1981	Team Nashua	T+2.5	Ford Capri	Ford 3.0 V6	DAY	SEB	MUG	MNZ	RSD	SIL	NÜR	LMS	PER	DAY	GLN	SPA; Ret	MOS	ROA	BRH	NC	0
1982	March Racing	C	March 82G	Chevrolet 5.7 V8	MNZ	SIL; DNS	NÜR													NC	0
1982	March Racing	C	March 82G	Chevrolet 5.8 V8				LMS; Ret	SPA	MUG	FUJ	BRH								NC	0

Footnotes

=== Complete British Formula One Championship results ===
(key)

Year	Entrant	Chassis	Engine	1	2	3	4	5	6	7	8	9	10	11	12	13	14	15	Pos.	Pts
1979	Onyx race Engineering	Pilbeam MP42	Hart 420R 2.0 L4	ZOL	OUL	BRH	MAL	SNE; Ret	THR; NC	ZAN	DON	OUL	NOG	MAL	BRH	THR	SNE	SIL	NC	0

=== 24 Hours of Le Mans results ===
Year	Team	Co-Drivers	Car	Class	Laps	Pos.	Class Pos.
1980	(United Kingdom) March Engineering	(West Germany) Manfred Winkelhock (West Germany) Michael Korton	BMW M1	IMSA	38	DNF	DNF
1982	(United Kingdom) March Racing	(Sweden) Eje Elgh (United States) Jeff Wood	March 82G-Chevrolet	C	78	DNF	DNF
