= Polar Caravans =

Swedish caravan manufacturer

Polarvagnen
- Industry: Caravans
- Founded: 1964; 61 years ago
- Founders: Håkan Wallin and Bertil Holmqvist
- Headquarters: Dorotea, Västerbotten County, Sweden
- Number of employees: Nearly 100
- Website: polarvagnen.com (English)

Polar Caravans (Swedish: Polarvagnen, often abbreviated to Polar) is a Swedish manufacturer of caravans. The caravans are manufactured in Dorotea, Västerbotten County, employing nearly 100 people.

The company is now called SoliferPolar AB. Adjacent to the factory in Dorotea is a caravan museum. Solifer, originally Finnish, moved the production to Dorotea in 2004. Since 2014, all manufacturing has taken place in Germany, while only Polar still manufactures its campers in Sweden.

== History ==
Polarvagnen AB was founded in the spring of 1964 by Håkan Wallin and Bertil Holmqvist when they started their caravan production in an old barn in Junselevallen. One October evening in 1966, the factory premises were devastated by a fire, and after several trips, the production eventually ended up in Dorotea in 1968. The company's logo, a polar bear, was designed by Ragnar Granqvist.

Since its foundation, Polar Caravans are some of the most sold in Sweden, and the company claims that 80% of all the caravans made are still on the road today.

== Advertising ==
Polar Caravans have made various advertising videos to promote their caravans.

== Sponsorship ==
Polar Caravans was the official F1 title sponsor of the 1975 Swedish Grand Prix. The company also sponsored the F1 career of Torsten Palm that year, giving his Hesketh-Ford the name Polar Caravans.

== See also ==
- List of companies of Sweden
