= Hesketh Racing =

Formula One racing team

Hesketh
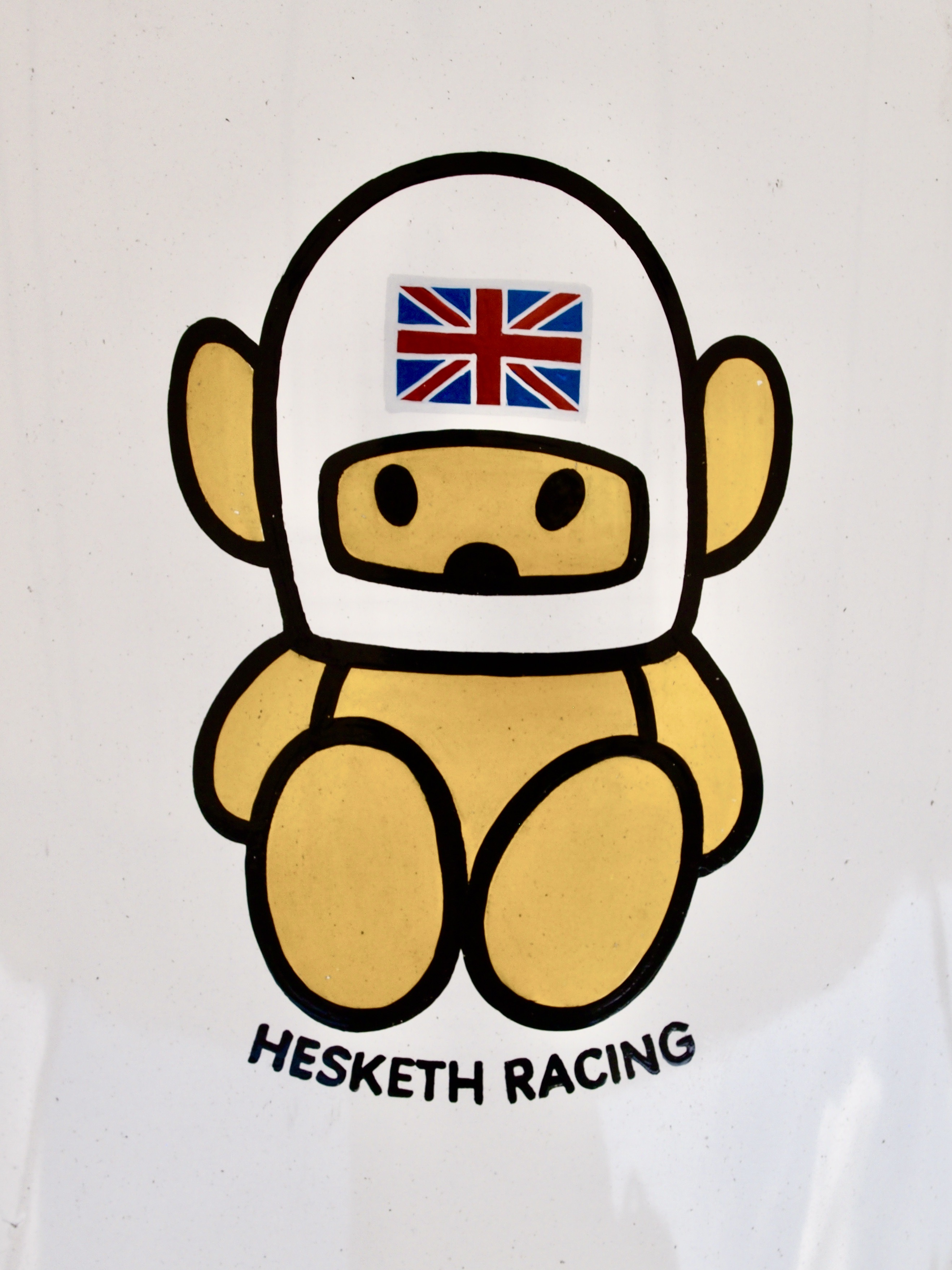
- Full name: Hesketh Racing
- Base: United Kingdom
- Noted staff: Lord Hesketh; Harvey Postlethwaite
- Noted drivers: (United Kingdom) James Hunt (Australia) Alan Jones
- Website: heskethracing.co.uk

Formula One World Championship career
- First entry: 1974 South African Grand Prix
- Races entered: 52
- Constructors' Championships: 0
- Drivers' Championships: 0
- Race victories: 1
- Pole positions: 0
- Fastest laps: 1
- Final entry: 1978 South African Grand Prix

Hesketh Racing was a Formula One constructor from the United Kingdom, which competed from 1973 to 1978. The team competed in 52 World Championship Grands Prix, winning one and achieving eight further podium finishes. Its best placing in the World Constructors' Championship was fourth in 1975. Hesketh gave James Hunt his Formula One debut, and he brought the team most of its success, and only win. Alan Jones also began his Formula One career in a privately entered Hesketh.

== Formation ==
Lord Hesketh, in partnership with Anthony 'Bubbles' Horsley as driver, entered various Formula Three events around Europe in 1972, aiming simply to have as much fun as possible. Due partly to Horsley's lack of experience, there were few results. Hesketh ran his race team out of the stables at his Easton Neston family estate in Northamptonshire.

Hesketh subsequently employed James Hunt, who had a reputation for being very fast but also for crashing frequently, and who was unemployed at the time. Hesketh took on Hunt as one of his drivers for F3.

The Hesketh team had a growing reputation for their playboy style, arriving at races in Rolls-Royce cars, drinking champagne regardless of their results, and checking the entire team into five-star hotels. The team had a patch specially made for Hunt's driving suit which read: "Sex – The Breakfast of Champions".

By the middle of the season, Hunt and Horsley had written off both of the team's Formula Three cars. Horsley decided to leave the cockpit, switching to the team's management. Hesketh rented a Formula Two March car for the rest of 1972, and bought Hunt a Surtees Formula Two car for 1973. Hunt then wrote the car off at the Pau Grand Prix. Hesketh worked out that the cost involved in competing in the top flight was hardly more expensive than F2, and decided to move the team up to Formula One.

== Formula One ==
=== James Hunt era ===
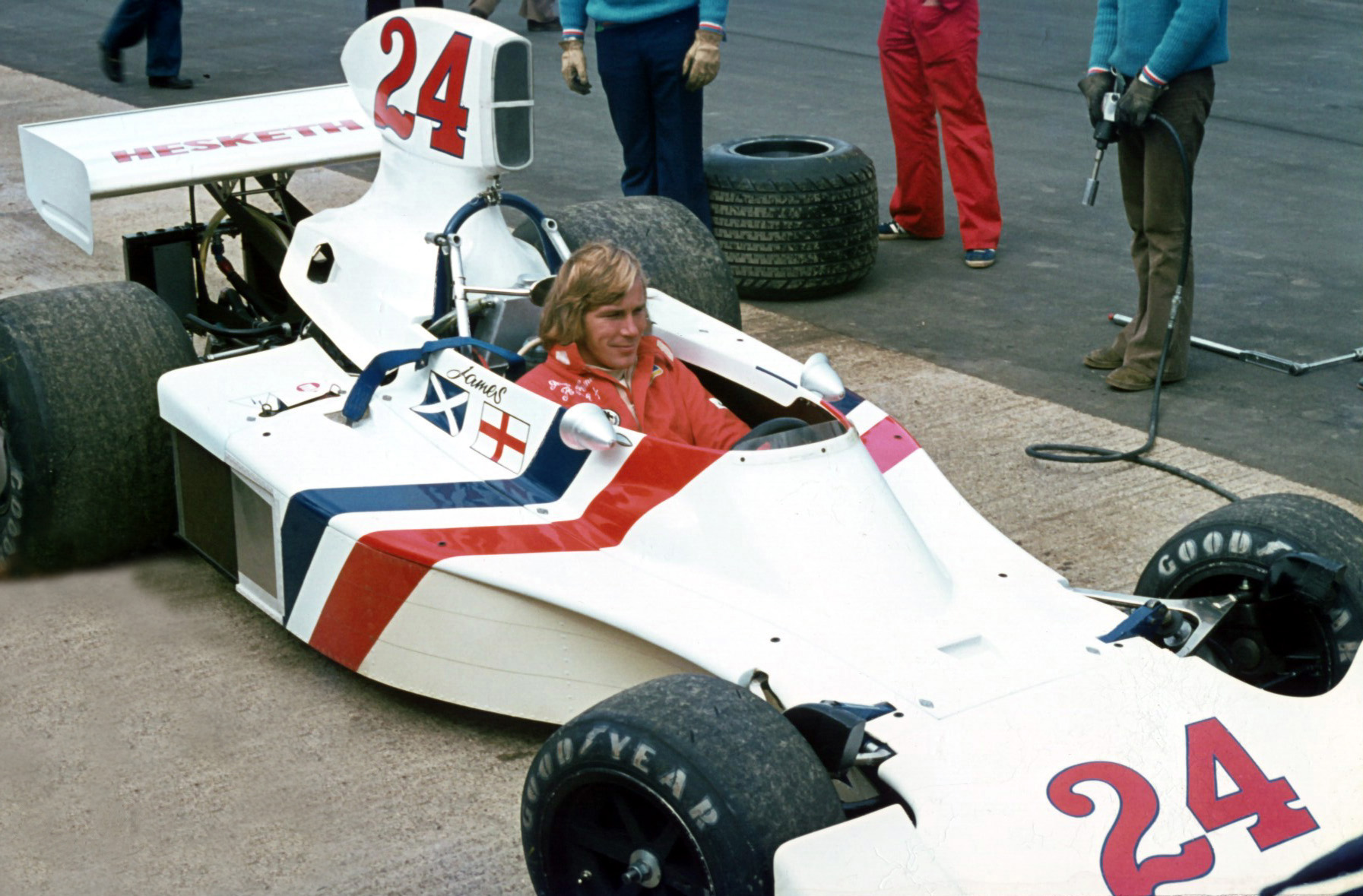
James Hunt in the Hesketh in 1975

Hesketh rented a Surtees TS9 for the non-championship Race of Champions at Brands Hatch, with Hunt finishing third. This success led to the purchase of a March 731, with Hesketh also signing junior March Engineering designer Harvey Postlethwaite to modify the chassis, working from Hesketh's Easton Neston estate. The car made its first appearance at the 1973 Monaco Grand Prix, where Hunt ran sixth before the engine failed. He scored a point at the team's next entry, the French Grand Prix, improved to fourth for the British Grand Prix, and then third for the Dutch Grand Prix. He then took second place in the season-closing United States Grand Prix.

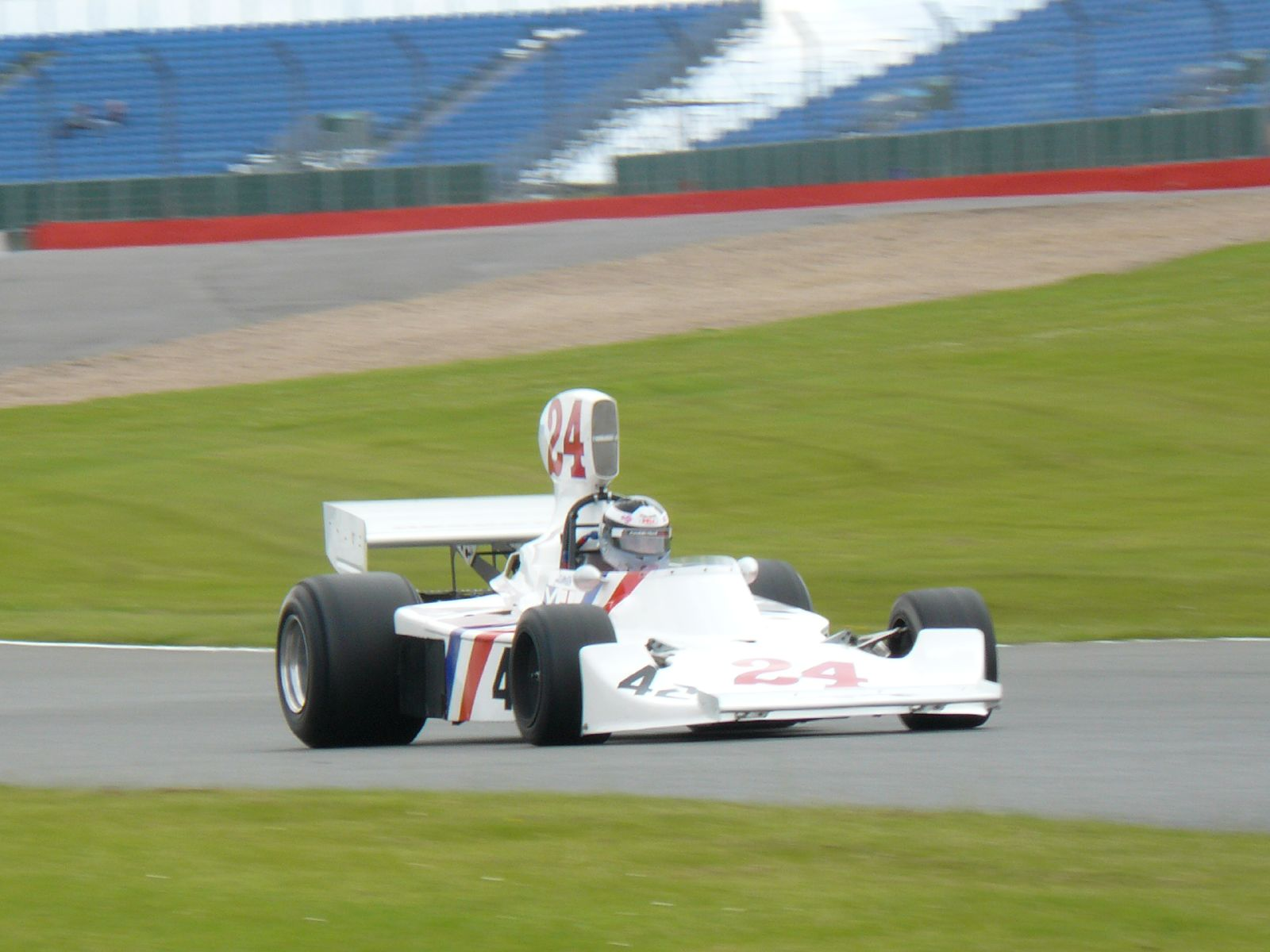
James Hunt's Hesketh 308 being driven by his son, Freddie, in 2007.

In 1974, Postlethwaite designed an all-new car for the team, the Hesketh 308, which was ready for the Silverstone International Trophy, which Hunt won, making its championship debut at the South African Grand Prix. The car was strong, taking third place at the Swedish Grand Prix, the Austrian Grand Prix and the United States Grand Prix. For 1975, examples of the 308 were sold to Harry Stiller Racing, who gave Alan Jones his grand prix debut. Polar Caravans also purchased a Hesketh chassis, while the works team modified the 308 for Hunt. At the same time, Horsley was developing into an efficient and competent team manager and under his guidance, the team moved forward.

Hunt won the wet-dry 1975 Dutch Grand Prix, holding off Niki Lauda's dominant Ferrari, and also led at the British Grand Prix and the Austrian Grand Prix, taking several placings on his way to fourth overall.

=== Post-Hunt ===
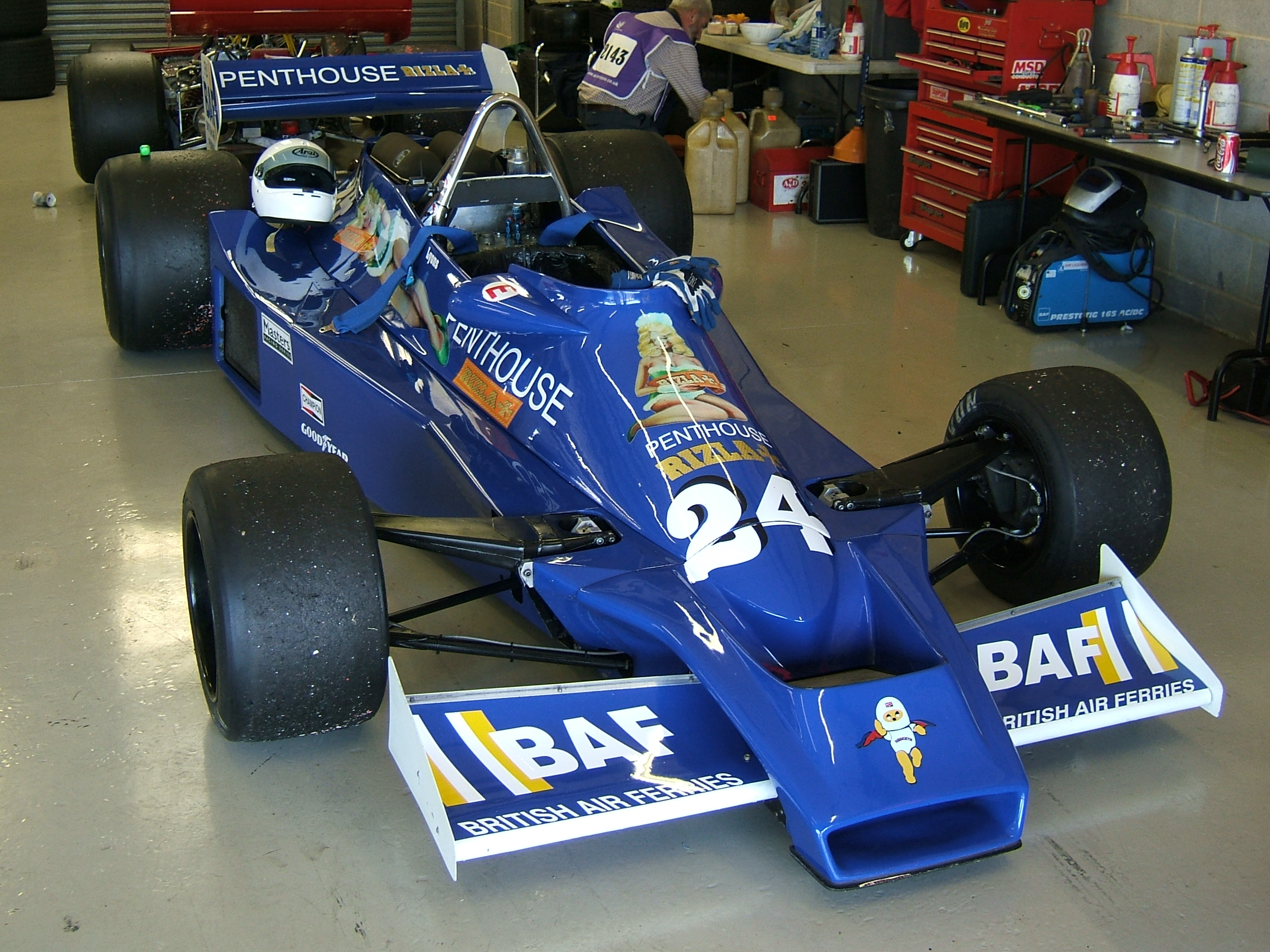
A Hesketh 308E in 1977's Penthouse Rizla Racing livery.

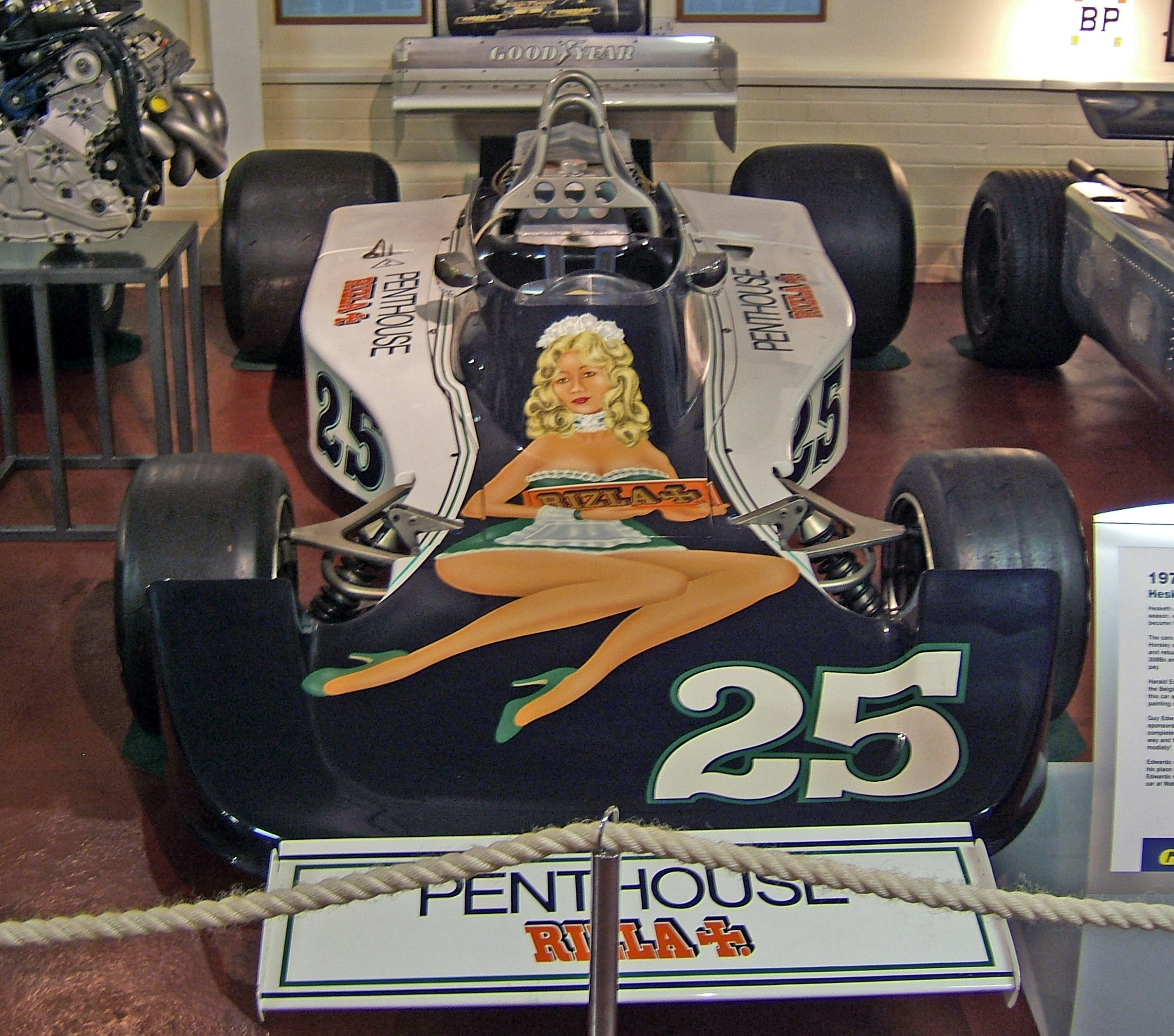
A Hesketh 308D on show at the Donington Grand Prix Exhibition

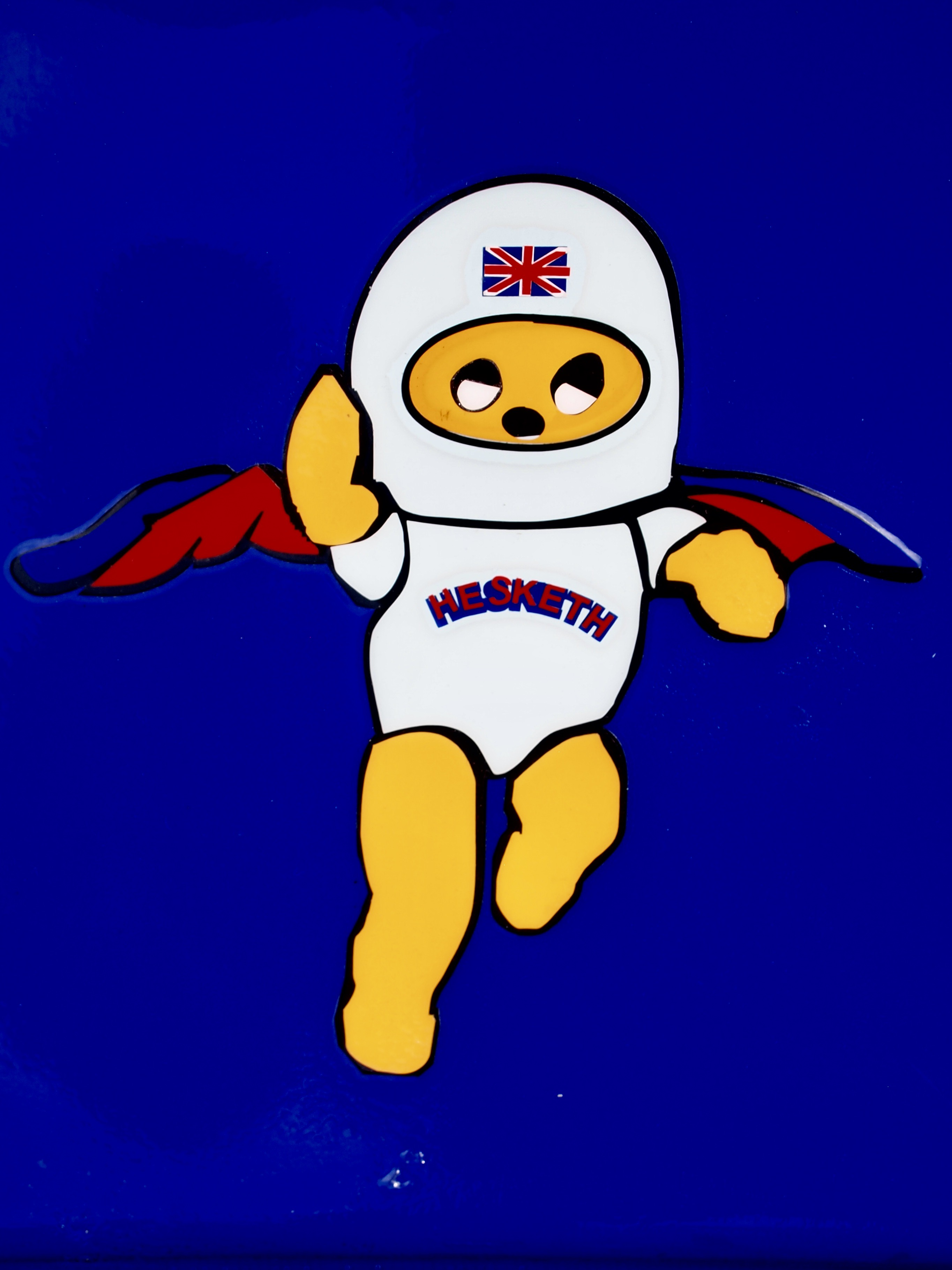
Hesketh team logo from 1977, Goodwood Festival of Speed 2015

In late 1975, Hesketh announced that he could no longer afford to try to produce the next British world champion, having raced without sponsorship, and ended his involvement with the team. Hunt was offered the lead drive at McLaren, replacing Emerson Fittipaldi.

Postlethwaite took his upgraded 308C design to Wolf–Williams Racing. Horsley upgraded the 308 to the 308D and continued as Hesketh Racing. Harald Ertl signed to drive the car, with the team's image landing Penthouse Magazine and Rizla as sponsors. Guy Edwards joined in a second car from the Belgian Grand Prix onwards with Alex Ribeiro bringing in some funds later in the year. Ertl's seventh place at the British Grand Prix was the team's best result of the year. Future Williams engineer Patrick Head noted that the 308D had significant aerodynamic issues at the rear of the car which hindered performance.

Frank Dernie designed the new 308E chassis for the 1977 season, with Rupert Keegan driving alongside Ertl. Later in the season a third car was entered for Héctor Rebaque, with Horsley simply trying to bring in money to the team. Ertl left and was replaced by Ian Ashley, but by now Keegan's was the only entry that usually made it to the grid, and his seventh place at the Austrian Grand Prix was the team's best finish of the year.

In 1978 the team slimmed down to a single car, with backing from Olympus Cameras. The car itself was barely upgraded, and Divina Galica failed to qualify for the first two races. Eddie Cheever then managed to get into the South African Grand Prix, retiring with a fractured oil line. Derek Daly was the next to try the car, and at the wet International Trophy at Silverstone, in his debut, diced for the lead with James Hunt's McLaren before a stone cracked his visor and ended his race. However, in world championship events he failed to qualify for the next three races, after which the team folded.

== Sports cars ==
The Ibec-Hesketh 308LM, also later referred to as the "Ibec P6" and the "Ibec 308LM Cobra", is a one-off sports prototype racing car that was built in 1978, and was designed by Postlethwaite around many components of the Hesketh 308 Formula One car. The car was funded by Lloyd's of London insurance broker Ian Bracey, who formed the Ian Bracey Engineering Company to oversee the project.

Unlike many privateer sports car entrants in the late 1970s, Bracey harboured serious hopes of winning the 24 Hours of Le Mans endurance race. Rather than buy an only partially competitive off-the-peg chassis on which to build, Bracey commissioned former Hesketh chief designer Postlethwaite to design a brand new chassis around a detuned 3.0-litre Cosworth DFV engine. Postlethwaite used his Hesketh connections to buy both front and rear suspension components from the F1 team, and the building of the car was commenced in the Hesketh workshops. However, as the Hesketh racing team's fortunes dipped, the Ibec chassis dropped down the priority list and eventually Bracey moved production to Lyncar in Slough. Here, facing a tight deadline, the Lyncar team managed to complete the car in just over five weeks.

The Ibec design had a main chassis formed by a riveted and bonded aluminium monocoque, behind which the DFV engine and Hewland FG400 gearbox were bolted as stressed chassis members. Suspension was by double wishbones at the front, with twin trailing arms, parallel lower links and single top links at the rear. The car was clothed in fibreglass bodywork which had been properly wind tunnel tested, and which proved highly effective at generating both downforce in corners and stability at high speed. The total cost of designing and building the 308LM was less than £100,000, approximately £0.5 million at 2005 prices, more than most privateer teams, but far lower than many contemporary factory race programs.

The car's first competitive outing was, as planned, at the 1978 24 Hours of Le Mans race, driven by Ian Grob and Guy Edwards, with Bracey himself acting as reserve driver. Edwards's presence in the team had an additional benefit as his skills at sponsorship negotiation landed the small Ibec team with backing from the giant Chrysler corporation, despite the 308LM being Ford-powered. Edwards qualified the Ibec in 13th position, at an average speed of 133 mph. However, in the race itself the car suffered from mechanical troubles which dropped it to 42nd position after just a few hours. Despite recovering well from this early setback, in the 19th hour the DFV engine failed completely and the Ibec's race was over.

The Ibec P6 failed to qualify at LeMans in 1980 and failed to finish in 1981 (driven by Tiff Needell and Tony Trimmer). The car was converted for use in the UK Thundersports championship during the mid-1980s.

== Complete Formula One World Championship results ==
(key)

Year	Chassis	Engine	Drivers	1	2	3	4	5	6	7	8	9	10	11	12	13	14	15	16	17	Points	WCC
1973	March 731	Ford Cosworth DFV 3.0 V8		ARG	BRA	RSA	ESP	BEL	MON	SWE	FRA	GBR	NED	GER	AUT	ITA	CAN	USA			—^{1}	—^{1}
1973	March 731	Ford Cosworth DFV 3.0 V8	(United Kingdom) James Hunt						9		6	4^{F}	3		Ret	DNS	7	2^{F}			—^{1}	—^{1}
1974	March 731	Ford Cosworth DFV 3.0 V8		ARG	BRA	RSA	ESP	BEL	MON	SWE	NED	FRA	GBR	GER	AUT	ITA	CAN	USA			—^{1}	—^{1}
1974	March 731	Ford Cosworth DFV 3.0 V8	(United Kingdom) James Hunt	Ret	9																—^{1}	—^{1}
1974	308	Ford Cosworth DFV 3.0 V8	(United Kingdom) James Hunt			Ret	10	Ret	Ret	3	Ret	Ret	Ret	Ret	3	Ret	4	3			15	6th
1974	308	Ford Cosworth DFV 3.0 V8	(South Africa) Ian Scheckter												DNQ						15	6th
1975	308; 308B; 308C	Ford Cosworth DFV 3.0 V8		ARG	BRA	RSA	ESP	MON	BEL	SWE	NED	FRA	GBR	GER	AUT	ITA	USA				33	4th
1975	308; 308B; 308C	Ford Cosworth DFV 3.0 V8	(United Kingdom) James Hunt	2^{F}	6	Ret	Ret	Ret	Ret	Ret	1	2	4	Ret	2^{‡}	5	4				33	4th
1975	308; 308B; 308C	Ford Cosworth DFV 3.0 V8	(Australia) Alan Jones				Ret	Ret	Ret	11											33	4th
1975	308; 308B; 308C	Ford Cosworth DFV 3.0 V8	(Sweden) Torsten Palm					DNQ		10											33	4th
1975	308; 308B; 308C	Ford Cosworth DFV 3.0 V8	(Austria) Harald Ertl											8	Ret	9					33	4th
1975	308; 308B; 308C	Ford Cosworth DFV 3.0 V8	(United States) Brett Lunger												13	10	Ret				33	4th
1976	308D	Ford Cosworth DFV 3.0 V8		BRA	RSA	USW	ESP	BEL	MON	SWE	FRA	GBR	GER	AUT	NED	ITA	CAN	USA	JPN		0	NC
1976	308D	Ford Cosworth DFV 3.0 V8	(Austria) Harald Ertl		15	DNQ	DNQ	Ret	DNQ	Ret	Ret	7	Ret	8	Ret	16	DNS	13	8		0	NC
1976	308D	Ford Cosworth DFV 3.0 V8	(United Kingdom) Guy Edwards					DNQ			17	Ret	15			DNS	20				0	NC
1976	308D	Ford Cosworth DFV 3.0 V8	(West Germany) Rolf Stommelen												12						0	NC
1976	308D	Ford Cosworth DFV 3.0 V8	(Brazil) Alex Ribeiro															12			0	NC
1977	308E	Ford Cosworth DFV 3.0 V8		ARG	BRA	RSA	USW	ESP	MON	BEL	SWE	FRA	GBR	GER	AUT	NED	ITA	USA	CAN	JPN	0	NC
1977	308E	Ford Cosworth DFV 3.0 V8	(United Kingdom) Rupert Keegan					Ret	12	Ret	13	10	Ret	Ret	7	Ret	9	8	Ret		0	NC
1977	308E	Ford Cosworth DFV 3.0 V8	(Austria) Harald Ertl					Ret	DNQ	9	16	DNQ									0	NC
1977	308E	Ford Cosworth DFV 3.0 V8	(Mexico) Héctor Rebaque							DNQ	DNQ	DNQ		Ret	DNQ	DNQ					0	NC
1977	308E	Ford Cosworth DFV 3.0 V8	(United Kingdom) Ian Ashley												DNQ	DNQ	DNQ	17	DNS		0	NC
1978	308E	Ford Cosworth DFV 3.0 V8		ARG	BRA	RSA	USW	MON	BEL	ESP	SWE	FRA	GBR	GER	AUT	NED	ITA	USA	CAN		0	NC
1978	308E	Ford Cosworth DFV 3.0 V8	(United Kingdom) Divina Galica	DNQ	DNQ																0	NC
1978	308E	Ford Cosworth DFV 3.0 V8	(United States) Eddie Cheever			Ret															0	NC
1978	308E	Ford Cosworth DFV 3.0 V8	(Republic of Ireland) Derek Daly				DNPQ	DNPQ	DNQ												0	NC

Notes

- ^1 – Not entered as a constructor.
- ‡ – Half points awarded as less than 75% of the race distance was completed.

=== Non-Championship results ===
(key)

Year	Chassis	Engine	Driver	1	2	3
1973	Surtees TS9	Ford Cosworth DFV 3.0 V8		ROC	INT	
1973	Surtees TS9	Ford Cosworth DFV 3.0 V8	(United Kingdom) James Hunt	3		
1974	March 731	Ford Cosworth DFV 3.0 V8		PRE	ROC	INT
1974	March 731	Ford Cosworth DFV 3.0 V8	(United Kingdom) James Hunt	Ret		
1974	308	Ford Cosworth DFV 3.0 V8	(United Kingdom) James Hunt		Ret	1
1975	308C	Ford Cosworth DFV 3.0 V8		ROC	INT	SUI
1975	308C	Ford Cosworth DFV 3.0 V8	(United Kingdom) James Hunt		Ret	8
1975	308C	Ford Cosworth DFV 3.0 V8	(Australia) Alan Jones		7	
1976	308D	Ford Cosworth DFV 3.0 V8		ROC	INT	
1976	308D	Ford Cosworth DFV 3.0 V8	(Austria) Harald Ertl	Ret		
1976	308D	Ford Cosworth DFV 3.0 V8	(United Kingdom) Guy Edwards		Ret	
1977	308E	Ford Cosworth DFV 3.0 V8		ROC		
1977	308E	Ford Cosworth DFV 3.0 V8	(United Kingdom) Rupert Keegan	8		
1978	308E	Ford Cosworth DFV 3.0 V8		INT		
1978	308E	Ford Cosworth DFV 3.0 V8	(Republic of Ireland) Derek Daly	Ret		
1978	308E	Ford Cosworth DFV 3.0 V8	(United Kingdom) Divina Galica	Ret		

== See also ==
- Rush, 2013 film by Ron Howard, closely based on Hunt–Lauda rivalry.
