= Guy Nève =

Belgian racing driver (1955-1992)

Guy Hervé Ghislain Marie Stanislas Nève de Mévergnies (24 April 1955 – 28 June 1992) was a Belgian racing driver. He was the younger brother of fellow racer Patrick Nève, who he had competed with and against.

== Racing career ==
Guy Nève began racing as early as 1980 in national events, competing in endurance races within Europe. In 1985, he won the Belgian Group N class championship for cars with engines larger than 2.5 litres, driving a BMW 635 CSi.

Guy raced touring cars almost exclusively - in 1987, he was given the opportunity to drive a Porsche powered Argo JM19 prototype for the 1000km of Spa. During practice, a wheel flew off of his car and struck two marshals, one of whom named Jacky Bouillon passed away later from the injuries. Nève, who previously didn't know that anyone had been hit, decided to withdraw from the race after hearing of the tragedy.

By 1992, Nève had participated in several seasons of the Belgian Procar championship driving Porsche 911s. In his final season, he drove for the Porsche Club of Belgium with teammate Roland de Jamblinne, who had been teammates with Nève as early as 1989.

=== Death ===
Guy's final race took place at the temporary street circuit of Chimay, Belgium, on the 28th of June, 1992. The track, which was 5.9 miles/9.5 kilometers long and incredibly fast due to primarily being composed of long straights, was infamous for its danger, lacking any barriers and guardrails for the majority of its length. In 1972, it was the site of compatriot Yvo Graul's fatal crash.

There were two heats - the first heat saw the death of a spectator after the Honda Civic of Michel Maillien slid sideways into a group of fans watching the race. Despite this, the second heat was allowed to start. After several laps, Nève collided with the competing BMW M3 E30 of Patrick Slaus on the exit of the fast Virage Spikins curve. He veered off the track and hit a grass bank, flipping and somersaulting several times before the car came to rest on its roof. As the car suffered several impacts to the front end where the fuel tank was located, the front of the car burst into flames. Due to the violent nature of the initial flips, it's unknown whether or not Nève was still alive after his car stopped.

Attempts by the track marshals to extinguish the fire were futile, and several of Nève's fellow competitors tried to aid the situation, but to no avail. Roland de Jamblinne, Nève's teammate who refused to race but was still present at the track, retired from racing after hearing of the news. Guy's brother, Patrick, also made the same decision.

After the tragedy, the trailer that Guy's team used to transport their cars was lined with the flowers given to the race winners. At that same year's 24 Hours of Spa, his team wrote "Salut Guy" in front of the start/finish line in his memory. Over 3000 people attended his funeral, and when the Chimay circuit underwent a major revision, shortening the course and increasing safety measures, the first chicane after the first corner was named after him.

== Personal life ==
Outside of racing, he was a lawyer, and was an executive member of the Royal Automobile Club of Belgium. He had a wife, Charlotte, and three children.
