= Harald Ertl =

Austrian racing driver and journalist (1948–1982)

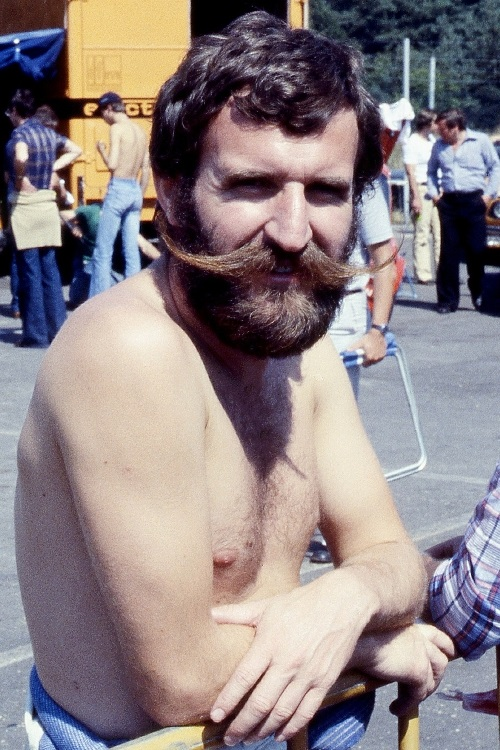
- Ertl in 1978 at Zolder
- Born: 31 August 1948; Zell am See, Salzburg, Austria
- Died: 7 April 1982 (aged 33); Hohenahr, Hesse, West Germany

Formula One World Championship career
- Nationality: (Austria) Austrian
- Active years: 1975–1978, 1980
- Team(s): Hesketh, Ensign, ATS
- Entries: 28 (19 starts)
- Championships: 0
- Wins: 0
- Podiums: 0
- Career points: 0
- Pole positions: 0
- Fastest laps: 0
- First entry: 1975 German Grand Prix
- Last entry: 1980 German Grand Prix

Harald Ertl (31 August 1948 – 7 April 1982) was an Austrian racing driver and motorsport journalist. He was born in Zell am See and attended the same school as Grand Prix drivers Jochen Rindt, Helmut Marko and Niki Lauda.

Ertl sported an 'Imperial'-style moustache and full beard. He worked his way through the German Formula Vee and Super Vee, and then on to Formula Three, before a successful switch to Touring Cars. During this period, he gained sufficient sponsorship to enter Formula One, where he drove with various outfits between 1975 and 1980. Ertl was one of the four drivers who helped to get Niki Lauda out of his burning Ferrari in the 1976 German Grand Prix.

Ertl was killed in an aeroplane crash in 1982, when the small plane he was travelling in suffered from engine failure.

== Early racing career ==
In 1969, Ertl bought a Formula V car (Austro Vau), won six races, but also rolled it at the Nürburgring. He was second in the European Cup with a Kaimann chassis in 1970, and started also in a round of the Championnat de France with a March-Ford 703, at Aéroport Dijon-Longvic circuit. He continued with F3 the following season, undertaking a selection of races in England, best result being ninth at Brands Hatch.

In 1971, Ertl also moved to the European Touring Car Championship, driving an Alfa Romeo, gaining a third place at Monza in the Monza 4 hours. For 1972, he switched to the BMW-Alpina team in the Deutsche Rennsport Meisterschaft. The best result of the season, with a fourth place in the first race, International ADAC-Eifelrennen, held on the Nürburgring Nordschleife.

1973 saw Ertl continue to mix Formula Three and Touring Cars, with little success, until the September, when at the side of Derek Bell, they would win the RAC Tourist Trophy, with both drivers each winning their respective heat, to take an aggregate victory.

For 1974, Ertl's main target was the Deutsche Formel 3 Polifac Trophy. Once again, his best result came at the Nürburgring, where finished fourth. Meanwhile, he also raced in the Formal Super Vee Gold Pokal, taking 19th in the final standings. During this season, Ertl made his F2 debut, racing at both the European Championship for F2 Drivers events at Hockenheim.

In 1975, Ertl signed for Fred Opert Racing to continue racing in F2. By the third race for the team he was on the podium. A third place in the Internationales ADAC-Eifelrennen, held on the Nürburgring Nordschleife enabled him gather enough money together, including sponsorship from Warsteiner to start racing in F1.

== Formula One career ==
In 1975, sponsorship obtained from Warsteiner had allowed Ertl to drive a Hesketh 308 in Formula One, prepared by Hesketh Racing in Warsteiner's golden livery. In his debut at the German Grand Prix, he finished 8th. He went on to retire in his home GP, then finished ninth at Monza.

Encouraged by these results, a full season with Hesketh was planned for 1976. In the South African Grand Prix, Ertl qualified in the last row and finished 15th. The next races saw him either not qualify at all, or at the back of the grid, with early retirements due to mechanical failures. Despite not being satisfied with the value the team gave him for the money, he almost scored a point when coming in seventh at the 1976 British Grand Prix, albeit three laps down.

Two weeks later at the 1976 German Grand Prix, Ertl was one of the four drivers who helped pull Niki Lauda from his burning Ferrari after Lauda's infamous crash during the second lap of the race. The rest of the season saw two more eighth places finishes as highlights, at home and at the wet Japanese Grand Prix.

Ertl continued with Hesketh for a third season, taking in some European races, finishing ninth at the 1977 Belgian Grand Prix. He left Hesketh after the 1977 French Grand Prix where he again failed to qualify for the race.

For a few races in 1978, Ertl entered with Ensign, but things were even worse there, with the cars failing to finish or even worst, when he did not survive prequalifying at Monza. At the same event, he got another chance with the spare car of German-language ATS team, as regular driver Jochen Mass injured himself in the pre-Monza test a few days prior. He still failed to make the cut.

Two years later, Ertl tried once again with ATS in the 1980 German Grand Prix with the same result. The last Formula One Grand Prix he took part in was the 1978 Austrian Grand Prix, in his home country.

While not racing F1, Ertl was still racing in F2, albeit with very little success. In these three seasons, he finished just once in the top six.

== DRM years ==
Away from single-seaters, Ertl returned to Deutsche Rennsport Meisterschaft (DRM) in 1977, now that the series had switched to Group 5 "Special Production Cars".

Based on experience with their BMW, Schnitzer Motorsport developed a Toyota Celica LB Turbo for Ertl in 1977. Schnitzer switched back to BMW for the 1978 season, retaining the services for Ertl. This move made him one of the main contenders for the title. With the Kremer Racing Porsche 935 of Bob Wollek being bit off the pace, while the Ford entrant, Zakspeed’s Escort being outdated, and their Ford Capri Turbo was unreliable. Ertl would win five of the 11 races during the season, with a second place at the season finale, a Super Sprint event at the Nürburgring, he would win the championship.

Despite taking the title with Schnitzer, Ertl switched to Zakspeed for the next two seasons. 1979 started off promising with a win in the opening round at Zolder, then followed it up with a third in Hockenheim in the next race. Although he would win once more at Mainz-Finthen, the season turned miserable with six non-finishes or non-starts out of 11 races, in Zakspeed’s Ford Capri Turbo.

1979 Lotus Europa Turbo Gr.5

Meanwhile, Zakspeed also developed a mid-engined Lotus Europa for the 1000km Nürburgring, using a ToJ sportscar chassis, the 4cyl-Ford-based Zakspeed turbo engine, and parts of a Lotus Europa. That also did not finish the race. The following season was like the previous one, when Ertl continued to be unlucky: 8 poles, 4 wins and 6 retirements.

== Death ==
Ertl did not race internationally at all in 1981, but had planned a return for the 1982 Renault 5 Turbo Cup. However, before these plans came through, he was killed in an aircraft accident at the age of 33. He was travelling in a Beechcraft Bonanza flown by his brother-in-law Jörg Becker-Hohensee from Mannheim to their holiday home in Sylt in Northern Germany for an Easter vacation. Less than a quarter of the way through the intended flight distance engine failure caused the plane to crash at Hohenahr near Giessen. Ertl's wife Vera and son Sebastian were injured but Becker-Hohensee, Ertl, and his niece were killed.

== Racing record ==
=== Career highlights ===
Season	Series	Position	Team	Car
1971	European Touring Car Championship	31st	Alfa Romeo Hähn; Autodelta SpA	Alfa Romeo GTAm
1972	Deutsche Rennsport Meisterschaft	27th	BMW-Alpina	BMW 2002
1973	Formula Super Vee Europe	12th		Maco-Volkswagen
1973	Deutsche Rennsport Meisterschaft	40th	Auto-Fox-Racing Team	Alfa Romeo 2000 GTAm
1973	British Saloon Car Championship	20th	BMW-Alpina	BMW 3.0 CSL
1974	Polifac Formel 3 Trophy	13th	Caravanbau Günther Hennerici; Hannen Alt Racing Team	Rheinland-Toyota 374
1974	Formal Super Vau Gold Pokal	19th		Horag-Volkswagen
1974	Formula Super Vee Europe	21st		Horag-Volkswagen
1975	European Championship for Formula 2 Drivers	19th	Fred Opert Racing	Chevron-BMW B27
1975	Interserie	25th	Rex-Auto-Racing-Team	Rex-Cosworth SP1
1976	European Championship for Formula 2 Drivers	15th	Motor Racing Company; Fred Opert Racing	March-BMW 752; Chevron-BMW B35
1977	Deutsche Rennsport Meisterschaft	25th	Optische Werke Rodenstock; Toyota Deutschland	BMW 2002 Turbo; Toyota Celica LB Turbo
1978	Deutsche Rennsport Meisterschaft	**1st**	Sachs-Sporting	BMW 320 Turbo
1979	Deutsche Rennsport Meisterschaft	10th	Sachs-Sporting	Ford Capri Turbo
1979	Interserie – Div. 2	18th	Minolta Camera Team	Lotus Europa Turbo
1980	Deutsche Rennsport Meisterschaft	7th	Sachs-Sporting	Ford Capri Turbo

=== Complete British Saloon Car Championship results ===
(key) (Races in bold indicate pole position; races in italics indicate fastest lap.)

Year	Team	Car	Class	1	2	3	4	5	6	7	8	9	DC	Pts	Class
1973	BMW-Alpina	BMW 3.0 CSL	D	BRH	SIL	THR	THR	SIL	ING	BRH	SIL ovr:1 cls:1	BRH	20th	9	4th

=== Complete European Formula Two Championship results ===
(key) (Races in bold indicate pole position; races in italics indicate fastest lap)

Year	Entrant	Chassis	Engine	1	2	3	4	5	6	7	8	9	10	11	12	13	14	Pos.	Pts
1974	Team Obermoser	March 742	BMW	BAR	HOC; Ret	PAU	SAL	HOC	MUG	KAR	PER							NC	0
1974	Chevron Racing Team	Chevron B27	BMW									HOC; NC	VLL					NC	0
1975	Fred Opert Racing	Chevron B27	BMW	EST	THR; NC	HOC; Ret	NÜR; 3	PAU; Ret										19th	4
1975	Fred Opert Racing	Chevron B29	BMW						HOC; 7	SAL; 11	ROU; Ret	MUG; Ret	PER; 12	SIL; Ret	ZOL	NOG	VLL	19th	4
1976	Motor Racing Co	March 752	BMW	HOC; 6														15th	2
1976	Motor Racing Co	Chevron B35	BMW		THR; Ret													15th	2
1976	Fred Opert Racing	Chevron B35	BMW			VLL; 12	SAL; 17	PAU	HOC; Ret	ROU	MUG; 15	PER; 7			HOC; Ret			15th	2
1976	Chevron Racing Team	Chevron B35	BMW										EST; 10	NOG				15th	2
1977	Team Obermoser Eurorace	Chevron B35	BMW	SIL	THR	HOC; Ret	NÜR; Ret	VLL	PAU	MUG	ROU	NOG	PER	MIS	EST	DON		NC	0
1978	Harald Ertl Racing	March 782	BMW	THR	HOC; Ret	NÜR	PAU	MUG	VLL	ROU	DON	NOG	PER	MIS				NC	0
1978	ICI Chevron Cars	Chevron B42	BMW												HOC; DNQ			NC	0

=== Complete Formula One World Championship results ===
(key)

Year	Entrant	Chassis	Engine	1	2	3	4	5	6	7	8	9	10	11	12	13	14	15	16	17	WDC	Pts
1975	Warsteiner Brewery	Hesketh 308	Ford Cosworth DFV 3.0 V8	ARG	BRA	RSA	ESP	MON	BEL	SWE	NED	FRA	GBR	GER; 8	AUT; Ret	ITA; 9	USA				NC	0
1976	Hesketh Racing	Hesketh 308D	Ford Cosworth DFV 3.0 V8	BRA	RSA; 15	USW; DNQ	ESP; DNQ	BEL; Ret	MON; DNQ	SWE; Ret	FRA; Ret	GBR; 7	GER; Ret	AUT; 8	NED; Ret	ITA; 16	CAN; DNS	USA; 13	JPN; 8		NC	0
1977	Hesketh Racing	Hesketh 308E	Ford Cosworth DFV 3.0 V8	ARG	BRA	RSA	USW	ESP; Ret	MON; DNQ	BEL; 9	SWE; 16	FRA; DNQ	GBR	GER	AUT	NED	ITA	USA	CAN	JPN	NC	0
1978	Sachs Racing	Ensign N177	Ford Cosworth DFV 3.0 V8	ARG	BRA	RSA	USW	MON	BEL	ESP	SWE	FRA	GBR	GER; 11	AUT; Ret	NED; DNPQ					NC	0
1978	ATS Engineering	ATS HS1	Ford Cosworth DFV 3.0 V8														ITA; DNQ*	USA	CAN		NC	0
1980	Team ATS	ATS D4	Ford Cosworth DFV 3.0 V8	ARG	BRA	RSA	USW	BEL	MON	FRA	GBR	GER; DNQ	AUT	NED	ITA	CAN	USA				NC	0

* Ertl had failed to pre-qualify for this race in his Ensign, then took part in qualifying sessions in the ATS, and again failed to qualify.
