= Harvey Postlethwaite =

British car designer (1944–1999)

- Postlethwaite in the late 1990s
- Born: 4 March 1944; Barnet, England
- Died: 15 April 1999 (aged 55); Barcelona, Spain
- Education: Royal Masonic School for Boys
- Alma mater: University of Birmingham
- Occupations: Aerodynamicist, engineer, Technical Director
- Known for: Scuderia Ferrari, Tyrrell, Hesketh, Honda F1 project.
- Spouse: Cherry Postlethwaite
- Children: 2

Harvey Ernest Postlethwaite (4 March 1944 – 15 April 1999) was a British engineer and Technical Director of several Formula One teams during the 1970s, 1980s and 1990s. He died of a heart attack in Spain while supervising the testing of the aborted Honda F1 project.

== Early career ==
After leaving the Royal Masonic School for Boys, Harvey Postlethwaite attended the University of Birmingham, England to study mechanical engineering and graduated, with a BSc and then a doctorate, during the 1960s. He was a keen follower of motor sport, competing in a Mallock at club level for a while. After graduation Postlethwaite joined ICI as a research scientist, but bored by this he soon began to pursue a career as a race car engineer, joining March in 1970, then aged just 26. Postlethwaite worked on the fledgling company's Formula 2 and Formula 3 cars but was lured away to join the Hesketh Formula One team who were a March customer. The Hesketh team was well known for an unconventional approach to Formula One—Postlethwaite was himself considered 'eccentric':

"The Doc's explanation of his move to Hesketh was that 'They got me drunk'."

== Formula One ==
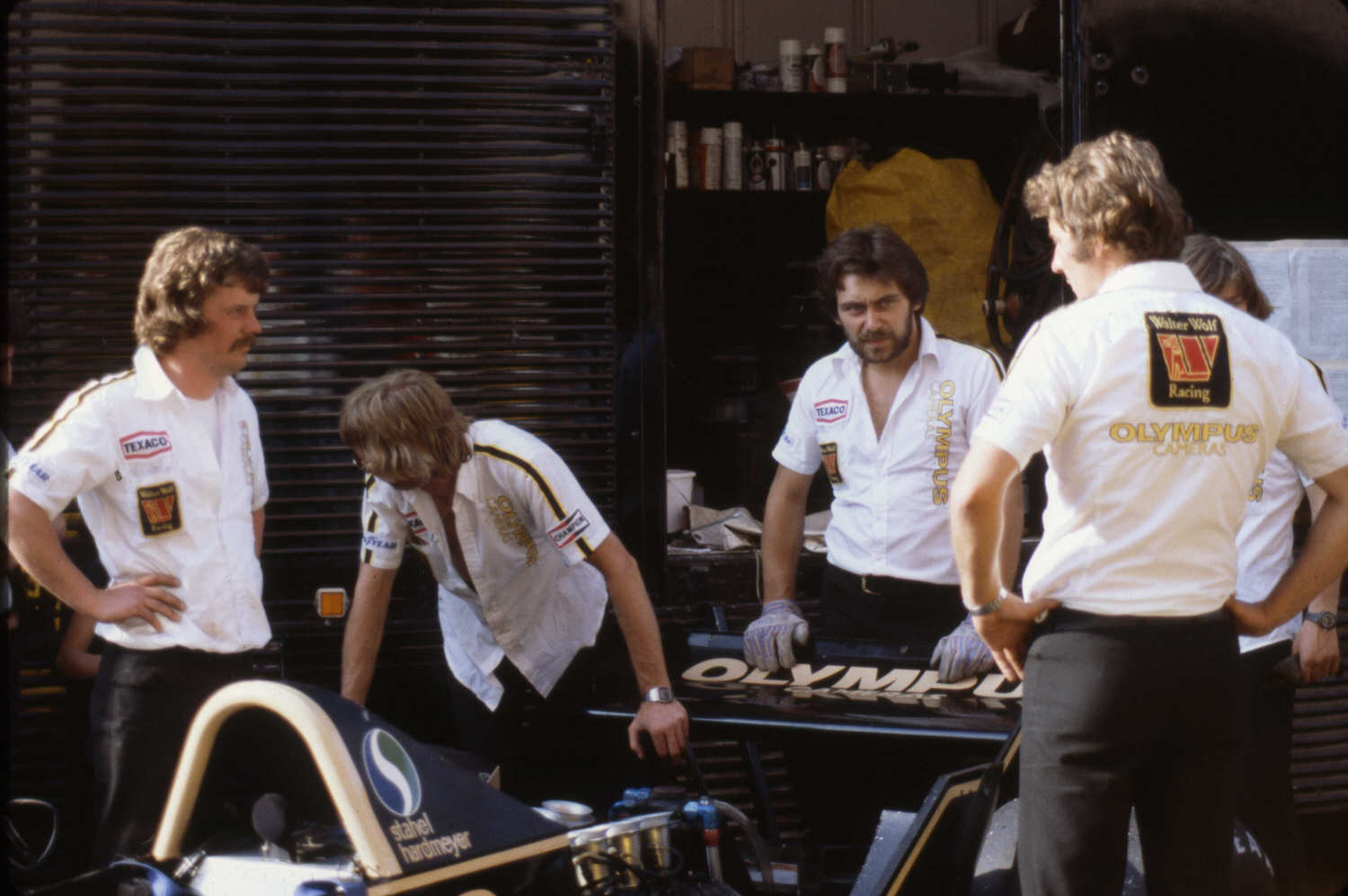
Postlewaite (right, facing away from the camera) and the Wolf Racing team at the 1979 Monaco Grand Prix

Working to modify and improve the novice team's March 731 chassis, Postlethwaite elevated the team into serious contention and the following year designed the team's car from scratch. 'Doc' Postlethwaite's 1974 Hesketh 308 secured a number of podium positions. The following year he further developed the car's unusual rubber spring suspension and saw his creation take victory at the Dutch Grand Prix in the hands of James Hunt.

By 1976 Lord Hesketh could no longer afford to run the team and sold out. Postlethwaite went with his cars to the newly founded Wolf–Williams Racing, headed by Walter Wolf and Frank Williams, but the results were poor and the owners soon went their separate ways. Postlethwaite remained with Wolf, designing the team's 1977 challenger, the WR1.

Success was immediate with Jody Scheckter taking victory at the season's opening race. Two more wins and a number of podium results followed and Scheckter eventually finished second in the Drivers' Championship.

Although Postlethwaite remained with the team until 1979 they were never to repeat their 1977 success. When Walter Wolf closed the team down at the end of 1979 he transferred, along with the Wolf cars and driver Keke Rosberg to the Fittipaldi Automotive team. He produced a new design, the F8, for the latter half of 1980 but left to join Ferrari in early 1981. At the time the Italian team were considered amongst the best engine and gearbox builders in the sport, but amongst the worst chassis designers. Postlethwaite was selected personally by Enzo Ferrari to rectify this problem and by the following year everything was in place for success.

The 1982 126C2 Ferrari took the Constructors' title despite several serious setbacks, including the practice crash at Zolder which claimed the life of Gilles Villeneuve. Despite the loss of their inspirational Canadian driver, Postlethwaite's updated design, the 126C2B, took the Constructors' title again in 1983.

Postlethwaite remained with Ferrari until 1987. After 1983 his cars took several more wins, but were unable to compete with McLaren and Williams for title victory. He was eventually replaced by John Barnard and moved to Tyrrell, where he worked for four years. During his tenure as technical director Tyrrell's results improved noticeably, culminating in the 1990 season opener in Phoenix, where Jean Alesi was able to challenge Ayrton Senna's McLaren for victory and finished second in a Tyrrell 018. Alesi repeated the feat in Postlethwaite's novel 019 – the first of the 'high nose' Formula One cars – at Monaco. At the car's launch Postlethwaite proved the structural integrity of its unusual front 'gull wing' by standing on it. While at Tyrrell Postlethwaite employed Mike Gascoyne, who became his assistant and protégé.

In 1991, Postlethwaite was signed as technical director of the Sauber team who planned to enter Formula One in 1993. Taking Gascoyne with him, Postlethwaite relocated to Switzerland and designed the team's first car. Despite leaving Sauber before the start of 1993, the designer's car went on to considerable success in the hands of JJ Lehto and Karl Wendlinger regularly scoring points.

Postlethwaite moved back to Tyrrell in 1994 where he remained until 1998 when the team was sold to become British American Racing. Although by the late 1980s and 1990s Tyrrell was a small, and largely uncompetitive team, the designer remained well respected within the sport and was hired as technical director of the abortive in-house Honda F1 project in 1999. Although Honda had not committed to race in Formula One the project produced an evaluation car, designed by Postlethwaite and built by Dallara, and it was during testing of this car at Barcelona in Spain that he suffered a fatal heart attack. The project was subsequently discontinued, although Honda began supplying engines again from the 2000 season onwards, eventually taking over the BAR team for 2006.

== Personal life ==
Postlethwaite was married to Cherry, with whom he had two children.
