= 1976 French Grand Prix =

Race 8 of 16 in the 1976 Formula One season
← Previous race	Next race →
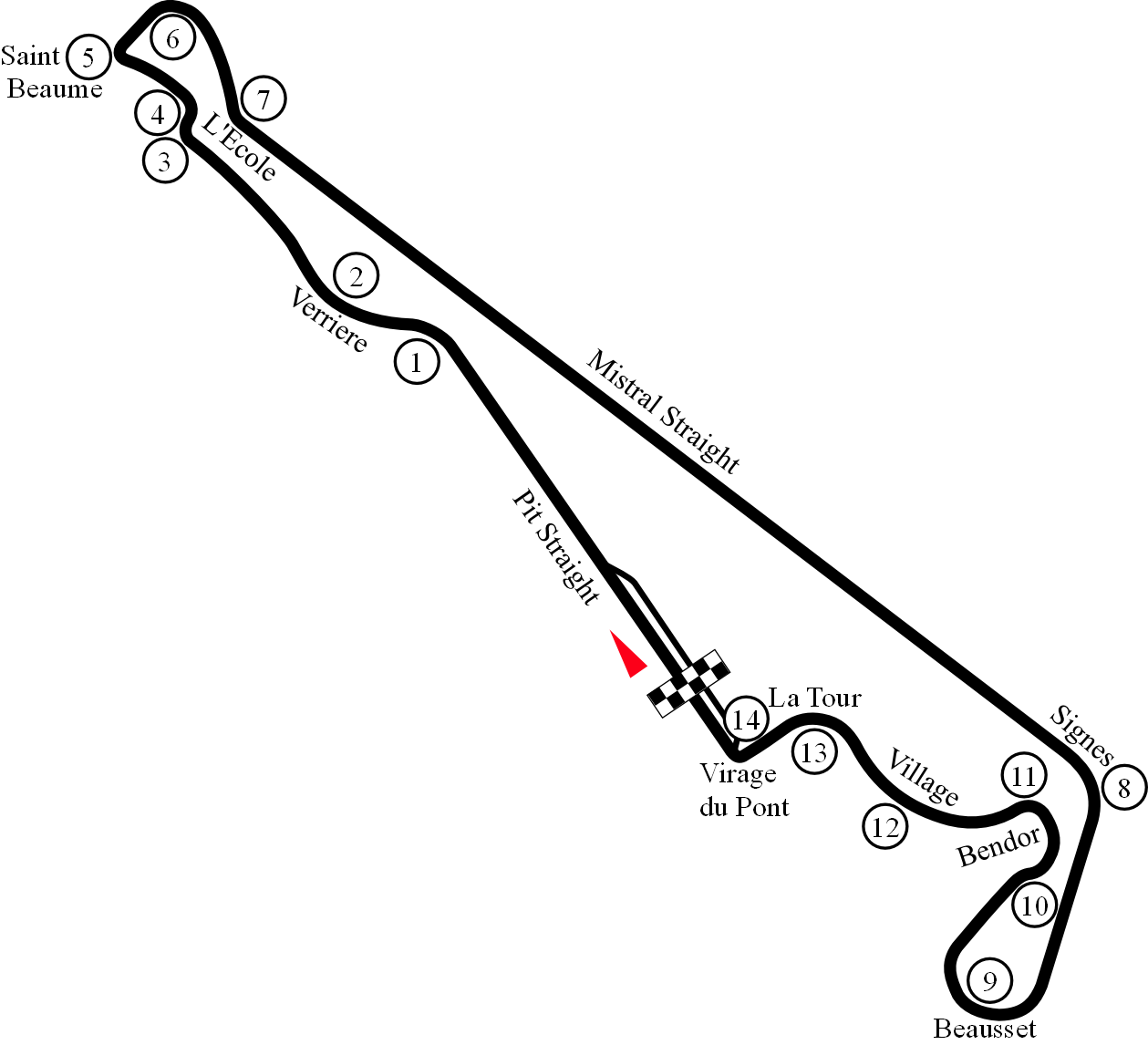

Race details
- Date: 4 July 1976
- Official name: LXII Grand Prix de France
- Location: Circuit Paul Ricard; Le Castellet, Var, France
- Course: Permanent racing facility
- Course length: 5.809 km (3.610 miles)
- Distance: 54 laps, 313.686 km (194.915 miles)

Pole position
Driver	(United Kingdom) James Hunt	McLaren-Ford
- Time: 1:47.89

Fastest lap
Driver	(Austria) Niki Lauda	Ferrari
- Time: 1:51.0 on lap 4

Podium
First	(United Kingdom) James Hunt	McLaren-Ford
Second	(France) Patrick Depailler	Tyrrell-Ford
Third	(United Kingdom) John Watson	Penske-Ford

The 1976 French Grand Prix was a Formula One motor race held at the Circuit Paul Ricard in Le Castellet, near Marseille in France, on 4 July 1976. It was the eighth race of the 1976 World Championship of F1 Drivers and the 1976 International Cup for F1 Constructors. It was the 54th French Grand Prix and the fourth to be held at Paul Ricard. The race was held over 54 laps of the 5.8-kilometre (3.6 mi) circuit for a race distance of 313 kilometres (194 mi).

The race was won by eventual 1976 world champion James Hunt driving a McLaren M23. Hunt won by twelve seconds over the Tyrrell P34 of Patrick Depailler. It was Hunt's second win for the year and his third career Grand Prix victory, although at this stage his appeal against disqualification from the Spanish Grand Prix win had yet to be upheld. Eleven seconds further back in third was John Watson driving a Penske PC4. It was the first podium finish for both Watson and Penske, although the result only came after Ronnie Peterson's March 761 stopped with three laps to go and after Watson was disqualified for a rear wing irregularity and subsequently reinstated upon appeal.

Fourth place was taken by young Brazilian driver Carlos Pace driving a Brabham BT45 ahead of Mario Andretti (Lotus 77) and the Tyrrell P34 of Jody Scheckter.

Reigning champion Niki Lauda retired his Ferrari 312T2 with an engine failure while leading. While Hunt would eventually prove to be the challenger to Lauda for the 1976 championship Lauda's points lead at this time was over the Tyrrell pair of Patrick Depailler (26 points) and Scheckter (24 points).

== Classification ==
=== Qualifying ===
Pos	No	Driver	Constructor	Time	Gap
1	11	(United Kingdom) James Hunt	McLaren-Ford	1:47.89	—
2	1	(Austria) Niki Lauda	Ferrari	1:48.17	+0.28
3	4	(France) Patrick Depailler	Tyrrell-Ford	1:48.59	+0.70
4	2	(Switzerland) Clay Regazzoni	Ferrari	1:48.69	+0.80
5	8	(Brazil) Carlos Pace	Brabham-Alfa Romeo	1:48.75	+0.86
6	10	(Sweden) Ronnie Peterson	March-Ford	1:49.07	+1.18
7	5	(United States) Mario Andretti	Lotus-Ford	1:49.19	+1.30
8	28	(United Kingdom) John Watson	Penske-Ford	1:49.22	+1.33
9	3	(South Africa) Jody Scheckter	Tyrrell-Ford	1:49.63	+1.74
10	7	(Argentina) Carlos Reutemann	Brabham-Alfa Romeo	1:49.79	+1.90
11	9	(Italy) Vittorio Brambilla	March-Ford	1:49.79	+1.90
12	6	(Sweden) Gunnar Nilsson	Lotus-Ford	1:49.83	+1.94
13	26	(France) Jacques Laffite	Ligier-Matra	1:50.06	+2.17
14	12	(West Germany) Jochen Mass	McLaren-Ford	1:50.10	+2.21
15	17	(France) Jean-Pierre Jarier	Shadow-Ford	1:50.12	+2.23
16	16	(United Kingdom) Tom Pryce	Shadow-Ford	1:50.27	+2.38
17	34	(West Germany) Hans-Joachim Stuck	March-Ford	1:50.31	+2.42
18	19	(Australia) Alan Jones	Surtees-Ford	1:51.11	+3.22
19	20	(Belgium) Jacky Ickx	Wolf-Williams-Ford	1:51.41	+3.52
20	35	(Italy) Arturo Merzario	March-Ford	1:51.79	+3.90
21	30	(Brazil) Emerson Fittipaldi	Fittipaldi-Ford	1:52.11	+4.22
22	21	(France) Michel Leclère	Wolf-Williams-Ford	1:52.29	+4.40
23	18	(United States) Brett Lunger	Surtees-Ford	1:52.41	+4.52
24	38	(France) Henri Pescarolo	Surtees-Ford	1:52.60	+4.71
25	25	(United Kingdom) Guy Edwards	Hesketh-Ford	1:52.63	+4.74
26	22	(Belgium) Patrick Nève	Ensign-Ford	1:52.82	+4.93
27	33	(United Kingdom) Damien Magee	Brabham-Ford	1:53.49	+5.60
28	31	(Brazil) Ingo Hoffmann	Fittipaldi-Ford	1:53.78	+5.89
29	24	(Austria) Harald Ertl	Hesketh-Ford	1:53.79	+5.90
30	32	(Switzerland) Loris Kessel	Brabham-Ford	1:55.30	+7.41

*Drivers with a red background failed to qualify. Ertl had failed to qualify, but he had started on the back of the grid.

=== Race ===
Pos	No	Driver	Constructor	Laps	Time/Retired	Grid	Points
1	11	(United Kingdom) James Hunt	McLaren-Ford	54	1:40:58.60	1	9
2	4	(France) Patrick Depailler	Tyrrell-Ford	54	+ 12.70	3	6
3	28	(United Kingdom) John Watson	Penske-Ford	54	+ 23.55	8	4
4	8	(Brazil) Carlos Pace	Brabham-Alfa Romeo	54	+ 24.82	5	3
5	5	(United States) Mario Andretti	Lotus-Ford	54	+ 43.92	7	2
6	3	(South Africa) Jody Scheckter	Tyrrell-Ford	54	+ 55.07	9	1
7	34	(West Germany) Hans-Joachim Stuck	March-Ford	54	+ 1:21.55	17	
8	16	(United Kingdom) Tom Pryce	Shadow-Ford	54	+ 1:30.67	16	
9	35	(Italy) Arturo Merzario	March-Ford	54	+ 1:53.57	20	
10	20	(Belgium) Jacky Ickx	Wolf-Williams-Ford	53	+ 1 Lap	19	
11	7	(Argentina) Carlos Reutemann	Brabham-Alfa Romeo	53	+ 1 Lap	10	
12	17	(France) Jean-Pierre Jarier	Shadow-Ford	53	+ 1 Lap	15	
13	21	(France) Michel Leclère	Wolf-Williams-Ford	53	+ 1 Lap	22	
14	26	(France) Jacques Laffite	Ligier-Matra	53	+ 1 Lap	13	
15	12	(West Germany) Jochen Mass	McLaren-Ford	53	+ 1 Lap	14	
16	18	(United States) Brett Lunger	Surtees-Ford	53	+ 1 Lap	23	
17	25	(United Kingdom) Guy Edwards	Hesketh-Ford	53	+ 1 Lap	25	
18	22	(Belgium) Patrick Nève	Ensign-Ford	53	+ 1 Lap	26	
19	10	(Sweden) Ronnie Peterson	March-Ford	51	Fuel System	6	
Ret	19	(Australia) Alan Jones	Surtees-Ford	44	Suspension	18	
Ret	9	(Italy) Vittorio Brambilla	March-Ford	28	Oil Pressure	11	
Ret	30	(Brazil) Emerson Fittipaldi	Fittipaldi-Ford	21	Oil Pressure	21	
Ret	38	(France) Henri Pescarolo	Surtees-Ford	19	Suspension	24	
Ret	2	(Switzerland) Clay Regazzoni	Ferrari	17	Engine	4	
Ret	1	(Austria) Niki Lauda	Ferrari	8	Engine	2	
Ret	6	(Sweden) Gunnar Nilsson	Lotus-Ford	8	Gearbox	12	
Ret	24	(Austria) Harald Ertl	Hesketh-Ford	4	Differential	27	

== Notes ==
- This was the Formula One World Championship debut for Belgian driver Patrick Nève.
- This was the 25th Grand Prix start for British constructor Ensign.
- This was the 1st podium finish for Penske.

== Championship standings after the race ==
Drivers' Championship standings

	Pos	Driver	Points
	1	(Austria) Niki Lauda	55
1	2	(France) Patrick Depailler	26
1	3	(South Africa) Jody Scheckter	24
4	4	(United Kingdom) James Hunt	17
1	5	(Switzerland) Clay Regazzoni	16

Constructors' Championship standings

Pos	Constructor	Points
1	(Italy) Ferrari	58
2	(United Kingdom) Tyrrell-Ford	37
3	(United Kingdom) McLaren-Ford	23
4	(France) Ligier-Matra	10
5	(United Kingdom) Lotus-Ford	8

- Note: Only the top five positions are included for both sets of standings. Only the best 7 results from the first 8 races and the best 7 results from the last 8 races counted towards the Championship. Points accurate at final declaration of results: before the next race in Britain, Hunt was reinstated as the winner of the Spanish Grand Prix.

Previous race: 1976 Swedish Grand Prix	FIA Formula One World Championship; 1976 season	Next race: 1976 British Grand Prix
Previous race: 1975 French Grand Prix	French Grand Prix	Next race: 1977 French Grand Prix
