= 1976 Belgian Grand Prix =

Race 5 of 16 in the 1976 Formula One season
← Previous race	Next race →

Race details
- Date: May 16, 1976
- Official name: XXXIV Grote Prijs van Belgie
- Location: Circuit Zolder, Heusden-Zolder, Belgium
- Course length: 4.262 km (2.648 miles)
- Distance: 70 laps, 298.34 km (185.38 miles)

Pole position
Driver	(Austria) Niki Lauda	Ferrari
- Time: 1:26.55

Fastest lap
Driver	(Austria) Niki Lauda	Ferrari
- Time: 1:25.98

Podium
First	(Austria) Niki Lauda	Ferrari
Second	(Switzerland) Clay Regazzoni	Ferrari
Third	(France) Jacques Laffite	Ligier-Matra

The 1976 Belgian Grand Prix was a Formula One motor race held at Zolder, near Heusden-Zolder in Belgium on 16 May 1976. The race was the fifth round of the 1976 Formula One season. It was the 34th Belgian Grand Prix and the third to be held at Circuit Zolder. Zolder was a replacement venue as Nivelles-Baulers near Brussels was due to host the race in rotation with Zolder but the track surface at Nivelles had deteriorated and Zolder would host the race until the return of Circuit de Spa-Francorchamps in 1983. The race was held over 70 laps of the 4.3-kilometre circuit for a total race distance of 298 kilometres.

The race was won by Ferrari driver, Niki Lauda driving a Ferrari 312T2, who increased his lead in the World Drivers' Championship to 29 points by doing so. His Swiss teammate, Clay Regazzoni, finished the race in second position, 3.4 seconds behind Lauda. Third was taken by French driver Jacques Laffite driving a Ligier JS5. It was Lauda's fourth win of the year in what was a dominant display by the reigning champion. Laffite's third place was his second podium after finishing second in the 1975 German Grand Prix the previous year and the first such finish for the new Équipe Ligier team.

== Qualifying ==
=== Qualifying classification ===
Pos.	Driver	Constructor	Time	No
1	Niki Lauda	Ferrari	1:26.55	1
2	Clay Regazzoni	Ferrari	1:26.60	2
3	James Hunt	McLaren-Ford	1:26.74	3
4	Patrick Depailler	Tyrrell-Ford	1:26.91	4
5	Vittorio Brambilla	March-Ford	1:26.93	5
6	Jacques Laffite	Ligier-Matra	1:27.14	6
7	Jody Scheckter	Tyrrell-Ford	1:27.19	7
8	Chris Amon	Ensign-Ford	1:27.54	8
9	Carlos Pace	Brabham-Alfa Romeo	1:27.66	9
10	Ronnie Peterson	March-Ford	1:27.72	10
11	Mario Andretti	Lotus-Ford	1:27.75	11
12	Carlos Reutemann	Brabham-Alfa Romeo	1:28.30	12
13	Tom Pryce	Shadow-Ford	1:28.37	13
14	Jean-Pierre Jarier	Shadow-Ford	1:28.38	14
15	Hans-Joachim Stuck	March-Ford	1:28.41	15
16	Alan Jones	Surtees-Ford	1:28.44	16
17	John Watson	Penske-Ford	1:28.44	17
18	Jochen Mass	McLaren-Ford	1:28.50	18
19	Patrick Nève	Brabham-Ford	1:28.80	19
20	Larry Perkins	Boro-Ford	1:28.81	20
21	Arturo Merzario	March-Ford	1:28.84	21
22	Gunnar Nilsson	Lotus-Ford	1:28.99	22
23	Loris Kessel	Brabham-Ford	1:29.09	23
24	Harald Ertl	Hesketh-Ford	1:29.40	24
25	Michel Leclère	Wolf-Williams-Ford	1:29.46	25
26	Brett Lunger	Surtees-Ford	1:29.76	26
27	Emerson Fittipaldi	Copersucar-Ford	1:29.81	—
28	Jacky Ickx	Wolf-Williams-Ford	1:30.61	—
29	Guy Edwards	Hesketh-Ford	1:30.77	—

*Drivers with a red background failed to qualify

== Race ==
=== Race summary ===
Ferrari had locked out the front row in qualifying, with Lauda on pole from Regazzoni. Lauda motored away as the start, with Hunt up to second but Regazzoni soon took the place back. The Ferraris raced away, and Hunt dropped to sixth position, behind Jacques Laffite's Ligier and the two six-wheeled Tyrrell P34s, before eventually retiring with a transmission failure. Patrick Depailler also retired when his engine blew up. Lauda won, and Regazzoni completed a dominant Ferrari 1–2. Laffite inherited third with the retirements of James Hunt (McLaren M23) and Depailler. Jody Scheckter finished fourth in his Tyrrell. A lap behind, future world champion Alan Jones took his second points finish in his Surtees TS19 with Jochen Mass collecting the final point in the second McLaren after Chris Amon's Ensign N176 shed a wheel and rolled.

=== Classification ===
Pos	No	Driver	Constructor	Laps	Time/Retired	Grid	Points
1	1	(Austria) Niki Lauda	Ferrari	70	1:42:53.23	1	9
2	2	(Switzerland) Clay Regazzoni	Ferrari	70	+ 3.46	2	6
3	26	(France) Jacques Laffite	Ligier-Matra	70	+ 35.38	6	4
4	3	(South Africa) Jody Scheckter	Tyrrell-Ford	70	+ 1:31.00	7	3
5	19	(Australia) Alan Jones	Surtees-Ford	69	+ 1 Lap	16	2
6	12	(Germany) Jochen Mass	McLaren-Ford	69	+ 1 Lap	18	1
7	28	(United Kingdom) John Watson	Penske-Ford	69	+ 1 Lap	17	
8	37	(Australia) Larry Perkins	Boro-Ford	69	+ 1 Lap	20	
9	17	(France) Jean-Pierre Jarier	Shadow-Ford	69	+ 1 Lap	14	
10	16	(United Kingdom) Tom Pryce	Shadow-Ford	68	+ 2 Laps	13	
11	21	(France) Michel Leclère	Wolf-Williams-Ford	68	+ 2 Laps	25	
12	32	(Switzerland) Loris Kessel	Brabham-Ford	63	+ 7 Laps	23	
Ret	18	(United States) Brett Lunger	Surtees-Ford	62	Electrical	26	
Ret	8	(Brazil) Carlos Pace	Brabham-Alfa Romeo	58	Electrical	9	
Ret	22	(New Zealand) Chris Amon	Ensign-Ford	51	Accident	8	
Ret	11	(United Kingdom) James Hunt	McLaren-Ford	35	Gearbox	3	
Ret	34	(Germany) Hans Joachim Stuck	March-Ford	33	Suspension	15	
Ret	24	(Austria) Harald Ertl	Hesketh-Ford	31	Engine	24	
Ret	4	(France) Patrick Depailler	Tyrrell-Ford	29	Engine	4	
Ret	5	(United States) Mario Andretti	Lotus-Ford	28	Halfshaft	11	
Ret	33	(Belgium) Patrick Nève	Brabham-Ford	26	Halfshaft	19	
Ret	35	(Italy) Arturo Merzario	March-Ford	21	Engine	21	
Ret	7	(Argentina) Carlos Reutemann	Brabham-Alfa Romeo	17	Engine	12	
Ret	10	(Sweden) Ronnie Peterson	March-Ford	16	Accident	10	
Ret	6	(Sweden) Gunnar Nilsson	Lotus-Ford	7	Accident	22	
Ret	9	(Italy) Vittorio Brambilla	March-Ford	6	Halfshaft	5	
DNQ	30	(Brazil) Emerson Fittipaldi	Fittipaldi-Ford				
DNQ	20	(Belgium) Jacky Ickx	Wolf-Williams-Ford				
DNQ	25	(United Kingdom) Guy Edwards	Hesketh-Ford				

== Notes ==
- This was the 10th fastest lap set by an Austrian driver.
- This was the 1st podium finish for French constructor Ligier.
- For the first time since the 1971 Dutch Grand Prix, a Ford-powered car did not end on the podium. This ended a record streak of 67 consecutive podium finishes for the engine supplier.

== Championship standings after the race ==
Points are accurate at the conclusion of the race and do not include amended results of the 1976 Spanish Grand Prix as it was under appeal.

Drivers' Championship standings

	Pos	Driver	Points
	1	(Austria) Niki Lauda	42
1	2	(Switzerland) Clay Regazzoni	15
1	3	(France) Patrick Depailler	10
	4	(Germany) Jochen Mass	8
1	5	(South Africa) Jody Scheckter	8

Constructors' Championship standings

	Pos	Constructor	Points
	1	(Italy) Ferrari	45
	2	(United Kingdom) Tyrrell-Ford	16
	3	(United Kingdom) McLaren-Ford	10
3	4	(France) Ligier-Matra	7
1	5	(United Kingdom) Lotus-Ford	6

- Note: Only the top five positions are included for both sets of standings.

Previous race: 1976 Spanish Grand Prix	FIA Formula One World Championship; 1976 season	Next race: 1976 Monaco Grand Prix
Previous race: 1975 Belgian Grand Prix	Belgian Grand Prix	Next race: 1977 Belgian Grand Prix
