= Hesketh 308 =

Formula One motor racing car

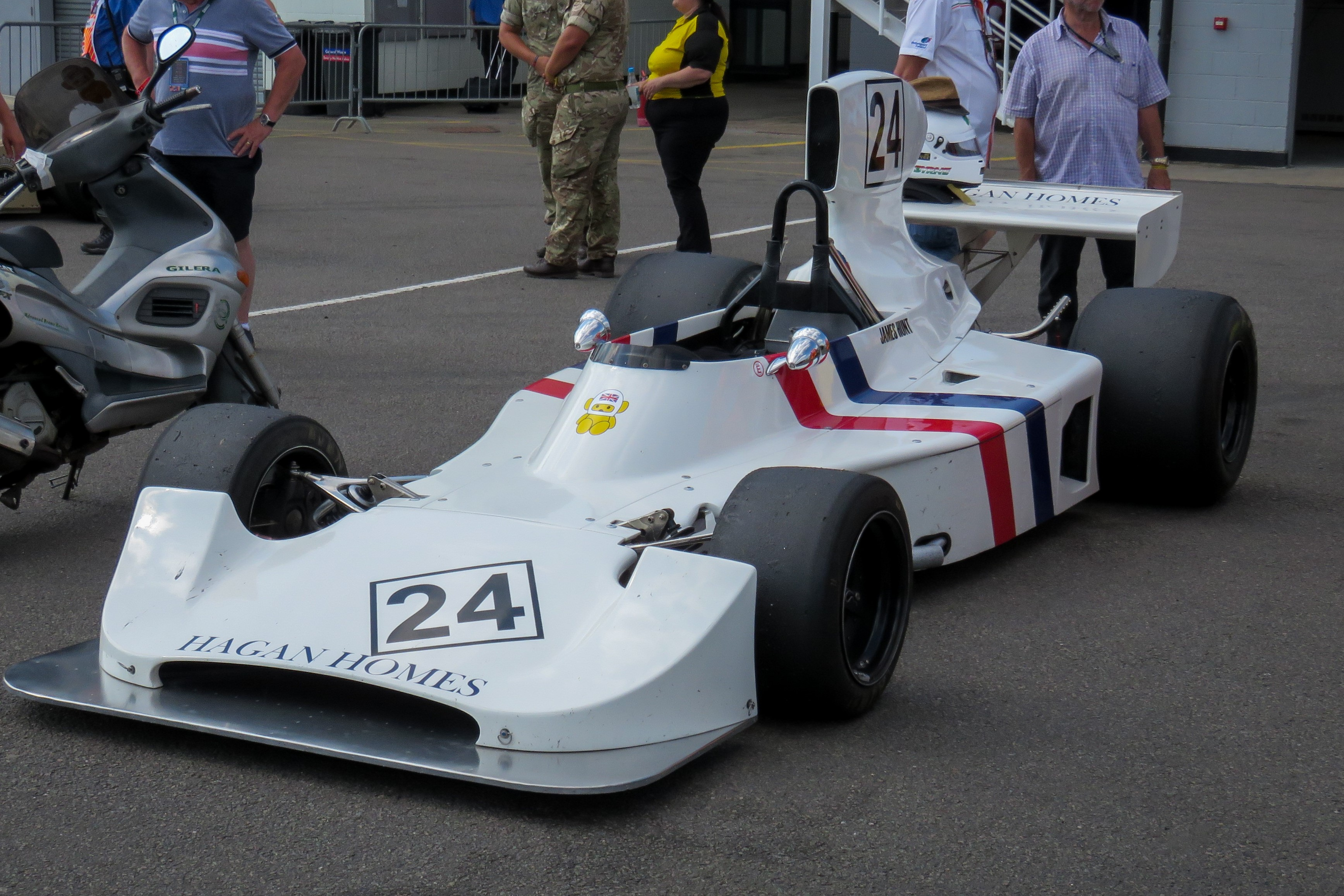
The 308 of James Hunt in 2018.

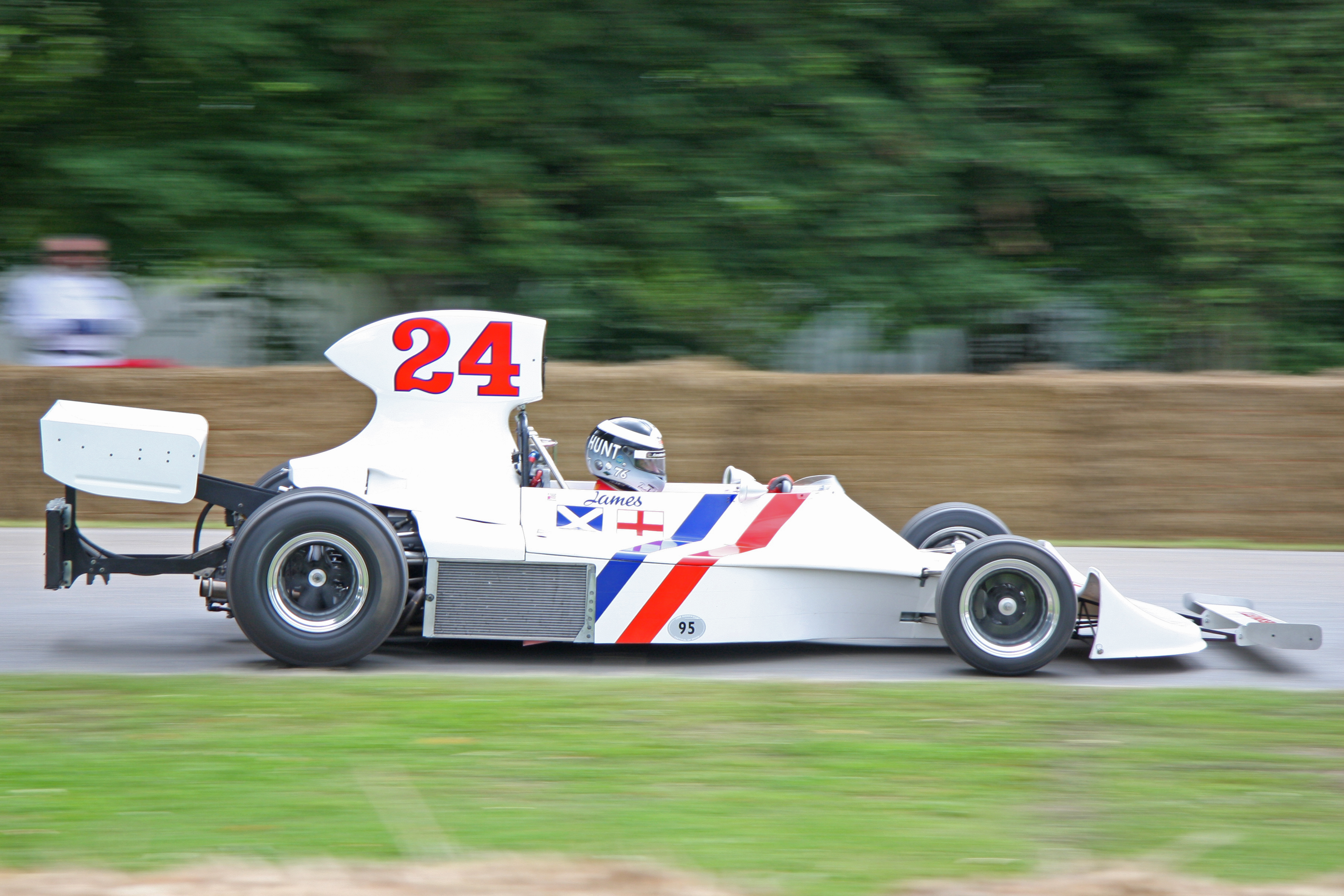
Freddie Hunt demonstrating the 308B at the 2008 Goodwood Festival of Speed.

The Hesketh 308 and its derived sister model the 308B are Formula One racing cars designed by Harvey Postlethwaite for Hesketh Racing to compete in the 1974 and 1975 World Championships. The car gave James Hunt his first World Championship Grand Prix win in the 1975 Dutch Grand Prix at Zandvoort.

The 308 replaced the ageing March 731 chassis that the team had been using since coming into Formula 1 the previous season, and was loosely based on the March design. It was powered by the Ford-Cosworth DFV and when the car was first launched featured conventional front suspension comprising double wishbones with outboard mounted coil-spring damper units. Postlethwaite was looking for a way of fitting simple, lightweight progressive springing to the car and latched onto the idea of using rubber springs after a friend involved in designing rubber damping for buildings in earthquake zones suggested the idea. Early tests in 1974 proved unsuccessful until a special non-creep rubber was developed by the Malaysian Rubber Producers Association. This was formed into springs by the Aeon Products company and following more productive testing results, fitted to the car from the 1975 Argentine GP. Originally, Lord Hesketh had plans to fund and have built a V12 engine to accompany the car, but this never came to pass, and the DFV V8 was used exclusively. Four chassis were built over the three seasons the car competed.

On its debut appearance at the 1974 Brands Hatch, Race of Champions, Hunt put the car in pole position. The race was less successful and Hunt spun out in wet conditions on lap four. The 308 made its first Grand Prix appearance two weeks later in South Africa. This time Hunt could only qualify 13th but moved up to fifth place from the start, successfully holding that position until drive shaft failure put him out of the race on lap 65. The following week, Hunt again managed pole position at the International Trophy race at Silverstone in competition with several Grand Prix regulars. This time Hunt managed a stunning victory. From the start, Hunt dropped back with his clutch slipping and with the gear shift knob coming off in his hand. Gradually he overcame these difficulties and worked his way back to the front, eventually passing Ronnie Peterson's Lotus down the inside into Woodcote corner to retake the lead.

This early success for the 308 was not repeated, and as the Grand Prix season progressed, the car proved itself to be quick but unreliable, failing several times with a variety of transmission breakages. Hunt also found himself eliminated in accidents with Tom Pryce, firstly in the Netherlands where Pryce collided with him at the first corner, and then two weeks later in France – although this time Pryce was forced into Hunt after he himself had been hit by Carlos Reutemann. Hesketh continued to steer the team towards greater levels of professionalism, and towards the end of the season, Ian Scheckter was entered in a second car for the Austrian race. Although, largely thanks to engine trouble, Scheckter failed to qualify, some within the team felt that running two cars would do much to improve the team's chances for the following season.

For 1975 the 308 was updated to 308B specifications, with revised bodywork and repositioned oil radiators. The car was even more competitive and Hunt challenged for the victory in Argentina and Brazil before he broke his and the team's duck at the 1975 Dutch Grand Prix. It would be the team's only win however. He rounded off the season with several solid placings, which helped Hesketh finish fourth in the constructors' championship. The team folded at the end of the season as Hesketh could not afford to keep financing his unsponsored team, and Hunt moved to McLaren for 1976.

The 308 and 308B cars were sold to privateer teams who achieved little success. Perhaps the most famous post-Hunt Hesketh driver was Guy Edwards who arranged sponsorship with adult magazine Penthouse for 1976, which gained considerable exposure for the team. Edwards tried hard with the car, but did not score any points.

== Complete Formula One World Championship results ==
(key) (Races in bold indicate pole position, races in italics indicate fastest lap)

Year	Entrants	Chassis	Engines	Tyres	Drivers	1	2	3	4	5	6	7	8	9	10	11	12	13	14	15	Points	WCC
1974	Hesketh Racing	308	Cosworth DFV; V8 NA	F		ARG	BRA	RSA	ESP	BEL	MON	SWE	NED	FRA	GBR	GER	AUT	ITA	CAN	USA	15	6th
1974	Hesketh Racing	308	Cosworth DFV; V8 NA	F	(United Kingdom) James Hunt			Ret	10	Ret	Ret	3	Ret	Ret	Ret	Ret	3	Ret	4	3	15	6th
1974	Hesketh Racing	308	Cosworth DFV; V8 NA	F	(South Africa) Ian Scheckter												DNQ				15	6th
1975	Hesketh Racing	308B	Cosworth DFV; V8 NA	G		ARG	BRA	RSA	ESP	MON	BEL	SWE	NED	FRA	GBR	GER	AUT	ITA	USA		33	4th
1975	Hesketh Racing	308B	Cosworth DFV; V8 NA	G	(United Kingdom) James Hunt	2	6	Ret	Ret	Ret	Ret	Ret	1	2	4	Ret	2				33	4th
1975	Hesketh Racing	308B	Cosworth DFV; V8 NA	G	(United States) Brett Lunger												13	13	Ret		33	4th
1975	Custom Made Harry Stiller Racing	308B	Cosworth DFV; V8 NA	G	(Australia) Alan Jones				Ret	Ret	Ret	11									33	4th
1975	Polar Caravans	308B	Cosworth DFV; V8 NA	G	(Sweden) Torsten Palm					DNQ		10									33	4th
1975	Warsteiner Brewery	308B	Cosworth DFV; V8 NA	G	(Austria) Harald Ertl											8	Ret	9			33	4th
