= 1976 Monaco Grand Prix =

Coordinates: 43°44′4.74″N 7°25′16.8″E

Race 6 of 16 in the 1976 Formula One season
| ← Previous race | Next race → |
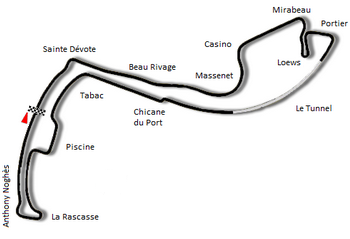

Race details
- Date: 30 May 1976
- Official name: XXXIV Grand Prix Automobile de Monaco
- Location: Circuit de Monaco, Monte Carlo, Monaco
- Course: Street circuit
- Course length: 3.312 km (2.057 miles)
- Distance: 78 laps, 258.336 km (160.522 miles)
- Weather: Dry

Pole position
| Driver | (Austria) Niki Lauda | Ferrari |
- Time: 1:29.65

Fastest lap
| Driver | (Switzerland) Clay Regazzoni | Ferrari |
- Time: 1:30.28 on lap 60

Podium
| First | (Austria) Niki Lauda | Ferrari |
| Second | (South Africa) Jody Scheckter | Tyrrell-Ford |
| Third | (France) Patrick Depailler | Tyrrell-Ford |

The 1976 Monaco Grand Prix (formally the XXXIV Grand Prix de Monaco) was a Formula One motor race held at the Monaco street circuit in Monaco on 30 May 1976. It was the sixth round of the 1976 Formula One season and the 34th Monaco Grand Prix. The race was contested over 78 laps of the 3.3 km circuit for a race distance of 257 kilometres.

The race was won by Ferrari driver Niki Lauda, who had also taken pole position in his Ferrari 312T2.

== Qualifying ==
=== Qualifying classification ===
| Pos. | No. | Driver | Constructor | Time |
|---|---|---|---|---|
| 1 | 1 | (Austria) Niki Lauda | Ferrari | 1:29.65 |
| 2 | 2 | (Switzerland) Clay Regazzoni | Ferrari | 1:29.91 |
| 3 | 10 | (Sweden) Ronnie Peterson | March-Ford | 1:30.08 |
| 4 | 4 | (France) Patrick Depailler | Tyrrell-Ford | 1:30.33 |
| 5 | 3 | (South Africa) Jody Scheckter | Tyrrell-Ford | 1:30.55 |
| 6 | 34 | (West Germany) Hans-Joachim Stuck | March-Ford | 1:30.66 |
| 7 | 30 | (Brazil) Emerson Fittipaldi | Fittipaldi-Ford | 1:31.39 |
| 8 | 26 | (France) Jacques Laffite | Ligier-Matra | 1:31.46 |
| 9 | 9 | (Italy) Vittorio Brambilla | March-Ford | 1:31.47 |
| 10 | 17 | (France) Jean-Pierre Jarier | Shadow-Ford | 1:31.65 |
| 11 | 12 | (Germany) Jochen Mass | McLaren-Ford | 1:31.67 |
| 12 | 22 | (New Zealand) Chris Amon | Ensign-Ford | 1:31.75 |
| 13 | 8 | (Brazil) Carlos Pace | Brabham-Alfa Romeo | 1:31.81 |
| 14 | 11 | (United Kingdom) James Hunt | McLaren-Ford | 1:31.88 |
| 15 | 16 | (United Kingdom) Tom Pryce | Shadow-Ford | 1:31.98 |
| 16 | 6 | (Sweden) Gunnar Nilsson | Lotus-Ford | 1:32.10 |
| 17 | 28 | (United Kingdom) John Watson | Penske-Ford | 1:32.14 |
| 18 | 21 | (France) Michel Leclère | Wolf-Williams-Ford | 1:32.17 |
| 19 | 19 | (Australia) Alan Jones | Surtees-Ford | 1:32.33 |
| 20 | 7 | (Argentina) Carlos Reutemann | Brabham-Alfa Romeo | 1:32.43 |
| 21 | 20 | (Belgium) Jacky Ickx | Wolf-Williams-Ford | 1:32.74 |
| 22 | 38 | (France) Henri Pescarolo | Surtees-Ford | 1:32.82 |
| 23 | 37 | (Australia) Larry Perkins | Boro-Ford | 1:33.73 |
| 24 | 24 | (Austria) Harald Ertl | Hesketh-Ford | 1:33.93 |
| 25 | 35 | (Italy) Arturo Merzario | March-Ford | 1:35.17 |

*Drivers with a red background all failed to qualify as the grid was limited to 20 places.

== Race ==
Lauda won by 11 seconds over Jody Scheckter driving the six-wheeled Tyrrell P34, whilst Scheckter's teammate, Patrick Depailler, completed the podium in third. As a consequence of the race, Lauda extended his lead in the World Drivers' Championship to 36 points over his teammate Clay Regazzoni who had retired after starting second, going off track on oil laid down when James Hunt retired with a blown engine on lap 25, climbing back to third before crashing.

A lap down in fourth was the March 761 of Hans-Joachim Stuck with the McLaren M23 of Jochen Mass and the Fittipaldi FD04 of Emerson Fittipaldi completing the point scoring positions.

=== Race classification ===
| Pos | No | Driver | Constructor | Laps | Time/Retired | Grid | Points |
|---|---|---|---|---|---|---|---|
| 1 | 1 | (Austria) Niki Lauda | Ferrari | 78 | 1:59:51.47 | 1 | 9 |
| 2 | 3 | (South Africa) Jody Scheckter | Tyrrell-Ford | 78 | + 11.13 | 5 | 6 |
| 3 | 4 | (France) Patrick Depailler | Tyrrell-Ford | 78 | + 1:04.84 | 4 | 4 |
| 4 | 34 | (West Germany) Hans Joachim Stuck | March-Ford | 77 | + 1 Lap | 6 | 3 |
| 5 | 12 | (West Germany) Jochen Mass | McLaren-Ford | 77 | + 1 Lap | 11 | 2 |
| 6 | 30 | (Brazil) Emerson Fittipaldi | Fittipaldi-Ford | 77 | + 1 lap | 7 | 1 |
| 7 | 16 | (United Kingdom) Tom Pryce | Shadow-Ford | 77 | + 1 Lap | 15 | |
| 8 | 17 | (France) Jean-Pierre Jarier | Shadow-Ford | 76 | + 2 Laps | 10 | |
| 9 | 8 | (Brazil) Carlos Pace | Brabham-Alfa Romeo | 76 | + 2 Laps | 13 | |
| 10 | 28 | (United Kingdom) John Watson | Penske-Ford | 76 | + 2 Laps | 17 | |
| 11 | 21 | (France) Michel Leclère | Wolf-Williams-Ford | 76 | + 2 Laps | 18 | |
| 12 | 26 | (France) Jacques Laffite | Ligier-Matra | 75 | Accident | 8 | |
| 13 | 22 | (New Zealand) Chris Amon | Ensign-Ford | 74 | + 4 Laps | 12 | |
| 14 | 2 | (Switzerland) Clay Regazzoni | Ferrari | 73 | Accident | 2 | |
| Ret | 6 | (Sweden) Gunnar Nilsson | Lotus-Ford | 39 | Engine | 16 | |
| Ret | 10 | (Sweden) Ronnie Peterson | March-Ford | 26 | Accident | 3 | |
| Ret | 11 | (United Kingdom) James Hunt | McLaren-Ford | 24 | Engine | 14 | |
| Ret | 9 | (Italy) Vittorio Brambilla | March-Ford | 9 | Suspension | 9 | |
| Ret | 19 | (Australia) Alan Jones | Surtees-Ford | 1 | Collision | 19 | |
| Ret | 7 | (Argentina) Carlos Reutemann | Brabham-Alfa Romeo | 0 | Accident | 20 | |

== Championship standings after the race ==
Points are accurate at the conclusion of the race and do not reflect final results of the 1976 Spanish Grand Prix as it was under appeal.

Drivers' Championship standings

| Pos | Driver | Points |
|---|---|---|
| 1 | (Austria) Niki Lauda | 51 |
| 2 | (Switzerland) Clay Regazzoni | 15 |
| 3 | (France) Patrick Depailler | 14 |
| 4 | (South Africa) Jody Scheckter | 14 |
| 5 | (West Germany) Jochen Mass | 10 |

Constructors' Championship standings

| Pos | Constructor | Points |
|---|---|---|
| 1 | (Italy) Ferrari | 54 |
| 2 | (United Kingdom) Tyrrell-Ford | 22 |
| 3 | (United Kingdom) McLaren-Ford | 12 |
| 4 | (France) Ligier-Matra | 7 |
| 5 | (United Kingdom) Lotus-Ford | 6 |

- Note: Only the top five positions are included for both sets of standings.

| Previous race: 1976 Belgian Grand Prix | FIA Formula One World Championship; 1976 season | Next race: 1976 Swedish Grand Prix |
| Previous race: 1975 Monaco Grand Prix | Monaco Grand Prix | Next race: 1977 Monaco Grand Prix |
