= 1976 Swedish Grand Prix =

Race 7 of 16 in the 1976 Formula One season
← Previous race	Next race →
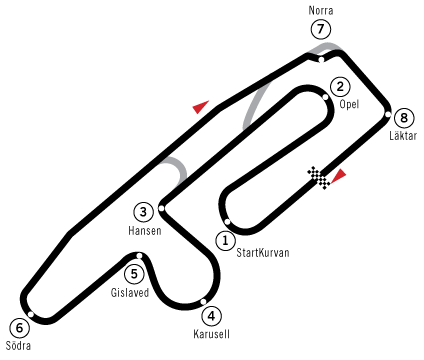

Race details
- Date: 13 June 1976
- Official name: VII Gislaved Sveriges Grand Prix
- Location: Scandinavian Raceway, Anderstorp
- Course length: 4.018 km (2.497 miles)
- Distance: 72 laps, 289.296 km (179.760 miles)
- Weather: Dry

Pole position
Driver	(South Africa) Jody Scheckter	Tyrrell-Ford
- Time: 1:25.659

Fastest lap
Driver	(United States) Mario Andretti	Lotus-Ford
- Time: 1:28.002 on lap 11

Podium
First	(South Africa) Jody Scheckter	Tyrrell-Ford
Second	(France) Patrick Depailler	Tyrrell-Ford
Third	(Austria) Niki Lauda	Ferrari

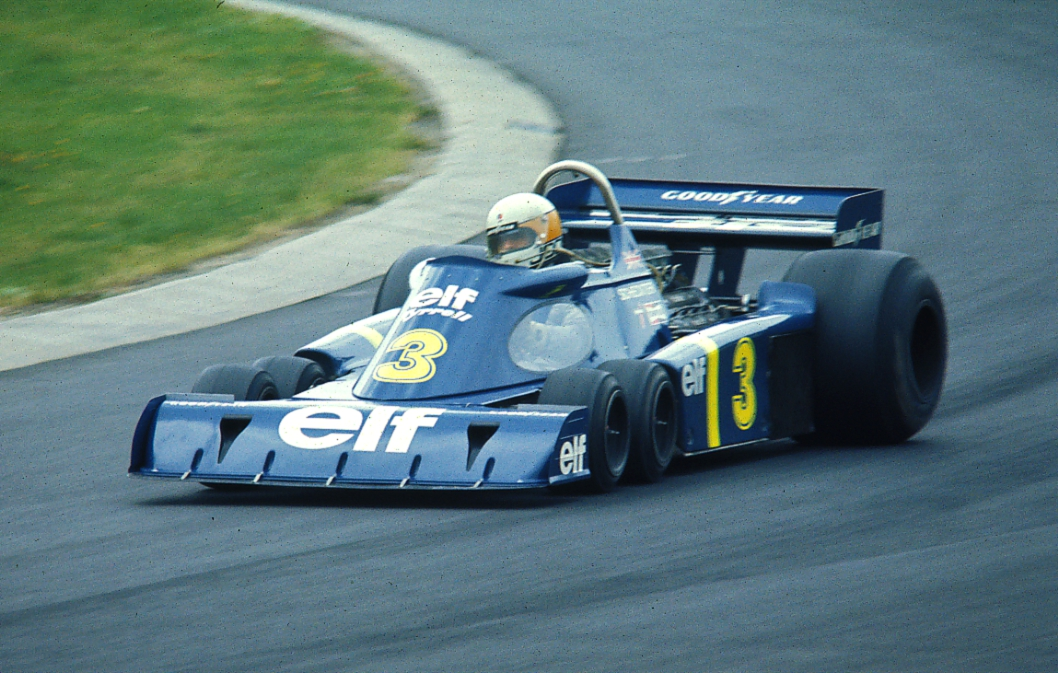
The Tyrrell P34 being driven by Jody Scheckter at the 1976 German Grand Prix at the Nurburgring. The '76 Swedish GP was its only win, and Scheckter won this race from the pole.

The 1976 Swedish Grand Prix was a Formula One motor race held at the Scandinavian Raceway in Anderstorp, Sweden on 13 June 1976. It was the seventh round of the 1976 Formula One season and the ninth Swedish Grand Prix. The race was contested over 72 laps of the 4.0 km circuit for a race distance of 290 kilometres.

It saw the first and only win of a six-wheel car – the Tyrrell P34. The theory was that its four front wheels would increase mechanical front-end grip – with more rubber on the road – and thus eliminate understeer while at the same time improve cornering and braking. When it was revealed it was the instant sensation of the 1976 season.

Tyrrell's Jody Scheckter took pole, with Patrick Depailler in fourth. In the race it was Mario Andretti in the Lotus 77 who led for much of the race. Andretti however had been penalised sixty seconds for jumping the start. Andretti's engine failed on lap 46 while attempting to build his lead over the two Tyrrells. They went on to finish first and second, Jody Scheckter leading Patrick Depailler to the line for his second Swedish Grand Prix victory.

Eight laps before Andretti's retirement Chris Amon crashed his Ensign N176 after a suspension failure, allowing championship leader Niki Lauda to move into the position that became third in his Ferrari 312T2. Jacques Laffite continued to show the promise of the Ligier JS5 in fourth. James Hunt was fifth in his McLaren M23 and Clay Regazzoni climbed into the final point in the second Ferrari late in the race.

== Classification ==
=== Qualifying ===
Pos.	Driver	Constructor	Time/Gap
1	(South Africa) Jody Scheckter	Tyrrell–Ford	1:25.659
2	(United States) Mario Andretti	Lotus–Ford	+0.349
3	(New Zealand) Chris Amon	Ensign–Ford	+0.504
4	(France) Patrick Depailler	Tyrrell–Ford	+0.703
5	(Austria) Niki Lauda	Ferrari	+0.782
6	(Sweden) Gunnar Nilsson	Lotus–Ford	+0.911
7	(France) Jacques Laffite	Ligier–Matra	+1.114
8	(United Kingdom) James Hunt	McLaren–Ford	+1.299
9	(Sweden) Ronnie Peterson	March–Ford	+1.381
10	(Brazil) Carlos Pace	Brabham–Alfa Romeo	+1.474
11	(Switzerland) Clay Regazzoni	Ferrari	+1.498
12	(United Kingdom) Tom Pryce	Shadow–Ford	+1.868
13	(West Germany) Jochen Mass	McLaren–Ford	+1.909
14	(France) Jean-Pierre Jarier	Shadow–Ford	+1.959
15	(Italy) Vittorio Brambilla	March–Ford	+1.981
16	(Argentina) Carlos Reutemann	Brabham–Alfa Romeo	+2.103
17	(United Kingdom) John Watson	Penske–Ford	+2.406
18	(Australia) Alan Jones	Surtees–Ford	+2.548
19	(Italy) Arturo Merzario	March–Ford	+2.562
20	(West Germany) Hans-Joachim Stuck	March–Ford	+2.571
21	(Brazil) Emerson Fittipaldi	Fittipaldi–Ford	+3.011
22	(Australia) Larry Perkins	Boro–Ford	+3.156
23	(Austria) Harald Ertl	Hesketh–Ford	+3.226
24	(United States) Brett Lunger	Surtees–Ford	+3.684
25	(France) Michel Leclère	Wolf-Williams–Ford	+3.938
26	(Switzerland) Loris Kessel	Brabham–Ford	+4.361
27	(Denmark) Jac Nellemann	Brabham–Ford	+4.600

*Drivers with a red background failed to qualify.

=== Race ===
Pos	No	Driver	Constructor	Laps	Time/Retired	Grid	Points
1	3	(South Africa) Jody Scheckter	Tyrrell-Ford	72	1:46:53.729	1	9
2	4	(France) Patrick Depailler	Tyrrell-Ford	72	+ 19.766	4	6
3	1	(Austria) Niki Lauda	Ferrari	72	+ 33.866	5	4
4	26	(France) Jacques Laffite	Ligier-Matra	72	+ 55.819	7	3
5	11	(United Kingdom) James Hunt	McLaren-Ford	72	+ 59.483	8	2
6	2	(Switzerland) Clay Regazzoni	Ferrari	72	+ 1:00.366	11	1
7	10	(Sweden) Ronnie Peterson	March-Ford	72	+ 1:03.493	9	
8	8	(Brazil) Carlos Pace	Brabham-Alfa Romeo	72	+ 1:11.613	10	
9	16	(United Kingdom) Tom Pryce	Shadow-Ford	71	+ 1 lap	12	
10	9	(Italy) Vittorio Brambilla	March-Ford	71	+ 1 Lap	15	
11	12	(West Germany) Jochen Mass	McLaren-Ford	71	+ 1 Lap	13	
12	17	(France) Jean-Pierre Jarier	Shadow-Ford	71	+ 1 Lap	14	
13	19	(Australia) Alan Jones	Surtees-Ford	71	+ 1 Lap	18	
14	35	(Italy) Arturo Merzario	March-Ford	70	Engine	19	
15	18	(United States) Brett Lunger	Surtees-Ford	70	+ 2 Laps	24	
Ret	24	(Austria) Harald Ertl	Hesketh-Ford	54	Spun Off	23	
Ret	34	(West Germany) Hans Joachim Stuck	March-Ford	52	Engine	20	
Ret	5	(United States) Mario Andretti	Lotus-Ford	45	Engine	2	
Ret	22	(New Zealand) Chris Amon	Ensign-Ford	38	Accident	3	
Ret	21	(France) Michel Leclère	Wolf-Williams-Ford	20	Engine	25	
Ret	37	(Australia) Larry Perkins	Boro-Ford	18	Engine	22	
Ret	30	(Brazil) Emerson Fittipaldi	Fittipaldi-Ford	10	Handling	21	
Ret	32	(Switzerland) Loris Kessel	Brabham-Ford	5	Accident	26	
Ret	6	(Sweden) Gunnar Nilsson	Lotus-Ford	2	Accident	6	
Ret	7	(Argentina) Carlos Reutemann	Brabham-Alfa Romeo	2	Engine	16	
Ret	28	(United Kingdom) John Watson	Penske-Ford	0	Accident	17	
DNQ	33	(Denmark) Jac Nellemann	Brabham-Ford				

== Notes ==
- This was the Formula One World Championship debut for Danish driver Jac Nellemann.
- This race marked the 200th Grand Prix in which an Italian driver participated. In those 200 races, Italian drivers won 25 Grands Prix, achieved 81 podium finishes, 22 pole positions, 24 fastest laps, 7 Grand Slams and won 3 World Championships.
- This was the 1st pole position set by a South African driver.
- This was the 2nd win of a Swedish Grand Prix for Jody Scheckter, breaking the previous record set by Denny Hulme at the 1973 Swedish Grand Prix. Equally, it was Tyrrell's second win of the Swedish Grand Prix, breaking the previous record set by McLaren at the same Grand Prix.
- This race marked the 200th Grand Prix start for Lotus. In those 200 races, Lotus won 57 Grands Prix, achieved 103 podium finishes, 67 pole positions, 51 fastest laps, 13 Grand Slams, and won 5 Driver's and 6 Constructor's World Championships.
- This was the 49th and 50th podium finish for Tyrrell.
- This was the 17th consecutive top-10 finish for Niki Lauda, a record streak that had begun since the 1975 Monaco Grand Prix and that broke the previous record of 14 consecutive top-10 finishes by Juan Manuel Fangio, set between the 1953 French Grand Prix and the 1955 Argentine Grand Prix.

== Championship standings after the race ==
Points are accurate at the conclusion of the race and do not reflect final results of the 1976 Spanish Grand Prix as it was under appeal.

Drivers' Championship standings

	Pos	Driver	Points
	1	(Austria) Niki Lauda	55
2	2	(South Africa) Jody Scheckter	23
	3	(France) Patrick Depailler	20
2	4	(Switzerland) Clay Regazzoni	16
1	5	(France) Jacques Laffite	10

Constructors' Championship standings

Pos	Constructor	Points
1	(Italy) Ferrari	58
2	(United Kingdom) Tyrrell-Ford	31
3	(United Kingdom) McLaren-Ford	14
4	(France) Ligier-Matra	10
5	(United Kingdom) Lotus-Ford	6

- Note: Only the top five positions are included for both sets of standings.

Previous race: 1976 Monaco Grand Prix	FIA Formula One World Championship; 1976 season	Next race: 1976 French Grand Prix
Previous race: 1975 Swedish Grand Prix	Swedish Grand Prix	Next race: 1977 Swedish Grand Prix
