= 1970 British Formula Three season =

Seasons
- ← 1969 1971 →

The 1970 British Formula Three Championship was the 20th season of the British Formula 3 season. The season consisted of three championships. The Lombank F3 Championship was won by Dave Walker. The Shellsport F3 Championship was won by Tony Trimmer and the Forward Trust Championship was won by future Formula One winner Carlos Pace.

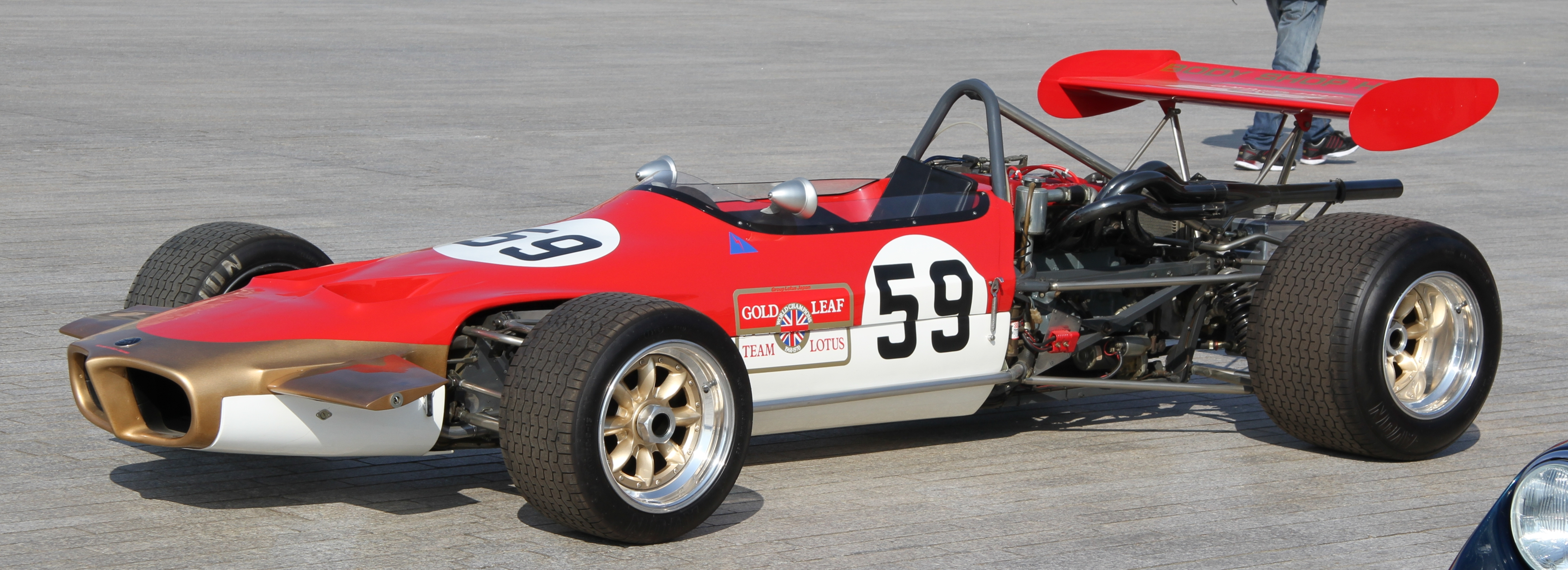
Dave Walker and Carlos Pace won their respective championships in the Lotus 59.

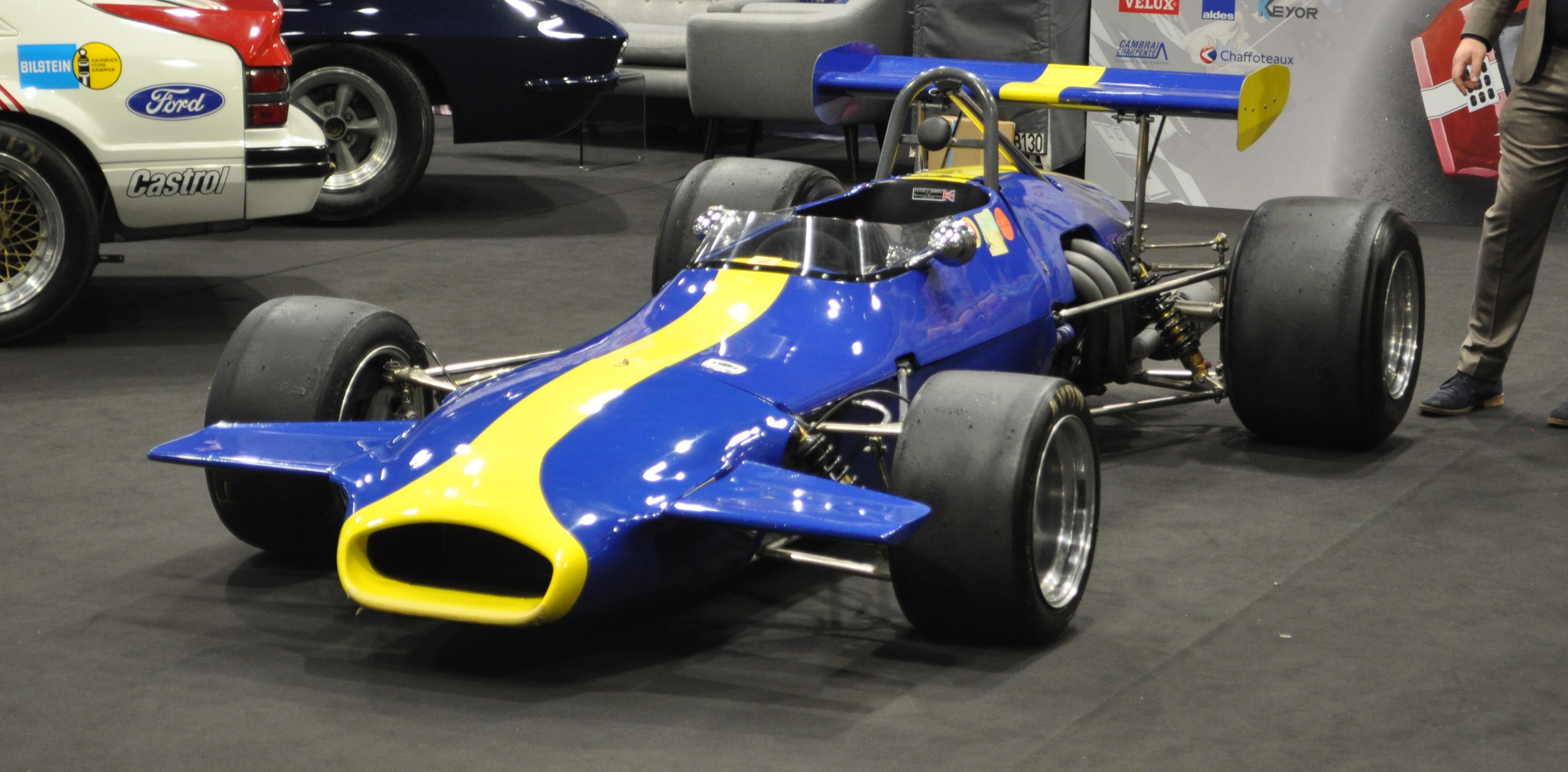
Tony Trimmer won the Shellsport Championship in the Brabham BT28.

The Lotus 59, its successor the Lotus 59A and the Brabham BT28 dominated the championships with majority of the wins and a significant amount of the top drivers and teams using them. The Chevron B17 and March 703 were also competitive cars.

The season is maybe best remembered for the 1970 F3 Daily Express Trophy race at Crystal Palace circuit (Round 11 of the Shell Super Oil British F3 Championship) where, whilst battling hard for second position, James Hunt and Dave Morgan crashed out of the race with 1 lap to go. Hunt then went over and pushed Morgan to the ground. This continued Hunts' reputation for crashing and earned Morgan a 12 month suspension.

== M.C.D. Lombank British F3 Championship ==
=== Race Calendar and Results ===
Round	Circuit	Date	Pole position	Winning driver	Winning team	Notes
1	(United Kingdom) Snetterton	15 March	(United Kingdom) Tony Trimmer	(United Kingdom) Tony Trimmer	Race Cars International	
2	(United Kingdom) Mallory Park	30 March	(United Kingdom) Barrie Maskell	(Australia) Dave Walker	Team Lotus	
3	(United Kingdom) Brands Hatch	3 May	(Brazil) Carlos Pace	(Australia) Bert Hawthorne	Bert Hawthorne	
4	(United Kingdom) Castle Combe	9 May	(Brazil) Carlos Pace	(United Kingdom) David Cole	Gomm Metal Development	
5	(United Kingdom) Thruxton	7 June	(Australia) Dave Walker	(Brazil) Carlos Pace	Jim Russell Racing Driver School	
6	(United Kingdom) Oulton Park	4 July	(Australia) Dave Walker	(Australia) Dave Walker	Team Lotus	
7	(United Kingdom) Mallory Park	26 July	(Australia) Dave Walker	(United Kingdom) Bev Bond	Team Lotus	
8	(United Kingdom) Brands Hatch	16 August	(United Kingdom) Tony Trimmer	(United Kingdom) Tony Trimmer	Race Cars International	
9	(United Kingdom) Cadwell Park	13 September	(United Kingdom) James Hunt	(Sweden) Ulf Svensson	Ulf Svensson	Round shared with Lombank British F3 Championship Rd 13
10	(United Kingdom) Oulton Park	19 September	(United Kingdom) Bev Bond	(United Kingdom) Barrie Maskell	Northern England Racing Organisation	
11	(United Kingdom) Mallory Park	27 September	(Australia) Dave Walker	(Australia) Dave Walker	Team Lotus	
12	(United Kingdom) Snetterton	11 October	(Brazil) Wilson Fittipaldi	(United Kingdom) Tony Trimmer	Race Cars International	
13	(United Kingdom) Brands Hatch	18 October	(United Kingdom) Tony Trimmer	(United Kingdom) Tony Trimmer	Race Cars International	Round shared with Shell Super Oil British F3 Championship Rd 12
14	(United Kingdom) Brands Hatch	27 December	Race cancelled			Excessive snow on track

=== Championship Standings ===
Place	Driver	Entrant	Total
1	(Australia) Dave Walker	Team Lotus	48
2	(Brazil) Carlos Pace	Jim Russell Racing Driver School	43
2	(United Kingdom) Tony Trimmer	Race Cars International	43
4	(United Kingdom) Bev Bond	Team Lotus	35
5	(United States) Steve Matchett	The Tulip Stable	15

== B.R.S.C.C. MotorSport - Shell Super Oil British F3 Championship ==
=== Race Calendar and Results ===
Round	Circuit	Date	Pole position	Winning driver	Winning team	Notes
1	(United Kingdom) Snetterton	27 March	(Australia) Dave Walker	(United Kingdom) Tony Trimmer	Race Cars International	
2	(United Kingdom) Silverstone	26 April	N/A	(Australia) Dave Walker	Team Lotus	
3						
4	(United Kingdom) Oulton Park	25 May	(United Kingdom) James Hunt	(United Kingdom) Bev Bond	Team Lotus	
5	(United Kingdom) Silverstone	6 June	(United Kingdom) Mike Beuttler	(United Kingdom) Mike Beuttler	Clarke Mordaunt Racing	
6	(United Kingdom) Croft	11 July	(Australia) Dave Walker	(Brazil) Carlos Pace	Jim Russell Racing Driver School	Round shared with Forward Trust British F3 Championship Rd 5
7	(United Kingdom) Brands Hatch	17 July	(United Kingdom) James Hunt	(United Kingdom) Mike Beuttler	Clarke Mordaunt Racing	
8	(United Kingdom) Thruxton	9 August	(United Kingdom) Richard Scott	(United Kingdom) Bev Bond	Team Lotus	Round shared with Forward Trust British F3 Championship Rd 7
9	(United Kingdom) Brands Hatch	31 August	(United Kingdom) Tony Trimmer	(United Kingdom) Gerry Birrell	Sports Motors (Manchester)	
10	(United Kingdom) Cadwell Park	13 September	(United Kingdom) James Hunt	(Sweden) Ulf Svensson	Ulf Svensson	Round shared with Lombank British F3 Championship Rd 9
11	(United Kingdom) Crystal Palace	3 October	(United Kingdom) Gerry Birrell	(Australia) Dave Walker	Team Lotus	
12	(United Kingdom) Brands Hatch	18 October	(United Kingdom) Tony Trimmer	(United Kingdom) Tony Trimmer	Race Cars International	Round shared with Lombank British F3 Championship Rd 13

=== Championship Standings ===
Place	Driver	Entrant	Total
1	(United Kingdom) Tony Trimmer	Race Cars International	44
2	(Australia) Dave Walker	Team Lotus	41
3	(United Kingdom) Mike Beuttler	Clarke Mordaunt Racing	32
4	(United Kingdom) Bev Bond	Team Lotus	30
5	(Brazil) Carlos Pace	Jim Russell Racing Driver School	24
5	(United Kingdom) James Hunt	Molyslip Lotus Racing	24

== B.A.R.C. Forward Trust British F3 Championship ==
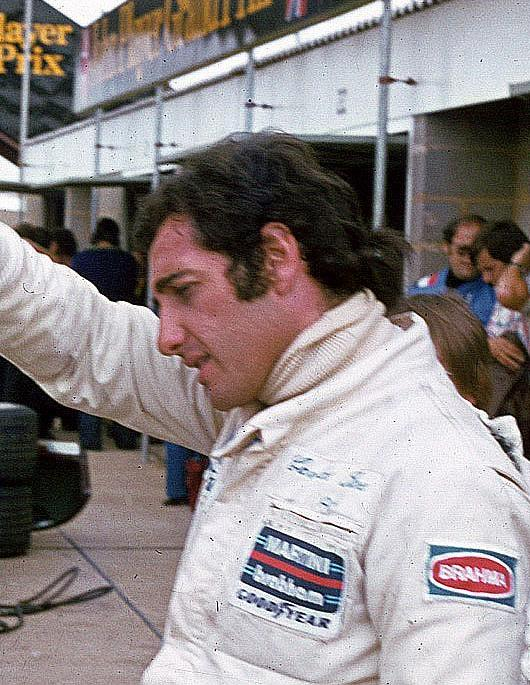
Forward Trust champion, Carlos Pace

=== Race Calendar and Results ===
Round	Circuit	Date	Pole position	Winning driver	Winning team	Notes
1	(United Kingdom) Thruxton	8 March	(United Kingdom) Richard Scott	(United Kingdom) Mike Beuttler	Clarke Mordaunt Racing	
2	(United Kingdom) Silverstone	5 April	(United Kingdom) Bev Bond	(Australia) Dave Walker	Team Lotus	
3	(United Kingdom) Thruxton	24 May	(Australia) Dave Walker	(United Kingdom) Richard Scott	Paul Watson Racing Organisation	
4	(United Kingdom) Silverstone	31 May	(Brazil) Carlos Pace	(Brazil) Wilson Fittipaldi	Jim Russell Racing Driver School	
5	(United Kingdom) Croft	11 July	(Australia) Dave Walker	(Brazil) Carlos Pace	Jim Russell Racing Driver School	Round shared with Shell Super Oil British F3 Championship Rd 6
6	(United Kingdom) Cadwell Park	19 July	(United Kingdom) James Hunt	(Australia) Dave Walker	Team Lotus	
7	(United Kingdom) Thruxton	9 August	(Australia) Richard Scott	(United Kingdom) Bev Bond	Team Lotus	Round shared with Shell Super Oil British F3 Championship Rd 8
8	(United Kingdom) Silverstone	5 September	(United States) Steve Matchett	(United Kingdom) Cyd Williams	Nathalie Goodwin Racing	
9	(United Kingdom) Crystal Palace	12 September	(United Kingdom) Gerry Birrell	(Brazil) Carlos Pace	Jim Russell Racing Driver School	
10	(United Kingdom) Thruxton	20 September	(United Kingdom) Gerry Birrell	(Australia) Dave Walker	Team Lotus	
11	(United Kingdom) Thruxton	14 November	(United Kingdom) Dave Morgan	(United Kingdom) Chris Skeaping	Chris Skeaping	

=== Championship Standings ===
Place	Driver	Entrant	Total
1	(Brazil) Carlos Pace	Jim Russell Racing Driver School	41
2	(Australia) Dave Walker	Team Lotus	37
3	(United Kingdom) Bev Bond	Team Lotus	27
4	(Brazil) Wilson Fittipaldi	Jim Russell Racing Driver School	22
5	(United Kingdom) Cyd Williams	Nathalie Goodwin Racing	19
