= Brabham BT44 =

Formula One racing car

Brabham BT44 Brabham BT44B
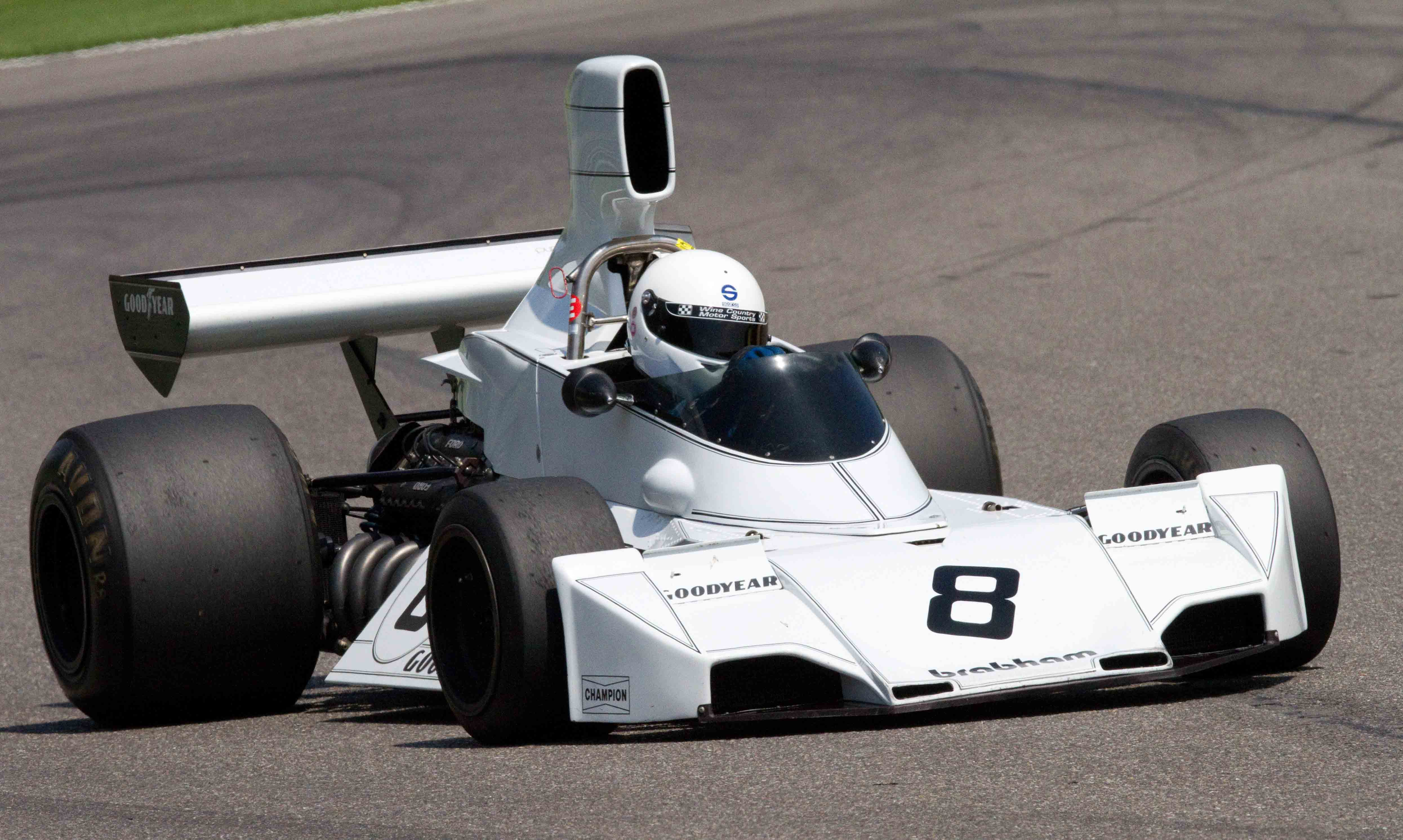
- Brabham BT44 (1974)
- Category: Formula One
- Constructor: Brabham
- Designer: Gordon Murray
- Predecessor: BT42
- Successor: BT45

Technical specifications
- Chassis: Aluminum monocoque
- Suspension (front): Rising rate pullrod actuated
- Suspension (rear): Multi-link
- Engine: Cosworth DFV 2993 cc 90 Degree V-8 Naturally aspirated Mid-engined
- Transmission: Hewland FG400 5 forward, 1 reverse
- Fuel: FINA
- Tyres: Goodyear

Competition history
- Notable entrants: Motor Racing Developments; Martini Racing (1975)
- Notable drivers: 7. (Argentina) Carlos Reutemann; 8. (United Kingdom) Richard Robarts; 8. (Liechtenstein) Rikky von Opel; 8. (Brazil) Carlos Pace
- Debut: 1974 Argentine Grand Prix
Races	Wins	Poles	F/Laps
36	5	2	4
- Constructors' Championships: 0
- Drivers' Championships: 0

The Brabham BT44 was a Formula One racing car designed by Gordon Murray, Brabham's chief designer and was used in the 1974, 1975 and in 1976 season by RAM Racing.

== Design ==
An update of the partially successful BT42 of 1973, the BT44 was a simple design with a standard Ford DFV/Hewland gearbox combination, but was very clean aerodynamically. Murray had an eye for clean lines, and the BT44 was particularly graceful. He was also a forward thinker, and tinkered with side skirts and airdams on the car, a precursor to ground effects aerodynamics.

Sponsorship came from Martini.

== Racing history ==
=== 1974 ===
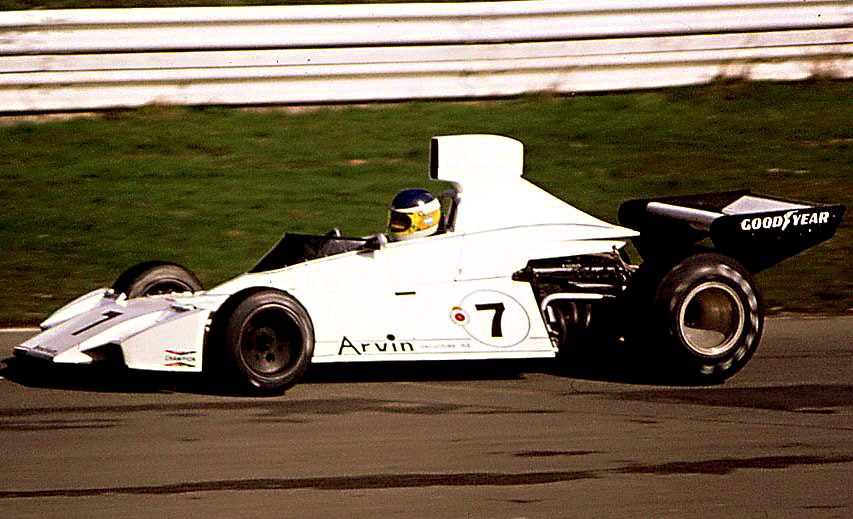
Carlos Reutemann in the all-white Brabham BT44 at the 1974 Race of Champions.

The 1974 season was successful for Brabham. Carlos Reutemann took three wins with the car, partnered by Carlos Pace who was able to string a series of promising results together. Brabham finished at a fighting fifth place in the Constructor's Championship after a closely fought season.

=== 1975 ===
The BT44 was modified for 1975, and Pace won his first and only Grand Prix at his home event in Brazil, while Reutemann won at the Nürburgring. A series of other strong finishes helped Reutemann to finish third in the drivers' championship in 1975, whilst Brabham equalled his feat in the constructors' championship by finishing second. Whilst the BT44 was a good car, it couldn't match the McLaren M23 or the Ferrari 312T.

=== 1976 ===
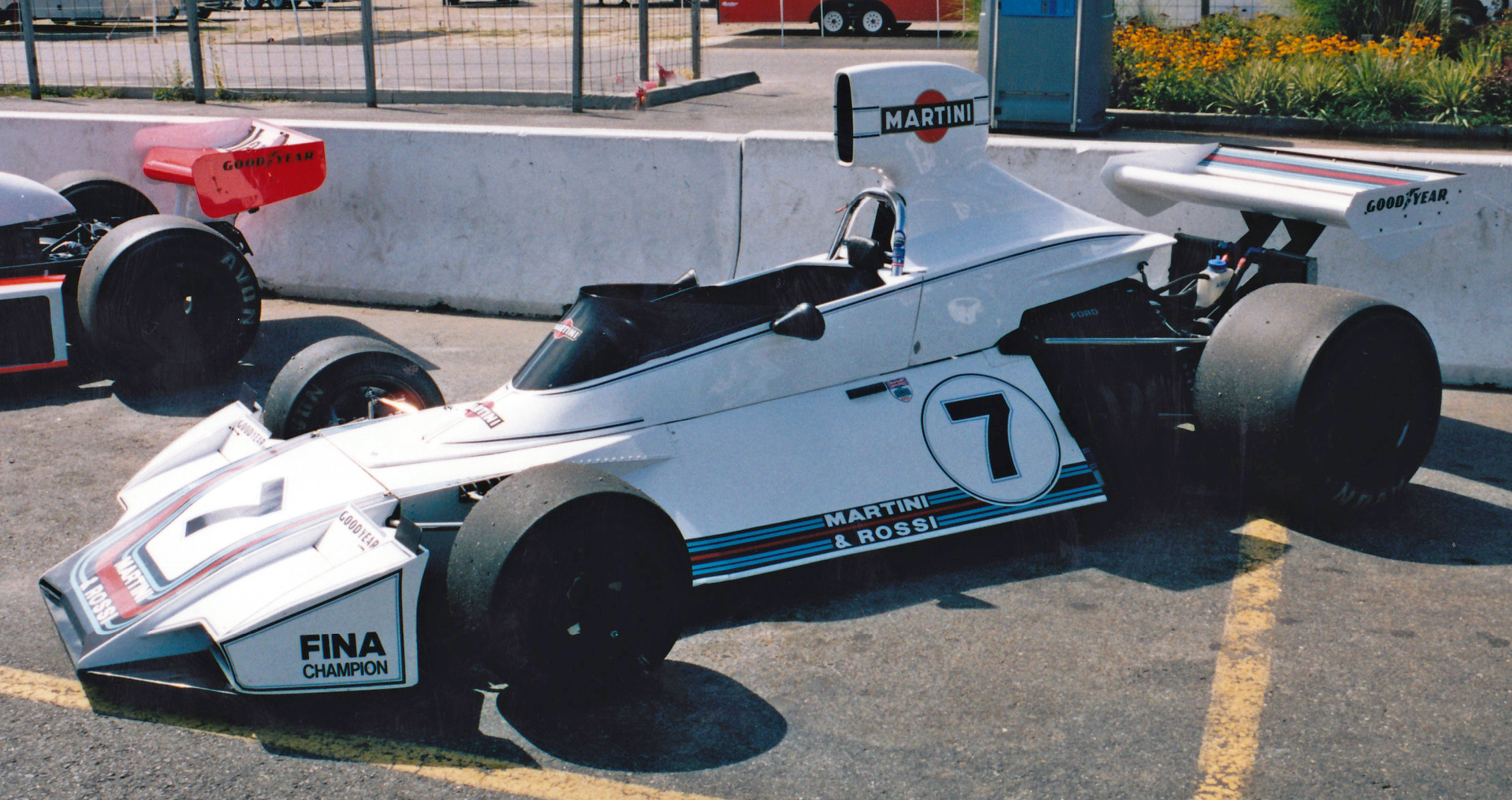
1975 Brabham BT44B

The BT44 was replaced by the Alfa Romeo powered BT45 for 1976 which proved to be a serious step back for the team. The BT44Bs were sold to RAM Racing, who ran them for a variety of drivers in the 1976 World Championship, including Loris Kessel, Emilio de Villota, Patrick Nève, Jac Nellemann, Damien Magee, Lella Lombardi and Bob Evans, none of whom had much success.

== Formula One World Championship results ==
(key) (results in bold indicate pole position, results in italics indicate fastest lap)

Year	Entrant	Chassis	Engine	Tyres	Drivers	1	2	3	4	5	6	7	8	9	10	11	12	13	14	15	16	Pts	WCC
1974	Motor Racing Developments	BT44	Ford Cosworth DFV 3.0 V8	G		ARG	BRA	RSA	ESP	BEL	MON	SWE	NED	FRA	GBR	GER	AUT	ITA	CAN	USA		**35**^{1}	**5th**
1974	Motor Racing Developments	BT44	Ford Cosworth DFV 3.0 V8	G	Carlos Reutemann	7	7	1	Ret	Ret	Ret	Ret	12	Ret	6	3	1	Ret	9	**1**		**35**^{1}	**5th**
1974	Motor Racing Developments	BT44	Ford Cosworth DFV 3.0 V8	G	Richard Robarts	Ret	15	17														**35**^{1}	**5th**
1974	Motor Racing Developments	BT44	Ford Cosworth DFV 3.0 V8	G	Rikky von Opel				Ret	Ret	DNQ	9	9	DNQ								**35**^{1}	**5th**
1974	Motor Racing Developments	BT44	Ford Cosworth DFV 3.0 V8	G	Carlos Pace										9	12	Ret	5	8	2		**35**^{1}	**5th**
1974	Goldie Hexagon Racing	BT44	Ford Cosworth DFV 3.0 V8	F	John Watson											Ret	4	7	Ret	5		**35**^{1}	**5th**
1975	Martini Racing	BT44B	Ford Cosworth DFV 3.0 V8	G		ARG	BRA	RSA	ESP	MON	BEL	SWE	NED	FRA	GBR	GER	AUT	ITA	USA			**54**	**2nd**
1975	Martini Racing	BT44B	Ford Cosworth DFV 3.0 V8	G	Carlos Reutemann	3	8	2	3	9	3	2	4	14	Ret	1	14	4	Ret			**54**	**2nd**
1975	Martini Racing	BT44B	Ford Cosworth DFV 3.0 V8	G	Carlos Pace	Ret	1	**4**	Ret	3	8	Ret	5	Ret	2	Ret	Ret	Ret	Ret			**54**	**2nd**
1976	RAM Racing	BT44B	Ford Cosworth DFV 3.0 V8	G		BRA	RSA	USW	ESP	BEL	MON	SWE	FRA	GBR	GER	AUT	NED	ITA	CAN	USA	JPN	**0**	-
1976	RAM Racing	BT44B	Ford Cosworth DFV 3.0 V8	G	Loris Kessel				DNQ	12		Ret	DNQ			NC						**0**	-
1976	RAM Racing	BT44B	Ford Cosworth DFV 3.0 V8	G	Emilio de Villota				DNQ													**0**	-
1976	RAM Racing	BT44B	Ford Cosworth DFV 3.0 V8	G	Patrick Nève					Ret												**0**	-
1976	RAM Racing	BT44B	Ford Cosworth DFV 3.0 V8	G	Jac Nellemann							DNQ										**0**	-
1976	RAM Racing	BT44B	Ford Cosworth DFV 3.0 V8	G	Damien Magee								DNQ									**0**	-
1976	RAM Racing	BT44B	Ford Cosworth DFV 3.0 V8	G	Bob Evans									Ret								**0**	-
1976	RAM Racing	BT44B	Ford Cosworth DFV 3.0 V8	G	Lella Lombardi									DNQ	DNQ	12						**0**	-
1976	RAM Racing	BT44B	Ford Cosworth DFV 3.0 V8	G	Rolf Stommelen										DNS							**0**	-

^1 Includes 1 point scored using a Brabham BT42.

== See also ==
- Tyrrell P34
- Lotus 72
