= 1976 German Grand Prix =

Race 10 of 16 in the 1976 Formula One season
← Previous race	Next race →

Race details
- Date: 1 August 1976
- Official name: XXXVIII Großer Preis von Deutschland
- Location: Nürburgring, Nürburg, West Germany
- Course: Permanent racing facility
- Course length: 22.835 km (14.19 miles)
- Distance: 14 laps, 319.690 km (198.65 miles)
- Weather: Rain at start, later drying

Pole position
Driver	(United Kingdom) James Hunt	McLaren-Ford
- Time: 7:06.5

Fastest lap
Driver	(South Africa) Jody Scheckter	Tyrrell-Ford
- Time: 7:10.8 on lap 13

Podium
First	(United Kingdom) James Hunt	McLaren-Ford
Second	(South Africa) Jody Scheckter	Tyrrell-Ford
Third	(West Germany) Jochen Mass	McLaren-Ford

The 1976 German Grand Prix (formally the XXXVIII Großer Preis von Deutschland) was a Formula One motor race held at the Nürburgring on 1 August 1976. It was the scene of reigning world champion Niki Lauda's near-fatal accident, and the last Formula One race to be held on the 22.835-kilometre (14.189 mi) Nordschleife section of the track. The 14-lap race was the tenth round of the 1976 Formula One season and was won by James Hunt.

== Race report ==
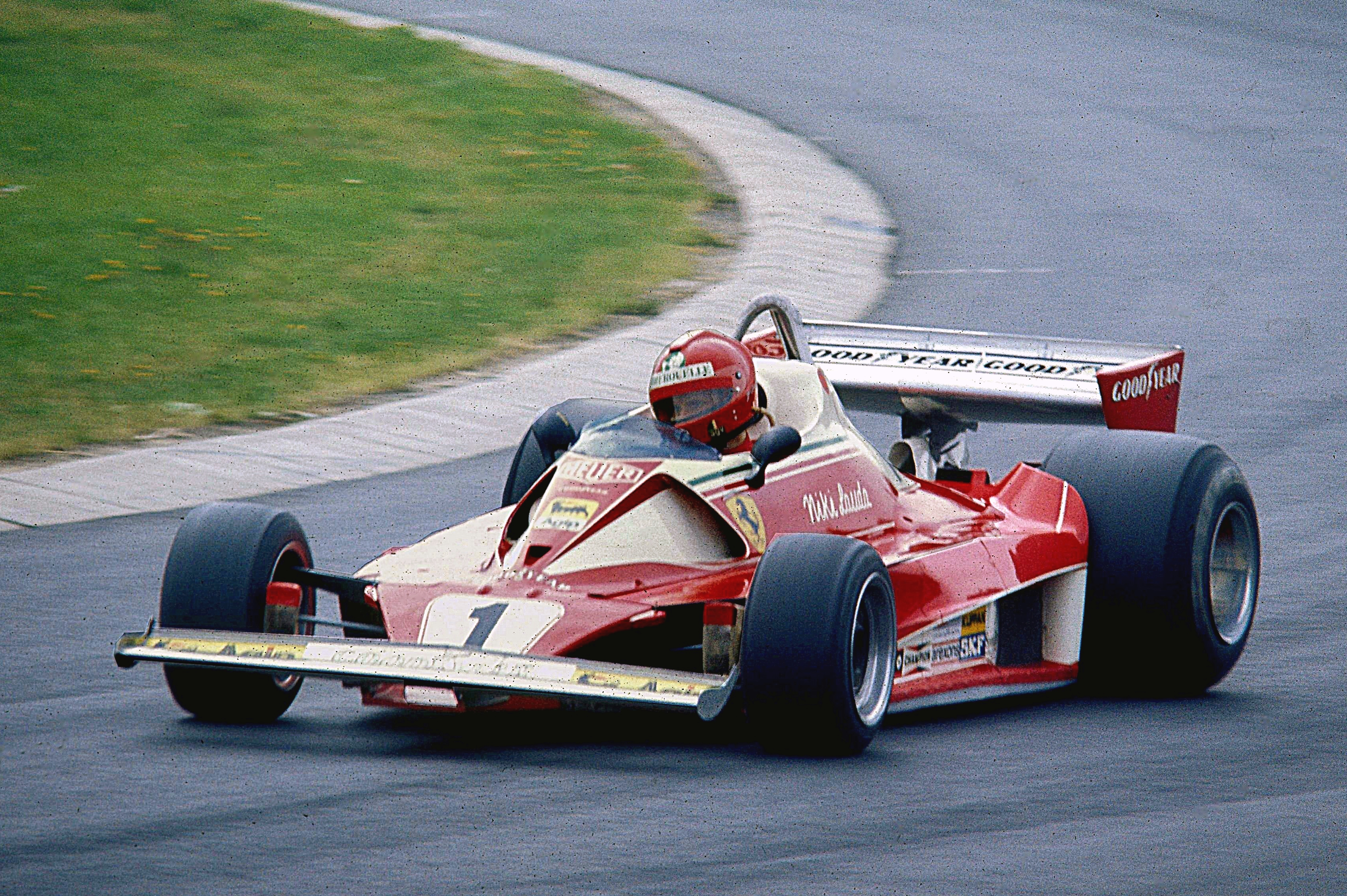
Niki Lauda in the Ferrari 312T2 during practice

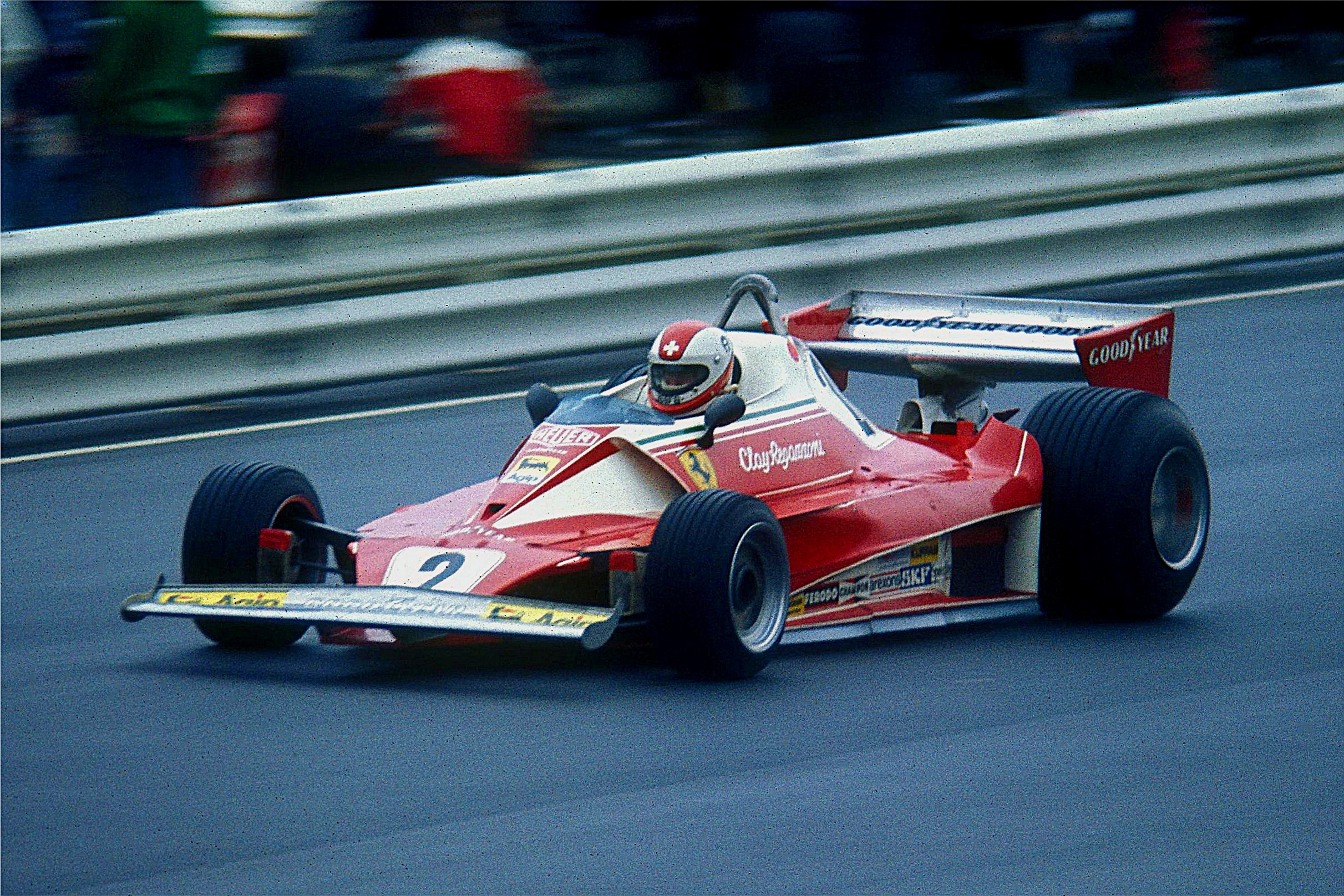
Clay Regazzoni in the Ferrari 312T2 during practice

The old Nürburgring was considered to be the most challenging and demanding purpose-built circuit in the world. Measuring at 14.2 miles, it was by far the longest circuit on the calendar and because it was built in the Eifel mountains it had over 1,000 feet (300 m) of elevation change. Although it had been slightly remodeled in 1971, it still retained much of the character that led three-time world champion Jackie Stewart to nickname it "The Green Hell". The circuit's extraordinary size meant that it needed at least five times the number of marshals and medical support as almost any other Grand Prix to properly maintain it, something the German organizers were unable to provide. Additionally, by its very nature it was impossible to upgrade it to the increased safety standards of the 1970s. It was narrow, had very few run-off areas, and numerous sections were nearly inaccessible to fire marshals. It was also very bumpy—indeed, at a number of points, including the Flugplatz and Pflanzgarten, the cars could actually become airborne. The sheer size of the circuit also meant that weather and track conditions around it could vary wildly with some sections dry and others wet, making a safe choice of tyres difficult or impossible. Two weeks previously, a fatal crash at Flugplatz had occurred during practice for a Formula Super-Vee race which, according to Autosport, was the 131st fatality at the Nürburgring over its 49-year history. It was also unsuitable for television; its sheer size made it all but impossible to adequately cover a race there. For these reasons, it had been decided even before the 1976 race that after nearly half a century, it would be the last German Grand Prix held on the old Nürburgring and the last on the Nordschleife section.

Defending world champion Niki Lauda, who was also the current season's points leader, was not impressed with safety conditions and the organizers' inability to provide enough safety support staff (doctors, helicopters, fire marshals) for the leviathan German circuit, especially since the forecast called for rain. He attempted to arrange a boycott of the race, but the other drivers voted against it by just one vote, and the race went ahead.

The race weekend began with some changes to the drivers' lineup: Jacky Ickx was fired from the Walter Wolf Racing team and was replaced by Arturo Merzario, and a new team was present, Scuderia Rondini, which bought an old Tyrrell 007 for Alessandro Pesenti-Rossi. RAM was going to run Rolf Stommelen in one of its ex-works Brabham BT44s, but in the middle of the practice session the local police impounded the cars (because of a legal action by former driver Loris Kessel) and, as a result, Stommelen transferred to the works Brabham team to drive a spare Alfa-Romeo-powered BT45. Lella Lombardi was also affected by the impound action as part of the RAM squad, but could not find a replacement drive.

In 1975, Lauda had been the first and only driver to break the seven-minute mark. Fans were looking forward to whether he or others could repeat this after the technical rules had been changed, with the disappearance of the high air boxes being the most visible difference (which, theoretically, would make cars lighter and faster).

Due to wet conditions on Saturday, the grid was already determined in Friday qualifying, with 7:06-plus lap times similar to those of 1972. James Hunt took the pole with Niki Lauda second, while Patrick Depailler lined up third in the six-wheeled Tyrrell P34. Hans-Joachim Stuck was fourth in his March ahead of Clay Regazzoni, Jacques Laffite, Carlos Pace, Jody Scheckter, Jochen Mass, and Carlos Reutemann.

=== Race ===
The 14-lap race was due to start at 1:30pm. but a 15-minute delay was announced as there were numerous Renault 5 saloons to sweep up after they had had a race. The race was delayed till 2:05pm as the weather turned to wet on the far side of the circuit. Most drivers started the race on wet tyres, except Jochen Mass, who, having much experience at the Nürburgring and expecting a change for better weather, decided to use dry weather tyres. At the start, Regazzoni took the lead while both Hunt and Lauda fell back. Hunt took second, third was a fast-starting Mass, fourth was Laffite who took advantage from the fact that Stuck's car had been pushed off the grid with a clutch problem (although the German started at the back of the field). In the course of the first lap, Regazzoni spun and dropped to fourth. At the end of the lap, the weather changed back to dry and most drivers pitted for dry tyres, leaving Mass with the second place behind Peterson, who decided to go on wet tyres for another lap. At the end of lap two, Mass was in front, with Gunnar Nilsson (who had not stopped) in second place and Hunt third.

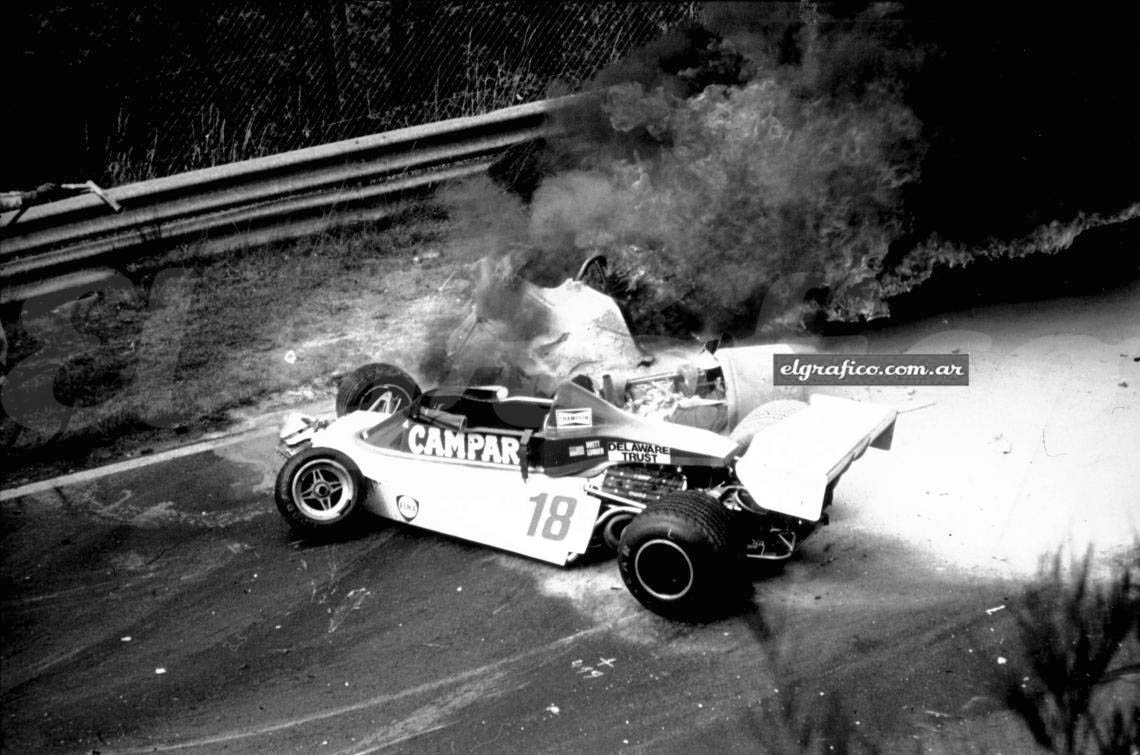
Niki Lauda's Ferrari 312T2, having been hit by Brett Lunger's Surtees TS19

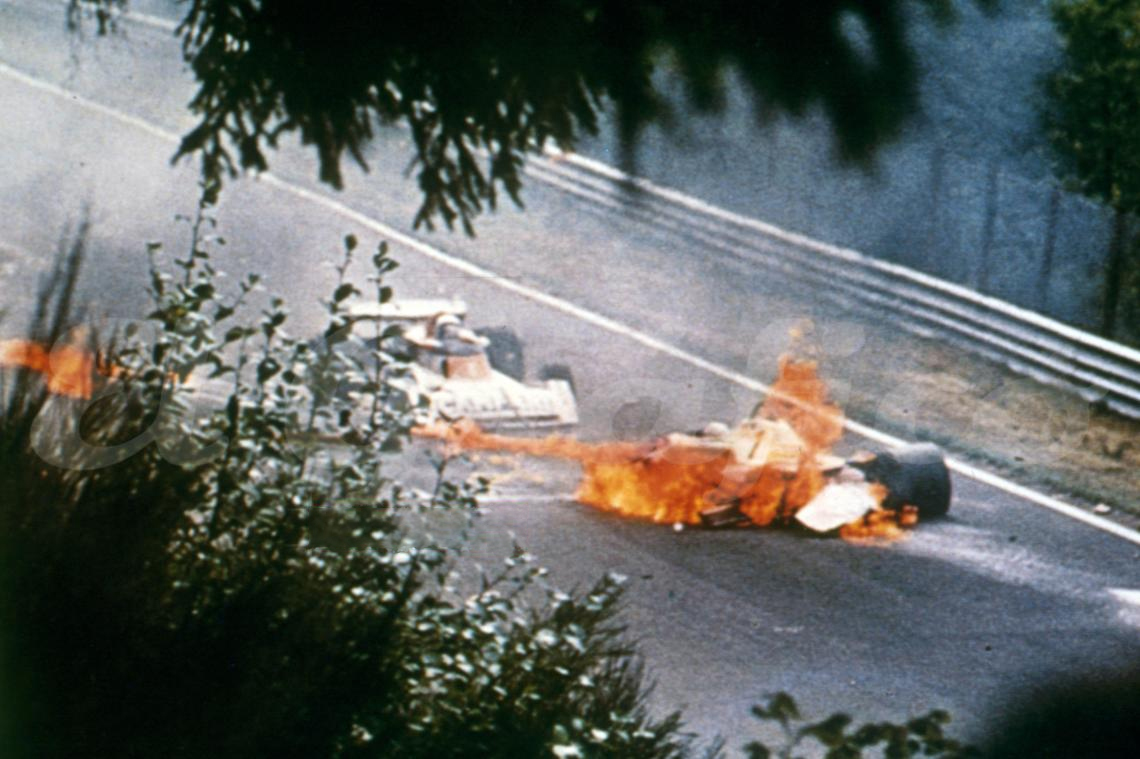
Niki Lauda's Ferrari 312T2 on fire with Lauda in the car

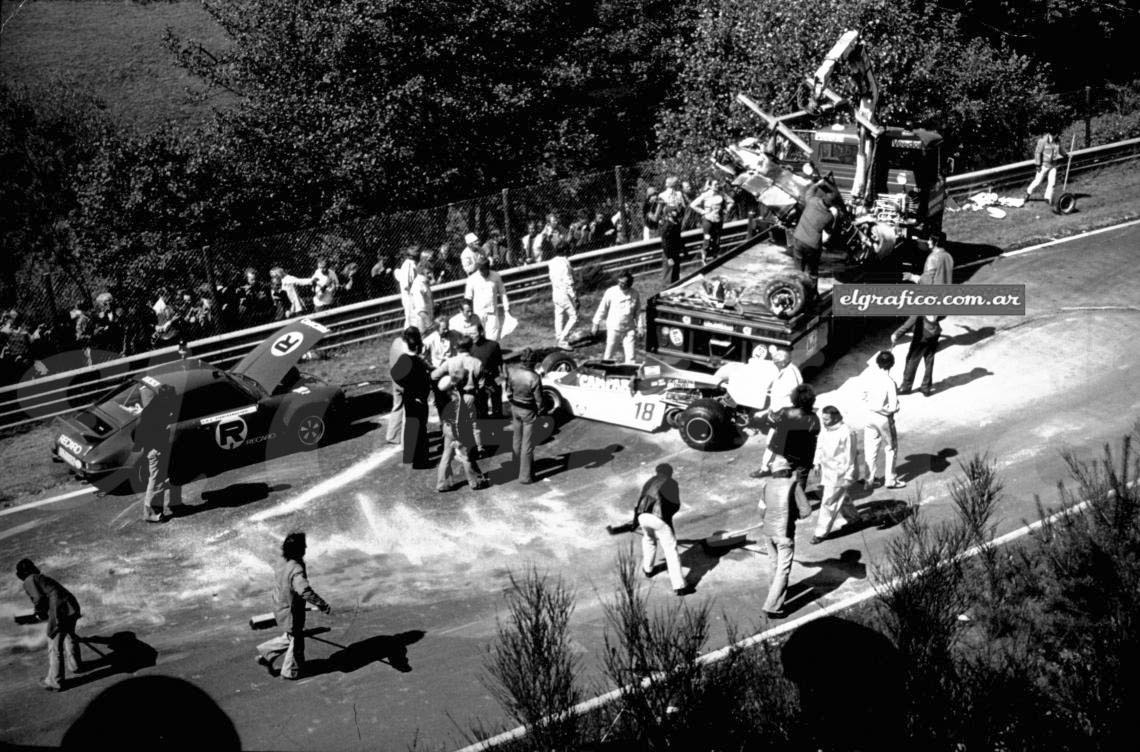
Niki Lauda's Ferrari 312T2 taken away on a tow truck and Brett Lunger's Surtees TS19 also damaged

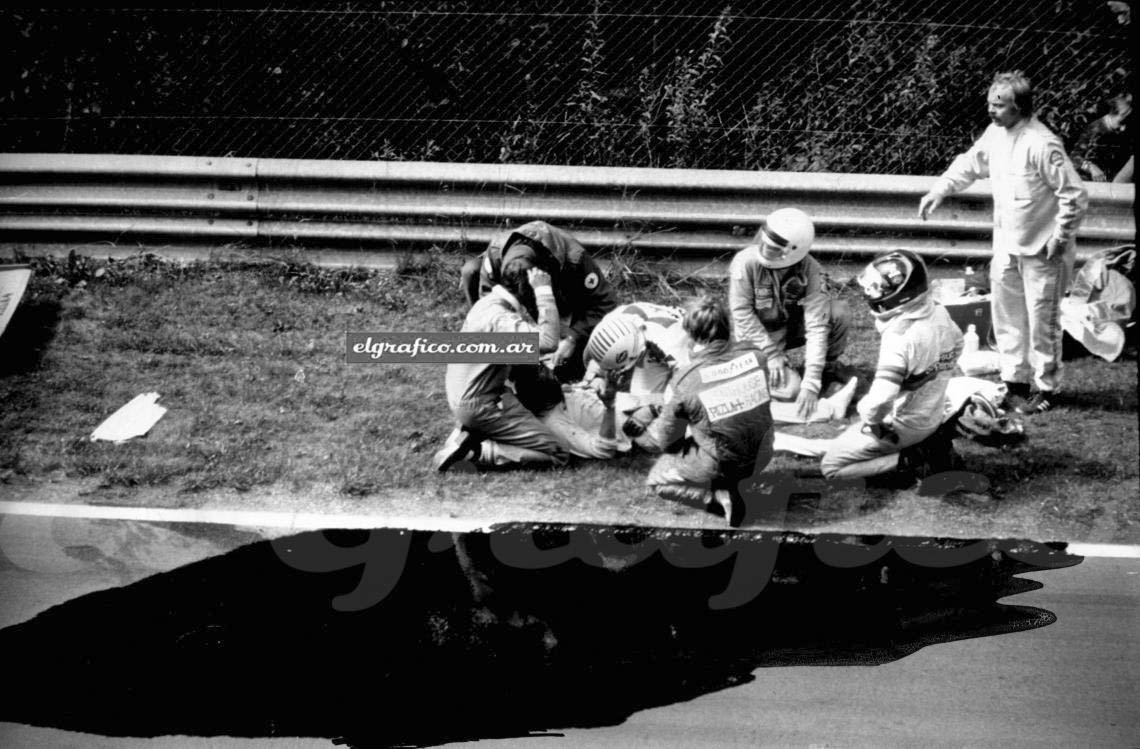
Niki Lauda communicating with John Watson and Emerson Fittipaldi after his crash

Lauda had also changed his tyres after lap one and was trying hard to make up for the lost time. Just after the fast left kink before the Bergwerk right hand curve, his Ferrari 312T2 snapped to the right and spun through the fencing into an earth bank. The car bounced back onto the track, enveloped in flames. Guy Edwards managed to avoid the Ferrari, but Brett Lunger hit it and Harald Ertl then hit Lunger's car. All three drivers stopped and tried to get Lauda out of the flames and they were joined by Merzario, who stopped his Wolf Williams after seeing the wreck. Lauda had suffered serious burns and was rushed by helicopter to the Bundeswehr hospital in Koblenz; from there he was flown to the Trauma Clinic in Ludwigshafen, home to Germany's most advanced burn ward at the time, where he fought for his life for the next few days.

Most cars had assembled at the crash site, being unable to pass by on the narrow track. The race had been stopped after the accident, and the race was restarted at 3:10pm, the restart only saw 20 of the 24 starters remaining, although Chris Amon decided not to start the race again. The rain had gone and Hunt passed Regazzoni, Scheckter, Depailler, and Pace to take the lead for good. At the Flugplatz, Peterson lost control of his March and crashed heavily, while Regazzoni had another spin and Depailler went off, avoiding the Ferrari. Pace overtook Scheckter and ended the first lap in second place. On the second lap, Scheckter passed Pace and the Brazilian fell behind Regazzoni on the third lap, during which sixth-placed Vittorio Brambilla crashed at Adenau Bridge because of a brake failure on his March. Mass took advantage of it and overtook Gunnar Nilsson on the fifth lap and Pace on lap 10. On the 12th lap, Regazzoni spun again and Mass moved to third with Pace fourth, Nilsson fifth, and Stommelen sixth.

Lauda's accident proved why the old Nürburgring had become too dangerous and too difficult to manage satisfactorily for Formula One. The organizers just did not have the resources to manage such a long circuit, even though the "ONS-Staffel" was equipped with a Porsche 911 rescue car. The biggest concern the drivers had, was that the one helicopter at the circuit was parked in the pits, which was on one extreme end of the circuit, and it took 5 to 6 minutes for it to get to Lauda's accident site, as opposed to regulations established some years later where there must be a helicopter and efficient services within a minute of any on-track incident. Had it not been for the efforts of his fellow drivers, Lauda would have likely died before rescue crews arrived. After the new Nürburgring was rebuilt with the Nordschleife being bypassed, Formula One would return to the new 2.8 miles (4.5 km) circuit for multiple European Grands Prix beginning in 1984, the German Grand Prix from 1985 and in 2020, the inaugural Eifel Grand Prix.

Chris Amon decided to end his career immediately after Lauda's accident, but returned for the 1976 Canadian Grand Prix, driving a Williams-Ford for Walter Wolf Racing.

== Classification ==
=== Qualifying ===
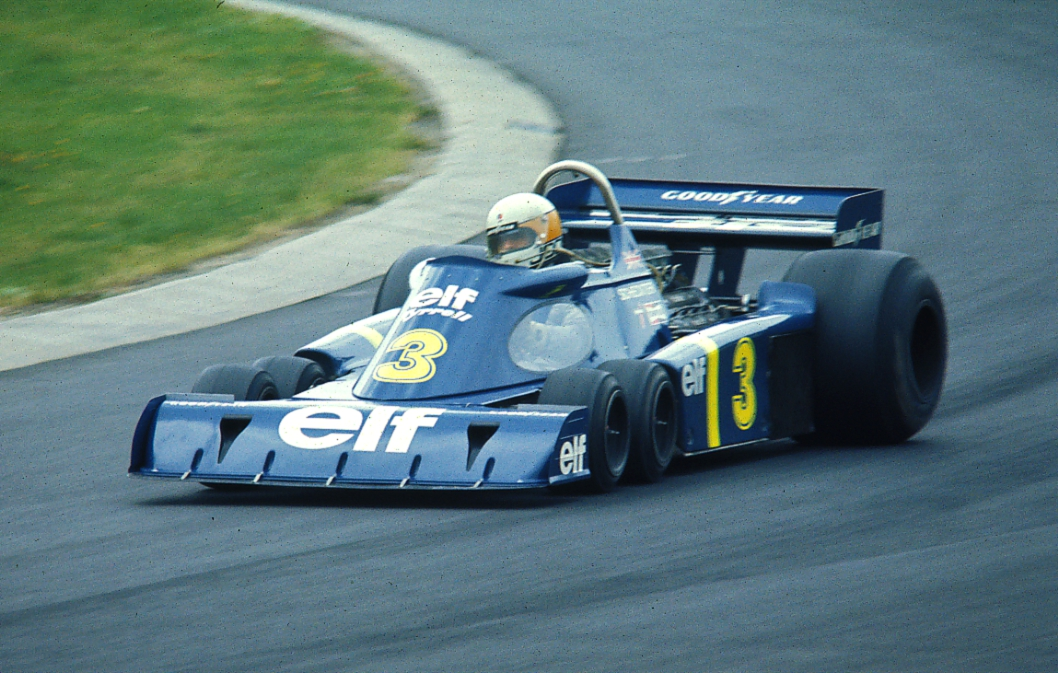
Jody Scheckter Tyrrell P34-Ford in Südkehre

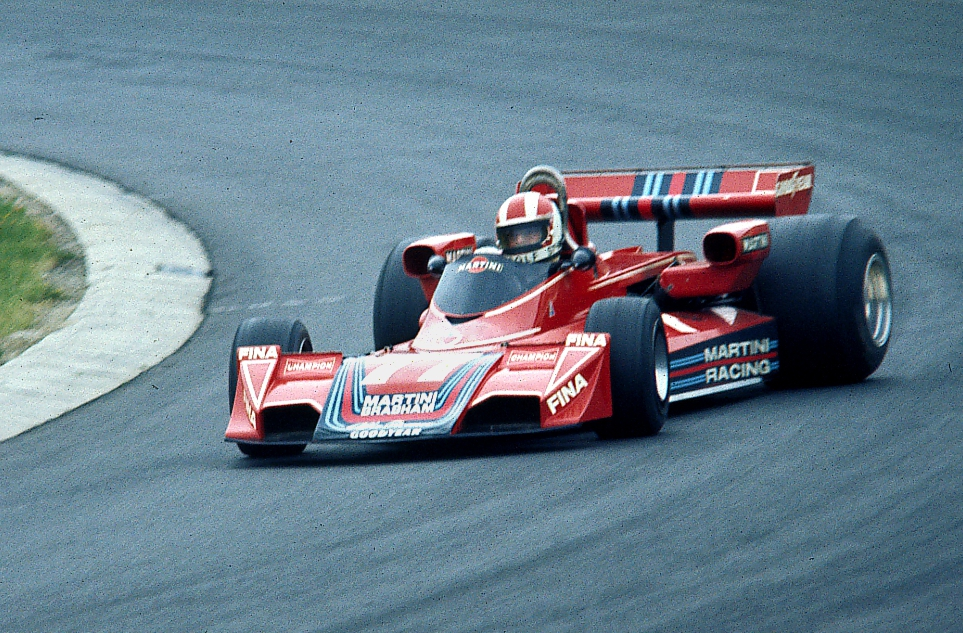
Rolf Stommelen

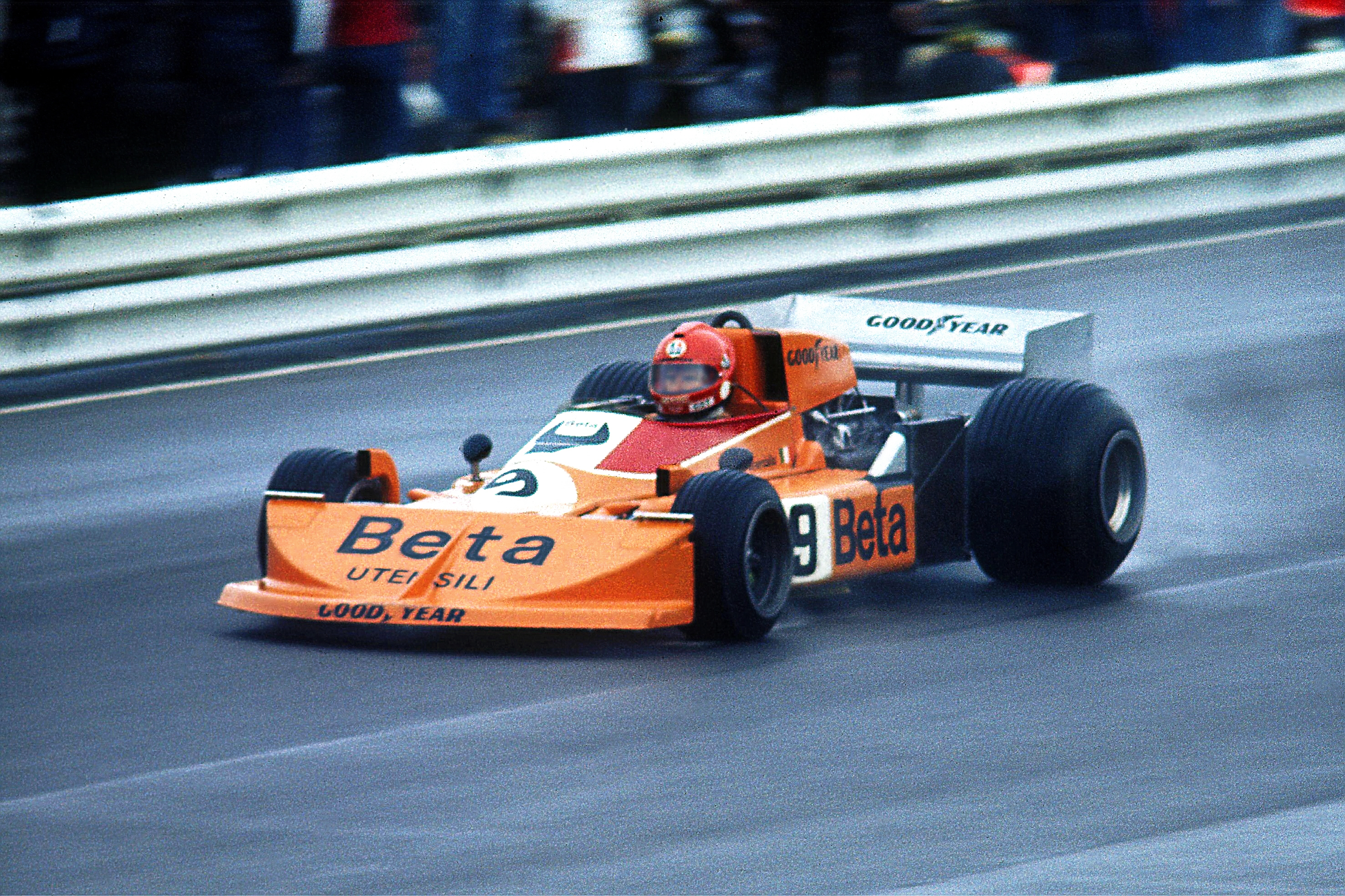
Vittorio Brambilla, March 761-Ford

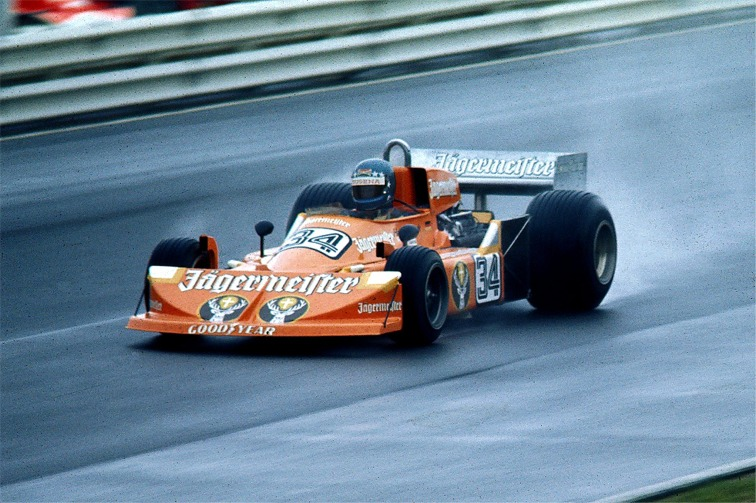
Hans-Joachim Stuck. Note the high roll bar, compared to Brambilla's

Pos	No	Driver	Constructor	Time	Gap
1	11	(United Kingdom) James Hunt	McLaren-Ford	7:06.5	—
2	1	(Austria) Niki Lauda	Ferrari	7:07.4	+0.9
3	4	(France) Patrick Depailler	Tyrrell-Ford	7:08.8	+2.3
4	34	(West Germany) Hans Joachim Stuck	March-Ford	7:09.1	+2.6
5	2	(Switzerland) Clay Regazzoni	Ferrari	7:09.3	+2.8
6	26	(France) Jacques Laffite	Ligier-Matra	7:11.3	+4.8
7	8	(Brazil) Carlos Pace	Brabham-Alfa Romeo	7:12.0	+5.5
8	3	(South Africa) Jody Scheckter	Tyrrell-Ford	7:12.2	+5.7
9	12	(West Germany) Jochen Mass	McLaren-Ford	7:13.0	+6.7
10	7	(Argentina) Carlos Reutemann	Brabham-Alfa Romeo	7:14.9	+8.4
11	10	(Sweden) Ronnie Peterson	March-Ford	7:14.9	+8.4
12	5	(United States) Mario Andretti	Lotus-Ford	7:14.9	+9.6
13	9	(Italy) Vittorio Brambilla	March-Ford	7:17.7	+11.2
14	19	(Australia) Alan Jones	Surtees-Ford	7:17.7	+13.4
15	36	(West Germany) Rolf Stommelen	Brabham-Ford	7:21.6	+15.1
15	77	(West Germany) Rolf Stommelen	Brabham-Alfa Romeo	7:21.6	+15.1
16	6	(Sweden) Gunnar Nilsson	Lotus-Ford	7:23.0	+16.5
17	22	(New Zealand) Chris Amon	Ensign-Ford	7:23.1	+16.6
18	16	(United Kingdom) Tom Pryce	Shadow-Ford	7:23.3	+16.8
19	28	(United Kingdom) John Watson	Penske-Ford	7:23.5	+17.0
20	30	(Brazil) Emerson Fittipaldi	Fittipaldi-Ford	7:28.0	+21.5
21	20	(Italy) Arturo Merzario	Wolf-Williams-Ford	7:28.8	+22.3
22	24	(Austria) Harald Ertl	Hesketh-Ford	7:30.0	+23.5
23	17	(France) Jean-Pierre Jarier	Shadow-Ford	7:30.9	+24.4
24	18	(United States) Brett Lunger	Surtees-Ford	7:32.7	+26.2
25	25	(United Kingdom) Guy Edwards	Hesketh-Ford	7:38.6	+32.1
26	40	(Italy) Alessandro Pesenti-Rossi	Tyrrell-Ford	7:48.5	+42.0
DNQ	37	(Italy) Lella Lombardi	Brabham-Ford	7:51.1	+44.6
DNQ	38	(France) Henri Pescarolo	Surtees-Ford	8:04.2	+57.7

- Stommelen used a #36 Brabham BT44B in both practice sessions on Friday, but his car was seized by police. He then used a #77 Brabham BT45 in the last practice session on Saturday and the race.

=== Race ===
Pos	No	Driver	Constructor	Laps	Time/Retired	Grid	Points
1	11	(United Kingdom) James Hunt	McLaren-Ford	14	1:41:42.7	1	9
2	3	(South Africa) Jody Scheckter	Tyrrell-Ford	14	+ 27.7	8	6
3	12	(West Germany) Jochen Mass	McLaren-Ford	14	+ 52.4	9	4
4	8	(Brazil) Carlos Pace	Brabham-Alfa Romeo	14	+ 54.2	7	3
5	6	(Sweden) Gunnar Nilsson	Lotus-Ford	14	+ 1:57.3	16	2
6	77	(West Germany) Rolf Stommelen	Brabham-Alfa Romeo	14	+ 2:30.3	15	1
7	28	(United Kingdom) John Watson	Penske-Ford	14	+ 2:33.9	19	
8	16	(United Kingdom) Tom Pryce	Shadow-Ford	14	+ 2:48.2	18	
9	2	(Switzerland) Clay Regazzoni	Ferrari	14	+ 3:46.0	5	
10	19	(Australia) Alan Jones	Surtees-Ford	14	+ 3:47.3	14	
11	17	(France) Jean-Pierre Jarier	Shadow-Ford	14	+ 4:51.7	23	
12	5	(United States) Mario Andretti	Lotus-Ford	14	+ 4:58.1	12	
13	30	(Brazil) Emerson Fittipaldi	Fittipaldi-Ford	14	+ 5:25.2	20	
14	40	(Italy) Alessandro Pesenti-Rossi	Tyrrell-Ford	13	+ 1 lap	26	
15	25	(United Kingdom) Guy Edwards	Hesketh-Ford	13	+ 1 lap	25	
Ret	20	(Italy) Arturo Merzario	Wolf-Williams-Ford	3	Brakes	21	
Ret	9	(Italy) Vittorio Brambilla	March-Ford	1	Accident	13	
Ret	4	(France) Patrick Depailler	Tyrrell-Ford	0	Accident	3	
Ret	7	(Argentina) Carlos Reutemann	Brabham-Alfa Romeo	0	Fuel System	10	
Ret	10	(Sweden) Ronnie Peterson	March-Ford	0	Accident	11	
Ret	34	(West Germany) Hans Joachim Stuck	March-Ford	0	Clutch	4	
Ret	26	(France) Jacques Laffite	Ligier-Matra	0	Gearbox	6	
Ret	22	(New Zealand) Chris Amon	Ensign-Ford	(1)	Withdrew after first race	17	
Ret	1	(Austria) Niki Lauda	Ferrari	(1)	Accident in first race	2	
Ret	18	(United States) Brett Lunger	Surtees-Ford	(1)	Accident in first race	24	
Ret	24	(Austria) Harald Ertl	Hesketh-Ford	(1)	Accident in first race	22	
DNS	36	(West Germany) Rolf Stommelen	Brabham-Ford		Car seized by Police		
DNQ	37	(Italy) Lella Lombardi	Brabham-Ford		Car seized by Police		
DNQ	38	(France) Henri Pescarolo	Surtees-Ford				

== Notes ==
- This was the Formula One World Championship debut for Italian driver Alessandro Pesenti-Rossi.
- This was the 10th Grand Prix start for Ligier.

== Championship standings after the race ==
Drivers' Championship standings

Pos	Driver	Points
1	(Austria) Niki Lauda	58
2	(United Kingdom) James Hunt	44
3	(South Africa) Jody Scheckter	34
4	(France) Patrick Depailler	26
5	(Switzerland) Clay Regazzoni	16

Constructors' Championship standings

	Pos	Constructor	Points
	1	(Italy) Ferrari	61
1	2	(United Kingdom) McLaren-Ford	49 (50)
1	3	(United Kingdom) Tyrrell-Ford	47
	4	(France) Ligier-Matra	10
	5	(United States) Penske-Ford	9

- Note: Only the top five positions are included for both sets of standings. Only the best seven results from the first eight races and the best seven results from the last eight races counted towards the Championship. Numbers without parentheses are Championship points; numbers in parentheses are total points scored. Points do not reflect final results of 1976 British Grand Prix as it was under appeal.

Previous race: 1976 British Grand Prix	FIA Formula One World Championship; 1976 season	Next race: 1976 Austrian Grand Prix
Previous race: 1975 German Grand Prix	German Grand Prix	Next race: 1977 German Grand Prix; Next race at the Nürburgring: 1984 European Grand Prix
