= Brabham BT45 =

Formula One racing car

Brabham BT45 Brabham BT45B Brabham BT45C
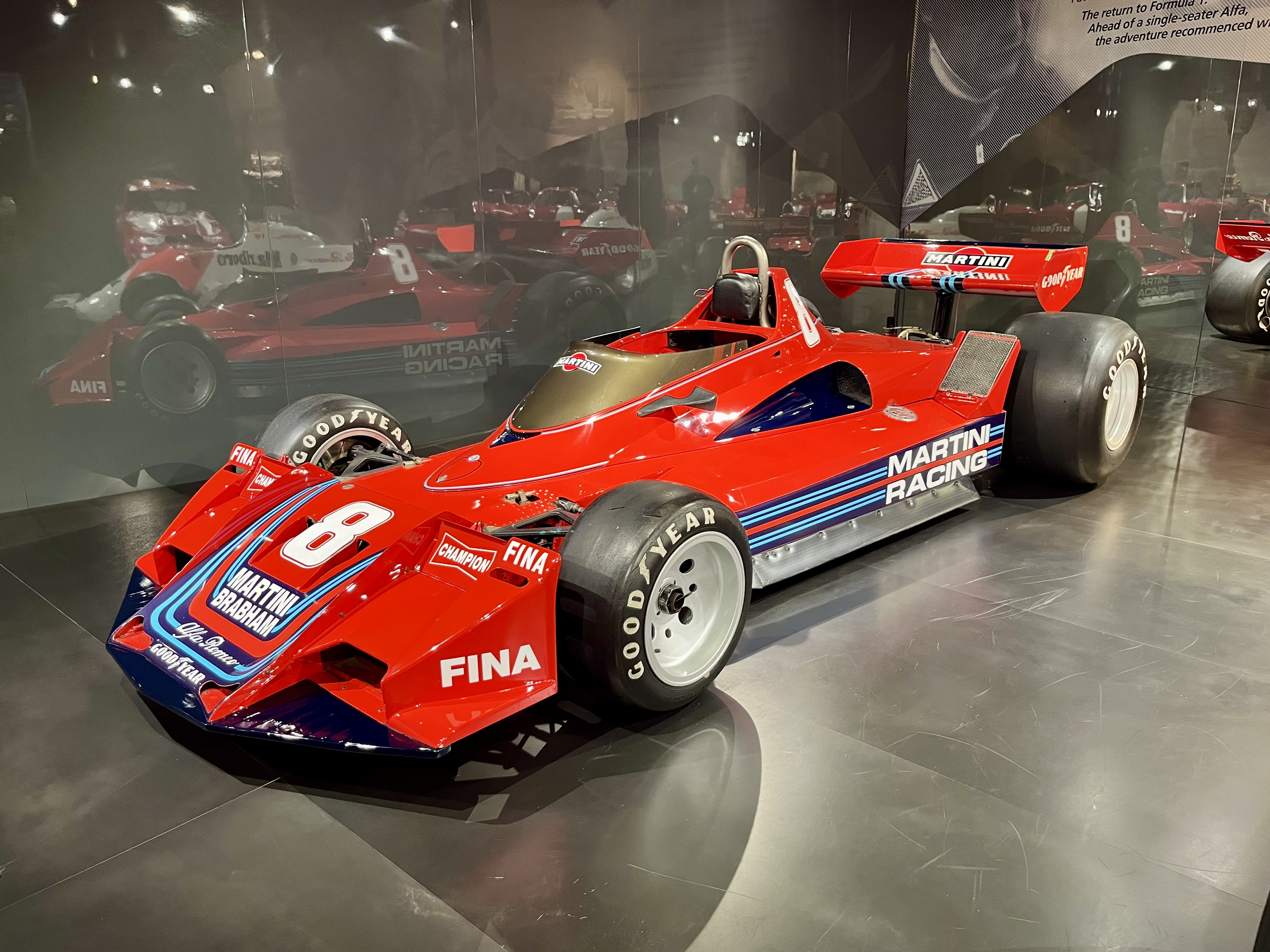
- The Brabham-Alfa Romeo BT45B of Carlos Pace
- Category: Formula One
- Constructor: Brabham
- Designers: Gordon Murray; Carlo Chiti (Alfa Romeo engine designer)
- Predecessor: BT44
- Successor: BT46

Technical specifications
- Chassis: aluminium monocoque
- Suspension (front): double wishbones, pull-rod actuated coil springs over dampers, anti-roll bar
- Suspension (rear): single top links, twin lower links, twin radius arms, coil springs over dampers, anti-roll bar
- Axle track: Front: 1,448 mm (57.0 in); Rear: 1,524 mm (60.0 in)
- Wheelbase: 2,464 mm (97.0 in)
- Engine: Alfa Romeo 115-12 and Ford-Cosworth DFV 2,995 cc (182.8 cu in), Flat-12 NA, mid-engine, longitudinally mounted
- Transmission: Hewland, Brabham 6-speed manual
- Fuel: 1976-1977: FINA; 1978: Agip
- Tyres: Goodyear

Competition history
- Notable entrants: Martini Racing; Parmalat Racing Team
- Notable drivers: (Brazil) Carlos Pace (Argentina) Carlos Reutemann (West Germany) Rolf Stommelen (United Kingdom) John Watson (West Germany) Hans-Joachim Stuck (Austria) Niki Lauda
- Debut: 1976 Brazilian Grand Prix
- Last season: 1979
Races	Wins	Poles	F/Laps
36 (all variants)	0	1	2
- Constructors' Championships: 0
- Drivers' Championships: 0

The Brabham BT45 was a Formula One car designed by South African engineer Gordon Murray for the 1976, 1977 and 1978 Formula One seasons.

== Design ==
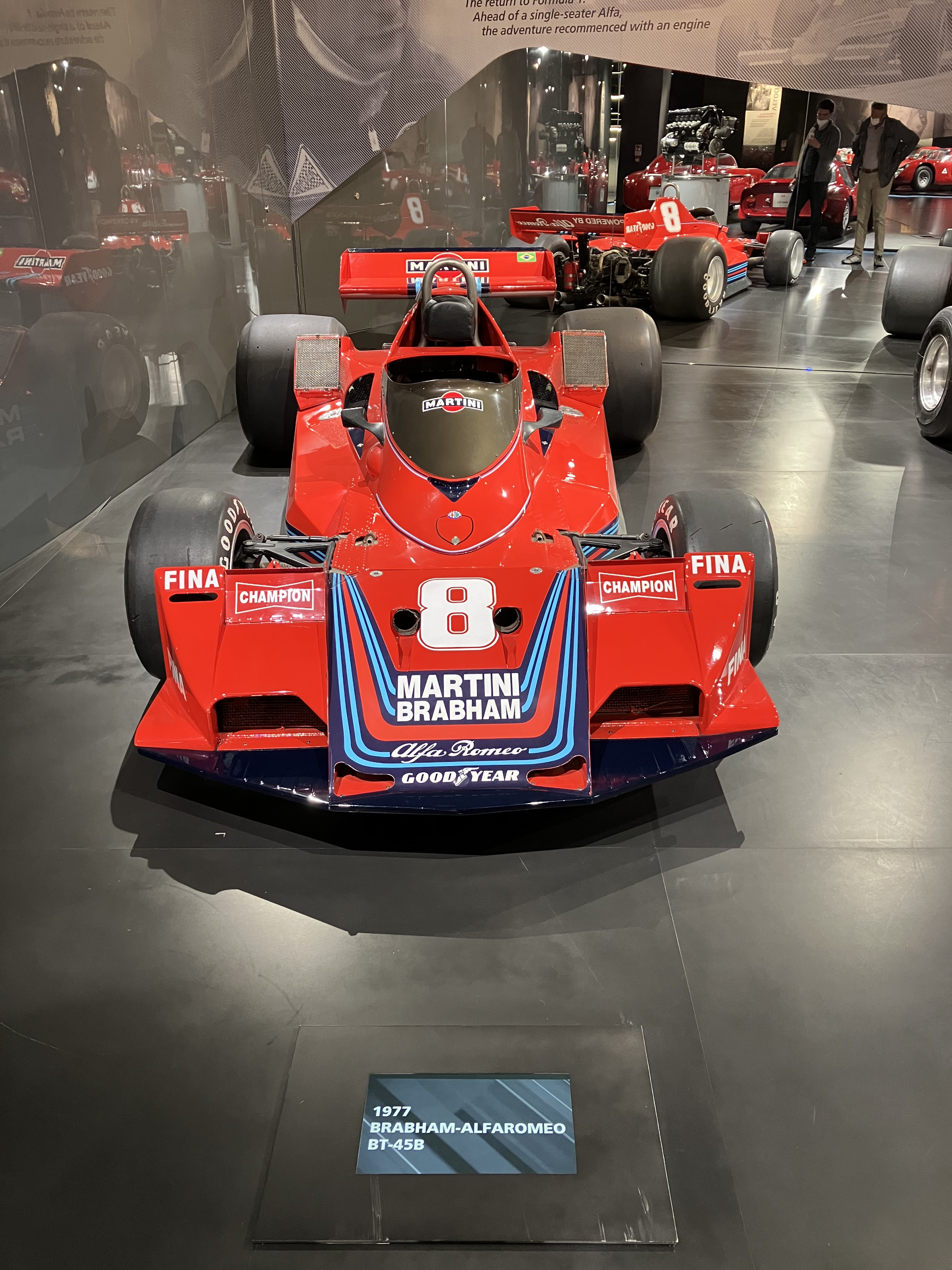
BT45B at the Alfa Romeo Museum

The car was the first Brabham to use Alfa Romeo type 115-12 flat 12-cylinder engine with 500 hp (373 kW) and 340 N⋅m (251 lb⋅ft) of torque. It was equipped with a Hewland six-speed transmission. It used the front air intakes of the previous Brabham, but by regulation no longer has the air brooms behind the cockpit and has side panels with larger air intakes to feed the engine and more radiant surfaces. The frame was an aluminium monocoque, while the braking system was constituted by ventilated disc brakes produced by Girling. The front suspension consisted of double wishbones with pull-rods, coil springs and stabilizer bars, while the rear used coil springs and stabilizer bars. For the 1978 season, pending the development of BT46, a C version of the BT45 was created. This model was equipped with a revised radiator.

== Race history ==
The BT45 had its first start at the 1976 Brazilian Grand Prix in the hands of Carlos Pace and Carlos Reutemann. They suffered reliability problems, especially the engine. During the first season, the best results were three-fourth places.

In 1977 Pace finished second in the first race and led for thirteen laps in South Africa with the BT45B, and died a few days later in a plane crash. His teammate, John Watson, drove to the pole at the Monaco Grand Prix but was passed on the first lap by Jody Scheckter's Wolf, after that he spent more than half of the race in second position, before retiring with gearbox problems. He then took second place in France, and Stuck gained two podiums, in Germany and Austria. Its results allowed the German to finish 11th overall in the Championship.

The BT45C competed in two Grands Prix in 1978, before the arrival of the BT46. With this latest release, Niki Lauda achieved two podiums. Jackie Stewart tested an early BT45C (chassis number 8) in 1978 and returned an overall favourable impression of the car as well as the team, with the smooth, torquey Alfa Romeo flat-twelve and the Brabham gearbox coming in for particular praise. The chassis was not yet fully sorted and Stewart disliked the cable-operated clutch; but the Brabham was still the fastest car he ran in a series of tests at Paul Ricard.

== Complete Formula One World Championship results ==
(key) (results in bold indicate pole position, results in italics indicate fastest lap)

Year	Entrant	Engine	Chassis	Tyres	Drivers	1	2	3	4	5	6	7	8	9	10	11	12	13	14	15	16	17	Points	WCC
1976	Martini Racing	Alfa Romeo F12	BT45	G		BRA	RSA	USW	ESP	BEL	MON	SWE	FRA	GBR	GER	AUT	NED	ITA	CAN	USE	JPN		9	9th
1976	Martini Racing	Alfa Romeo F12	BT45	G	Carlos Pace	10	Ret	9	6	Ret	9	8	4	8	4	Ret	Ret	Ret	7	Ret	Ret		9	9th
1976	Martini Racing	Alfa Romeo F12	BT45	G	Carlos Reutemann	12	Ret	Ret	4	Ret	Ret	Ret	11	Ret	Ret	Ret	Ret						9	9th
1976	Martini Racing	Alfa Romeo F12	BT45	G	Rolf Stommelen										6			Ret					9	9th
1976	Martini Racing	Alfa Romeo F12	BT45	G	Larry Perkins														17	Ret	Ret		9	9th
1977	Martini Racing	Alfa Romeo F12	BT45B	G		ARG	BRA	RSA	USW	ESP	MON	BEL	SWE	FRA	GBR	GER	AUT	NED	ITA	USE	CAN	JPN	27	5th
1977	Martini Racing	Alfa Romeo F12	BT45B	G	John Watson	Ret	Ret	6	DSQ	Ret	**Ret**	Ret	5	2	Ret	Ret	8	Ret	Ret	12	Ret	Ret	27	5th
1977	Martini Racing	Alfa Romeo F12	BT45B	G	Carlos Pace	2	Ret	13															27	5th
1977	Martini Racing	Alfa Romeo F12	BT45B	G	Hans-Joachim Stuck				Ret	6	Ret	6	10	Ret	5	3	3	7	Ret	Ret	Ret	7	27	5th
1977	Martini Racing	Alfa Romeo F12	BT45B	G	Giorgio Francia														DNQ				27	5th
1978	Parmalat Racing Team	Alfa Romeo F12	BT45C	G		ARG	BRA	RSA	USW	MON	BEL	ESP	SWE	FRA	GBR	GER	AUT	NED	ITA	USE	CAN		53^{1}	3rd^{1}
1978	Parmalat Racing Team	Alfa Romeo F12	BT45C	G	Niki Lauda	2	3																53^{1}	3rd^{1}
1978	Parmalat Racing Team	Alfa Romeo F12	BT45C	G	John Watson	Ret	8																53^{1}	3rd^{1}

^1 This total includes points scored using the Brabham BT46.
