= Jim Russell (racing driver) =

English racing driver (1920–2019)

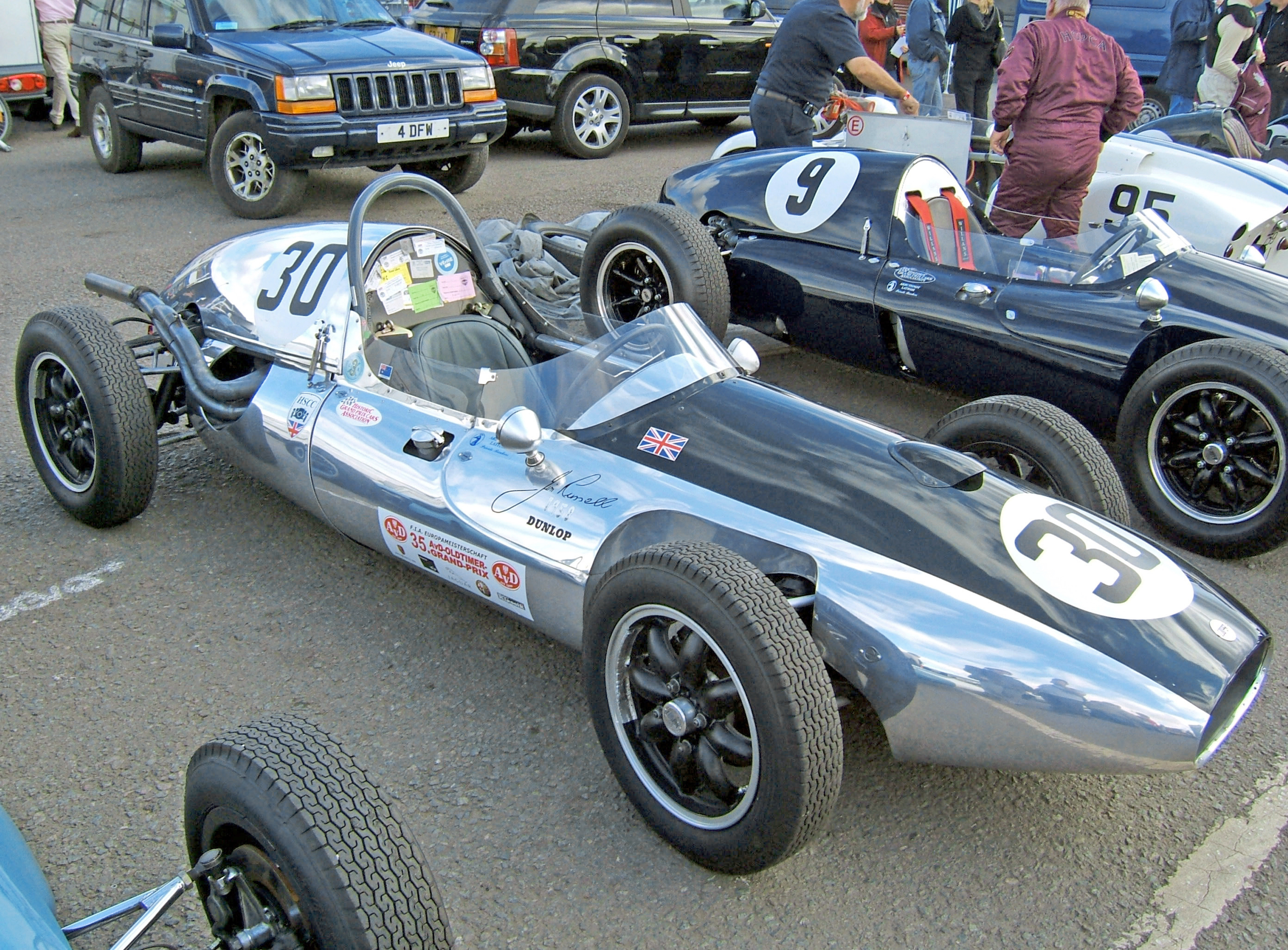
- Ex-Jim Russell Cooper T45 at Donington in 2007
- Born: Herbert James Russell; 28 May 1920; England
- Died: 30 March 2019 (aged 98)
- Occupation: racing driver
- Known for: Founder of Jim Russell Racing Driver School

Herbert James Russell (28 May 1920 – 30 March 2019), better known as Jim Russell, was an English racing driver, garage owner and founder of the Jim Russell Racing Driver School. He died on 30 March 2019, shortly after undergoing an operation for a hip replacement.

== Early life and garage ==
Russell was born at his parents' fish and chip shop and lived most of his life in Downham Market, Norfolk. His first job was selling ice cream. After serving with the RAF during World War II, he became a garage owner.

By 1960, the garage, filling station and race schools were employing over 100 people. The car garage closed and was demolished in November 2007 with the land destined for new housing. In late 2013 the first units were marketed on an exclusive, gated development called Russell Gardens.

== Racing career ==
Russell's driving career began at the age of 32, when a friend invited him to go to his local Snetterton race circuit. Starting with a 500 cc Cooper with a J.A.P. engine, Russell quickly progressed to a Manx Norton engine fettled by established motorcycle tuner Steve Lancefield. He then moved up to Formula Three and Formula Two.

Between 1953 and 1959 he won 64 Formula Three races, 11 Formula Two races and 6 sports car races. He won the British Formula Three Championship for three successive years from 1955 to 1957 in the company of established drivers Les Leston and newcomer John Surtees. Russell's racing career ended after suffering injuries in a crash at Le Mans in 1959, meeting his future wife Jennifer who was a nurse at a Norwich hospital. He went on to run a stud farm from his house at Bardwell Manor, Suffolk.

== Racing driver school ==
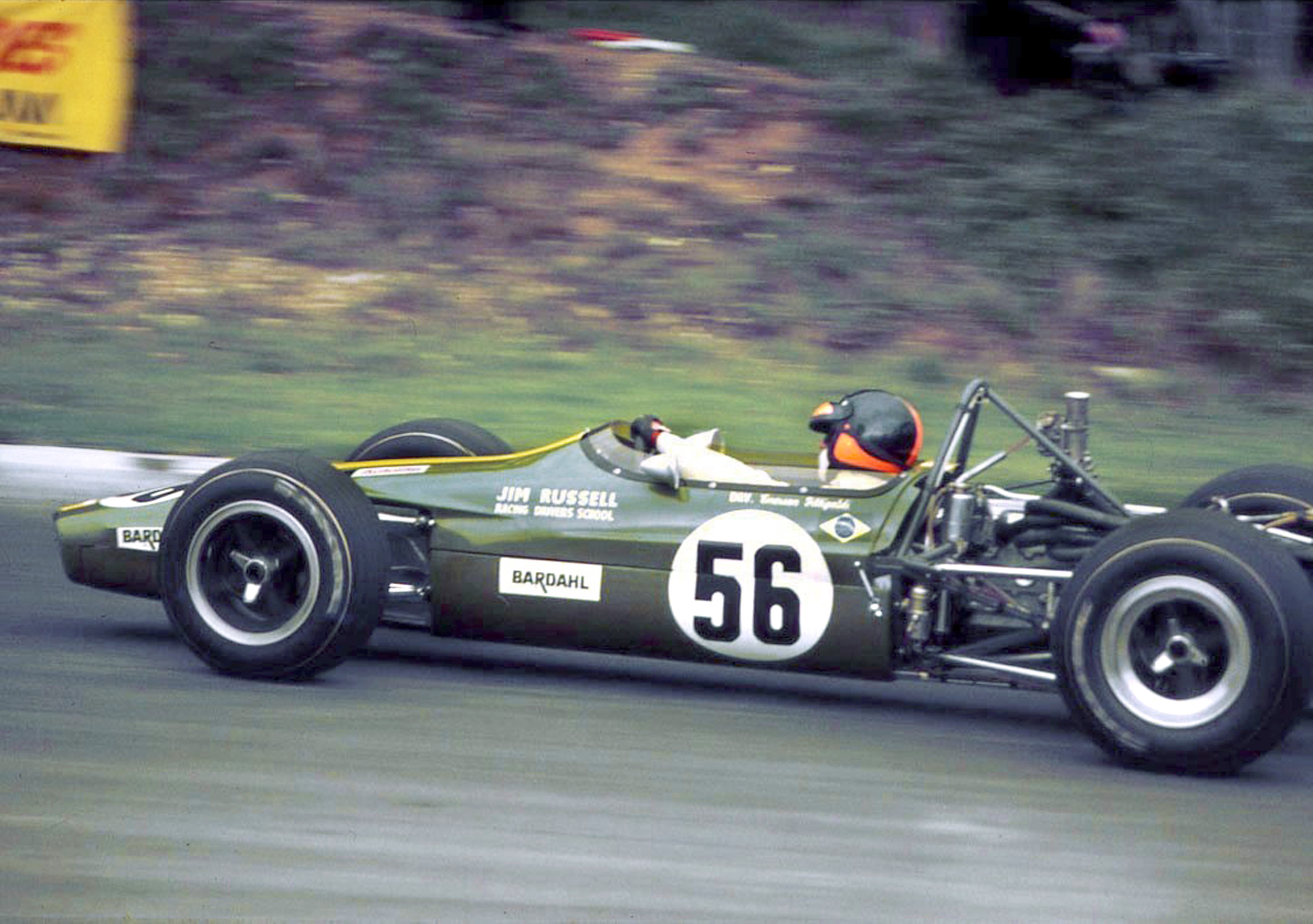
Emerson Fittipaldi in a Jim Russell Racing Drivers School Lotus 59 in the 1969 Guards Trophy at Brands Hatch

In 1956, Russell set up the first motor racing school at Snetterton. It was very successful and Jim Russell Racing Driver Schools have played a role in the development of many young drivers. In British Formula Three, Emerson Fittipaldi won the 1969 British Formula 3 Championship and Carlos Pace won the 1970 Forward Trust Championship with the school. Other notable drivers include Derek Bell, Danny Sullivan, Tiff Needell, Teddy Pilette, Nando Parrado, and Jacques Villeneuve.

In 1966, Russell trained actors Yves Montand, Brian Bedford, and Antonio Sabàto Sr. for their roles as race car drivers in John Frankenheimer's film, Grand Prix. Lead actor James Garner had the most natural ability, so Bob Bondurant was assigned to work with him at Willow Springs so he could learn how to handle a race car for his starring role. The name brand 'Jim Russell' continues with franchised race driving schools.

== Racing team ==
With the success of the driver school, Russell entered promising drivers in Formula 3 races in a Jim Russell Racing Driver School sponsored car. This included Emerson Fittipaldi in a Lotus 59 who won nine F3 races in the MCD Lombard Championship to become the 1969 champion.
