= Richard Robarts =

British racing driver (born 1944)

- Born: 22 September 1944 (age 82); Bicknacre, Essex, England

Formula One World Championship career
- Nationality: (United Kingdom) British
- Active years: 1974
- Team(s): Brabham, Williams
- Entries: 4 (3 starts)
- Championships: 0
- Wins: 0
- Podiums: 0
- Career points: 0
- Pole positions: 0
- Fastest laps: 0
- First entry: 1974 Argentine Grand Prix
- Last entry: 1974 Swedish Grand Prix

Richard Robarts (born 22 September 1944) is a British former racing driver from England. He participated in four Formula One World Championship Grands Prix, debuting on 13 January 1974. He scored no championship points.

Robarts began his career in Formula Ford, competing from 1969 to 1972. In 1973, he drove a GRD in Formula Three and shared the Lombard North Central, British Formula 3 championship with Tony Brise.

After paying for an F1 drive with Brabham in 1974, Robarts lost it after three races to the better-funded Rikky von Opel. He later found a seat with Williams, but before Robarts could start a race, the team gave the opportunity to Tom Belsø instead. Robarts later raced in Formula 2 before moving on to other series.

== Complete Formula One World Championship results ==
(key)

Year	Entrant	Chassis	Engine	1	2	3	4	5	6	7	8	9	10	11	12	13	14	15	WDC	Points
1974	Motor Racing Developments	Brabham BT44	Cosworth V8	ARG; Ret	BRA; 15	RSA; 17													NC	0
1974	Frank Williams Racing Cars	Iso-Marlboro FW	Cosworth V8				ESP	BEL	MON	SWE; DNS	NED	FRA	GBR	GER	AUT	ITA	CAN	USA	NC	0
