= 1974 Argentine Grand Prix =

Race details
- Date: January 13, 1974
- Official name: XI Gran Premio de la Republica Argentina
- Location: Autodromo Municipal Ciudad de Buenos Aires; Buenos Aires, Argentina
- Course: Permanent racing facility
- Course length: 5.968 km (3.708 miles)
- Distance: 53 laps, 316.315 km (196.549 miles)
- Weather: Hot and sunny

Pole position
Driver	(Sweden) Ronnie Peterson	Lotus-Ford
- Time: 1:50.78

Fastest lap
Driver	(Switzerland) Clay Regazzoni	Ferrari
- Time: 1:52.10 on lap 38

Podium
First	(New Zealand) Denny Hulme	McLaren-Ford
Second	(Austria) Niki Lauda	Ferrari
Third	(Switzerland) Clay Regazzoni	Ferrari

The 1974 Argentine Grand Prix was a Formula One motor race held in Buenos Aires on 13 January 1974. It was race 1 of 15 in both the 1974 World Championship of Drivers and the 1974 International Cup for Formula One Manufacturers. The 53-lap race was won by McLaren driver Denny Hulme after he started from tenth position. Niki Lauda finished second for the Ferrari team and his teammate Clay Regazzoni came in third.

For the first time, Formula One's visit to the Buenos Aires circuit saw them use the long and fast No.15 configuration, rather than the previously used No.9 layout. This race was also the 8th and last victory of Hulme's Formula One career and, as of 2025, the last for a New Zealand driver.

== Report ==
It had been one of the most frantic close seasons ever with only Ronnie Peterson, Denny Hulme, Carlos Reutemann and James Hunt remaining with their teams. Emerson Fittipaldi moved from Lotus to McLaren to be replaced by Jacky Ickx. McLaren now had sponsorship from Marlboro and Texaco. The team also entered a third car in their old colours of Yardley for Mike Hailwood. Hailwood's place at Surtees was taken by Jochen Mass where he partnered Carlos Pace, whilst Peter Revson had moved from McLaren to Shadow, where he was joined by Jean-Pierre Jarier.

Niki Lauda and Clay Regazzoni remained teammates but would be driving for Ferrari instead of BRM, who now with Motul sponsorship had three cars driven by Frenchmen Jean-Pierre Beltoise, Henri Pescarolo and François Migault. With the death of François Cevert and the retirement of Jackie Stewart, Tyrrell had an entirely new line-up in Jody Scheckter and Patrick Depailler.

Wilson Fittipaldi left Formula One temporarily to start his own team (returning with it in 1975), so his place along Reutemann at Brabham was taken by Richard Robarts. A privateer Brabham was run by John Goode Racing for John Watson under the Hexagon of Highgate banner. Howden Ganley and Hans Stuck were picked up by March Engineering.

Marlboro continued to back Frank Williams and his Iso-Marlboro-Ford FW for former Ferrari driver, Arturo Merzario. While Hesketh Racing were building their own car back in England, they entered James Hunt in a year-old March, while Graham Hill had Lola Cars build two cars for himself and Guy Edwards. Rikky von Opel completed the field, once again driving for Team Ensign.

=== Qualifying ===
Peterson secured pole position, for John Player Team Lotus, averaging a speed of 120.542 mph. However, Scuderia Ferrari showed how much progress they had made during the winter, under the new management, led by Luca di Montezemolo, with Regazzoni qualifying alongside the Swede on the front row. The second row featured the McLaren of Fittipaldi and the Shadow of Revson, while James Hunt impressed in his Harvey Postlethwaite modified Hesketh March by taking fifth place on the grid.

=== Race ===
Peterson took an early lead from the fast starting Hunt, while Regazzoni, Revson and Hailwood all arrived at the first corner together and collided. Regazzoni and Revson spun, then Revson’s team-mate, Jarier ran into him. The cars of Merzario and Watson were also damaged in the melee, as Scheckter took to the grass in avoidance.

After Hunt spun later on the opening lap, Reutemann moved into second, with Fittipaldi, Hailwood, Ickx and Hulme completing the top six. By lap three, Reutemann took the lead, while Fittipaldi visited the pits to have a plug lead reattached. This promoted Hailwood to third. By this stage, Ickx had dropped behind Hulme, but soon both were past the Yardley McLaren. Peterson began to fade due to brake trouble and was overtaken by Hulme and Ickx. By now Ickx was beginning to come under pressure from the Ferrari of Niki Lauda.

On lap 27, the second Lotus was now in trouble, as Ickx pitted with a puncture. This left Lauda in a solid third place. The local hero, Reutemann seem to have the race under control when his Cosworth powered Brabham BT44 began to misfire and Hulme rapidly closed him down. On the penultimate lap, Hulme was past, taking the lead. As for Reutemann, his eventually ground to a halt on the last lap, running out of fuel, and was classified seventh overall. As a result, the Ferraris of Lauda and Regazzoni inherited a two-three at the finish.

Hulme won in a time of 1hr 41:02.010mins., averaging a speed of 117.405 mph, and was 9.27 seconds ahead of Lauda. Regazzoni was a further 11.14 seconds behind. Only other drivers to complete the full race distance were Hailwood, Beltoise and Depailler.

== Classification ==
=== Qualifying ===
Pos.	Driver	Constructor	Time/Gap
1	(Sweden) Ronnie Peterson	Lotus–Ford	1:50.78
2	(Switzerland) Clay Regazzoni	Ferrari	+0.18
3	(Brazil) Emerson Fittipaldi	McLaren–Ford	+0.28
4	(United States) Peter Revson	Shadow–Ford	+0.52
5	(United Kingdom) James Hunt	March–Ford	+0.74
6	(Argentina) Carlos Reutemann	Brabham–Ford	+0.77
7	(Belgium) Jacky Ickx	Lotus–Ford	+0.92
8	(Austria) Niki Lauda	Ferrari	+1.03
9	(United Kingdom) Mike Hailwood	McLaren–Ford	+1.08
10	(New Zealand) Denny Hulme	McLaren–Ford	+1.28
11	(Brazil) Carlos Pace	Surtees–Ford	+1.42
12	(South Africa) Jody Scheckter	Tyrrell–Ford	+1.69
13	(Italy) Arturo Merzario	FWRC–Ford	+2.36
14	(France) Jean-Pierre Beltoise	BRM	+2.40
15	(France) Patrick Depailler	Tyrrell–Ford	+2.49
16	(France) Jean-Pierre Jarier	Shadow–Ford	+2.88
17	(United Kingdom) Graham Hill	Lola–Ford	+3.12
18	(West Germany) Jochen Mass	Surtees–Ford	+3.12
19	(New Zealand) Howden Ganley	March–Ford	+3.43
20	(United Kingdom) John Watson	Brabham–Ford	+3.61
21	(France) Henri Pescarolo	BRM	+3.89
22	(United Kingdom) Richard Robarts	Brabham–Ford	+3.95
23	(West Germany) Hans-Joachim Stuck	March–Ford	+4.41
24	(France) François Migault	BRM	+4.65
25	(United Kingdom) Guy Edwards	Lola–Ford	+5.65
26	(Liechtenstein) Rikky von Opel	Ensign–Ford	+7.08

=== Race ===
Pos	No	Driver	Constructor	Laps	Time/Retired	Grid	Points
1	6	(New Zealand) Denny Hulme	McLaren-Ford	53	1:41:02.01	10	9
2	12	(Austria) Niki Lauda	Ferrari	53	+ 9.27	8	6
3	11	(Switzerland) Clay Regazzoni	Ferrari	53	+ 20.41	2	4
4	33	(United Kingdom) Mike Hailwood	McLaren-Ford	53	+ 31.79	9	3
5	14	(France) Jean-Pierre Beltoise	BRM	53	+ 51.84	14	2
6	4	(France) Patrick Depailler	Tyrrell-Ford	53	+ 1:52.48	15	1
7	7	(Argentina) Carlos Reutemann	Brabham-Ford	52	Out of fuel	6	
8	10	(New Zealand) Howden Ganley	March-Ford	52	Out of fuel	19	
9	15	(France) Henri Pescarolo	BRM	52	+ 1 Lap	21	
10	5	(Brazil) Emerson Fittipaldi	McLaren-Ford	52	+ 1 Lap	3	
11	27	(United Kingdom) Guy Edwards	Lola-Ford	51	+ 2 Laps	25	
12	28	(United Kingdom) John Watson	Brabham-Ford	49	+ 4 Laps	20	
13	1	(Sweden) Ronnie Peterson	Lotus-Ford	48	+ 5 Laps	1	
Ret	26	(United Kingdom) Graham Hill	Lola-Ford	45	Engine	17	
Ret	2	(Belgium) Jacky Ickx	Lotus-Ford	36	Clutch	7	
Ret	8	(United Kingdom) Richard Robarts	Brabham-Ford	36	Gearbox	22	
Ret	9	(Germany) Hans Joachim Stuck	March-Ford	31	Clutch	23	
Ret	37	(France) François Migault	BRM	31	Water leak	24	
Ret	3	(South Africa) Jody Scheckter	Tyrrell-Ford	25	Engine	12	
Ret	18	(Brazil) Carlos Pace	Surtees-Ford	21	Suspension	11	
Ret	20	(Italy) Arturo Merzario	Iso-Marlboro-Ford	19	Overheating	13	
Ret	24	(United Kingdom) James Hunt	March-Ford	11	Overheating	5	
Ret	19	(Germany) Jochen Mass	Surtees-Ford	10	Engine	18	
Ret	16	(United States) Peter Revson	Shadow-Ford	1	Accident	4	
Ret	17	(France) Jean-Pierre Jarier	Shadow-Ford	0	Accident	16	
DNS	22	(Liechtenstein) Rikky von Opel	Ensign-Ford		Handling	26	

== Notes ==
- This was the Formula One World Championship debut for British drivers Richard Robarts and Guy Edwards, and German driver Hans-Joachim Stuck.
- This was the 61st pole position for a Ford-powered car, breaking the previous record set by Ferrari at the 1972 Italian Grand Prix.
- This was the 3rd win of an Argentine Grand Prix by a Ford-powered car, breaking the previous record set by Maserati at the 1957 Argentine Grand Prix.

== Championship standings after the race ==
Drivers' Championship standings

Pos	Driver	Points
1	(New Zealand) Denny Hulme	9
2	(Austria) Niki Lauda	6
3	(Switzerland) Clay Regazzoni	4
4	(United Kingdom) Mike Hailwood	3
5	(France) Jean-Pierre Beltoise	2

Constructors' Championship standings

Pos	Constructor	Points
1	(United Kingdom) McLaren-Ford	9
2	(Italy) Ferrari	6
3	(United Kingdom) BRM	2
4	(United Kingdom) Tyrrell-Ford	1

- Note: Only the top five positions are included for both sets of standings.

Previous race: 1973 United States Grand Prix	FIA Formula One World Championship; 1974 season	Next race: 1974 Brazilian Grand Prix
Previous race: 1973 Argentine Grand Prix	Argentine Grand Prix	Next race: 1975 Argentine Grand Prix
