= Carlos Pace =

Brazilian racing driver (1944–1977)

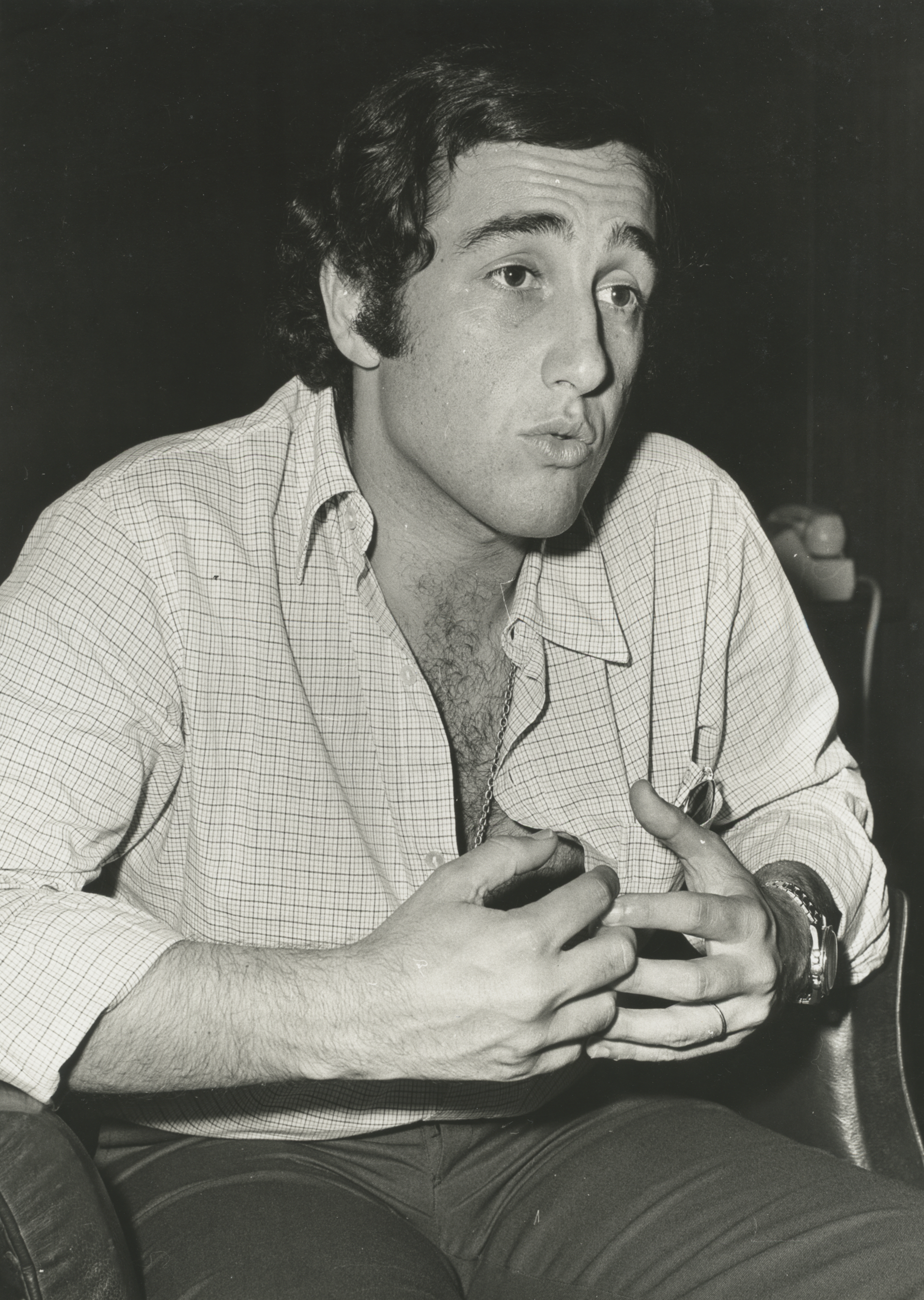
- Born: José Carlos Pace; 6 October 1944; São Paulo, Brazil
- Died: 18 March 1977 (aged 32); Mairiporã, São Paulo, Brazil
- Cause of death: Plane crash
- Resting place: Interlagos Circuit
- Spouse: Elda d'Andrea (m. 1968)
- Children: 2

Formula One World Championship career
- Nationality: (Brazil) Brazilian
- Active years: 1972–1977
- Team(s): Frank Williams, Surtees, Hexagon, Brabham
- Entries: 73 (72 starts)
- Championships: 0
- Wins: 1
- Podiums: 6
- Career points: 58
- Pole positions: 1
- Fastest laps: 5
- First entry: 1972 South African Grand Prix
- First win: 1975 Brazilian Grand Prix
- Last entry: 1977 South African Grand Prix

24 Hours of Le Mans career
- Years: 1973
- Teams: Ferrari
- Best finish: 2nd (1973)
- Class wins: 0

José Carlos Pace (Brazilian Portuguese pronunciation: [ʒoˈzɛ ˈkaʁlus ˈpatʃi]; 6 October 1944 – 18 March 1977) was a Brazilian racing driver, who competed in Formula One from 1972 to 1977. Pace won the 1975 Brazilian Grand Prix with Brabham.

Born and raised in São Paulo, Pace competed in Formula One for Williams, Surtees and Brabham. He finished sixth in the World Drivers' Championship in 1975 with the latter.

In March 1977, Pace was killed in a light aircraft accident in Mairiporã. The Interlagos Circuit in São Paulo was renamed the Autódromo José Carlos Pace upon his death, home of the Brazilian Grand Prix since 1972 and the location of his sole victory in Formula One. It also is his final resting place since 2024.

== Early life ==
José Carlos Pace was born in São Paulo, Brazil to Angelo Raphael Pace, a textiles businessman, and Amélia Pace. His father and his mother were Brazilians, both children of Italian immigrants. The family moved back to Italy for a part of Pace's childhood and upon returning to Brazil he was given the nickname 'Moco' because he could only speak Italian.After becoming fluent in Portuguese again, he was encouraged by friends Wilson and Emerson Fittipaldi to start karting. Pace studied accounting while his elder brothers helped their father. He first raced in a kart in 1960 and moved to cars in 1963.

== Career ==
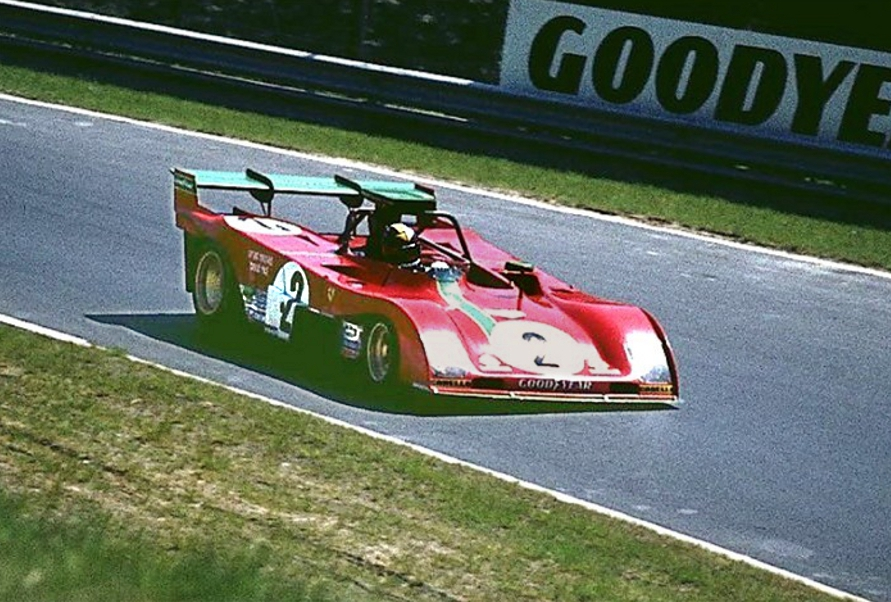
Pace driving a Ferrari 312PB at the Nürburgring in 1973.

Pace was a contemporary of the Fittipaldi brothers, Wilson and Emerson, and began racing in Brazil in the late 1960s. He travelled to Europe in 1970 and competed in British Formula 3, winning the Forward Trust Championship in a Lotus car. In 1971 he moved up to Formula Two with Frank Williams, but did not score any points from six races. Nevertheless, he moved up to Formula One in 1972, competing with a Williams-entered March. He scored points on two occasions and finished eighteenth in the Drivers' Championship. His best result came at the non-championship Victory Race, in which he finished in second position. He also competed in some further F2 and Can-Am races.

For 1973, Pace moved to the Surtees team and improved to eleventh place in the championship after scoring a fourth place in Germany and his first championship podium finish with third in Austria. He also set the fastest lap in both of these events. He also competed in three F2 races for Surtees, but his main racing activities outside F1 were in the World Sportscar Championship, in which he drove for the works Ferrari team. Sharing a 312PB with Arturo Merzario, the duo finished second at the Nürburgring and at Le Mans (after starting in pole position for the latter event), and third at Watkins Glen.

Pace remained with Surtees for 1974 and scored a fourth-place finish in Brazil, but parted company with the outfit mid-season after constant disagreements with the founder, John Surtees. He drove a privately entered Brabham for Goldie Hexagon Racing at the French Grand Prix but failed to qualify, before moving to the works team alongside namesake Carlos Reutemann for the next race. After initially struggling with the new machinery, he finished fifth and set the fastest lap at Monza, and repeated the feat on his way to second, behind Reutemann, at Watkins Glen, securing a one-two finish for Brabham.

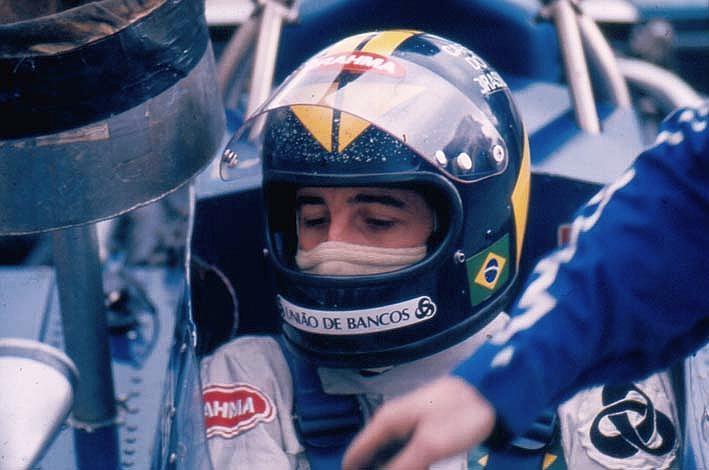
Pace at the Nürburgring in 1973.

The Brabham team's BT44B chassis were competitive throughout the 1975 season, allowing Pace and Reutemann to feature at the front of the grid. Pace duly took his first and only Formula One victory in front of his home crowd at the Brazilian Grand Prix, took his first pole position at the following race in South Africa, and also finished on the podium at Monaco and Silverstone, ending the season sixth overall in the Drivers' Championship and helping Brabham to second in the Constructors' Championship, behind Ferrari.

Pace remained with Brabham for 1976, but the car was much less competitive due to a change of engine, from Ford-Cosworth to Alfa Romeo. The Italian flat 12 units were larger, heavier, less reliable and less economical than their V8 predecessors, restricting Pace to fourteenth place in the championship, whilst Reutemann left the team before the end of the season.

By the start of the 1977 season, the competitiveness and durability of the Alfa engines had been much improved for Pace and his new teammate, John Watson. He demonstrated this fact by taking second position at the season opener in Argentina, and running strongly in the next two Grands Prix before suffering from mechanical trouble, but he was unable to capitalise on the improved performance for the rest of the season due to his sudden death.

== Personal life ==
Pace married Elda d'Andrea in 1968, his girlfriend of ten years. His father committed suicide in 1972 due to business related issues. Pace was not told until after he had achieved his maiden points at the Spanish Grand Prix, finishing sixth. His friend, Carlo Gancia, claimed Pace "loved his father more than anything". Pace returned to Brazil after the 1977 South African Grand Prix, heartbroken at the death of Tom Pryce. His wife Elda recalls "he was very upset. Most drivers were cool, they needed to be cool, but I saw him crying after accidents four or five times". Gancia added that "he was touched and moved by these things because everybody liked him and he made friends around the pitlane". After Pace died in 1977, long-time friend Bernie Ecclestone helped Elda to sort out finances and ensure they were well taken care of.

== In popular culture ==
In the 1977 motorsport film Bobby Deerfield, the eponymous title character is represented by Pace in the racing scenes.

== Death and honours ==
Pace was killed in a private light aircraft accident near São Paulo, Brazil on 18 March 1977, 13 days after fellow F1 driver Tom Pryce and marshal Frederik Jansen van Vuuren lost their lives during the 1977 South African Grand Prix. The Interlagos track, the scene of his only F1 win in 1975, was renamed Autódromo José Carlos Pace in his honour. He was buried in the Araçá cemetery in São Paulo.

In August 2024, Pace's body was transferred from his vandalized mausoleum to the race circuit to be laid to rest in the race track named after him. The idea for this was organized by the president of the Confederação Brasileira de Automobilismo (Brazilian Automobile Confederation) (CBA), Paulo “Loco” Figueiredo, the president of the Comissão Nacional de Carros Clássicos (National Classic Car Commission) and journalist Ricardo Caruso, as soon as they were informed of the carelessness and vandalism of Pace's mausoleum, in the Araçá cemetery, in São Paulo. Figueiredo and Caruso began a long battle against bureaucracy, which included meetings with municipal authorities, at least 15 trips to the cemetery, as well as searches in registry offices, collecting documents and various authorizations, just to give the departed racer his deserved respect, and all with the support and help of Pace's family, who were unaware of the situation of his grave in the cemetery and immediately authorized them to do whatever was necessary.

Finally, on August 23, Pace's body arrived in Interlagos, where he was buried next to the bust that stands there in his honor. The emotional ceremony was attended by Pace's family (his widow Elda, his children Patrícia and Rodrigo, and his grandchildren), friends, other drivers, journalists and admirers of “Moco”. Then, José Carlos Pace took one last lap around the track, where Rodrigo, “Moco's” son, drove a 1967 Karmann-Ghia racing car that was used by his father, from the old Dacon team, where José Carlos Pace formed a trio with none other than the Fittipaldi brothers of Emerson and Wilson Jr. at the time. Alongside Rodrigo was Maurício Marx, collector and current owner of the Karmann-Ghia, who took the urn with Pace's remains to his “final chequered flag”. This makes Pace the first departed driver ever to be buried in a race circuit.

His bust was damaged by a couple of inebriated fans during a fight following a Stock Car Brasil event in December 2025. The São Paulo state government issued a statement promising the reconstruction of a new bust in tribute to the driver.

== Racing record ==
=== Career summary ===
Season	Series	Team	Races	Wins	Poles	F/Laps	Podiums	Points	Position
1970	BRSCC Lombank British Formula Three	Jim Russell Racing Driver School	13	1	2	4	7	43	**3rd**
1970	BRSCC Motorsport/Shell British Formula Three	Jim Russell Racing Driver School	11	1	0	1	2	22	5th
1970	BARC Forward Trust British Formula Three	Jim Russell Racing Driver School	11	2	1	2	4	41	**1st**
1971	European Formula Two	Frank Williams Motul March	6	0	0	0	0	0	NC
1972	Formula One	Team Williams Motul	11	0	0	0	0	3	18th
1972	European Formula Two	Pygmée Racing Team	4	0	1	1	1	6	15th
1972	Can-Am	Advanced Vehicle Systems	3	0	0	0	0	10	15th
1973	Formula One	Brooke Bond Oxo Team Surtees	14	0	0	2	1	7	11th
1973	World Sportscar Championship	Ferrari SEFAC SpA	9	0	0	0	4	0	NC
1973	European Formula Two	Surtees Racing	3	0	0	0	0	0	NC
1973	24 Hours of Le Mans	Ferrari SEFAC SpA	1	0	0	0	1	N/A	**2nd**
1974	Formula One	Team Surtees Bang & Olufsen Team Surtees	7	0	0	0	0	11	12th
1974	Formula One	Motor Racing Developments	6	0	0	2	1	11	12th
1975	Formula One	Martini Racing	14	1	1	1	3	24	6th
1976	Formula One	Martini Racing	16	0	0	0	0	7	14th
1977	Formula One	Martini Racing	3	0	0	0	1	6	15th

=== Complete Formula One World Championship results ===
(key) (Races in bold indicate pole position / Races in italics indicate fastest lap)

Year	Entrant	Chassis	Engine	1	2	3	4	5	6	7	8	9	10	11	12	13	14	15	16	17	WDC	Points
1972	Team Williams Motul	March 711	Cosworth V8	ARG	RSA; 17	ESP; 6	MON; 17	BEL; 5	FRA; Ret	GBR; Ret	GER; NC	AUT; NC	ITA; Ret	CAN; 9	USA; Ret						18th	3
1973	Brooke Bond Oxo Team Surtees	Surtees TS14A	Cosworth V8	ARG; Ret	BRA; Ret	RSA; Ret	ESP; Ret	BEL; 8	MON; Ret	SWE; 10	FRA; 13	GBR; Ret	NED; 7	GER; 4	AUT; 3	ITA; Ret	CAN; 18	USA; Ret			11th	7
1974	Team Surtees	Surtees TS16	Cosworth V8	ARG; Ret	BRA; 4																12th	11
1974	Bang & Olufsen Team Surtees	Surtees TS16	Cosworth V8			RSA; 11	ESP; 13	BEL; Ret	MON; Ret	SWE; Ret	NED										12th	11
1974	Goldie Hexagon Racing	Brabham BT42	Cosworth V8									FRA; DNQ									12th	11
1974	Motor Racing Developments	Brabham BT44	Cosworth V8										GBR; 9	GER; 12	AUT; Ret	ITA; 5	CAN; 8	USA; 2			12th	11
1975	Martini Racing	Brabham BT44B	Cosworth V8	ARG; Ret	BRA; 1	**RSA**; 4	ESP; Ret	MON; 3	BEL; 8	SWE; Ret	NED; 5	FRA; Ret	GBR; 2	GER; Ret	AUT; Ret	ITA; Ret	USA; Ret				6th	24
1976	Martini Racing	Brabham BT45	Alfa Romeo Flat-12	BRA; 10	RSA; Ret	USW; 9	ESP; 6	BEL; Ret	MON; 9	SWE; 8	FRA; 4	GBR; 8	GER; 4	AUT; Ret	NED; Ret	ITA; Ret	CAN; 7	USA; Ret	JPN; Ret		14th	7
1977	Martini Racing	Brabham BT45	Alfa Romeo Flat-12	ARG; 2	BRA; Ret																15th	6
1977	Martini Racing	Brabham BT45B	Alfa Romeo Flat-12			RSA; 13	USW	ESP	MON	BEL	SWE	FRA	GBR	GER	AUT	NED	ITA	USA	CAN	JPN	15th	6

=== Complete Formula One Non-Championship results ===
(key) (Races in bold indicate pole position / Races in italics indicate fastest lap)

Year	Entrant	Chassis	Engine	1	2	3	4	5	6
1972	Team Williams Motul	March 711	Cosworth V8	ROC	BRA; Ret	INT	OUL	REP	
1972	Team Surtees	Surtees TS9B	Cosworth V8						VIC; 2
1973	Brooke Bond Oxo Team Surtees	Surtees TS14A	Cosworth V8	ROC	INT; Ret				
1974	Team Surtees	Surtees TS16	Cosworth V8	PRE; 9	ROC	INT			
1975	Martini Racing	Brabham BT44B	Cosworth V8	ROC	INT	SUI; 6			
1976	Martini Racing	Brabham BT45	Alfa Romeo Flat-12	ROC; Ret	INT; 9				

=== Complete 24 Hours of Le Mans results ===
Year	Team	Co-Drivers	Car	Class	Laps	Pos.	Class Pos.
1973	(Italy) Ferrari SEFAC SpA	(Italy) Arturo Merzario	Ferrari 312PB; Ferrari 312 F12 2991cc	S3.0	349	2nd	2nd

Sporting positions
Preceded by Roy Pike (1965)	British Formula 3 Championship; BARC Series Champion; 1970	Succeeded by Dave Walker
