= Bert Hawthorne =

New Zealand racing driver

Herbert William Hawthorne (17 December 1943 – 14 April 1972) was a New Zealand racing driver, born in Derryhennett, County Armagh, Northern Ireland, immigrated to New Zealand at 13 years of age. After racing in NZ, Europe, North and South America he was killed at the April 1972 Jim Clark Memorial F2 race at the Hockenheimring, at nearly the same place Clark died in 1968.

== Racing career ==
Hawthorne started racing in the mid-to-late 1960s with a Ford Anglia. He moved to the United Kingdom to work as a racing mechanic at Ron Tauranac's Brabham factory. He built a Brabham BT21 and shipped it back to New Zealand where he raced it in the National Formula category for twin-cam, 1600 cm3 engines. He became friends with Allan McCall, who was impressed with Hawthorne's racing talent.

Hawthorne returned to the UK with a limited budget to race in Formula 3, then went to the US to race in the North American Formula B/Atlantic Championship where he became vice-champion of the series in 1971.

On 27 Feb 1972, in Columbia, where some Temporada races were held successfully in 1971, Hawthorne won the Bogotá Formula B race, giving the built-for-F2 Brabham BT38 its maiden victory.

Hawthorne did not continue with Brabham but linked up again with McCall, who was developing a Formula 2 car under the banner "Leda Engineering". The team missed the season's first F2 race at Mallory Park on 12 March, also the British round at Oulton, but entered the second round on 3 April. Thus, Hawthorne's first proper Formula 2 race was the Jochen Rindt Memorial Trophy at Thruxton, a round of both the JPS-sponsored British and European Formula 2 Championships. Hawthorne qualified the Leda-Tui AM29 - Ford BDA with his Heet2 result at 22nd and was putting on an impressive display in the final race before retiring on lap 36 of 50 with a fuel pickup problem.

== Death ==
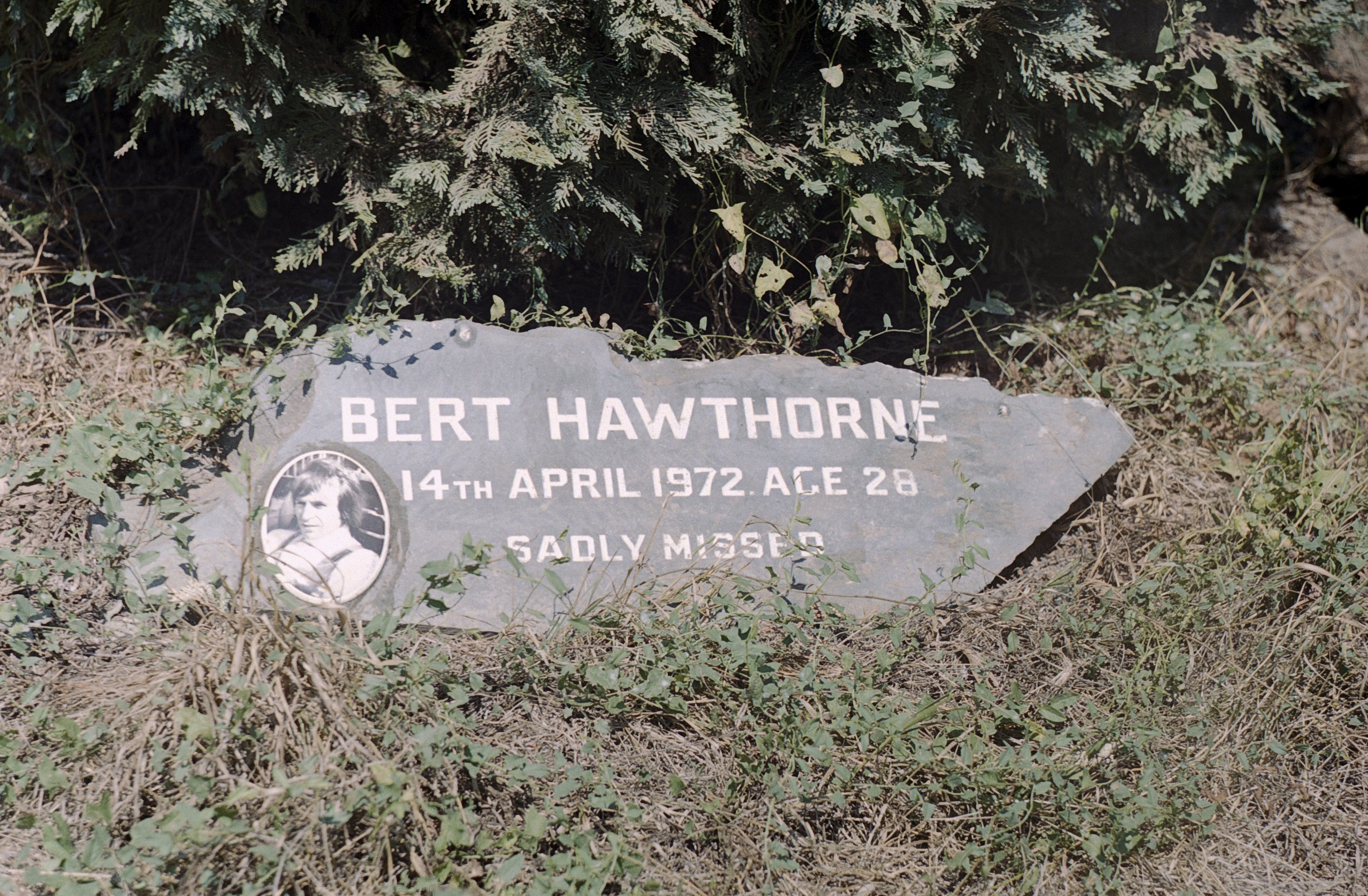
A memorial plate on the place of Bert Hawthorne's death

Hawthorne was killed on 14 April 1972, during practice for the following round of the European Championship, the Jim Clark Memorial Race at the Hockenheimring. Hawthorne was driving Allan McCall's TUI car on the first fast forest straight towards Ostkurve when the car slowed due to a mechanical failure. He signalled German driver Bernd Terbeck to pass when the rear axle on the TUI car locked up and Terbeck hit Hawthorne's car at speed, pitching it head-on against the barriers. The car skidded along the guard-rail, pulling out security uprights and came to rest on fire. At the track, it was realised that both Terbeck, who slid along the left side guardrail, and Hawthorne were missing, but there was no knowledge of the incident until two laps later, when Niki Lauda pulled into the pits and asked why nothing was being done about a car on fire on the circuit. It was later confirmed that Hawthorne had died instantly from head injuries.

At the time of his death, Hawthorne resided in Upper Saddle River, New Jersey.
