= 1974 Brazilian Grand Prix =

- Interlagos circuit

Race details
- Date: 27 January 1974
- Location: São Paulo, Brazil
- Course: Permanent racing facility
- Course length: 7.960 km (4.946 miles)
- Distance: 32 laps, 254.720 km (158.276 miles)
- Scheduled distance: 40 laps, 318.400 km (197.845 miles)
- Weather: Hot and partially cloudy in the first phase, then seasonal monsoon later.

Pole position
Driver	(Brazil) Emerson Fittipaldi	McLaren-Ford
- Time: 2:32.97

Fastest lap
Driver	(Switzerland) Clay Regazzoni	Ferrari
- Time: 2:36.05 on lap 26

Podium
First	(Brazil) Emerson Fittipaldi	McLaren-Ford
Second	(Switzerland) Clay Regazzoni	Ferrari
Third	(Belgium) Jacky Ickx	Lotus-Ford

The 1974 Brazilian Grand Prix was a Formula One motor race held at Interlagos on 27 January 1974. It was race 2 of 15 in both the 1974 World Championship of Drivers and the 1974 International Cup for Formula One Manufacturers. The 32-lap race was won by McLaren driver Emerson Fittipaldi after he started from pole position. Clay Regazzoni finished second for the Ferrari team and Lotus driver Jacky Ickx finished in third place.

== Qualifying ==
=== Qualifying classification ===
Pos.	Driver	Constructor	Time	No
1	(Brazil) Emerson Fittipaldi	McLaren-Ford	2:32.97	1
2	(Argentina) Carlos Reutemann	Brabham-Ford	2:33.21	2
3	(Austria) Niki Lauda	Ferrari	2:33.77	3
4	(Sweden) Ronnie Peterson	Lotus-Ford	2:33.82	4
5	(Belgium) Jacky Ickx	Lotus-Ford	2:34.64	5
6	(United States) Peter Revson	Shadow-Ford	2:34.66	6
7	(United Kingdom) Mike Hailwood	McLaren-Ford	2:34.95	7
8	(Switzerland) Clay Regazzoni	Ferrari	2:35.05	8
9	(Italy) Arturo Merzario	Iso-Marlboro-Ford	2:35.15	9
10	(Germany) Jochen Mass	Surtees-Ford	2:35.43	10
11	(New Zealand) Denny Hulme	McLaren-Ford	2:35.54	11
12	(Brazil) Carlos Pace	Surtees-Ford	2:35.63	12
13	(Germany) Hans Joachim Stuck	March-Ford	2:35.64	13
14	(South Africa) Jody Scheckter	Tyrrell-Ford	2:35.78	14
15	(United Kingdom) John Watson	Brabham-Ford	2:36.06	15
16	(France) Patrick Depailler	Tyrrell-Ford	2:36.21	16
17	(France) Jean-Pierre Beltoise	BRM	2:36.49	17
18	(United Kingdom) James Hunt	March-Ford	2:37.24	18
19	(France) Jean-Pierre Jarier	Shadow-Ford	2:37.63	19
20	(New Zealand) Howden Ganley	March-Ford	2:37.65	20
21	(United Kingdom) Graham Hill	Lola-Ford	2:38.62	21
22	(France) Henri Pescarolo	BRM	2:38.80	22
23	(France) François Migault	BRM	2:39.20	23
24	(United Kingdom) Richard Robarts	Brabham-Ford	2:39.85	24
25	(United Kingdom) Guy Edwards	Lola-Ford	2:42.15	25

== Race ==
=== Race summary ===
Emerson Fittipaldi took pole position for his home race from Carlos Reutemann. The start of the race was delayed as the track had to be swept clear of broken glass from over-exuberant spectators' celebrations and then Arturo Merzario's engine failed. When it did start, the flag caught some of the field unawares. Reutemann and Ronnie Peterson took advantage of the confusion to sweep into the lead, but by lap 4, Reutemann's tyres were going off. The race developed into a classic duel between Fittipaldi and Peterson, the Brazilian taking the lead on lap 16 and the Swede soon having to pit with a puncture (believed to be caused by some glass still left on the track).

Fittipaldi thus led Clay Regazzoni and Jacky Ickx until on lap 31 the heavens opened. With the track awash and the conditions dangerous, the race was red-flagged after 32 of the scheduled 40 laps. It was McLaren's second win of the year, but it was Ferrari who, with Regazzoni, topped the drivers' table - for the first time since March 1971.

=== Classification ===
Pos	No	Driver	Constructor	Laps	Time/Retired	Grid	Points
1	5	(Brazil) Emerson Fittipaldi	McLaren-Ford	32	1:24:37.06	1	9
2	11	(Switzerland) Clay Regazzoni	Ferrari	32	+ 13.57	8	6
3	2	(Belgium) Jacky Ickx	Lotus-Ford	31	+ 1 Lap	5	4
4	18	(Brazil) Carlos Pace	Surtees-Ford	31	+ 1 Lap	12	3
5	33	(United Kingdom) Mike Hailwood	McLaren-Ford	31	+ 1 Lap	7	2
6	1	(Sweden) Ronnie Peterson	Lotus-Ford	31	+ 1 Lap	4	1
7	7	(Argentina) Carlos Reutemann	Brabham-Ford	31	+ 1 Lap	2	
8	4	(France) Patrick Depailler	Tyrrell-Ford	31	+ 1 Lap	16	
9	24	(United Kingdom) James Hunt	March-Ford	31	+ 1 Lap	18	
10	14	(France) Jean-Pierre Beltoise	BRM	31	+ 1 Lap	17	
11	26	(United Kingdom) Graham Hill	Lola-Ford	31	+ 1 Lap	21	
12	6	(New Zealand) Denny Hulme	McLaren-Ford	31	+ 1 Lap	11	
13	3	(South Africa) Jody Scheckter	Tyrrell-Ford	31	+ 1 Lap	14	
14	15	(France) Henri Pescarolo	BRM	30	+ 2 Laps	22	
15	8	(United Kingdom) Richard Robarts	Brabham-Ford	30	+ 2 Laps	24	
16	37	(France) François Migault	BRM	30	+ 2 Laps	23	
17	19	(Germany) Jochen Mass	Surtees-Ford	30	+ 2 Laps	10	
Ret	28	(United Kingdom) John Watson	Brabham-Ford	27	Clutch	15	
Ret	9	(Germany) Hans Joachim Stuck	March-Ford	24	Transmission	13	
Ret	17	(France) Jean-Pierre Jarier	Shadow-Ford	21	Brakes	19	
Ret	20	(Italy) Arturo Merzario	Iso-Marlboro-Ford	20	Throttle	9	
Ret	16	(United States) Peter Revson	Shadow-Ford	10	Overheating	6	
Ret	10	(New Zealand) Howden Ganley	March-Ford	8	Ignition	20	
Ret	12	(Austria) Niki Lauda	Ferrari	2	Engine	3	
Ret	27	(United Kingdom) Guy Edwards	Lola-Ford	2	Chassis	25	

== Notes ==
- This was the 5th pole position and the 10th Grand Prix win for a Brazilian driver.
- This was the 10th Grand Prix win for McLaren.
- This was the 59th fastest lap set by a Ferrari-powered car, breaking the previous record by Ford at the 1973 United States Grand Prix.

== Championship standings after the race ==
Drivers' Championship standings

	Pos	Driver	Points
2	1	(Switzerland) Clay Regazzoni	10
8	2	(Brazil) Emerson Fittipaldi	9
2	3	(New Zealand) Denny Hulme	9
2	4	(Austria) Niki Lauda	6
1	5	(United Kingdom) Mike Hailwood	5

Constructors' Championship standings

	Pos	Constructor	Points
	1	(United Kingdom) McLaren-Ford	18
	2	(Italy) Ferrari	12
2	3	(United Kingdom) Lotus-Ford	4
7	4	(United Kingdom) Surtees-Ford	3
2	5	(United Kingdom) BRM	2

- Note: Only the top five positions are included for both sets of standings.

Previous race: 1974 Argentine Grand Prix	FIA Formula One World Championship; 1974 season	Next race: 1974 South African Grand Prix
Previous race: 1973 Brazilian Grand Prix	Brazilian Grand Prix	Next race: 1975 Brazilian Grand Prix
