= Bob Evans (racing driver) =

British racing driver (born 1947)

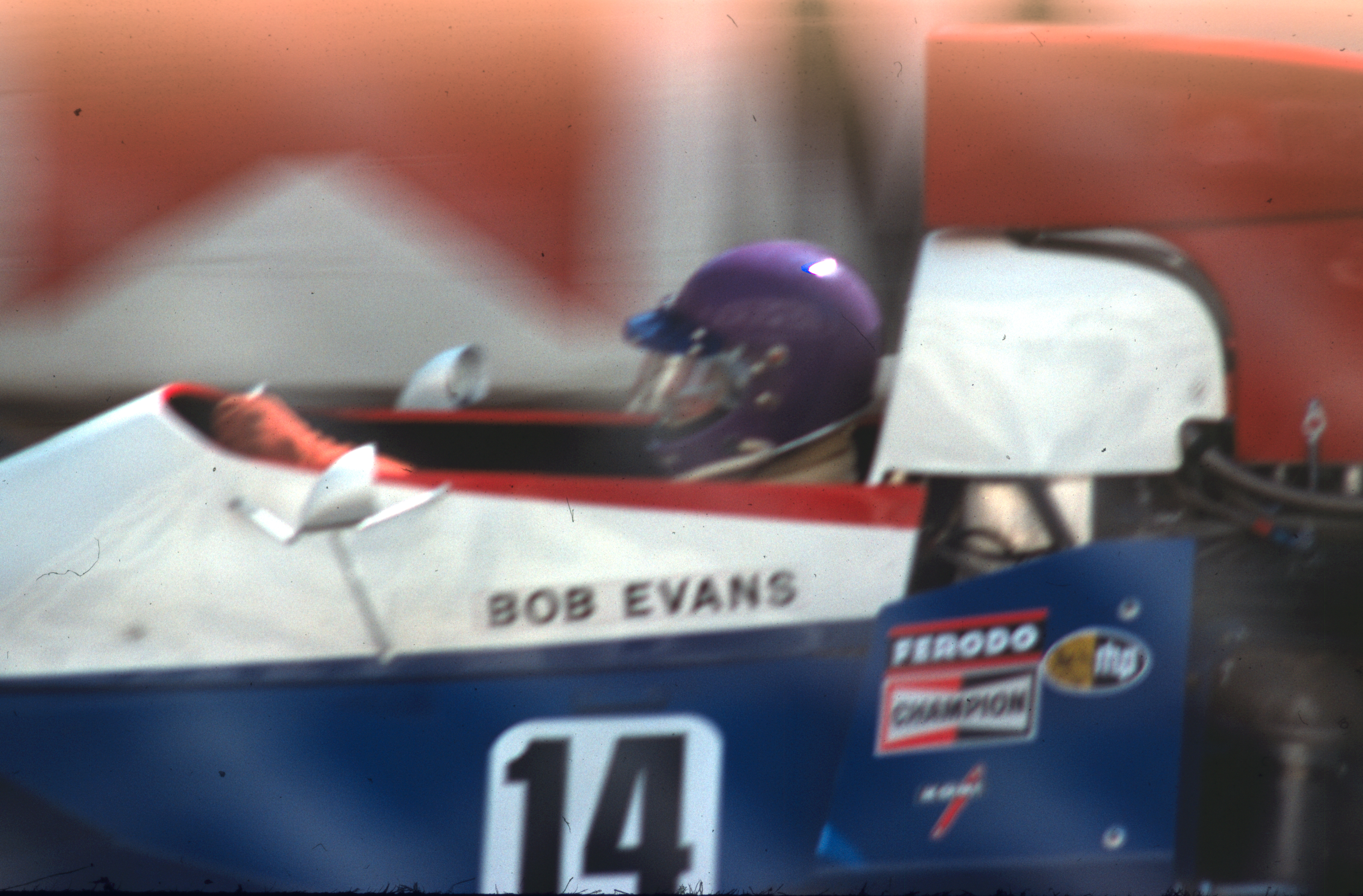
- Born: 11 June 1947 (age 79); Waddington, Lincolnshire, England

Formula One World Championship career
- Nationality: (United Kingdom) British
- Active years: 1975 - 1976
- Team(s): BRM, Lotus, RAM
- Entries: 12 (10 starts)
- Championships: 0
- Wins: 0
- Podiums: 0
- Career points: 0
- Pole positions: 0
- Fastest laps: 0
- First entry: 1975 South African Grand Prix
- Last entry: 1976 British Grand Prix

British Formula One Championship career
- Active years: 1978
- Entries: 8
- Championships: 0
- Wins: 1
- Podiums: 5
- Career points: 93
- Pole positions: 0
- Fastest laps: 0

Robert Neville Anthony Evans (born 11 June 1947) is a British former racing driver from England. He participated in 12 World Championship Formula One Grands Prix, debuting on 1 March 1975. He scored no championship points, and also competed in numerous non-championship races.

Evans followed the usual route through to Formula One, via Formula Ford, Formula 3 and Formula 5000, winning the 1974 Rothmans 5000 European Championship. After a season with the struggling BRM team in 1975, Evans tested and occasionally raced for Lotus the following year. He subsequently drove a Brabham for RAM in the 1976 British Grand Prix, before he moved to the Aurora F1 Championship in the late 1970s.

== Racing record ==
=== Complete European F5000 Championship results ===
(key) (Races in bold indicate pole position; races in italics indicate fastest lap.)

| Year | Entrant | Chassis | Engine | 1 | 2 | 3 | 4 | 5 | 6 | 7 | 8 | 9 | 10 | 11 | 12 | 13 | 14 | 15 | 16 | 17 | 18 | Pos. | Pts |
|---|---|---|---|---|---|---|---|---|---|---|---|---|---|---|---|---|---|---|---|---|---|---|---|
| 1973 | McKechnie Racing Organisation | Trojan T101 | Chevrolet 5.0 V8 | BRH; Ret | MAL; Ret | SIL; 13 | SNE; Ret | BRH | OUL; 4 | MAL; 4 | MIS; C | MAL; Ret | MON; 5 | SIL; C | BRH; DNS | OUL; 4 | JYL; Ret | ZAN; Ret | SNE; 1 | BRH; 8 | | 9th | 64 |
| 1974 | McKechnie Racing Organisation | Lola T332 | Chevrolet 5.0 V8 | BRH; DNS | MAL; 3 | SIL; 8 | OUL; 6 | BRH; 1 | ZOL; 2 | THR; 3 | ZAN; 2 | MUG; 2 | MNZ; 3 | MAL; 1 | **MON**; 1 | THR; 1 | **BRH**; 3 | **OUL**; 6 | **SNE**; 9 | MAL; 5 | **BRH**; Ret | 1st | 193 (198) |
| 1975 | Theodore Racing | Lola T332 | Chevrolet 5.0 V8 | BRH | OUL | BRH | SIL | ZOL | ZAN | THR | SNE; 1 | MAL; Ret | THR | BRH | OUL | | | | | | | 7th | 64 |
| 1975 | Reed Racing | Lola T332 | Chevrolet 5.0 V8 | | | | | | | | | | | | | SIL; 4 | SNE | | | | | 7th | 64 |
| 1975 | McKechnie Racing Organisation | Lola T400 | Chevrolet 5.0 V8 | | | | | | | | | | | | | | | MAL; 4 | BRH; 3 | | | 7th | 64 |

=== Complete World Sportscar Championship results ===
(key)

| Year | Entrant | Class | Chassis | Engine | 1 | 2 | 3 | 4 | 5 | 6 | 7 | 8 | 9 | 10 | 11 | 12 | 13 | 14 | 15 | Pos. | Pts |
|---|---|---|---|---|---|---|---|---|---|---|---|---|---|---|---|---|---|---|---|---|---|
| 1974 | Argyle Engineering with M. Coombe Racing | S 3.0 | March 74S | Ford Cosworth DFV 3.0 V8 | MNZ | SPA | NÜR | IMO | LMS | ÖST | GLN | LEC | BRH; 8 | KYA | | | | | | (Note: No drivers' Championship.) | |
| 1980 | Dome Co. Ltd. | S +2.0 | Dome RL80 | Ford Cosworth DFV 3.0 V8 | DAY | BRH | MUG | MNZ | SIL | NÜR | LMS; 25 | GLN | MOS | VAL | DIJ | | | | | | |
| 1981 | Dome Co. Ltd. | S +2.0 | Dome RL81 | Ford Cosworth DFV 3.0 V8 | DAY | SEB | MUG | MNZ | RSD | SIL | NÜR | LMS; Ret | PER | DAY | GLN | SPA | MOS | ROA | BRH | NC | 0 |
| 1982 | Nimrod Racing Automobiles Ltd. | C | Nimrod NRA/C2 | Aston Martin-Tickford DP1229 5.3 V8 | MNZ | SIL; Ret | NÜR | LMS; Ret | SPA | MUG | FUJ | BRH | | | | | | | | NC | 0 |
| 1984 | Gebhardt Motorsport | C2 | Gebhardt JC842 | BMW M12 2.0 L4 | MNZ | SIL; Ret | LMS | NÜR | BRH | MOS | SPA | IMO | FUJ | KYA | SAN | | | | | NC | 0 |
| 1985 | EMKA Productions Ltd. | C1 | EMKA C84/1 | Aston Martin-Tickford DP1229 5.3 V8 | MUG | MNZ | SIL; Ret | LMS | HOC | MOS | SPA | BRH | FUJ | SHA | | | | | | NC | 0 |

Footnotes

=== Complete Formula One World Championship results ===
(key)

| Year | Entrant | Chassis | Engine | 1 | 2 | 3 | 4 | 5 | 6 | 7 | 8 | 9 | 10 | 11 | 12 | 13 | 14 | 15 | 16 | WDC | Pts |
|---|---|---|---|---|---|---|---|---|---|---|---|---|---|---|---|---|---|---|---|---|---|
| 1975 | Stanley BRM | BRM P201 | BRM P200 3.0 V12 | ARG | BRA | RSA; 15 | ESP; Ret | MON; DNQ | BEL; 9 | SWE; 13 | NED; Ret | FRA; 17 | GBR | GER | AUT; Ret | ITA; Ret | USA | | | NC | 0 |
| 1976 | John Player Team Lotus | Lotus 77 | Ford Cosworth DFV 3.0 V8 | BRA | RSA; 10 | USW; DNQ | ESP | BEL | MON | SWE | FRA | | | | | | | | | NC | 0 |
| 1976 | RAM Racing | Brabham BT44B | Ford Cosworth DFV 3.0 V8 | | | | | | | | | GBR; Ret | GER | AUT | NED | ITA | CAN | USA | JPN | NC | 0 |

=== Complete Formula One non-championship results ===
(key)

| Year | Entrant | Chassis | Engine | 1 | 2 | 3 |
|---|---|---|---|---|---|---|
| 1973 | McKechnie Racing Organisation | Trojan T101 (F5000) | Chevrolet 5.0 V8 | ROC; DNS | INT; Ret | |
| 1974 | McKechnie Racing Organisation | Lola T332 (F5000) | Chevrolet 5.0 V8 | PRE | ROC | INT; DNS |
| 1975 | Stanley BRM | BRM P201 | BRM P200 3.0 V12 | ROC; 6 | INT; 10 | SUI |
| 1976 | John Player Team Lotus | Lotus 77 | Ford Cosworth DFV 3.0 V8 | ROC; 9 | INT | |
| 1977 | Hexagon Racing | Penske PC3 | Ford Cosworth DFV 3.0 V8 | ROC; 11 | | |

=== Complete Shellsport International Series results ===
(key)

| Year | Entrant | Chassis | Engine | 1 | 2 | 3 | 4 | 5 | 6 | 7 | 8 | 9 | 10 | 11 | 12 | 13 | 14 | Pos. | Pts |
|---|---|---|---|---|---|---|---|---|---|---|---|---|---|---|---|---|---|---|---|
| 1976 | David Hepworth | McLaren M25 | Chevrolet 5.0 V8 | MAL | SNE | OUL | BRH | THR | BRH | MAL | SNE | BRH; 2 | THR; Ret | OUL | BRH | BRH | | 21st | 15 |
| 1977 | Charles Clowes Racing | Chevron B30 | Ford GAA 3.4 V6 | MAL | SNE | OUL | BRH | MAL | THR | BRH; DNS | OUL | MAL | DON | BRH | THR | SNE | BRH | NC | 0 |

=== Complete European Formula Two Championship results ===
(key)

| Year | Entrant | Chassis | Engine | 1 | 2 | 3 | 4 | 5 | 6 | 7 | 8 | 9 | 10 | 11 | 12 | 13 | Pos. | Pts |
|---|---|---|---|---|---|---|---|---|---|---|---|---|---|---|---|---|---|---|
| 1977 | Wheatcroft Racing | Pilbeam R27 | Hart | SIL; Ret | THR; Ret | HOC | NÜR | VAL | PAU | MUG | ROU | NOG | PER | MIS | EST | DON | NC | 0 |

=== Complete British Formula One Championship results ===
(key) (Races in bold indicate pole position; races in italics indicate fastest lap.)

| Year | Entrant | Chassis | Engine | 1 | 2 | 3 | 4 | 5 | 6 | 7 | 8 | 9 | 10 | 11 | 12 | Pos. | Pts |
|---|---|---|---|---|---|---|---|---|---|---|---|---|---|---|---|---|---|
| 1978 | J. C. Cooper | Surtees TS19 | Ford Cosworth DFV 3.0 V8 | OUL | BRH | SNE | MAL | ZAN; 1 | DON; 3 | | | | | | | 2nd | 93 |
| 1978 | J. C. Cooper | Hesketh 308E | Ford Cosworth DFV 3.0 V8 | | | | | | | THR; 2 | OUL; 5 | MAL; 7 | BRH; 2 | THR; 2 | SNE; 7 | 2nd | 93 |

=== 24 Hours of Le Mans results ===
| Year | Team | Co-Drivers | Car | Class | Laps | Pos. | Class Pos. |
|---|---|---|---|---|---|---|---|
| 1978 | (United Kingdom) Dorset Racing Associates | (Republic of Ireland) Martin Birrane (United Kingdom) Richard Down | Lola T294S-Ford Cosworth | S 2.0 | 23 | DNF | DNF |
| 1979 | (Japan) Dome Co. Ltd. | (United Kingdom) Tony Trimmer | Dome Zero RL-Ford Cosworth | S +2.0 | 25 | DNF | DNF |
| 1980 | (Japan) Dome Co. Ltd. | (United Kingdom) Chris Craft | Dome RL80-Ford Cosworth | S +2.0 | 246 | 25th | 4th |
| 1981 | (Japan) Dome Co. Ltd. | (United Kingdom) Chris Craft | Dome RL81-Ford Cosworth | S +2.0 | 154 | DNF | DNF |
| 1982 | (United Kingdom) Nimrod Racing Automobiles Ltd. | (United Kingdom) Tiff Needell (United Kingdom) Geoff Lees | Nimrod NRA/C2-Aston Martin | C | 55 | DNF | DNF |

Sporting positions
| Preceded by Teddy Pilette | European F5000 Championship; Champion; 1974 | Succeeded by Teddy Pilette |
