= 1979 British Formula One Championship =

Seasons
- ← 1978 1980 →

The 1979 British Formula One Championship (formally the 1979 Aurora AFX F1 Championship) was the second season of the British Formula One Championship. It commenced on 1 April 1979 and ended on 7 October after fifteen races. The Drivers' Championship was won by Englishman Rupert Keegan who drove an Arrows A1 entered by Charles Clowes.

== Teams and drivers ==
Entry List
Team	No.	Driver	Chassis	Engine	Rounds
Formula 1
(United Kingdom) Melchester Racing	1	(South Africa) Desiré Wilson	Tyrrell 008	Ford Cosworth DFV 3.0 V8	All
(United Kingdom) Melchester Racing	2	(United States) Gordon Smiley	Tyrrell 008	Ford Cosworth DFV 3.0 V8	1-4
(United Kingdom) Melchester Racing	2	(United Kingdom) Neil Bettridge	Tyrrell 008	Ford Cosworth DFV 3.0 V8	8-13
(United Kingdom) Melchester Racing	2	(United States) Gordon Smiley	McLaren M23	Ford Cosworth DFV 3.0 V8	5-7
(United Kingdom) Melchester Racing	2	(United Kingdom) Neil Bettridge	Arrows A1	Ford Cosworth DFV 3.0 V8	14-15
(Spain) Madom F1 Team	3	(Spain) Emilio de Villota	Lotus 78	Ford Cosworth DFV 3.0 V8	All
(United Kingdom) Mopar Ultramar Racing Team	4	(United Kingdom) Guy Edwards	Fittipaldi F5A	Ford Cosworth DFV 3.0 V8	All
(United Kingdom) Mopar Ultramar Racing Team	5	(Belgium) Bernard de Dryver	Fittipaldi F5A	Ford Cosworth DFV 3.0 V8	All
(United Kingdom) Graham Eden Racing	6	(United Kingdom) Tiff Needell	Chevron B41	Ford Cosworth DFV 3.0 V8	1-4, 7, 11, 15
(United Kingdom) Graham Eden Racing	6	(United Kingdom) Ray Mallock	Chevron B41	Ford Cosworth DFV 3.0 V8	5
(United Kingdom) Graham Eden Racing	6	(United Kingdom) David Leslie	Chevron B41	Ford Cosworth DFV 3.0 V8	8-9, 11-12
(United Kingdom) Graham Eden Racing	6	(United Kingdom) Kim Mather	Chevron B41	Ford Cosworth DFV 3.0 V8	13-14
(United Kingdom) Valentino Musetti	7	(United Kingdom) Valentino Musetti	March 752/771	Ford Cosworth DFV 3.0 V8	1
(United Kingdom) Valentino Musetti	7	(United Kingdom) Valentino Musetti	March 781	Ford Cosworth DFV 3.0 V8	2-5
(United Kingdom) John Cooper	8	(United Kingdom) John Cooper	Ensign N177	Ford Cosworth DFV 3.0 V8	5-8
(United Kingdom) John Cooper	8	(United Kingdom) Tiff Needell	Ensign N177	Ford Cosworth DFV 3.0 V8	10
(Italy) Team Agostini Marlboro	9	(Italy) Giacomo Agostini	Williams FW06	Ford Cosworth DFV 3.0 V8	All
(Italy) Team Agostini Marlboro	10	(Italy) Gimax	Williams FW06	Ford Cosworth DFV 3.0 V8	4, 6, 10-11
(Italy) Team Agostini Marlboro	10	(Italy) Marco Micangeli	Williams FW06	Ford Cosworth DFV 3.0 V8	12, 14
(Italy) Team Agostini Marlboro	10	(Italy) Guido Pardini	Williams FW06	Ford Cosworth DFV 3.0 V8	13
(Italy) Team Agostini Marlboro	44	(Italy) Lella Lombardi	Williams FW06	Ford Cosworth DFV 3.0 V8	4
(Hong Kong) Theodore Racing with Hi-Line	11	(Republic of Ireland) David Kennedy	Wolf WR4	Ford Cosworth DFV 3.0 V8	1-11
(Hong Kong) Theodore Racing with Hi-Line	11	(Republic of Ireland) David Kennedy	Wolf WR6	Ford Cosworth DFV 3.0 V8	12-15
(Hong Kong) Theodore Racing with Hi-Line	7	(United Kingdom) Valentino Musetti	Wolf WR3	Ford Cosworth DFV 3.0 V8	8-9
(Hong Kong) Theodore Racing with Hi-Line	7	(United Kingdom) Valentino Musetti	Wolf WR4	Ford Cosworth DFV 3.0 V8	12
(Hong Kong) Theodore Racing with Hi-Line	12	(United Kingdom) Geoff Lees	Wolf WR4	Ford Cosworth DFV 3.0 V8	15
(United Kingdom) Frank Williams Racing	14	(Italy) Giorgio Pianta	Williams FW06	Ford Cosworth DFV 3.0 V8	10
(United Kingdom) C. W. Clowes Racing	16	(United Kingdom) Rupert Keegan	Arrows A1	Ford Cosworth DFV 3.0 V8	2-9, 11-15
(United Kingdom) C. W. Clowes Racing	17	(Argentina) Ricardo Zunino	Arrows A1	Ford Cosworth DFV 3.0 V8	8-14
(United Kingdom) BS Fabrications	17	(Argentina) Ricardo Zunino	McLaren M23	Ford Cosworth DFV 3.0 V8	6
(United Kingdom) BS Fabrications	17	(Argentina) Ricardo Zunino	Arrows A1	Ford Cosworth DFV 3.0 V8	7
(United Kingdom) Team Surtees	22	(United Kingdom) Philip Bullman	Surtees TS20	Ford Cosworth DFV 3.0 V8	1-3
(United Kingdom) Team Surtees	22	(United States) Gordon Smiley	Surtees TS20	Ford Cosworth DFV 3.0 V8	9-10, 12
(United Kingdom) Team Surtees	22	(United States) Gordon Smiley	Surtees TS20+	Ford Cosworth DFV 3.0 V8	13-15
(United Kingdom) Team Surtees	23	(Belgium) Claude Bourgoignie	Surtees TS20	Ford Cosworth DFV 3.0 V8	1
(United Kingdom) Team Surtees	23	(France) Jean-Pierre Jaussaud	Surtees TS20	Ford Cosworth DFV 3.0 V8	10
(United Kingdom) Dennis Leech	24	(United Kingdom) Dennis Leech	McLaren M23	Ford Cosworth DFV 3.0 V8	13
(United Kingdom) LEC Refrigeration Racing	27	(United Kingdom) David Purley	LEC CRP1	Ford Cosworth DFV 3.0 V8	12-13
(United Kingdom) LEC Refrigeration Racing	27	(United Kingdom) David Purley	Shadow DN9	Ford Cosworth DFV 3.0 V8	14-15
(United Kingdom) Smith & Jones	33	(United Kingdom) Robin Smith	Ensign N174	Ford Cosworth DFV 3.0 V8	1, 3
(United Kingdom) Smith & Jones	33	(United Kingdom) Richard Jones	Ensign N174	Ford Cosworth DFV 3.0 V8	2, 5
(United Kingdom) Smith & Jones	33	(United Kingdom) Robin Smith	Surtees TS19	Ford Cosworth DFV 3.0 V8	7, 9, 12, 14
(United Kingdom) Smith & Jones	33	(United Kingdom) Richard Jones	Surtees TS19	Ford Cosworth DFV 3.0 V8	8, 11, 15
(West Germany) Willi Kauhsen	39	(Italy) Gianfranco Brancatelli	Kauhsen WK	Ford Cosworth DFV 3.0 V8	1
(West Germany) Walz Toj Racing	42	(Austria) Gerd Biechteler	March 781	Ford Cosworth DFV 3.0 V8	1-3
(United Kingdom) Iain McLaren	88	(United Kingdom) Iain McLaren	McLaren M26	Ford Cosworth DFV 3.0 V8	2, 4, 8
Formula 2
(United Kingdom) Cooper Industries	8	(United Kingdom) John Cooper	March 792	Hart 420R 2.0 L4	1-2, 4, 13
(United Kingdom) Divina Galica	13	(United Kingdom) Divina Galica	March 792	Hart 420R 2.0 L4	2, 8
(United Kingdom) Pontin Racing	15	(United Kingdom) Kim Mather	March 772P	Hart 420R 2.0 L4	1
(United Kingdom) Pontin Racing	15	(United Kingdom) Kim Mather	March 772P	BMW M12 2.0 L4	2, 4-9
(United Kingdom) Pontin Racing	15	(United Kingdom) Kim Mather	March 772P/782	Ford BDG Eden 2.0 L4	11
(United Kingdom) Pontin Racing	15	(United Kingdom) Mike Wilds	March 772P/782	Ford BDG Eden 2.0 L4	13
(United Kingdom) Pontin Racing	15	(United Kingdom) Kim Mather	March 772P/782	Ford BDG Richardson 2.0 L4	15
(United Kingdom) A. G. Dean Racing	18	(United Kingdom) Tony Dean	Chevron B42	Hart 420R 2.0 L4	1-2, 4-5, 8-10
(United Kingdom) A. G. Dean Racing	19	(United Kingdom) Brian Robinson	Chevron B42	Hart 420R 2.0 L4	1-2, 4-5, 7-9, 11-14
(United Kingdom) A. G. Dean Racing	19	(United Kingdom) Brian Robinson	Chevron B48	Hart 420R 2.0 L4	15
(United Kingdom) Adrian Russell	20	(United Kingdom) Adrian Russell	March 782	Hart 420R 2.0 L4	1, 4-8, 10
(United Kingdom) RAM Racing	25	(Belgium) Germain Garon	Chevron B42	Hart 420R 2.0 L4	1-2, 10
(United Kingdom) RAM Racing	25	(Belgium) Hervé Regout	Chevron B42	Hart 420R 2.0 L4	4-9, 11-15
(United Kingdom) Onyx Race Engineering	26	(Belgium) Patrick Nève	Pilbeam MP42	Hart 420R 2.0 L4	5-6
(United Kingdom) Onyx Race Engineering	26	(United Kingdom) Neil Bettridge	Pilbeam MP42	Hart 420R 2.0 L4	7
(United Kingdom) Kenneth Brill	28	(United Kingdom) Kenneth Brill	Chevron B35D	Ford BDG 2.0 L4	2, 4, 6-8, 11
(United Kingdom) Warren Booth	29	(United Kingdom) Warren Booth	Chevron B42	Hart 420R 2.0 L4	2, 4, 6, 8-9
(United Kingdom) Dicksons of Perth	30	(United Kingdom) Norman Dickson	March 792	Hart 420R 2.0 L4	1-2, 4-9, 11-13, 15
(United Kingdom) Dicksons of Perth	31	(Italy) Gianfranco Brancatelli	March 772P	Hart 420R 2.0 L4	5
(United Kingdom) Dicksons of Perth	34	(Belgium) Pascal Witmeur	March 772P	Hart 420R 2.0 L4	1
(France) Ecurie Motul Nogaro	34	(France) Alain Couderc	AGS JH15	BMW M12 2.0 L4	10
(West Germany) Walz Toj Racing	65	(West Germany) Klaus Walz	March 782	BMW M12 2.0 L4	1-2
(Hong Kong) Team BP with Theodore Racing	77	(United Kingdom) Derek Warwick	March 792	Hart 420R 2.0 L4	4, 13-14

== Results and standings ==
=== Races ===
Rnd	Track	Date	Laps	Pole position	Fastest lap	Race winner	Constructor
1	Zolder	1 April	40	(Republic of Ireland) David Kennedy	(South Africa) Desiré Wilson	(Republic of Ireland) David Kennedy	Wolf
2	Oulton Park	13 April	65	(United Kingdom) Guy Edwards	(Republic of Ireland) David Kennedy	(Republic of Ireland) David Kennedy	Wolf
3	Brands Hatch	15 April	39	(United Kingdom) Rupert Keegan	(United Kingdom) Rupert Keegan	(United Kingdom) Guy Edwards	Fittipaldi
4	Mallory Park	7 May	75	(Belgium) Bernard de Dryver	(United Kingdom) Guy Edwards	(United Kingdom) Rupert Keegan	Arrows
5	Snetterton	20 May	53	(United Kingdom) Guy Edwards	(United Kingdom) Rupert Keegan	(United Kingdom) Rupert Keegan	Arrows
6	Thruxton	28 May	50	(United Kingdom) Guy Edwards	(Republic of Ireland) David Kennedy	(Spain) Emilio de Villota	Lotus
7	Zandvoort	4 June	40	(United Kingdom) Guy Edwards	(Spain) Emilio de Villota	(Spain) Emilio de Villota	Lotus
8	Donington Park	24 June	52	(United Kingdom) Rupert Keegan	(Argentina) Ricardo Zunino	(United Kingdom) Rupert Keegan	Arrows
9	Oulton Park	30 June	65	(United Kingdom) Guy Edwards	(Spain) Emilio de Villota	(Spain) Emilio de Villota	Lotus
10	Nogaro	8 July	50	(Argentina) Ricardo Zunino	(Argentina) Ricardo Zunino	(Spain) Emilio de Villota	Lotus
11	Mallory Park	29 July	75	(Spain) Emilio de Villota	(Argentina) Ricardo Zunino	(Republic of Ireland) David Kennedy	Wolf
12	Brands Hatch	27 August	40	(United Kingdom) Rupert Keegan	(United Kingdom) Guy Edwards	(Argentina) Ricardo Zunino	Arrows
13	Thruxton	9 September	50	(Argentina) Ricardo Zunino	(Spain) Emilio de Villota	(United Kingdom) Rupert Keegan	Arrows
14	Snetterton	23 September	55	(United Kingdom) Rupert Keegan	(United Kingdom) Rupert Keegan	(United Kingdom) Rupert Keegan	Arrows
15	Silverstone	7 October	35	(United Kingdom) Rupert Keegan	(United Kingdom) Rupert Keegan	(United States) Gordon Smiley	Surtees

=== Drivers' standings ===
Points are awarded to the top ten classified finishers using the following structure:

Position	**1st**	**2nd**	**3rd**	**4th**	**5th**	**6th**	**PP**	**FL**
Points	9	6	4	3	2	1	2	1

Pos.	Driver	ZOL (Belgium)	OUL (United Kingdom)	BRH (United Kingdom)	MAL (United Kingdom)	SNE (United Kingdom)	THR (United Kingdom)	ZAN (Netherlands)	DON (United Kingdom)	OUL (United Kingdom)	NOG (France)	MAL (United Kingdom)	BRH (United Kingdom)	THR (United Kingdom)	SNE (United Kingdom)	SIL (United Kingdom)	Pts
1	(United Kingdom) Rupert Keegan		11	**Ret**	1	1	Ret	NC	**1**	Ret		Ret	**DNS**	1	**1**	**2**	65
2	(Republic of Ireland) David Kennedy	**1**	1	DNS	3	NC	2	2	10	Ret	3	1	3	3	3	Ret	63
3	(Spain) Emilio de Villota	Ret	7	Ret	4	3	1	1	2	1	1	**6**	Ret	Ret	8	Ret	55
4	(Belgium) Bernard de Dryver	5	Ret	2	**Ret**	4	DNS	6	3	2	2	Ret	4	4	5	4	41
5	(United Kingdom) Guy Edwards	DSQ	**2**	1	5	**Ret**	**Ret**	**7**	6	**Ret**	Ret	3	2	Ret	Ret	8	40
6	(Argentina) Ricardo Zunino						5	Ret	4	Ret	**7**	2	1	**2**	2		39
7	(South Africa) Desiré Wilson	3	3	3	11	Ret	3	4	Ret	5	4	Ret	7	7	6	5	28
8	(Italy) Giacomo Agostini	9	6	5	Ret	2	6	3	9	3	Ret	Ret	Ret	6	7	7	19
9	(United States) Gordon Smiley	DNS	9	4	Ret	7	4	5		10	DNS		6	Ret	Ret	1	18
10	(United Kingdom) Tiff Needell	2	10	Ret	7			8			Ret	Ret				6	7
11	(United Kingdom) Norman Dickson	6	4		6	6	DNS	10	7	Ret		NC	Ret	14		10	6
=	(United Kingdom) Derek Warwick				2									13	Ret		6
13	(United Kingdom) Philip Bullman	4	5	Ret													5
14	(United Kingdom) Kim Mather	7	8		Ret	10	8	NC	8	6		4		DNS	Ret	Ret	4
=	(United Kingdom) Neil Bettridge							Ret	12	Ret	Ret	Ret	5	5	Ret	12	4
=	(United Kingdom) Geoff Lees															3	4
17	(United Kingdom) David Leslie								14	4		DNS	Ret				3
=	(United Kingdom) David Purley												Ret	10	4	9	3
19	(United Kingdom) John Cooper	DNS	Ret		10	5	7	9	DSQ					11			2
=	(United Kingdom) Divina Galica		Ret						5								2
=	(Italy) Gimax				Ret		9				Ret	5					2
=	(Italy) Giorgio Pianta										5						2
23	(United Kingdom) Tony Dean	12	NC		9				11	Ret	6						1
=	(United Kingdom) Valentino Musetti	Ret	Ret	6	NC	Ret			13	DNS			NC				1
—	(United Kingdom) Robin Smith	11		7				11		8			8		Ret		0
—	(United Kingdom) Brian Robinson	13	12		12	9		13	Ret	7		NC	9	Ret	9	11	0
—	(United Kingdom) Richard Jones		Ret			DNS			Ret			7				13	0
—	(Belgium) Hervé Regout				8	DNS	Ret	12	Ret	11		NC	Ret	Ret	Ret	Ret	0
—	(United Kingdom) Adrian Russell	Ret			DNQ	8	Ret	14	Ret		Ret						0
—	(Belgium) Germain Garon	14	Ret								8						0
—	(Germany) Klaus Walz	8	NC														0
—	(Italy) Guido Pardini													8			0
—	(United Kingdom) Warren Booth		13		13		10		15	9							0
—	(United Kingdom) Dennis Leech													9			0
—	(Austria) Gerd Biechteler	10	DNS	DNQ													0
—	(United Kingdom) Mike Wilds													12			0
—	(Italy) Lella Lombardi				14												0
—	(United Kingdom) Kenneth Brill		DNQ		DNQ		NC	Ret	DNS			DNS					0
—	(Belgium) Patrick Nève					Ret	NC										0
—	(Italy) Gianfranco Brancatelli	Ret				Ret											0
—	(Italy) Marco Micangeli												Ret		Ret		0
—	(Belgium) Pascal Witmeur	Ret															0
—	(Belgium) Claude Bourgoignie	Ret															0
—	(United Kingdom) Ray Mallock					Ret											0
—	(France) Alain Couderc										Ret						0
—	(France) Jean-Pierre Jaussaud										Ret						0
—	(United Kingdom) Iain McLaren		DNS		DNQ				DNS								0
Pos.	Driver	ZOL (Belgium)	OUL (United Kingdom)	BRH (United Kingdom)	MAL (United Kingdom)	SNE (United Kingdom)	THR (United Kingdom)	ZAN (Netherlands)	DON (United Kingdom)	OUL (United Kingdom)	NOG (France)	MAL (United Kingdom)	BRH (United Kingdom)	THR (United Kingdom)	SNE (United Kingdom)	SIL (United Kingdom)	Pts

Colour	Result
Gold	Winner
Silver	Second place
Bronze	Third place
Green	Points classification
Blue	Non-points classification
Blue	Non-classified finish (NC)
Purple	Retired, not classified (Ret)
Red	Did not qualify (DNQ)
Red	Did not pre-qualify (DNPQ)
Black	Disqualified (DSQ)
White	Did not start (DNS)
White	Withdrew (WD)
White	Race cancelled (C)
Blank	Did not practice (DNP)
Blank	Did not arrive (DNA)
Blank	Excluded (EX)

**Bold** – Pole
Italics – Fastest Lap
