= 1978 British Formula One Championship =

Formula One Championship

Seasons
- ← 1977 1979 →

The 1978 British Formula One Championship (formally the 1978 Aurora AFX F1 Championship) was the first season of the British Formula One Championship. It commenced on 24 March 1978 and ended on 24 September after twelve races.

The Aurora AFX F1 Championship replaced the Shellsport Group 8 series that had been run in 1976 and 1977 to Formula Libre rules. As part of the changes, Formula 5000 and Formula Atlantic cars were no longer eligible to race in the Aurora AFX championship. Formula 1 cars were now the focus of the series, with Formula 2 cars still being permitted as a 'B-class'.

== Teams and drivers ==
Entry List
| Team | No. | Driver | Chassis | Engine | Rounds |
Formula 1
| (United Kingdom) Melchester Racing | 1 | (United Kingdom) Tony Trimmer | McLaren M23 | Ford Cosworth DFV 3.0 V8 | 1–5, 7, 9–10, 12 |
| (United Kingdom) Melchester Racing | 1 | (United Kingdom) Divina Galica | McLaren M23 | Ford Cosworth DFV 3.0 V8 | 11 |
| (United Kingdom) Team March | 3 | (Australia) Bruce Allison | March 75A/761 | Ford Cosworth DFV 3.0 V8 | 4-8 |
| (United Kingdom) Team March | 4 | (United Kingdom) Guy Edwards | March 75A/761 | Ford Cosworth DFV 3.0 V8 | 1-2 |
| (United Kingdom) Team March | 3 | (Australia) Bruce Allison | March 781 | Ford Cosworth DFV 3.0 V8 | 9-12 |
| (United Kingdom) Team March | 4 | (United Kingdom) Guy Edwards | March 781 | Ford Cosworth DFV 3.0 V8 | 3-12 |
| (United Kingdom) Team March | 21 | (United Kingdom) Geoff Lees | March 781 | Ford Cosworth DFV 3.0 V8 | 7 |
| (Spain) Centro Asegurador F1 | 5 | (Spain) Emilio de Villota | McLaren M25 | Ford Cosworth DFV 3.0 V8 | 1–6, 10-12 |
| (Spain) Centro Asegurador F1 | 5 | (Spain) Emilio de Villota | McLaren M23 | Ford Cosworth DFV 3.0 V8 | 8-9 |
| (United Kingdom) Valentino Musetti | 7 | (United Kingdom) Valentino Musetti | March 752/761 | Ford Cosworth DFV 3.0 V8 | 1-9 |
| (United Kingdom) Mario Deliotti Racing | 7 | (United Kingdom) Valentino Musetti | Ensign N177 | Ford Cosworth DFV 3.0 V8 | 10-12 |
| (United Kingdom) Mario Deliotti Racing | 9 | (United Kingdom) Geoff Lees | Ensign N175 | Ford Cosworth DFV 3.0 V8 | 1-4 |
| (United Kingdom) Mario Deliotti Racing | 9 | (Australia) Bruce Allison | Ensign N175 | Ford Cosworth DFV 3.0 V8 | 2 |
| (United Kingdom) Mario Deliotti Racing | 9 | (Italy) Giancarlo Martini | Ensign N175 | Ford Cosworth DFV 3.0 V8 | 5-6 |
| (United Kingdom) Mario Deliotti Racing | 9 | (United Kingdom) Ray Mallock | Ensign N175 | Ford Cosworth DFV 3.0 V8 | 7 |
| (United Kingdom) Mario Deliotti Racing | 9 | (South Africa) Desiré Wilson | Ensign N175 | Ford Cosworth DFV 3.0 V8 | 8-12 |
| (Republic of Ireland) Alo Lawler | 10 | (Republic of Ireland) Alo Lawler | Surtees TS19 | Ford Cosworth DFV 3.0 V8 | 1-3 |
| (United Kingdom) Stanley BRM | 11 | (Belgium) Teddy Pilette | BRM P207 | BRM P202 3.0 V12 | 1–4, 7-12 |
| (United Kingdom) Team Olympus | 13 | (United Kingdom) Divina Galica | Surtees TS19 | Ford Cosworth DFV 3.0 V8 | 5 |
| (United Kingdom) J. C. Cooper | 14 | (United Kingdom) Bob Evans | Surtees TS19 | Ford Cosworth DFV 3.0 V8 | 5-6 |
| (United Kingdom) J. C. Cooper | 14 | (United Kingdom) Bob Evans | Hesketh 308E | Ford Cosworth DFV 3.0 V8 | 7-12 |
| (United Kingdom) J. C. Cooper | 17 | (United Kingdom) John Cooper | Hesketh 308C | Ford Cosworth DFV 3.0 V8 | 1-8 |
| (United Kingdom) J. C. Cooper | 17 | (United Kingdom) John Cooper | Hesketh 308E | Ford Cosworth DFV 3.0 V8 | 9, 11-12 |
| (United Kingdom) J. C. Cooper | 17 | (United Kingdom) Geoff Lees | Hesketh 308E | Ford Cosworth DFV 3.0 V8 | 10 |
| (United Kingdom) Dennis Leech | 16 | (United Kingdom) Dennis Leech | March 761 | Ford Cosworth DFV 3.0 V8 | 11 |
| (West Germany) Jörg Zaborowski | 19 | (West Germany) Jörg Zaborowski | March 761 | Ford Cosworth DFV 3.0 V8 | 3 |
| (United Kingdom) BS Fabrications | 30 | (United States) Brett Lunger | McLaren M26 | Ford Cosworth DFV 3.0 V8 | 5 |
| (United Kingdom) Theodore Racing | 32 | (Republic of Ireland) David Kennedy | Wolf WR3 | Ford Cosworth DFV 3.0 V8 | 12 |
| (Austria) Gerd Biechteler | 65 | (Austria) Gerd Biechteler | March 761 | Ford Cosworth DFV 3.0 V8 | 4, 6 |
Formula 2
| (United Kingdom) Graham Eden Racing | 6 | (United Kingdom) Mike Wilds | Ralt RT1 | Ford BDG 2.0 L4 | All |
| (United Kingdom) Mario Deliotti Racing | 9 | (United Kingdom) Geoff Lees | Chevron B42 | Hart 420R 2.0 L4 | 11 |
| (Republic of Ireland) L & B Excavations | 10 | (Republic of Ireland) Alo Lawler | Ralt RT1 | Hart 420R 2.0 L4 | 6, 8, 11 |
| (United Kingdom) Stephen South | 12 | (United Kingdom) Stephen South | March 782 | Hart 420R 2.0 L4 | 10-11 |
| (United Kingdom) Kim Mather | 15 | (United Kingdom) Kim Mather | Chevron B35D | Ford BDG 2.0 L4 | 1–9, 12 |
| (United States) Fred Opert Racing | 16 | (Netherlands) Boy Hayje | Chevron B42 | Hart 420R 2.0 L4 | 5 |
| (United Kingdom) Chevron Cars | 16 | (Italy) Elio de Angelis | Chevron B42 | Hart 420R 2.0 L4 | 10 |
| (United Kingdom) MacLaren's of Broxburn | 18 | (United Kingdom) Iain McLaren | Chevron B35 | Ford BDX 2.0 L4 | 1, 4 |
| (United Kingdom) MacLaren's of Broxburn | 18 | (United Kingdom) Iain McLaren | Chevron B40 | Hart 420R 2.0 L4 | 9 |
| (United Kingdom) Adrian Russell | 20 | (United Kingdom) Adrian Russell | March 762 | Ford BDX 2.0 L4 | 1-11 |
| (United Kingdom) Boxer Cars | 22 | (United Kingdom) Norman Dickson | Boxer PR276 | Hart 420R 2.0 L4 | 3, 5 |
| (United Kingdom) Boxer Cars | 22 | (Australia) Geoff Brabham | Boxer PR276 | Hart 420R 2.0 L4 | 6 |
| (United Kingdom) Boxer Cars | 22 | (Spain) Emilio de Villota | Boxer PR276 | Hart 420R 2.0 L4 | 7 |
| (United Kingdom) Andy Barton | 23 | (United Kingdom) Andy Barton | Barton JTB3 | Ford BDX 2.0 L4 | 4 |
| (United Kingdom) Andy Barton | 23 | (United Kingdom) Andy Barton | March 77B/772P | Ford BDG 2.0 L4 | 9 |
| (United Kingdom) Warren Booth | 29 | (United Kingdom) Warren Booth | Scott F2 | Ford BDX 2.0 L4 | 1, 6, 8 |
| (United Kingdom) Nigel Clarkson | 30 | (United Kingdom) Nigel Clarkson | March 742 | Ford BDX 2.0 L4 | 1–2, 12 |
| (United Kingdom) Alan Baillie | 38 | (United Kingdom) Alan Baillie | March 752 | Ford BDX Swindon 2.0 L4 | 1, 4, 6–7, 11-12 |
| (United Kingdom) Alan Baillie | 38 | (United Kingdom) Ray Mallock | March 752 | Ford BDX Swindon 2.0 L4 | 9 |
| (United Kingdom) Kevin Bowditch | 41 | (United Kingdom) Kevin Bowditch | Lola T460 | Ford 2.0 L4 | 6-7 |
| (Italy) Carlo Giorgio | 42 | (Italy) Carlo Giorgio | March 742 | Hart 420R 2.0 L4 | 2, 5 |
| (Austria) Dr. Joseph Ehrlich | 43 | (New Zealand) Brett Riley | March 762 | Hart 420R 2.0 L4 | 9-10 |
| (United Kingdom) Dicksons of Perth | 47 | (United Kingdom) Norman Dickson | March 772P | Hart 420R 2.0 L4 | 10-11 |
| (West Germany) Eugen Grupp | 64 | (West Germany) Eugen Grupp | Toj F202 | BMW M12 2.0 L4 | 9 |
| (Austria) Osterreich ASC | 65 | (Austria) Gerd Biechteler | March 782 | BMW M12 2.0 L4 | 9 |
| (United States) Briggs Racing Enterprises | 71 | (United States) John David Briggs | Chevron B42 | Hart 420R 2.0 L4 | 10-11 |
| (United States) Briggs Racing Enterprises | 77 | (United States) Don Breidenbach | Chevron B42 | Hart 420R 2.0 L4 | 10-11 |
| (Austria) Walter Raus | 78 | (Austria) Walter Raus | March 762 | BMW M12 2.0 L4 | 2 |
| (United Kingdom) Smith and Jones | 90 | (United Kingdom) Richard Jones | March 742 | Ford BDG 2.0 L4 | 10-12 |
| (United Kingdom) Bill Wood | ? | (United Kingdom) Bill Wood | March 742 | Ford 2.0 L4 | 5 |

== Results and standings ==
=== Races ===
| Rnd | Track | Date | Laps | Pole position | Fastest lap | Race winner | Constructor |
|---|---|---|---|---|---|---|---|
| 1 | Oulton Park | 24 March | 65 | (United Kingdom) Tony Trimmer | (United Kingdom) Tony Trimmer | (United Kingdom) Tony Trimmer | McLaren |
| 2 | Brands Hatch | 27 March | 40 | (United Kingdom) Guy Edwards | (United Kingdom) Geoff Lees | (United Kingdom) Tony Trimmer | McLaren |
| 3 | Snetterton | 16 April | 55 | (United Kingdom) Tony Trimmer | (United Kingdom) Tony Trimmer | (United Kingdom) Tony Trimmer | McLaren |
| 4 | Mallory Park | 1 May | 75 | (United Kingdom) Tony Trimmer | (Spain) Emilio de Villota | (United Kingdom) Geoff Lees | Ensign |
| 5 | Zandvoort | 15 May | 38 | (United States) Brett Lunger | (United States) Brett Lunger | (United Kingdom) Bob Evans | Surtees |
| 6 | Donington Park | 21 May | 55 | (Italy) Giancarlo Martini | (Italy) Giancarlo Martini | (Italy) Giancarlo Martini | Ensign |
| 7 | Thruxton | 29 May | 50 | (United Kingdom) Guy Edwards | (United Kingdom) Geoff Lees | (United Kingdom) Tony Trimmer | McLaren |
| 8 | Oulton Park | 24 June | 65 | (Spain) Emilio de Villota | (Belgium) Teddy Pilette | (United Kingdom) Guy Edwards | March |
| 9 | Mallory Park | 30 July | 75 | (United Kingdom) Tony Trimmer | (Spain) Emilio de Villota | (Australia) Bruce Allison | March |
| 10 | Brands Hatch | 28 August | 40 | (United Kingdom) Stephen South | (Spain) Emilio de Villota | (United Kingdom) Tony Trimmer | McLaren |
| 11 | Thruxton | 10 September | 45 | (Spain) Emilio de Villota | (United Kingdom) Geoff Lees | (United Kingdom) Guy Edwards | March |
| 12 | Snetterton | 24 September | 50 | (Spain) Emilio de Villota | (Republic of Ireland) David Kennedy | (Republic of Ireland) David Kennedy | Wolf |

=== Drivers' standings ===
Points are awarded to the top ten classified finishers using the following structure:

| Position | **1st** | **2nd** | **3rd** | **4th** | **5th** | **6th** | **7th** | **8th** | **9th** | **10th** | **FL** |
| Points | 20 | 15 | 12 | 10 | 8 | 6 | 4 | 3 | 2 | 1 | 2 |

| Pos. | Driver | OUL (United Kingdom) | BRH (United Kingdom) | SNE (United Kingdom) | MAL (United Kingdom) | ZAN (Netherlands) | DON (United Kingdom) | THR (United Kingdom) | OUL (United Kingdom) | MAL (United Kingdom) | BRH (United Kingdom) | THR (United Kingdom) | SNE (United Kingdom) | Pts |
|---|---|---|---|---|---|---|---|---|---|---|---|---|---|---|
| 1 | (United Kingdom) Tony Trimmer | **1** | 1 | **1** | **2** | DNS | | 1 | | **2** | 1 | | 2 | 149 |
| 2 | (United Kingdom) Bob Evans | | | | | 1 | 3 | 2 | 5 | 7 | 2 | 2 | 7 | 93 |
| 3 | (Spain) Emilio de Villota | 2 | 3 | 2 | 4 | Ret | 5 | 7 | **Ret** | 4 | Ret | **8** | **8** | 86 |
| 4 | (United Kingdom) Guy Edwards | Ret | **4** | Ret | 10 | Ret | 2 | **Ret** | 1 | 3 | DNS | 1 | Ret | 78 |
| 5 | (United Kingdom) Geoff Lees | Ret | 2 | 3 | 1 | | | Ret | | | 5 | 5 | | 69 |
| 6 | (Australia) Bruce Allison | | DNS | | 6 | Ret | Ret | 4 | 2 | 1 | Ret | 12 | 3 | 63 |
| 7 | (United Kingdom) Valentino Musetti | NC | NC | Ret | 3 | 7 | 4 | 5 | 3 | Ret | 6 | 4 | DNS | 62 |
| 8 | (United Kingdom) John Cooper | 3 | 8 | Ret | 8 | 8 | 7 | 8 | 7 | 9 | | 10 | 4 | 44 |
| 9 | (United Kingdom) Mike Wilds | Ret | 6 | Ret | 7 | 6 | DNS | 6 | 6 | 8 | 7 | 13 | 5 | 43 |
| 10 | (South Africa) Desiré Wilson | | | | | | | | Ret | 6 | 4 | 3 | 6 | 34 |
| 11 | (Italy) Giancarlo Martini | | | | | 4 | **1** | | | | | | | 32 |
| 12 | (Republic of Ireland) David Kennedy | | | | | | | | | | | | 1 | 22 |
| 13 | (Belgium) Teddy Pilette | Ret | 5 | Ret | Ret | | | Ret | 4 | Ret | Ret | Ret | Ret | 20 |
| 14 | (United Kingdom) Divina Galica | | | | | 2 | | | | | | 7 | | 19 |
| 15 | (United Kingdom) Kim Mather | 4 | Ret | NC | 5 | NC | Ret | DNS | NC | Ret | | | Ret | 18 |
| 16 | (Netherlands) Boy Hayje | | | | | 3 | | | | | | | | 12 |
| = | (United Kingdom) Ray Mallock | | | | | | | 3 | | 12 | | | | 12 |
| = | (Italy) Elio de Angelis | | | | | | | | | | 3 | | | 12 |
| 19 | (United Kingdom) Iain McLaren | 5 | | | 9 | | | | | 10 | | | | 11 |
| = | (United Kingdom) Adrian Russell | DNQ | 10 | NC | 13 | 9 | 8 | 9 | 8 | NC | Ret | Ret | | 11 |
| 21 | (United States) Brett Lunger | | | | | **5** | | | | | | | | 10 |
| 22 | (New Zealand) Brett Riley | | | | | | | | | 5 | Ret | | | 8 |
| 23 | (United States) Don Breidenbach | | | | | | | | | | 10 | 6 | | 7 |
| 24 | (Australia) Geoff Brabham | | | | | | 6 | | | | | | | 6 |
| 25 | (Austria) Walter Raus | | 7 | | | | | | | | | | | 4 |
| 26 | (United States) John David Briggs | | | | | | | | | | 8 | 17 | | 3 |
| 27 | (United Kingdom) Stephen South | | | | | | | | | | **Ret** | 9 | | 2 |
| = | (United Kingdom) Warren Booth | NC | | | | | 9 | | Ret | | | | | 2 |
| = | (Italy) Carlo Giorgio | | 9 | | | Ret | | | | | | | | 2 |
| = | (United Kingdom) Richard Jones | | | | | | | | | | 9 | 11 | Ret | 2 |
| — | (United Kingdom) Andy Barton | | | | 12 | | | | | 11 | | | | 0 |
| — | (Austria) Gerd Biechteler | | | | 11 | | DNS | | | 13 | | | | 0 |
| — | (United Kingdom) Alan Baillie | DNQ | | | 14 | | NC | NC | | | | 15 | DNS | 0 |
| — | (United Kingdom) Norman Dickson | | | DNS | | Ret | | | | | DNS | 14 | | 0 |
| — | (United Kingdom) Dennis Leech | | | | | | | | | | | 16 | | 0 |
| — | (Republic of Ireland) Alo Lawler | Ret | Ret | DNS | | | Ret | | Ret | | | Ret | | 0 |
| — | (United Kingdom) Bill Wood | | | | | Ret | | | | | | | | 0 |
| — | (United Kingdom) Kevin Bowditch | | | | | | DNQ | DNS | | | | | | 0 |
| — | (United Kingdom) Nigel Clarkson | DNQ | DNQ | | | | | | | | | | DNQ | 0 |
| — | (West Germany) Jörg Zaborowski | | | DNQ | | | | | | | | | | 0 |
| — | (West Germany) Eugen Grupp | | | | | | | | | DNQ | | | | 0 |
| Pos. | Driver | OUL (United Kingdom) | BRH (United Kingdom) | SNE (United Kingdom) | MAL (United Kingdom) | ZAN (Netherlands) | DON (United Kingdom) | THR (United Kingdom) | OUL (United Kingdom) | MAL (United Kingdom) | BRH (United Kingdom) | THR (United Kingdom) | SNE (United Kingdom) | Pts |

| Colour | Result |
|---|---|
| Gold | Winner |
| Silver | Second place |
| Bronze | Third place |
| Green | Points classification |
| Blue | Non-points classification |
| Blue | Non-classified finish (NC) |
| Purple | Retired, not classified (Ret) |
| Red | Did not qualify (DNQ) |
| Red | Did not pre-qualify (DNPQ) |
| Black | Disqualified (DSQ) |
| White | Did not start (DNS) |
| White | Withdrew (WD) |
| White | Race cancelled (C) |
| Blank | Did not practice (DNP) |
| Blank | Did not arrive (DNA) |
| Blank | Excluded (EX) |

**Bold** – Pole
Italics – Fastest Lap
