= Guy Edwards =

British racing driver (1942–2026)

Guy Edwards QGM
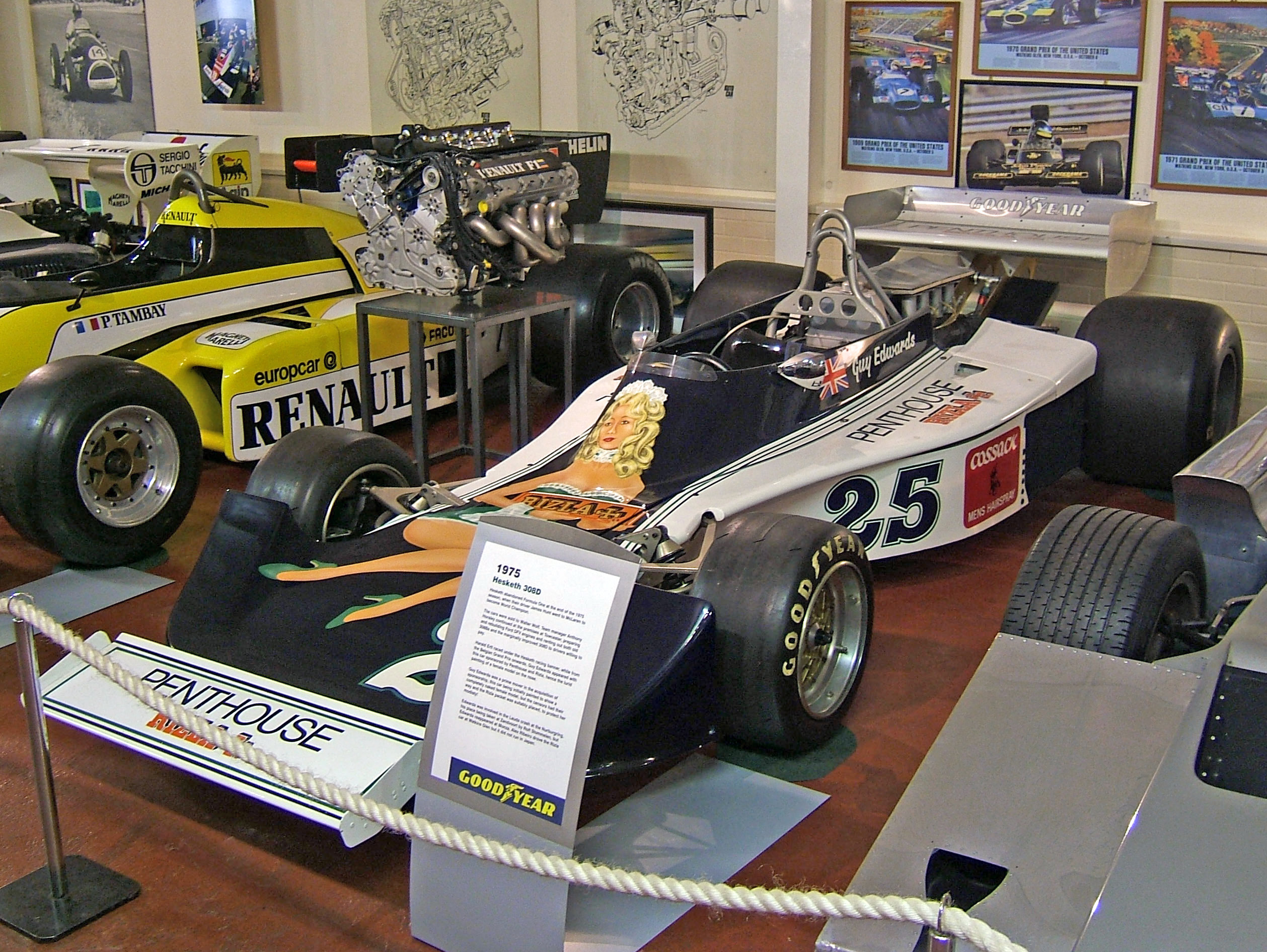
- Guy Edwards's Hesketh 308D of 1976, in the Penthouse Rizla Racing livery which Edwards brought to the team
- Born: Guy Richard Goronwy Edwards; 30 December 1942; Macclesfield, Cheshire, England
- Died: 19 June 2026 (aged 83); Connemara, County Galway, Ireland

Formula One World Championship career
- Nationality: (United Kingdom) British
- Active years: 1974, 1976 – 1977
- Team(s): Hill, Hesketh, BRM
- Entries: 17 (11 starts)
- Championships: 0
- Wins: 0
- Podiums: 0
- Career points: 0
- Pole positions: 0
- Fastest laps: 0
- First entry: 1974 Argentine Grand Prix
- Last entry: 1977 British Grand Prix

Guy Richard Goronwy Edwards, QGM (30 December 1942 – 19 June 2026) was a British racing driver. Best known for his sportscar and British Formula One career, as well as for brokering sponsorship deals, Edwards participated in 17 World Championship Formula One Grands Prix, debuting on 13 January 1974. He scored no championship points.

== Early life ==
Edwards attended Liverpool College and studied at Durham University (University College), graduating in 1964.

With aspirations of racing cars, Edwards went straight from university to Brands Hatch Racing School and persuaded the owner to allow him to perform secretarial work in exchange for ten free laps a week in circuit cars. After saving up money he was able to purchase a Mini Cooper-S, with which he gained his first competitive experience. Edwards upgraded to a Chevron B8 once he gained sponsorship and soon entered Formula 5000.

== Career ==
Edwards competed in the Aurora Formula One Championship in the UK from 1978 to 1980, scoring several wins driving March, Fittipaldi and Arrows chassis. In 1979, he scored the only race win for a Fittipaldi Formula One chassis.

Edwards was also renowned for being one of the drivers, along with Arturo Merzario, Brett Lunger and Harald Ertl, who saved Niki Lauda from his burning car during the 1976 German Grand Prix, for which he was later awarded a Queen's Gallantry Medal for his bravery. After retiring from Formula One, he worked helping racing drivers to get sponsorship.

== Personal life and death ==
Edwards' son Sean, also a racing driver, was killed in a motor racing accident at Queensland Raceway in Australia on 15 October 2013. He was sitting as a passenger in a Porsche 911 GT3 to coach a younger driver when they had a high-speed crash and subsequently caught fire.

In October 2018, media erroneously reported Edwards dead.

Edwards died in Connemara, County Galway, Ireland on 19 June 2026, aged 83.

== Racing record ==
=== Complete World Endurance Championship results ===
(key) (Races in bold indicate pole position) (Races in italics indicate fastest lap)

Year	Entrant	Class	Chassis	Engine	1	2	3	4	5	6	7	8	9	10	11	12	13	14	15	Pos.	Pts
1966	Roy Johnson	P 1.0	Marcos Mini GT	BMC 1.0 L4	SEB	TAR	NÜR	MUG; NC	PER	CRM	NÜR	ÖST								(Note: No drivers' Championship.)	
1967	Guy Edwards	P 1.3	Marcos Mini GT	BMC 1.3 L4	NÜR; 23	HOC	MUG; Ret	PER	ÖST	VSO	NÜR										
1969	Guy Edwards	S 2.0	Chevron B8	BMW 2.0 L4	DAY	SEB	BRH	MNZ	TAR	SPA; 15	NÜR	LMS	GLN								
1969	Tor-Line Racing	S 2.0	Chevron B8	BMW 2.0 L4										ÖST; Ret							
1970	Philips Autoradio Racing	P 2.0	Astra RNR2	Ford Cosworth FVC 1.8 L4	DAY	SEB	BRH	MNZ	TAR	SPA; Ret	NÜR; Ret	LMS	GLN	ÖST							
1971	Guy Edwards	P 2.0	Lola T212	Ford Cosworth FVA 1.6 L4	BUE	DAY	SEB	BRH	MNZ; DNQ	SPA	TAR	NÜR; Ret		ÖST; Ret	GLN						
1971	Camel Filters Team Huron	P 2.0	Lola T212	Ford Cosworth FVC 1.8 L4									LMS; Ret								
1972	Barclays International Racing	S 2.0	Lola T290	Ford Cosworth FVC 1.9 L4	BUE	DAY	SEB	BRH; 7	MNZ	SPA	TAR										
1972	Barclays International Racing	S 2.0	Lola T290	Chevrolet 2.0 L4								NÜR; 32	LMS	ÖST							
1973	Barclays International Team Lola	S 2.0	Lola T292	Ford Cosworth FVC 1.9 L4	DAY	VAL	DIJ; Ret	MNZ	SPA	TAR	NÜR	LMS	ÖST	GLN							
1975	Cheetah Automobiles	S 2.0	Cheetah G501	Ford Cosworth BDG 2.0 L4	DAY	MUG	DIJ; DNQ	MNZ	SPA	PER	NÜR	ÖST	GLN								
1976	The Ultramar March	S 3.0	March 76S	Ford Cosworth DFV 3.0 V8	NÜR; Ret															(Note: In 1976 and 1977 the World Championship was divided into two series that ran simultaneously but separately: The World Sportscar Championship and the World Championship for Makes.)	
1976	Guy Edwards	S 3.0	March 76S	Ford Cosworth DFV 3.0 V8		MNZ; Ret	IMO	PER	MOS											(Note: In 1976 and 1977 the World Championship was divided into two series that ran simultaneously but separately: The World Sportscar Championship and the World Championship for Makes.)	
1976	Guy Edwards	S 2.0	March 76S	Hart 420R 2.0 L4						DIJ; 12	SAL									(Note: In 1976 and 1977 the World Championship was divided into two series that ran simultaneously but separately: The World Sportscar Championship and the World Championship for Makes.)	
1977	Dorset Racing	S 2.0	Lola T294S	Ford Cosworth FVC 2.0 L4	DIJ; DNS	MNZ	VAL	PER	EST	LEC											
1977	Guy Edwards	S 2.0	Lola T296	Ford Cosworth BDG 2.0 L4							IMO; Ret	SAL; 4									
1979	March Racing	S +2.0	BMW M1	BMW M88 3.5 L6	DAY	MUG	DIJ	SIL	NÜR	PER	GLN	BRH; Ret	VAL								
1980	Porsche Kremer Racing	Gr.5	Porsche 935 K3/80	Porsche 930/80 3.2 F6t	DAY	BRH	MUG	MNZ	SIL; Ret	NÜR											
1980	J.L.P. Racing	IMSA	Porsche 935 JLP-2	Porsche 3.0 F6t							LMS; 9	GLN	MOS	VAL	DIJ						
1981	Grid Team Lola	S +2.0	Lola T600	Cosworth DFL 3.3 V8	DAY	SEB	MUG	MNZ; Ret	RSD			LMS; 15								21st	53
1981	Banco Occidental Ultramar Team Lola	S +2.0	Lola T600	Ford Cosworth DFV 3.0 V8						SIL; Ret										21st	53
1981	Grid Team Lola	S +2.0	Lola T600	Ford Cosworth DFV 3.0 V8							NÜR; 8		PER; 1	DAY						21st	53
1981	Banco Occidental Ultramar Team Lola	S +2.0	Lola T600	Cosworth DFL 3.3 V8											GLN; Ret	SPA	MOS	ROA	BRH; 1	21st	53
1982	Ultramar Team Lola	C	Lola T610	Cosworth DFL 3.9 V8	MNZ; Ret	SIL; 16	NÜR; Ret	LMS; Ret	SPA; Ret	MUG	FUJ	BRH; 7								80th	4
1983	Henns' T-Bird Swap Shop	C	Porsche 956	Porsche Type 935/76 2.6 F6t	MNZ	SIL; Ret	NÜR													38th	8
1983	John Fitzpatrick Racing	C	Porsche 956	Porsche Type 935/76 2.6 F6t				LMS; 5	SPA	FUJ	KYA									38th	8
1984	Skoal Bandit Porsche Team	C1	Porsche 956	Porsche Type 935/76 2.6 F6t	MNZ; Ret	SIL; 3														40th	12
1984	Skoal Bandit Porsche Team	C1	Porsche 962	Porsche Type 935/76 2.6 F6t			LMS; Ret	NÜR; 11	BRH; 3	MOS	SPA	IMO	FUJ	KYA	SAN					40th	12
1985	John Fitzpatrick Racing	C1	Porsche 956	Porsche Type 935/76 2.6 F6t	MUG	MNZ	SIL; Ret													NC	0
1985	John Fitzpatrick Racing	C1	Porsche 956B	Porsche Type 935/79 2.6 F6t				LMS; 4	HOC	MOS	SPA	BRH	FUJ	SHA						NC	0

Footnotes

=== Complete 24 Hours of Le Mans results ===
Year	Team	Co-Drivers	Car	Class	Laps	Pos.	Class Pos.
1971	(United Kingdom) Camel Filters Team Huron	(United Kingdom) Roger Enever	Lola T212-Ford Cosworth	P 2.0		DNF	DNF
1977	(Germany) Porsche Kremer Racing	(United Kingdom) John Fitzpatrick (United Kingdom) Nick Faure	Porsche 935	Gr.5	15	DNF	DNF
1978	(United Kingdom) Ibec Racing Developments Hesketh Team	(United Kingdom) Ian Grob	Ibec P6-Ford Cosworth	S +2.0	195	DNF	DNF
1979	(United Kingdom) March Racing	(Austria) Dieter Quester (United Kingdom) Ian Grob	BMW M1	S +2.0	-	DNQ	DNQ
1980	(United States) J.L.P. Racing	(United States) John Paul Sr. (United States) John Paul Jr.	Porsche 935 JLP-2	IMSA	312	9th	**2nd**
1981	(United Kingdom) Team Lola	(Spain) Emilio de Villota (Spain) Juan Fernández	Lola T600-Ford Cosworth	S +2.0	287	15th	**3rd**
1982	(United Kingdom) Ultramar Team Lola	(United Kingdom) Rupert Keegan (United Kingdom) Nick Faure	Lola T610-Ford Cosworth	C	72	DNF	DNF
1983	(United Kingdom) John Fitzpatrick Racing	(United Kingdom) John Fitzpatrick (United Kingdom) Rupert Keegan	Porsche 956	C	358	5th	5th
1984	(United Kingdom) Skoal Bandit Porsche Team (United Kingdom) John Fitzpatrick Racing	(United Kingdom) Rupert Keegan (Brazil) Roberto Moreno	Porsche 962	C1	72	DNF	DNF
1985	(United Kingdom) John Fitzpatrick Racing	(Austria) Jo Gartner (United Kingdom) David Hobbs	Porsche 956B	C1	366	4th	4th

=== Complete European F5000 Championship results ===
(key) (Races in bold indicate pole position; races in italics indicate fastest lap.)

Year	Entrant	Chassis	Engine	1	2	3	4	5	6	7	8	9	10	11	12	13	14	15	16	17	18	Pos.	Pts
1971	JT Butterworth	McLaren M10B	Chevrolet 5.0 V8	MAL	SNE	BRH	MON	SIL	CAS	MAL	MNZ	MAL	THR	SIL	OUL	SNE	HOC	OUL	BRH	BRH; 10		NC	0
1972	John Butterworth	McLaren M10B	Chevrolet 5.0 V8	BRH; DNS	MAL	SNE	BRH; DNS	NIV	SIL	MON; 7	OUL; 6	MAL	BRH; Ret	SIL	BRH; 6	OUL; Ret	BRH; Ret					16th	2
1973	John Butterworth	Lola T330	Chevrolet 5.0 V8	BRH; Ret	MAL; Ret	SIL	SNE; 6	BRH; 13	OUL; DNS	MAL; 9	MIS; C	MAL; 4	MON; 2	SIL; C	BRH; 6	OUL; 10	JYL; 9	ZAN; 1	SNE; DNS	BRH; 1		5th	102
1974	Embassy Racing with John Butterworth	Lola T332	Chevrolet 5.0 V8	BRH; Ret	MAL; Ret	SIL; Ret	OUL; Ret	BRH	ZOL	THR; 10	ZAN; 3	MUG	MNZ; 7	MAL	MON	THR	BRH	OUL	SNE	MAL; 1	BRH; Ret	15th	37
1975	Guy Edwards	Lola T332	Chevrolet 5.0 V8	BRH; 7	OUL; 2	BRH; NC	SIL; 7	ZOL; Ret	ZAN; 9	THR; 3	SNE; 4	MAL; 2	THR; Ret	BRH; 3	OUL; 6	SIL; 3	SNE; 2	MAL; 2	BRH; Ret			3rd	122

=== Complete Formula One World Championship results ===
(key)

Year	Entrant	Chassis	Engine	1	2	3	4	5	6	7	8	9	10	11	12	13	14	15	16	17	WDC	Pts
1974	Embassy Racing With Graham Hill	Lola T370	Ford Cosworth DFV 3.0 V8	ARG; 11	BRA; Ret	RSA	ESP; DNQ	BEL; 12	MON; 8	SWE; 7	NED; Ret	FRA; 15	GBR; DNS	GER; DNQ	AUT	ITA	CAN	USA			NC	0
1976	Penthouse Rizla Racing	Hesketh 308D	Ford Cosworth DFV 3.0 V8	BRA	RSA	USW	ESP	BEL; DNQ	MON	SWE	FRA; 17	GBR; Ret	GER; 15	AUT	NED	ITA; DNS	CAN; 20	USA	JPN		NC	0
1977	Rotary Watches Stanley-BRM	BRM P207	BRM P202 3.0 V12	ARG	BRA	RSA	USW	ESP	MON	BEL	SWE	FRA	GBR; DNPQ	GER	AUT	NED	ITA	USA	CAN	JPN	NC	0

=== Complete Formula One non-championship results ===
(key)

Year	Entrant	Chassis	Engine	1	2	3	4	5	6	7	8
1971	JT Butterworth	McLaren M10B (F5000)	Chevrolet 5.0 V8	ARG	ROC	QUE	SPR	INT	RIN	OUL	VIC; 20
1972	John Butterworth	McLaren M10B (F5000)	Chevrolet 5.0 V8	ROC	BRA	INT	OUL; 7	REP	VIC; DNS		
1973	John Butterworth	Lola T330 (F5000)	Chevrolet 5.0 V8	ROC; Ret	INT						
1974	Embassy Racing with John Butterworth	Lola T332 (F5000)	Chevrolet 5.0 V8	PRE	ROC; DNS						
1974	Embassy Racing With Graham Hill	Lola T370	Ford Cosworth DFV 3.0 V8			INT; 9					
1975	Guy Edwards	Lola T332 (F5000)	Chevrolet 5.0 V8	ROC; DNQ	INT	SUI					
1976	Hesketh Racing	Hesketh 308D	Ford Cosworth DFV 3.0 V8	ROC	INT; Ret						
1979	RAM Racing	Fittipaldi F5A	Ford Cosworth DFV 3.0 V8	ROC; 7	GNM	DIN					

=== Complete Shellsport International Series results ===
(key) (Races in bold indicate pole position; races in italics indicate fastest lap)

Year	Entrant	Chassis	Engine	1	2	3	4	5	6	7	8	9	10	11	12	13	14	Pos.	Pts
1976	The Ultramar Ensign	Ensign N174	Ford Cosworth DFV 3.0 V8	MAL	SNE	OUL	BRH	THR	**BRH**; Ret	MAL	SNE	BRH	THR					9th	30
1976	RAM Racing	Brabham BT42	Ford Cosworth DFV 3.0 V8											**OUL**; 1	BRH; 5	BRH		9th	30
1977	RAM Racing	March 75A/761	Ford GAA 3.4 V6	MAL; NC	**SNE**; 1	**OUL**; Ret	BRH; 3	MAL; 5	THR; 2	BRH; 2	OUL; 2							2nd	129
1977	RAM Racing	March 75A/761	Ford Cosworth DFV 3.0 V8									MAL; Ret	DON; Ret	BRH; Ret	THR; 1	**SNE**; Ret	BRH; 1	2nd	129

=== Complete European Formula Two Championship results ===
(key)

Year	Entrant	Chassis	Engine	1	2	3	4	5	6	7	8	9	10	11	12	13	Pos.	Pts
1977	Ardmore Racing	Chevron B40	Hart	SIL	THR	HOC	NÜR; 13	VAL; DNQ	PAU	MUG	ROU	NOG	PER	MIS	EST	DON	NC	0

=== Complete British Formula One Championship results ===
(key) (Races in bold indicate pole position; races in italics indicate fastest lap)

Year	Entrant	Chassis	Engine	1	2	3	4	5	6	7	8	9	10	11	12	13	14	15	Pos.	Pts
1978	Team March	March 75A/761	Ford Cosworth DFV 3.0 V8	OUL; Ret	**BRH**; 4														4th	78
1978	Team March	March 781	Ford Cosworth DFV 3.0 V8			SNE; Ret	MAL; 10	ZAN; Ret	DON; 2	**THR**; Ret	OUL; 1	MAL; 3	BRH; DNS	THR; 1	SNE; Ret				4th	78
1979	RAM Racing	Fittipaldi F5A	Ford Cosworth DFV 3.0 V8	ZOL; DSQ	**OUL**; 2	BRH; 1	MAL; 5	**SNE**; Ret	**THR**; Ret	**ZAN**; 7	DON; 6	**OUL**; Ret	NOG; Ret	MAL; 3	BRH; 2	THR; Ret	SNE; Ret	SIL; 8	5th	40
1980	Charles Clowes Racing	Arrows A1	Ford Cosworth DFV 3.0 V8	OUL; 1	BRH; Ret	SIL; 4	MAL; Ret	THR; 3	MNZ; 2	MAL; 2	SNE; 1	BRH; 5	THR; Ret	OUL; 4	SIL; 2				3rd	51

=== Complete British Touring Car Championship results ===
(key) (Races in bold indicate pole position in class) (Races in italics indicate fastest lap in class – 1 point awarded all races)

Year	Team	Car	Class	1	2	3	4	5	6	7	8	9	10	11	12	13	DC	Pts	Class
1988	Kaliber Racing	Ford Sierra RS500	A	SIL	OUL	THR; Ret	DON ovr:3 cls:3	THR ovr:11 cls:9	SIL ovr:5 cls:5	SIL ovr:2 cls:2	BRH ovr:3 cls:3	SNE ovr:3 cls:3	BRH ovr:5 cls:5	BIR; C	DON ovr:6 cls:6	SIL ovr:4 cls:4	12th	26	5th
1989	Kaliber Racing	Ford Sierra RS500	A	OUL; Ret	SIL ovr:7 cls:7	THR ovr:13 cls:10	DON; DSQ	THR; DNS	SIL	SIL ovr:3 cls:3	BRH ovr:4 cls:4	SNE	BRH; Ret	BIR ovr:7 cls:7	DON	SIL ovr:6 cls:6	32nd	8	9th

=== Complete European Touring Car Championship results ===
(key) (Races in bold indicate pole position) (Races in italics indicate fastest lap)

Year	Team	Car	1	2	3	4	5	6	7	8	9	10	11	DC	Pts
1988	Kaliber Racing	Ford Sierra RS500	MNZ	DON	EST	JAR	DIJ	VAL	NÜR	SPA	ZOL	SIL; 6†	NOG	NC	0

† Not eligible for points.
