= 1976 Race of Champions =

- Non-championship race in the 1976 Formula One season

Race details
- Date: 14 March 1976
- Official name: XI Daily Mail Race of Champions
- Location: Brands Hatch Grand Prix Circuit; Fawkham, Kent, England
- Course: Permanent racing facility
- Course length: 4.206 km (2.6136 miles)
- Distance: 40 laps, 168.24 km (104.544 miles)

Pole position
Driver	(South Africa) Jody Scheckter	Tyrrell-Cosworth
- Time: 1:20.42

Fastest lap
Driver	(United Kingdom) James Hunt	McLaren-Cosworth
- Time: 1:23.78

Podium
First	(United Kingdom) James Hunt	McLaren-Cosworth
Second	(Australia) Alan Jones	Surtees-Cosworth
Third	(Belgium) Jacky Ickx	Hesketh-Cosworth

The 1976 Race of Champions was a non-championship Formula One race held at Brands Hatch on 14 March 1976. The 40-lap race was won by James Hunt, driving a McLaren-Cosworth, with Alan Jones second in a Surtees-Cosworth and Jacky Ickx third in a Hesketh-Cosworth entered by Wolf-Williams Racing.

== Qualifying ==
Pos.	No.	Driver	Constructor	Car	Lap	Gap
1	3	(South Africa) Jody Scheckter	Tyrrell-Cosworth	Tyrrell 007	1:20.42	
2	1	(Austria) Niki Lauda	Ferrari	Ferrari 312T2	1:22.77	+2.35
3	6	(Sweden) Gunnar Nilsson	Lotus-Cosworth	Lotus 77	1:23.56	+3.14
4	20	(Belgium) Jacky Ickx	Hesketh-Cosworth	Hesketh 308C	1:23.72	+3.30
5	11	(United Kingdom) James Hunt	McLaren-Cosworth	McLaren M23	1:23.80	+3.38
6	19	(Australia) Alan Jones	Surtees-Cosworth	Surtees TS19	1:23.81	+3.39
7	5	(United Kingdom) Bob Evans	Lotus-Cosworth	Lotus 77	1:24.05	+3.63
8	28	(United Kingdom) John Watson	Penske-Cosworth	Penske PC3	1:24.26	+3.84
9	16	(United Kingdom) Tom Pryce	Shadow-Cosworth	Shadow DN5	1:24.32	+3.90
10	8	(Brazil) Carlos Pace	Brabham-Cosworth	Brabham BT45	1:24.50	+4.08
11	22	(New Zealand) Chris Amon	Ensign-Cosworth	Ensign N174	1:25.08	+4.66
12	32	(Switzerland) Loris Kessel	Brabham-Cosworth	Brabham BT44	1:25.98	+5.56
13	33	(Belgium) Patrick Nève	Brabham-Cosworth	Brabham BT44	1:26.39	+5.97
14	24	(Austria) Harald Ertl	Hesketh-Cosworth	Hesketh 308B	1:26.67	+6.25
15	36	(Italy) Giancarlo Martini	Ferrari	Ferrari 312T	1:27.75	+7.33
16	9	(Italy) Vittorio Brambilla	March-Cosworth	March 761	1:30.23	+9.81
DNA	14	(New Zealand) Larry Perkins	BRM	BRM P201		
DNA	40	(United Kingdom) David Purley	Surtees-Cosworth	Surtees TS16		
DNA	14	(United Kingdom) Ian Ashley	BRM	BRM P201		
DNA	17		Lyncar-Cosworth	Lyncar 006		

== Classification ==
Pos.	No.	Driver	Constructor	Laps	Time/Retired	Grid
1	11	(United Kingdom) James Hunt	McLaren-Cosworth	40	58:01.23	5
2	19	(Australia) Alan Jones	Surtees-Cosworth	40	+ 18.42	6
3	20	(Belgium) Jacky Ickx	Hesketh-Cosworth	40	+ 23.17	4
4	9	(Italy) Vittorio Brambilla	March-Cosworth	40	+ 2:25.69^{1}	16
5	22	(New Zealand) Chris Amon	Ensign-Cosworth	39	+ 1 Lap	11
6	16	(United Kingdom) Tom Pryce	Shadow-Cosworth	39	+ 1 Lap	9
7	33	(Belgium) Patrick Nève	Brabham-Cosworth	39	+ 1 Laps	13
8 (Ret)	6	(Sweden) Gunnar Nilsson	Lotus-Cosworth	38	+ 2 Laps/Engine^{1}	3
DNF	5	(United Kingdom) Bob Evans	Lotus-Cosworth	36	Out of Fuel	7
DNF	32	(Switzerland) Loris Kessel	Brabham-Cosworth	31	Engine	12
DNF	24	(Austria) Harald Ertl	Hesketh-Cosworth	17	Engine	14
DNF	1	(Austria) Niki Lauda	Ferrari	17	Brakes	2
DNF	28	(United Kingdom) John Watson	Penske-Cosworth	12	Accident	8
DNF	8	(Brazil) Carlos Pace	Brabham-Cosworth	8	Engine	10
DNF	3	(South Africa) Jody Scheckter	Tyrrell-Cosworth	2	Accident	1
DNS	36	(Italy) Giancarlo Martini	Ferrari	0	Accident in warm-up	15

^{1} Brambilla and Nilsson were both penalised one minute for jumping the start.

Previous race: 1975 Swiss Grand Prix	Formula One non-championship races 1976 season	Next race: 1976 BRDC International Trophy
Previous race: 1975 Race of Champions	Race of Champions	Next race: 1977 Race of Champions
