= Ray Mallock =

British former racing driver (born 1951)

Anthony Raymond Mallock (born 12 April 1951 in Barton on Sea) is a British former racing driver and founder of RML Group, the motorsports and high performance automotive organisation formally known as Ray Mallock Limited.

Mallock competed in Formula Ford in 1969, Clubmans Formula in 1970 and 1971, Formula 3 in 1971 and 1972 all in Mallock U2 cars of his father's design, Major Arthur Mallock. He then competed in Formula Atlantic, Formula 2 between 1973 and 1977 before the British Formula One Championship from 1978 to 1980.

Mallock competed at Le Mans for the first time in 1979 before returning with the Aston Martin Nimrod programme in 1982, 1983 and 1984. In 1985, 1986 and 1987, he was responsible for the design, development and operation of the Ecurie Ecosse Group C2 cars with which the team won the C2 class of the World Sportscar championship in 1986 with Austin Rover engines. Mallock won 8 rounds of the World Sportscar championship in cars of his own design between 1985 and 1987.

Mallock was responsible for the design and development of the Aston Martin AMR1 Group C1 cars, employing Canadian Max Boxstrom as chief designer.

Mallock retired from professional race car driving in 1989 to concentrate on engineering and developing his business, Ray Mallock Limited.

== Racing record ==
=== Complete European Formula Two Championship results ===
(key) (Races in bold indicate pole position; races in italics indicate fastest lap)

Year	Entrant	Chassis	Engine	1	2	3	4	5	6	7	8	9	10	11	12	13	14	Pos.	Pts
1975	Ardmore Racing	March 742	Ford	EST	THR; Ret	HOC	NÜR	PAU	HOC	SAL	ROU	MUG	PER					25th	1
1975	Ardmore Racing	March 75B	Ford											SIL; 10	ZOL; 6	NOG; 8	VAL; DNS	25th	1
1976	Ardmore Racing	March 75B	Ford	HOC; DNQ	THR; Ret	VAL; 9	SAL; DNQ	PAU; DNQ						NOG; 13	HOC; DNQ			NC	0
1976	Ardmore Racing	Ralt RT1	Ford						HOC; 10	ROU; Ret	MUG	PER	EST					NC	0
1977	Ardmore Racing	Chevron B40	Hart	SIL; 2	THR; Ret	HOC; 9	NÜR	VAL	PAU	MUG; 11	ROU	NOG; DNS	PER	MIS	EST			12th	6
1977	Ardmore Racing	Chevron B35	Ford													DON; DNQ		12th	6
1981	Cliff Smith Racing	Ralt RT4	Ford	SIL; 8	HOC	THR	NÜR	VAL	MUG									NC	0
1981	Cliff Smith Racing	Ralt RT4	Hart							PAU; DNQ	PER	SPA; 9	DON; Ret	MIS	MAN			NC	0
1982	Ray Mallock	Ralt RT4	Ford	SIL; 11	HOC	THR	NÜR	MUG	VAL	PAU	SPA	HOC	DON	MAN	PER	MIS		NC	0

=== Complete Shellsport International Series results ===
(key) (Races in bold indicate pole position; races in italics indicate fastest lap)

Year	Entrant	Chassis	Engine	1	2	3	4	5	6	7	8	9	10	11	12	13	14	Pos.	Pts
1976	Ardmore Racing	Lola T450	Ford BDX Swindon 2.0 L4	MAL; Ret														14th	26
1976	Ardmore Racing	March 75B	Ford BDX Swindon 2.0 L4		SNE; DNS	OUL	BRH	THR	BRH	MAL	SNE; 1	BRH; 13	THR; Ret	OUL	BRH; 6	BRH; DNS		14th	26
1977	ICI Newsweek/Chevron	Chevron B40	Hart 420R 2.0 L4	MAL	SNE	OUL	BRH	MAL	THR	BRH	OUL	MAL	DON	BRH; 5	THR	SNE	BRH	23rd	8

=== Complete British Formula One Championship results ===
(key) (Races in bold indicate pole position; races in italics indicate fastest lap.)

Year	Entrant	Chassis	Engine	1	2	3	4	5	6	7	8	9	10	11	12	13	14	15	Pos.	Pts
1978	Mario Deliotti Racing	Ensign N175	Ford Cosworth DFV 3.0 V8	OUL	BRH	SNE	MAL	ZAN	DON	THR; 3	OUL								16th	12
1978	Alan Baillie	March 752	Ford BDX Swindon 2.0 L4									MAL; 12	BRH	THR	SNE				16th	12
1979	Graham Eden Racing	Chevron B41	Ford Cosworth DFV 3.0 V8	ZOL	OUL	BRH	MAL	SNE; Ret	THR	ZAN	DON	OUL	NOG	MAL	BRH	THR	SNE	SIL	NC	0
1980	Cliff Smith Racing	Surtees TS20+	Ford Cosworth DFV 3.0 V8	OUL; 3	BRH	SIL; 3	MAL	THR; Ret	MNZ	MAL	SNE								10th	8
1980	Cliff Smith Racing	Wolf WR6	Ford Cosworth DFV 3.0 V8									BRH; Ret	THR; Ret	OUL	SIL; Ret				10th	8

=== 24 Hours of Le Mans results ===
Year	Team	Co-Drivers	Car	Class	Laps	Pos.	Class Pos.
1979	(United Kingdom) Fisons Agricole - Simon Phillips	(United Kingdom) Martin Raymond (United Kingdom) Simon Phillips	De Cadenet-Lola T380-Ford Cosworth	S +2.0	250	20th	**3rd**
1982	(United Kingdom) Viscount Downe Pace Petroleum	(United Kingdom) Simon Phillips (United Kingdom) Mike Salmon	Nimrod NRA/C2-Aston Martin Tickford	C	317	7th	4th
1983	(United Kingdom) Viscount Downe - Pace Petroleum	(United Kingdom) Mike Salmon (United States) Steve Earle	Nimrod NRA/C2B-Aston Martin Tickford	C	218	DNF	DNF
1984	(United Kingdom) Viscount Downe Aston Martin	(United States) Drake Olson	Nimrod NRA/C2B-Aston Martin Tickford	C1	94	DNF	DNF
1985	(United Kingdom) Ecurie Ecosse	(United Kingdom) Mike Wilds (United Kingdom) David Leslie	Ecosse C285-Ford Cosworth	C2	45	DNF	DNF
1986	(United Kingdom) Ecurie Ecosse	(United Kingdom) Mike Wilds (United Kingdom) David Leslie	Ecosse C286-Austin-Rover	C2	181	DSQ	DSQ
1987	(United Kingdom) Ecurie Ecosse	(United Kingdom) David Leslie (Belgium) Marc Duez	Ecosse C286-Ford Cosworth	C2	308	8th	**2nd**
1989	(United Kingdom) Aston Martin (United Kingdom) Ecurie Ecosse	(United Kingdom) David Leslie (United Kingdom) David Sears	Aston Martin AMR1	C1	153	DNF	DNF
