= Divina Galica =

British skier and racing driver (born 1944)

Divina Galica MBE
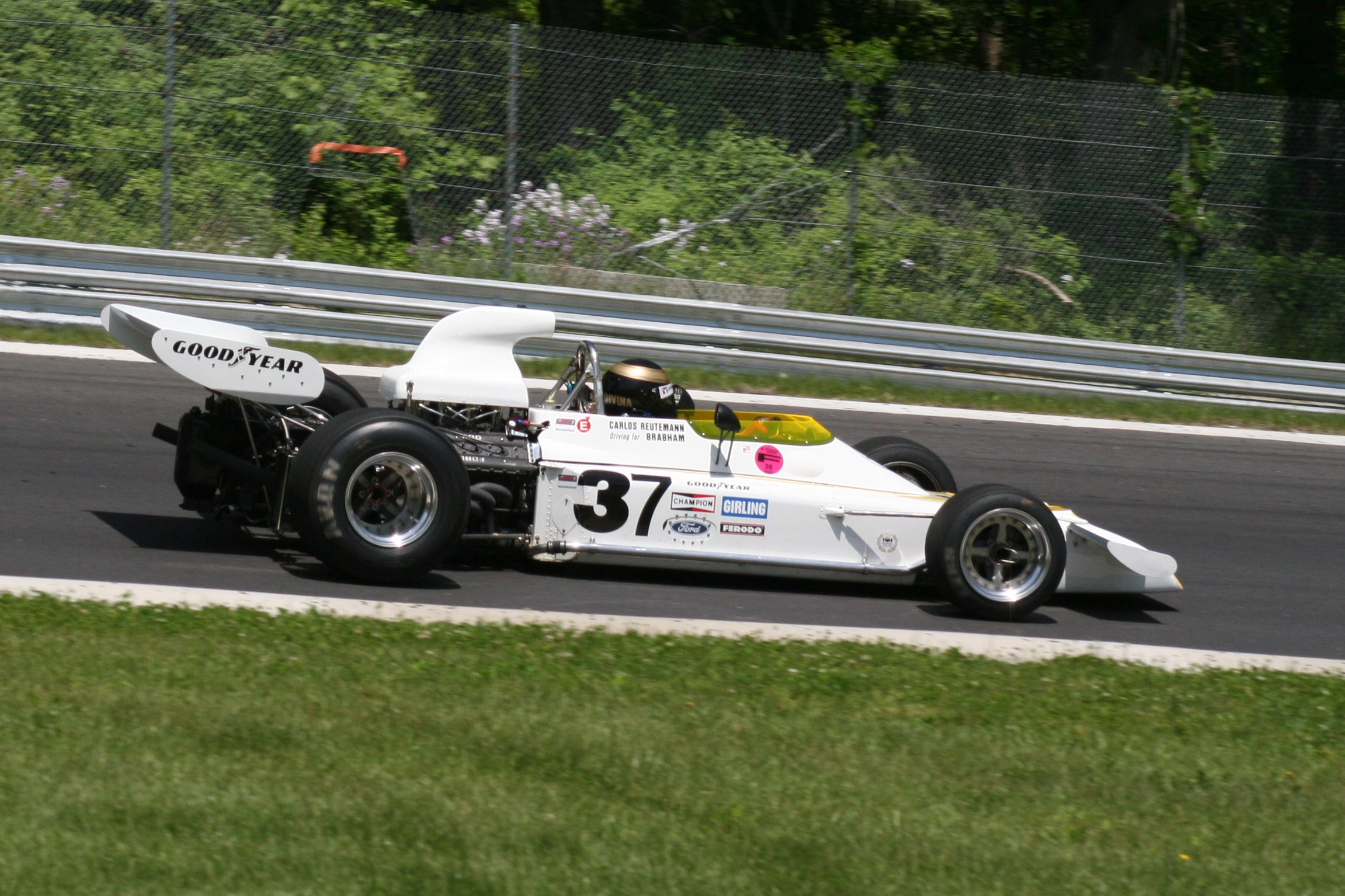
- Galica driving a Brabham BT37 in a Historic Grand Prix at Lime Rock Park in 2009
- Born: 13 August 1944 (age 82); Bushey Heath, Hertfordshire, England, UK

Formula One World Championship career
- Nationality: (United Kingdom) British
- Active years: 1976, 1978
- Team(s): non-works Surtees, Hesketh
- Entries: 3 (0 starts)
- Championships: 0
- Wins: 0
- Podiums: 0
- Career points: 0
- Pole positions: 0
- Fastest laps: 0
- First entry: 1976 British Grand Prix
- Last entry: 1978 Brazilian Grand Prix

British Formula One Championship career
- Active years: 1978–1980
- Entries: 6
- Championships: 0
- Wins: 0
- Podiums: 1
- Career points: 22
- Pole positions: 0
- Fastest laps: 0

Divina Mary Galica MBE (last name pronounced "Galitsa"; born 13 August 1944) is a British sportswoman best known for entering three Formula One World Championship Grands Prix in two separate seasons without qualifying. She also competed at four Winter Olympics as a skier, captaining the British women's national team in 1968 and 1972.

== Skiing career ==
Galica was born in Bushey Heath, near Watford, Hertfordshire, to a Polish father. Aged 19, she participated in her first Olympic games at Innsbruck in 1964, competing in downhill skiing and the slalom. She also participated in the next two winter Olympics, at Grenoble in 1968 and Sapporo in 1972. On both occasions, Galica finished in the top-ten in the giant slalom. Aside from Olympic competition, she achieved two World Cup podium finishes in the downhill event, taking third place at both the Badgastein and Chamonix rounds in 1968, and in 1966, she won the FIS Kandahar of the Andes in Bariloche. She also held the British women's downhill skiing speed record (at 125 mph). Following her subsequent driving career, Galica returned to skiing and once again represented Great Britain at the 1992 Winter Olympics, this time in the speed skiing event.

== Driving career ==
Accepting an invitation to a celebrity auto race, Galica surprised everyone with her driving talent. She eventually took up motorsport as a second career, initially racing karts, moving into Formula Two and Formula One before finding success in sports cars and trucks. Her racing career has included stints in Formula Renault and Formula Vauxhall Lotus.

Galica was taken under the wings of John Webb and Nick Whiting, who entered her in the British Shellsport International Group 8 series in 1976, driving a Surtees TS16 Formula One car. After promising showings in this domestic series, Whiting decided to enter Galica for that year's British Grand Prix, using their Surtees. This appearance was notable as the first time in 13 years that a car had been entered for a World Championship Grand Prix using the supposedly unlucky number 13; so it also proved for Galica, as she failed to qualify for the race. The appearance meant she also joined a select band of seven Formula One drivers who have also competed in the Olympics.

For 1977, Whiting acquired a second-hand Surtees TS19 for Galica to use in the British series. The Whiting team lacked the technical expertise required to properly set the car up for each race, and Galica was often hindered by poorly adjusted machinery. Arch rival Tony Trimmer was also equipped with a Surtees TS19, but his engineering background and well-funded team meant that he was the class of the field at most venues. Whiting managed to secure sponsorship from Olympus Cameras part way through the season, as prior to this the whole team had been run on a budget of only £10,000 for the entire season. Despite this, Galica did manage to take third place at the Brands Hatch and second place at the Donington Park rounds, but with Trimmer winning both he took the Championship title. That same year, Galica participated in the British Sports 2000 Championship and won ten of the twenty races, finishing runner-up in the final standings.

Hesketh Racing's works driver Rupert Keegan had taken part in a couple of rounds of the British domestic series in 1977, and at the start of the 1978 Formula One season, Hesketh offered Galica the opportunity to replace him in the team's Hesketh 308E car. She took the Olympus sponsorship with her (replacing Hesketh's previous Penthouse magazine sponsorship), but failed to qualify the 308E for either of the 1978 World Championship season's first two races. Following the second failure she returned to the British Shellsport Championship, now a fully Formula One series. Reunited with her TS19, Galica took second place at the Zandvoort round. However, in her absence Trimmer had upgraded to an ex-works McLaren M23 car, and with the ageing TS19 she stood little chance of being competitive. A second entry, later in the season, in her own M23 only produced a seventh-place finish.

Aside from a limited number of outings in single-seater cars, Galica switched her attention to the Thundersports S2000 sports car class, taking a number of top ten finishes, and truck racing. She also drove the No. 1 Celebrity car at Brands Hatch in the 1989 Honda CRX Challenge. She became a racing instructor with Skip Barber Racing Schools, rising to become senior vice president of Skip Barber Racing, managing both its driving school and racing series. In 2005, at the Mont-Tremblant weekend of the Skip Barber Race Series, Galica announced she was leaving Skip Barber to work for iRacing.com as a director in the company. Since 2018 (or earlier), she has been working for Bertil Roos Racing School as a driving instructor.

== Racing record ==
=== Complete Shellsport International Series results ===
(key) (note: results shown in bold indicate pole position; results in italics indicate fastest lap.)

| Year | Entrant | Chassis | Engine | 1 | 2 | 3 | 4 | 5 | 6 | 7 | 8 | 9 | 10 | 11 | 12 | 13 | 14 | Pos. | Pts |
|---|---|---|---|---|---|---|---|---|---|---|---|---|---|---|---|---|---|---|---|
| 1976 | ShellSport Whiting | Surtees TS16 | Ford Cosworth DFV 3.0 V8 | MAL; 7 | SNE; 6 | OUL; Ret | BRH; NC | THR; 4 | BRH; 6 | MAL; 4 | SNE; 5 | BRH; 9 | THR; 7 | OUL; 6 | BRH; 13 | BRH; 10 | | 4th | 57 |
| 1977 | ShellSport Whiting | Surtees TS19 | Ford Cosworth DFV 3.0 V8 | MAL; DNS | SNE; 2 | OUL; Ret | | MAL; Ret | THR; Ret | BRH; Ret | OUL; 4 | MAL; 3 | DON; 2 | BRH; 3 | THR; Ret | SNE; DNS | BRH; 6 | 6th | 74 |
| 1977 | ShellSport Whiting | March 742 | Ford BDX Swindon | | | | BRH; Ret | | | | | | | | | | | 6th | 74 |

=== Complete British Formula One Championship results ===
(key) (note: results shown in bold indicate pole position; results in italics indicate fastest lap.)

| Year | Entrant | Chassis | Engine | 1 | 2 | 3 | 4 | 5 | 6 | 7 | 8 | 9 | 10 | 11 | 12 | 13 | 14 | 15 | Pos. | Pts |
|---|---|---|---|---|---|---|---|---|---|---|---|---|---|---|---|---|---|---|---|---|
| 1978 | Team Olympus | Surtees TS19 | Ford Cosworth DFV 3.0 V8 | OUL | BRH | SNE | MAL | ZAN; 2 | DON | THR | OUL | MAL | BRH | | | | | | 14th | 19 |
| 1978 | Melchester Racing | McLaren M23 | Ford Cosworth DFV 3.0 V8 | | | | | | | | | | | THR; 7 | SNE | | | | 14th | 19 |
| 1979 | Divina Galica | March 792 | Hart | ZOL | OUL | BRH; Ret | MAL | SNE | THR | ZAN | DON; 5 | OUL | NOG | MAL | BRH | THR | SNE | SIL | 19th | 2 |
| 1980 | Divina Galica | March 792 | Hart | OUL | BRH | SIL | MAL | THR | MNZ | MAL | SNE | BRH | THR | OUL; 6 | SIL; 9 | | | | 20th | 1 |

=== Complete Formula One World Championship results ===
(key)

| Year | Entrant | Chassis | Engine | 1 | 2 | 3 | 4 | 5 | 6 | 7 | 8 | 9 | 10 | 11 | 12 | 13 | 14 | 15 | 16 | WDC | Pts. |
|---|---|---|---|---|---|---|---|---|---|---|---|---|---|---|---|---|---|---|---|---|---|
| 1976 | ShellSport Whiting | Surtees TS16 | Ford Cosworth DFV 3.0 V8 | BRA | RSA | USW | ESP | BEL | MON | SWE | FRA | GBR; DNQ | GER | AUT | NED | ITA | CAN | USA | JPN | NC | 0 |
| 1978 | Olympus Cameras with Hesketh | Hesketh 308E | Ford Cosworth DFV 3.0 V8 | ARG; DNQ | BRA; DNQ | RSA | USW | MON | BEL | ESP | SWE | FRA | GBR | GER | AUT | NED | ITA | USA | CAN | NC | 0 |

=== Formula One non-championship results ===
(key) (Races in bold indicate pole position.) (Races in italics indicate fastest lap.)

| Year | Entrant | Chassis | Engine | 1 |
|---|---|---|---|---|
| 1977 | ShellSport Whiting | Surtees TS19 | Ford Cosworth DFV 3.0 V8 | ROC; 12 |
| 1978 | Olympus Cameras with Hesketh | Hesketh 308E | Ford Cosworth DFV 3.0 V8 | INT; Ret |

=== Complete European Formula Two Championship results ===
(key) (Races in bold indicate pole position; races in italics indicate fastest lap.)

| Year | Entrant | Chassis | Engine | 1 | 2 | 3 | 4 | 5 | 6 | 7 | 8 | 9 | 10 | 11 | 12 | 13 | Pos. | Pts |
|---|---|---|---|---|---|---|---|---|---|---|---|---|---|---|---|---|---|---|
| 1977 | Ardmore Racing | Chevron B39 | Ford BDA | SIL | THR | HOC | NÜR | VAL | PAU | MUG | ROU | NOG | PER | MIS | EST | DON; 15 | NC | 0 |
| 1978 | Bob Salisbury Racing | March 782 | BMW | THR | HOC | NÜR | PAU | MUG | VAL | ROU | DON | NOG | PER | MIS | HOC; DNQ | | NC | 0 |
| 1979 | Divina Galica | March 792 | Hart | SIL; 11 | HOC | THR | NÜR; 17 | VAL | MUG | PAU | HOC | ZAN | PER | MIS | DON; 11 | | NC | 0 |
| 1980 | Wendy Wools | March 792 | Hart | THR; Ret | HOC | NÜR | VAL | PAU | | | | | | | | | NC | 0 |
| 1980 | Divina Galica | March 792 | Hart | | | | | | SIL; Ret | ZOL | MUG | ZAN | PER | MIS | HOC | | NC | 0 |

== See also ==
- List of female Formula One drivers
