= Giancarlo Martini =

Italian racing driver

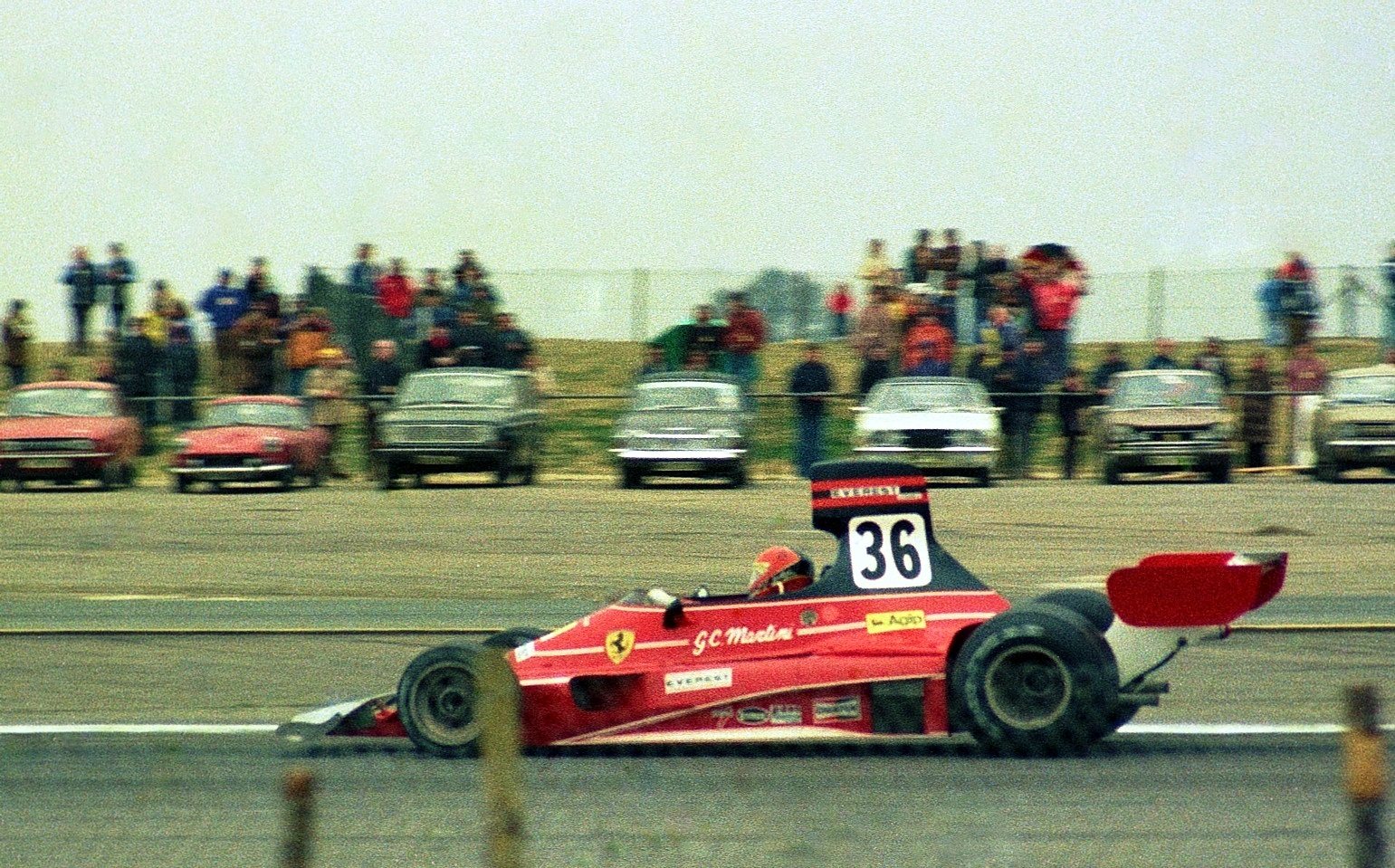
- Martini driving the Scuderia Everest Ferrari 312T in the 1976 BRDC International Trophy race at Silverstone
- Nationality: (Italy) Italian
- Born: 16 August 1947 Lavezzola, Italy
- Died: 26 March 2013 (aged 65) Forlì, Italy
- Relatives: Pierluigi Martini; Oliver Martini

European Formula Two Championship
- Years active: 1974–1979
- Starts: 42
- Wins: 0
- Podiums: 2
- Poles: 0
- Fastest laps: 0
- Best finish: 7th in 1976

Previous series
- 1978 1972–1973: British Formula One; Formula Italia

Championship titles
- 1973: Formula Italia

British Formula One Championship career
- Active years: 1978
- Entries: 2
- Championships: 0
- Wins: 1
- Podiums: 1
- Career points: 32
- Pole positions: 1
- Fastest laps: 1

Giancarlo Martini (16 August 1947 – 26 March 2013) was a racing driver from Italy. He participated in two non-championship Formula One Grands Prix driving a Ferrari 312T for Giancarlo Minardi. He was the uncle of the racing drivers Pierluigi Martini and Oliver Martini.

== Racing record ==
=== Complete European Formula Two Championship results ===
(key) (Races in bold indicate pole position; races in italics indicate fastest lap)

Year	Entrant	Chassis	Engine	1	2	3	4	5	6	7	8	9	10	11	12	13	14	Pos.	Pts
1974	Trivellato Racing	March 742	BMW	BAR; 7	HOC	PAU; 9	SAL	HOC; Ret	MUG; 5	KAR	PER							16th	2
1974	Scuderia Everest	March 742	BMW									HOC; 16	VAL; Ret					16th	2
1975	Scuderia Everest	March 752	BMW	EST; 6	THR; 3	HOC; 14	NÜR; 9	PAU; DNQ	HOC; 10	SAL; 16	ROU	MUG; Ret	PER; 7	SIL; 6	ZOL	NOG; 13	VAL; 5	15th	8
1976	Scuderia Everest	March 762	BMW	HOC	THR; 19	VAL; 15	SAL; Ret	PAU; 5	HOC; 6	ROU; 3	MUG; 5	PER; Ret	EST	NOG; Ret	HOC; 9			7th	12
1977	Scuderia Everest	Martini Mk. 22	Renault	SIL; Ret	THR; Ret	HOC; Ret	NÜR; 12	VAL; Ret	PAU; Ret	MUG; Ret	ROU	NOG; 8	PER; Ret	MIS; Ret	EST; 12	DON; Ret		NC	0
1978	Scuderia Everest	Chevron B40	BMW	THR	HOC	NÜR; 19	PAU	MUG										NC	0
1978	ICI Chevron Cars	Chevron B42	Hart						VAL; DNQ	ROU	DON	NOG	PER	MIS	HOC			NC	0
1979	Polifac BMW Junior Team	March 792	BMW	SIL	HOC	THR	NÜR	VAL	MUG; 14	PAU	HOC	ZAN	PER	MIS	DON			NC	0

=== Complete Formula One results ===
(Note: races in bold denote pole position.)

==== Non-championship results ====
Year	Event	Venue	Team	Car	Result
1976	Race of Champions	Brands Hatch	Scuderia Everest	Ferrari 312T	DNS
1976	BRDC International Trophy	Silverstone	Scuderia Everest	Ferrari 312T	10
