= Surtees TS19 =

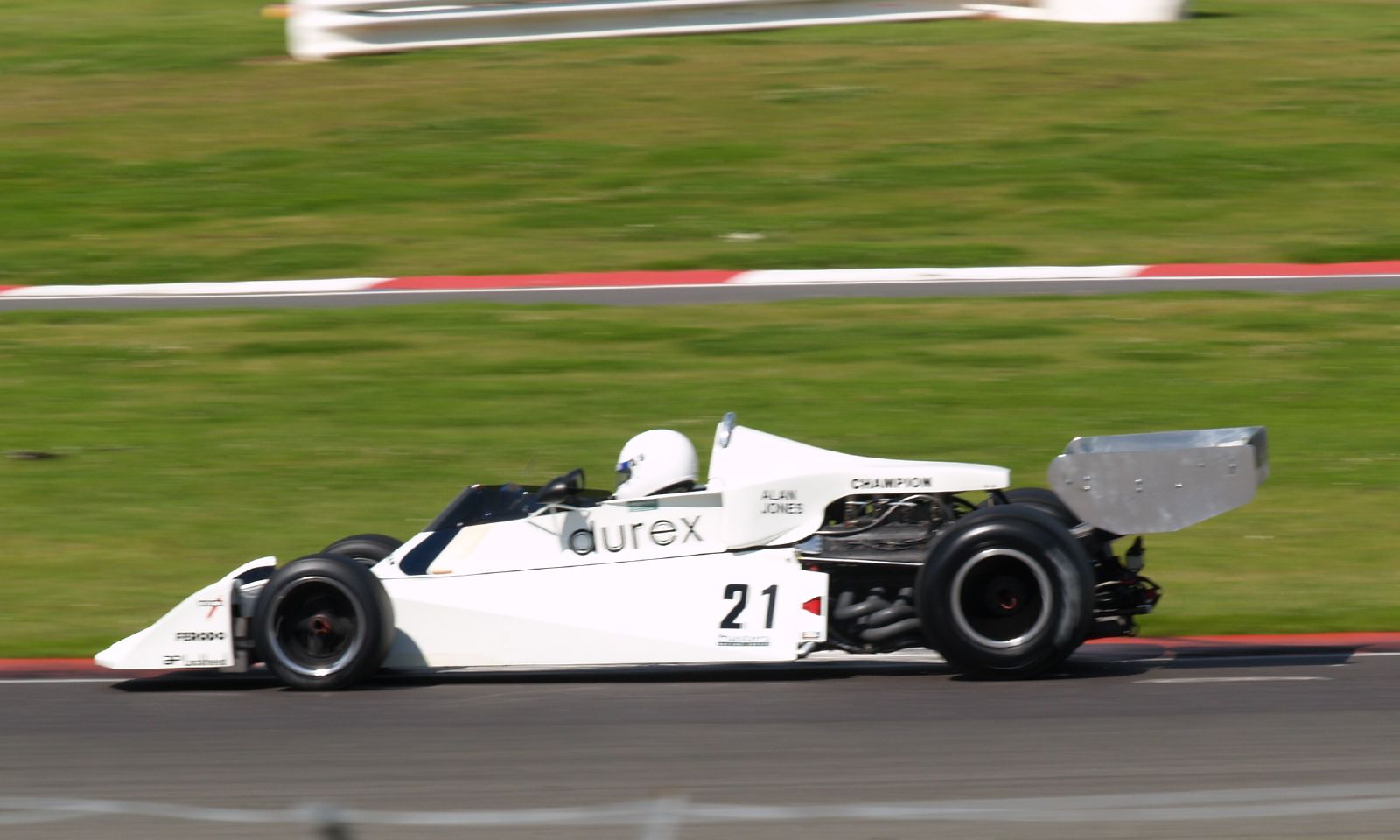
- Category: Formula One
- Constructor: Surtees
- Designers: John Surtees; Ken Sears
- Predecessor: Surtees TS16
- Successor: Surtees TS20

Technical specifications
- Chassis: Aluminium alloy monocoque
- Axle track: Front: 1,473 mm (58.0 in); Rear: 1,499 mm (59.0 in)
- Wheelbase: 2,502 mm (98.5 in)
- Engine: Ford-Cosworth DFV 2,993 cc (182.6 cu in) V8 naturally aspirated mid-engine, longitudinally mounted
- Transmission: Hewland FGA 400, 5 or 6-speed manual
- Weight: 580 kg (1,280 lb)
- Fuel: FINA
- Tyres: Goodyear

Competition history
- Notable entrants: Team Surtees; Beta Team Surtees; Durex Team Surtees
- Notable drivers: (Australia) Alan Jones (France) Patrick Tambay (Italy) Vittorio Brambilla
- Debut: 1976 South African Grand Prix
| Races | Wins | Poles | F/Laps |
|---|---|---|---|
| 38 | 0 | 0 | 0 |
- Unless otherwise stated, all data refer to Formula One World Championship Grands Prix only.

The Surtees TS19 was a Formula One (F1) car used by Surtees during the 1976, 1977 and 1978 F1 seasons. It was designed by John Surtees and Ken Sears.

== Racing history ==
=== Team Surtees ===
==== 1976 ====
For 1976, Surtees chose a controversial sponsorship deal with Durex condoms and signed Australian Alan Jones to drive. A second car was driven by Brett Lunger, with sponsorship from Campari. The team skipped the 1976 Brazilian Grand Prix because the TS19 was not ready. The TS19 was used at the South African Grand Prix but only one car was available for Lunger, who finished 11th. A second TS19 was ready for Jones for the United States Grand Prix West, but the Australian finished ten laps down and was not classified; Lunger failed to qualify for his home race. At the Spanish Grand Prix, Jones finished ninth and Lunger failed to qualify. The Belgian Grand Prix saw the Australian finish fifth and the American retire with an electrical problem. Before the Monaco Grand Prix, Lunger's TS19 had been sold to Henri Pescarolo's Team Norev, and the American was waiting for the team to finish a new TS19 for him. Jones retired because he and Carlos Reutemann's Brabham crashed at the Sainte-Dévote corner. The Swedish Grand Prix saw the Australian finish 13th and the American return with a new TS19 and finish 15th. At the French Grand Prix, Jones retired with suspension failure and Lunger finished 16th. At the British Grand Prix, the Australian finished in fifth, and the American dropped out with a broken gearbox.

At the German Grand Prix, Jones finished tenth and Lunger retired because he and Harald Ertl's Hesketh both collided with Niki Lauda's Ferrari. Guy Edwards's Hesketh managed to avoid the Ferrari, which caught on fire. All three drivers stopped and tried to get Lauda out of the flames; they were joined by Arturo Merzario, who stopped his Wolf–Williams car after seeing the wreck. The Austrian Grand Prix saw both drivers crash. The Australian retired on lap 30, and the American crashed with three laps to go but finished tenth. Before the Dutch Grand Prix, Lunger had stepped down from Surtees and Sweden's Conny Andersson had been added; he retired with engine failure, and Jones finished eighth. Lunger returned for the Italian Grand Prix; the American finished 14th, and the Australian finished 12th. At the Canadian Grand Prix, Lunger finished 15th and Jones finished 16th. In the United States Grand Prix East, the Australian finished eighth, and the American finished 11th. For the Japanese Grand Prix, Noritake Takahara rented a TS19, replacing Lunger; he finished ninth, and Jones finished fourth.

The Surtees team finished tenth in the Constructors' Championship standings, with seven points.

==== 1977 ====
For 1977, Surtees had a new driver lineup. Austrian Hans Binder drove the Durex-sponsored car, and Italian Vittorio Brambilla drove with sponsorship from Beta. The first race of the year was the 1977 Argentine Grand Prix; Binder retired with a crash, and Brambilla ran out of fuel five laps from the finish, resulting in a seventh-place finish. Both cars dropped out of the Brazilian Grand Prix, the Italian with an accident and the Austrian with a broken suspension. The South African Grand Prix saw Brambilla finish seventh and Binder 11th. At the United States Grand Prix West, the Austrian finished 11th, and the Italian retired due to a crash. The Spanish Grand Prix saw Brambilla retire after a collision with Clay Regazzoni (Ensign); Binder finished ninth. At the Monaco Grand Prix, the Italian finished eighth, and the Austrian retired with a fuel system failure. Before the Belgian Grand Prix, Binder was dropped and the team hired Australian Larry Perkins, who finished 12th, with Brambilla 4th. The Australian failed to qualify for the Swedish Grand Prix, and the Italian retired with a fuel pressure problem. The French Grand Prix saw Brambilla finish 13th; Perkins was replaced halfway through practice by Frenchman Patrick Tambay, but neither Perkins nor Tambay qualified. For the British Grand Prix, Brambilla finished eighth, with new teammate Australian Vern Schuppan finishing 12th. The German Grand Prix saw the Italian finish fifth and the Australian seventh. At the Austrian Grand Prix, Brambilla finished 15th and Schuppan 16th. Schuppan failed to qualify for the Dutch Grand Prix; the Italian finished 12th. At the Italian Grand Prix, Italian Lamberto Leoni replaced Schuppan but failed to qualify, and Brambilla retired due to a crash. Before the United States Grand Prix East Leoni was replaced by Binder, who finished 11th; Brambilla finished 19th. At the Canadian Grand Prix, Brambilla finished sixth, and Binder crashed. The Japanese Grand Prix saw the Italian finish eighth; the Austrian retired after Mario Andretti's wheel came off his Lotus, causing both Binder and Noritake Takahara (Kojima) to spin out.

The Surtees team finished eleventh in the Constructors' Championship standings, with six points.

==== 1978 ====
Surtees retained Brambilla for 1978, and Binder was replaced by Englishman Rupert Keegan. The first race of 1978 was the 1978 Argentine Grand Prix, in which Brambilla finished 18th and Keegan retired with overheating. At the Brazilian Grand Prix, the Italian failed to qualify and the Englishman retired due to a crash. The South African Grand Prix saw Brambilla finish 12th; Keegan retired when his engine failed. The Italian retired with transmission failure at the United States Grand Prix West; Keegan qualified but did not start due to a practice accident. On 25 April, at Brands Hatch, Barry Sheene had a private test session in the car, during which George Harrison drove a lap. For the Monaco Grand Prix, Brambilla drove the new Surtees TS20, but Keegan was still using the TS19 as there was only one TS20 available. Keegan retired with transmission failure. At the Belgian Grand Prix, the TS19's last race, the Englishman failed to qualify. There were two TS20 cars available for the rest of the year. The team had no Constructors points or driver points from the TS19 or the TS20 in 1978. Unable to raise sufficient money, the team left F1 after the 1978 season, despite having a car built for 1979. After racing the car in the British Aurora (formerly F5000) series briefly that year, Surtees Racing Organization ceased operations.

=== Team Norev Racing ===
In 1976, Team Norev Racing bought a TS19 from Surtees and hired Frenchman Henri Pescarolo. The team entered the 1976 Monaco Grand Prix, but Pescarolo failed to qualify. The team skipped Sweden but entered the French Grand Prix, at which Pescarolo retired due to suspension failure. Pescarolo retired from the British Grand Prix because his fuel system failed. The Frenchman failed to qualify for the German Grand Prix. Pescarolo finished ninth at Austria. The Frenchman finished 11th at the Dutch Grand Prix. Pescarolo finished 17th at the Italian Grand Prix and 19th at the Canadian Grand Prix. At the United States Grand Prix East, Pescarolo was eleven laps down and not classified. Team Norev Racing choose not to race the Japanese Grand Prix to concentrate on the McLaren effort in 1977.

=== Melchester Racing ===
In 1977, Melchester Racing bought a TS19 from Surtees and hired Englishman Tony Trimmer to drive at his home race, The 1977 British Grand Prix, but he failed to pre-qualify. Melchester Racing chose not to enter the rest of 1977, entering McLarens instead for 1978.

== Complete Formula One World Championship results ==
(key) (results in italics indicate fastest lap)

| Year | Entrant | Engines | Tyres | Drivers | 1 | 2 | 3 | 4 | 5 | 6 | 7 | 8 | 9 | 10 | 11 | 12 | 13 | 14 | 15 | 16 | 17 | Points | WCC |
|---|---|---|---|---|---|---|---|---|---|---|---|---|---|---|---|---|---|---|---|---|---|---|---|
| 1976 | Team Surtees | Ford Cosworth DFV 3.0 V8 | G | | BRA | RSA | USW | ESP | BEL | MON | SWE | FRA | GBR | GER | AUT | NED | ITA | CAN | USA | JPN | | 7 | 10th |
| 1976 | Team Surtees | Ford Cosworth DFV 3.0 V8 | G | Brett Lunger | | 11 | DNQ | DNQ | Ret | | 15 | 16 | Ret | Ret | 10 | | 14 | 15 | 11 | | | 7 | 10th |
| 1976 | Team Surtees | Ford Cosworth DFV 3.0 V8 | G | Conny Andersson | | | | | | | | | | | | Ret | | | | | | 7 | 10th |
| 1976 | Team Surtees | Ford Cosworth DFV 3.0 V8 | G | Noritake Takahara | | | | | | | | | | | | | | | | 9 | | 7 | 10th |
| 1976 | Durex Team Surtees | Ford Cosworth DFV 3.0 V8 | G | Alan Jones | | | NC | 9 | 5 | Ret | 13 | Ret | 5 | 10 | Ret | 8 | 12 | 16 | 8 | 4 | | 7 | 10th |
| 1976 | Team Norev Racing | Ford Cosworth DFV 3.0 V8 | G | Henri Pescarolo | | | | | | DNQ | | Ret | Ret | DNQ | 9 | 11 | 17 | 19 | NC | | | 7 | 10th |
| 1977 | Beta Team Surtees | Ford Cosworth DFV 3.0 V8 | G | | ARG | BRA | RSA | USW | ESP | MON | BEL | SWE | FRA | GBR | GER | AUT | NED | ITA | USA | CAN | JPN | 6 | 11th |
| 1977 | Beta Team Surtees | Ford Cosworth DFV 3.0 V8 | G | Vittorio Brambilla | 7 | Ret | 7 | Ret | Ret | 8 | 4 | Ret | 13 | 8 | 5 | 15 | 12 | Ret | 19 | 6 | 8 | 6 | 11th |
| 1977 | Durex Team Surtees | Ford Cosworth DFV 3.0 V8 | G | Hans Binder | Ret | Ret | 11 | 11 | 9 | Ret | | | | | | | | | 11 | Ret | Ret | 6 | 11th |
| 1977 | Durex Team Surtees | Ford Cosworth DFV 3.0 V8 | G | Larry Perkins | | | | | | | 12 | DNQ | DNQ | | | | | | | | | 6 | 11th |
| 1977 | Durex Team Surtees | Ford Cosworth DFV 3.0 V8 | G | Patrick Tambay | | | | | | | | | DNQ | | | | | | | | | 6 | 11th |
| 1977 | Durex Team Surtees | Ford Cosworth DFV 3.0 V8 | G | Vern Schuppan | | | | | | | | | | 12 | 7 | 16 | DNQ | | | | | 6 | 11th |
| 1977 | Durex Team Surtees | Ford Cosworth DFV 3.0 V8 | G | Lamberto Leoni | | | | | | | | | | | | | | DNQ | | | | 6 | 11th |
| 1977 | Melchester Racing | Ford Cosworth DFV 3.0 V8 | G | Tony Trimmer | | | | | | | | | | DNPQ | | | | | | | | 6 | 11th |
| 1978 | Beta Team Surtees | Ford Cosworth DFV 3.0 V8 | G | | ARG | BRA | RSA | USW | MON | BEL | ESP | SWE | FRA | GBR | GER | AUT | NED | ITA | USA | CAN | | 1 | 13th |
| 1978 | Beta Team Surtees | Ford Cosworth DFV 3.0 V8 | G | Vittorio Brambilla | 18 | DNQ | 12 | Ret | | | | | | | | | | | | | | 1 | 13th |
| 1978 | Durex Team Surtees | Ford Cosworth DFV 3.0 V8 | G | Rupert Keegan | Ret | Ret | Ret | DNS | Ret | DNQ | | | | | | | | | | | | 1 | 13th |

== Non-Championship results ==
(key) (results in italics indicate fastest lap)

| Year | Entrant | Engines | Tyres | Drivers | 1 | 2 |
|---|---|---|---|---|---|---|
| 1976 | Durex Team Surtees | Ford Cosworth DFV 3.0 V8 | G | | ROC | INT |
| 1976 | Durex Team Surtees | Ford Cosworth DFV 3.0 V8 | G | Alan Jones | 2 | 8 |
| 1976 | Team Surtees | Ford Cosworth DFV 3.0 V8 | G | Brett Lunger | | DNS |
| 1977 | Beta Team Surtees | Ford Cosworth DFV 3.0 V8 | G | | ROC | |
| 1977 | Beta Team Surtees | Ford Cosworth DFV 3.0 V8 | G | Vittorio Brambilla | Ret | |
| 1977 | Shellsport/Whiting | Ford Cosworth DFV 3.0 V8 | G | Divina Galica | 12 | |
| 1977 | Melchester Racing | Ford Cosworth DFV 3.0 V8 | G | Tony Trimmer | 9 | |
| 1978 | Durex Team Surtees | Ford Cosworth DFV 3.0 V8 | G | | INT | |
| 1978 | Durex Team Surtees | Ford Cosworth DFV 3.0 V8 | G | Rupert Keegan | 5 | |
