= Richard Jones (racing driver) =

British former racing driver (born 1949)

- Born: February 4, 1949 (age 77)
- Occupation: Racing Driver

Richard Jones (born 3 February 1949) is a British former racing driver.

Jones competed in the British Formula One Championship from 1978 to 1980.
