= 1976 BRDC International Trophy =

- Non-championship race in the 1976 Formula One season
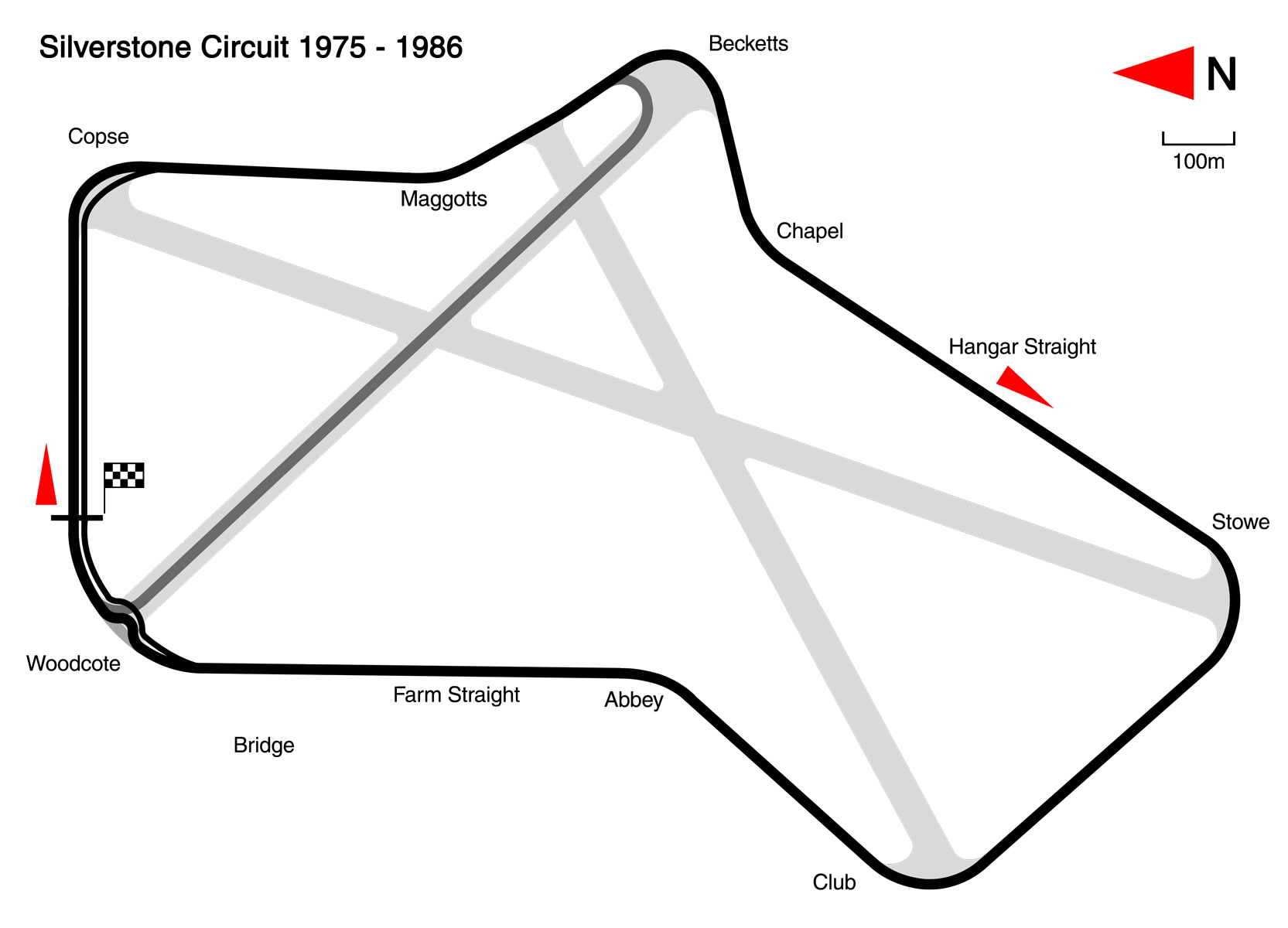
- The Silverstone circuit in 1976.

Race details
- Date: 11 April 1976
- Official name: XXVIII BRDC Graham Hill International Trophy
- Location: Silverstone Circuit, Northamptonshire
- Course: Permanent racing facility
- Course length: 4.718 km (2.935 miles)
- Distance: 40 laps, 188.95 km (117.41 miles)
- Weather: Dry

Pole position
Driver	(United Kingdom) James Hunt	McLaren-Ford
- Time: 1:17.91

Fastest lap
Driver	(United Kingdom) James Hunt	McLaren-Ford
- Time: 1:18.81 on lap 28

Podium
First	(United Kingdom) James Hunt	McLaren-Ford
Second	(Italy) Vittorio Brambilla	March-Ford
Third	(South Africa) Jody Scheckter	Tyrrell-Ford

The 28th BRDC International Trophy was a non-championship Formula One race held at Silverstone on 11 April 1976. The 40-lap race was won from pole position by Englishman James Hunt, driving a McLaren-Ford, who also set the fastest lap. Italian Vittorio Brambilla finished second in a March-Ford, with South African Jody Scheckter third in a Tyrrell-Ford.

== Qualifying classification ==
Pos	No	Driver	Constructor	Time	Gap
1	11	(United Kingdom) James Hunt	McLaren-Ford	1:17.91	
2	9	(Italy) Vittorio Brambilla	March-Ford	1:18.76	+0.85
3	16	(United Kingdom) Tom Pryce	Shadow-Ford	1:19.20	+1.29
4	5	(Sweden) Gunnar Nilsson	Lotus-Ford	1:19.41	+1.50
5	3	(South Africa) Jody Scheckter	Tyrrell-Ford	1:19.70	+1.79
6	17	(France) Jean-Pierre Jarier	Shadow-Ford	1:19.80	+1.89
7	19	(Australia) Alan Jones	Surtees-Ford	1:20.12	+2.21
8	8	(Brazil) Carlos Pace	Brabham-Alfa Romeo	1:20.24	+2.33
9	21	(United States) Mario Andretti	Wolf-Williams-Ford	1:20.25	+2.34
10	36	(Italy) Giancarlo Martini	Ferrari	1:20.28	+2.37
11	32	(Belgium) Patrick Nève	Brabham-Ford	1:20.38	+2.47
12	33	(Switzerland) Loris Kessel	Brabham-Ford	1:20.84	+2.93
13	22	(New Zealand) Chris Amon	Ensign-Ford	1:21.14	+3.23
14	40	(United Kingdom) Damien Magee	Brabham-Ford	1:21.32	+3.41
15	20	(Belgium) Jacky Ickx	Wolf-Williams-Ford	1:21.45	+3.54
16	18	(United States) Brett Lunger	Surtees-Ford	1:21.57	+3.66
17	24	(United Kingdom) Guy Edwards	Hesketh-Ford	1:22.28	+4.37
18	41	(Australia) Brian McGuire	Williams-Ford	1:22.65	+4.74

== Race classification ==
Pos	No	Driver	Constructor	Laps	Time/Retired	Grid
1	11	(United Kingdom) James Hunt	McLaren-Ford	40	53:04.57	1
2	9	(Italy) Vittorio Brambilla	March-Ford	40	+ 11.24	2
3	3	(South Africa) Jody Scheckter	Tyrrell-Ford	40	+ 37.37	5
4	16	(United Kingdom) Tom Pryce	Shadow-Ford	40	+ 42.66	3
5	17	(France) Jean-Pierre Jarier	Shadow-Ford	40	+ 43.70	6
6	5	(Sweden) Gunnar Nilsson	Lotus-Ford	40	+ 44.07	4
7	21	(United States) Mario Andretti	Wolf-Williams-Ford	40	+ 1:10.71	9
8	19	(Australia) Alan Jones	Surtees-Ford	40	+ 1:28.61	7
9	8	(Brazil) Carlos Pace	Brabham-Alfa Romeo	39	+ 1 lap	8
10	36	(Italy) Giancarlo Martini	Ferrari	39	+ 1 lap	10
11	32	(Belgium) Patrick Nève	Brabham-Ford	39	+ 1 lap	11
12	33	(Switzerland) Loris Kessel	Brabham-Ford	39	+ 1 lap	12
Ret	41	(Australia) Brian McGuire	Williams-Ford	30	Oil leak	18
Ret	40	(United Kingdom) Damien Magee	Brabham-Ford	23	Engine	14
Ret	20	(Belgium) Jacky Ickx	Wolf-Williams-Ford	20	Gear lever	15
Ret	24	(United Kingdom) Guy Edwards	Hesketh-Ford	17	Exhaust	17
DNS	22	(New Zealand) Chris Amon	Ensign-Ford		Engine	13
DNS	18	(United States) Brett Lunger	Surtees-Ford		Driver injured	16

Previous race: 1976 Race of Champions	Formula One non-championship races 1976 season	Next race: 1977 Race of Champions
Previous race: 1975 BRDC International Trophy	BRDC International Trophy	Next race: 1977 BRDC International Trophy
