= Surtees TS20 =

Formula One car

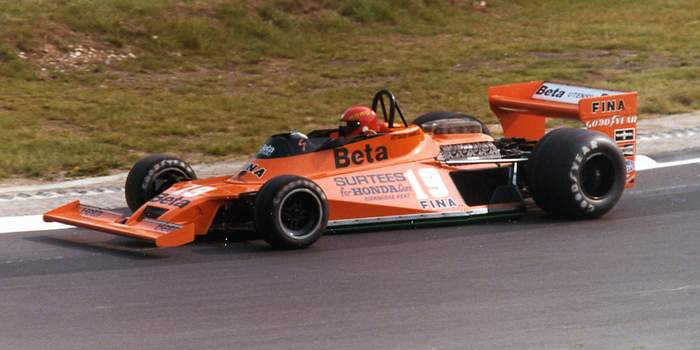
- Surtees TS20 (Vittorio Brambilla), Brands Hatch, 1978
- Category: Formula One
- Constructor: Surtees
- Designers: John Surtees; Ken Sears
- Predecessor: Surtees TS19

Technical specifications
- Chassis: Aluminium alloy monocoque
- Axle track: Front: 1,651 mm (65.0 in); Rear: 1,613 mm (63.5 in)
- Wheelbase: 2,642 mm (104.0 in)
- Engine: Ford-Cosworth DFV 2,993 cc (182.6 cu in) V8 naturally aspirated Mid-engine, longitudinally mounted
- Transmission: Hewland FGA 400 6-speed manual
- Weight: 601 kg (1,325.0 lb)
- Fuel: FINA
- Tyres: Goodyear

Competition history
- Notable entrants: Beta Team Surtees; Durex Team Surtees
- Notable drivers: (Italy) Vittorio Brambilla (Italy) Beppe Gabbiani (United Kingdom) Rupert Keegan (Italy) Gimax (France) René Arnoux
- Debut: 1978 Monaco Grand Prix
Races	Wins	Poles	F/Laps
12	0	0	0
- Unless otherwise stated, all data refer to Formula One World Championship Grands Prix only.

The Surtees TS20 was a Formula One car used by Surtees during the 1978 Formula One season. It was designed by John Surtees and Ken Sears.

== Racing history ==
The team used the Surtees TS19 for the first four races before it was replaced by the TS20. Only one chassis was available for Italian Vittorio Brambilla. The TS20 made its debut at the 1978 Monaco Grand Prix but Brambilla failed to qualify. The Italian finished 13th in Belgium. For the Spanish Grand Prix, a second car became available for Englishman Rupert Keegan. Both men finished the race with Brambilla seventh and Keegan 11th. At Sweden, the Englishman failed to qualify and the Italian retired with an accident. The French Grand Prix saw Brambilla 17th and Keegan retire with engine failure. At Britain, the Englishman failed to qualify and the Italian finished ninth. The German Grand Prix saw Brambilla retire with fuel system failure and Keegan fail to qualify. At Austria, the Englishman failed to qualify and the Italian finished sixth. The Dutch Grand Prix saw Brambilla disqualified after a push at the start of the race and Keegan did not start after crashing in the Sunday warm-up and injuring his hand. Keegan was fired after the race and was replaced by Italian driver Gimax for Italy who failed to qualify and Brambilla retired after he, James Hunt, Riccardo Patrese, Ronnie Peterson, Hans-Joachim Stuck, Patrick Depailler, Didier Pironi, Derek Daly, Clay Regazzoni and Brett Lunger were all involved in an accident before the first corner. Brambilla suffered serious head injuries when he was hit by a flying wheel during the multiple collision on the opening lap but survived. Brambilla was replaced by Italian Beppe Gabbiani and Gimax was replaced by Frenchman René Arnoux for the final two races. For the United States Grand Prix East Gabbiani failed to qualify and Arounx finished ninth. For the final round in Canada, the Italian failed to qualify and the Frenchman retired with engine failure. Unable to get sufficient money, the team left F1 after the 1978 season, despite having a car built for 1979. After racing the car in the British Aurora series (formerly F5000) briefly that year, Surtees Racing Organization was closed for good.

== Complete Formula One World Championship results ==
(key) (results in italics indicate fastest lap)

Year	Entrant	Engines	Tyres	Drivers	1	2	3	4	5	6	7	8	9	10	11	12	13	14	15	16	Points	WCC
1978	Beta Team Surtees	Ford Cosworth DFV; 3.0 V8	G		ARG	BRA	RSA	USW	MON	BEL	ESP	SWE	FRA	GBR	GER	AUT	NED	ITA	USA	CAN	1	13th
1978	Beta Team Surtees	Ford Cosworth DFV; 3.0 V8	G	Vittorio Brambilla					DNQ	13	7	Ret	17	9	Ret	6	DSQ	Ret			1	13th
1978	Beta Team Surtees	Ford Cosworth DFV; 3.0 V8	G	Beppe Gabbiani															DNQ	DNQ	1	13th
1978	Durex Team Surtees	Ford Cosworth DFV; 3.0 V8	G	Rupert Keegan							11	DNQ	Ret	DNQ	DNQ	DNQ	DNS				1	13th
1978	Durex Team Surtees	Ford Cosworth DFV; 3.0 V8	G	Brian Henton												PO					1	13th
1978	Durex Team Surtees	Ford Cosworth DFV; 3.0 V8	G	Gimax														DNQ			1	13th
1978	Durex Team Surtees	Ford Cosworth DFV; 3.0 V8	G	René Arnoux															9	Ret	1	13th
