= Hesketh 308E =

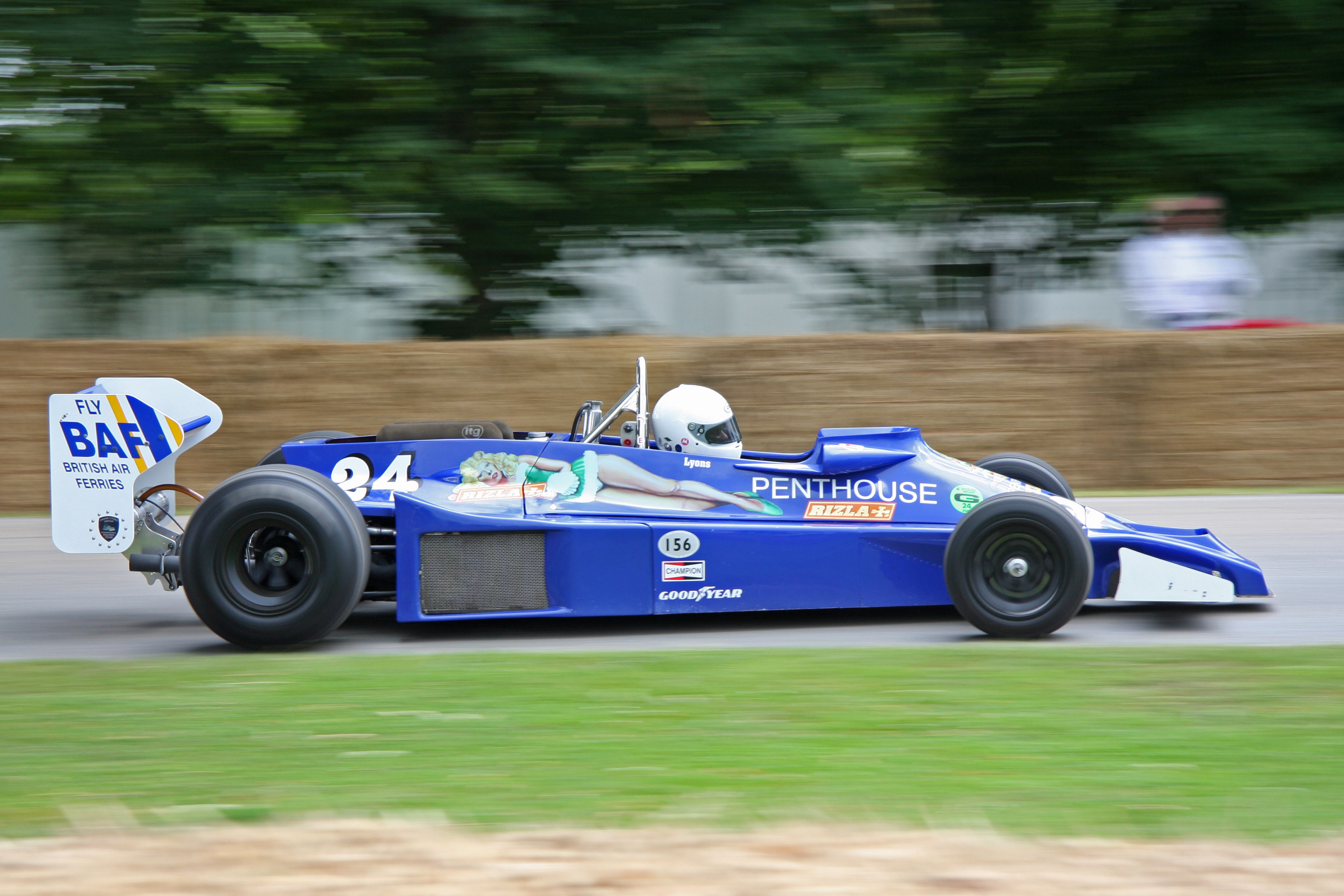
- Category: Formula One
- Constructor: Hesketh Racing
- Designers: Nigel Stroud (Technical Director); Frank Dernie (Chief Designer)

Technical specifications
- Chassis: Aluminium monocoque.
- Suspension (front): Double wishbone with coilover spring/dampers.
- Suspension (rear): As front.
- Engine: Ford-Cosworth DFV 2993 cc V8. Naturally aspirated, mid-mounted.
- Transmission: Hewland FGA400 5-speed manual. Hewland cam and pawl differential.
- Fuel: FINA
- Tyres: Goodyear

Competition history
- Notable entrants: Penthouse Rizla Racing; Olympus Cameras Hesketh
- Notable drivers: (Mexico) Héctor Rebaque (United States) Eddie Cheever (Republic of Ireland) Derek Daly
- Debut: 1977 Race of Champions; Brands Hatch
| Races | Wins | Poles | F/Laps |
|---|---|---|---|
| 18 | 0 | 0 | 0 |
- Unless otherwise stated, all data refer to Formula One World Championship Grands Prix only.

The Hesketh 308E is a Formula One racing car model built by the Hesketh Racing team in 1977. The car was designed by Frank Dernie and Nigel Stroud and was the last car built by the Hesketh team before it folded at the end of 1978.

The 308E was a relatively conservative design, with an aluminium monocoque chassis built around the common Cosworth DFV engine and Hewland gearbox combination. However, the 308E gained particular notoriety owing to Hesketh's team sponsors in 1977 – Penthouse and Rizla – and the resultant livery which incorporated a large rendering of a scantily clad Penthouse Pet embracing a Rizla packet. During this year, driver Rupert Keegan managed to qualify the car at every race entered although its best finish was only seventh place at the Austrian Grand Prix. For 1978 the team reverted to rather less controversial sponsorship from the Olympus Corporation, although results were less dependable. Following Hesketh's withdrawal from the F1 World Championship the remaining 308Es were run for various competitors in the British Aurora AFX championship.

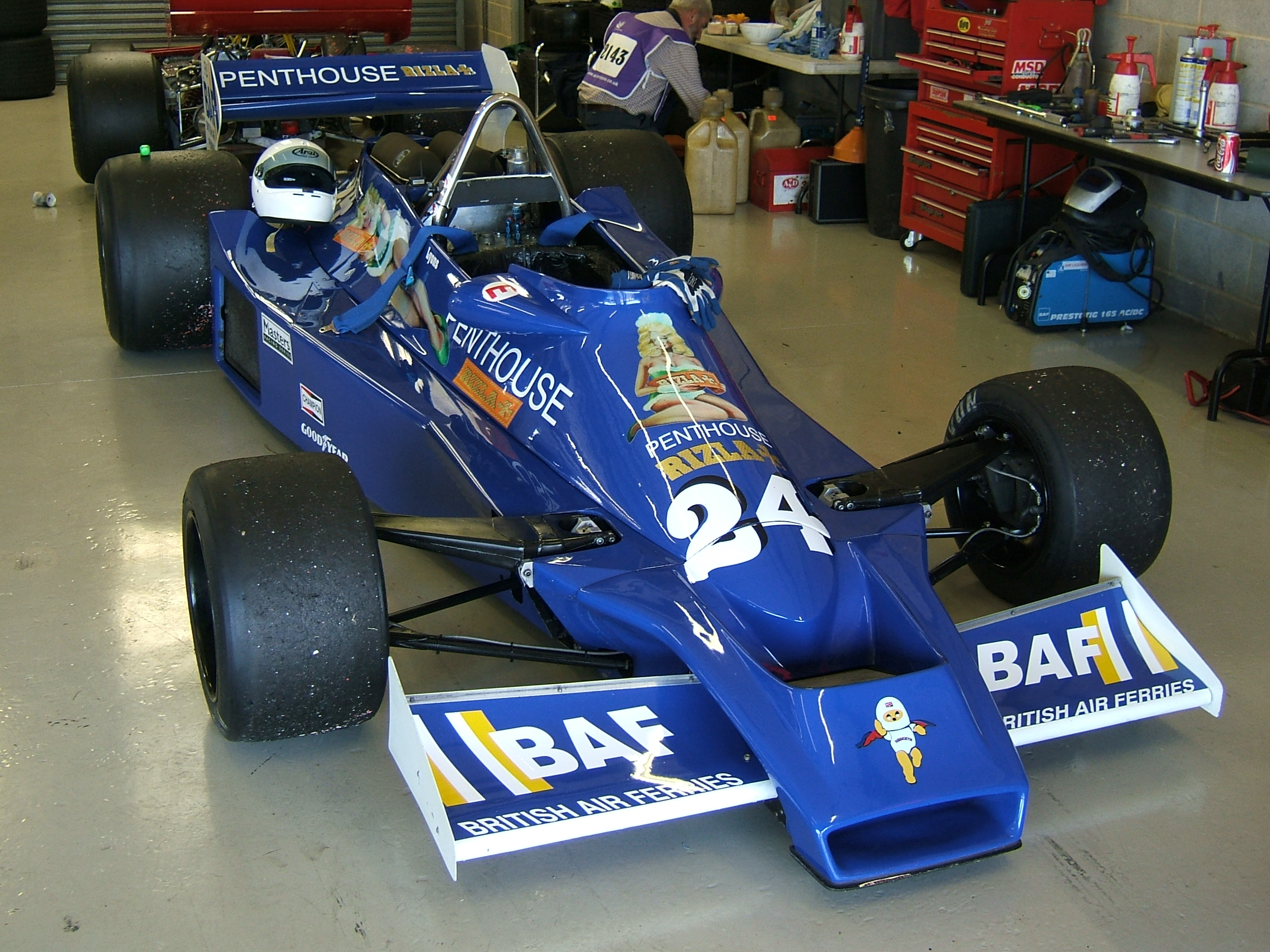
A Hesketh 308E, seen in 1977's Penthouse Rizla Racing livery.

== Complete Formula One World Championship results ==
(key) (Results in bold indicate pole position; results in italics indicate fastest lap.)

| Year | Entrants | Engines | Tyres | Drivers | 1 | 2 | 3 | 4 | 5 | 6 | 7 | 8 | 9 | 10 | 11 | 12 | 13 | 14 | 15 | 16 | 17 | Points | WCC |
|---|---|---|---|---|---|---|---|---|---|---|---|---|---|---|---|---|---|---|---|---|---|---|---|
| 1977 | Penthouse Rizla Racing | Ford V8 | G | | ARG | BRA | RSA | USW | ESP | MON | BEL | SWE | FRA | GBR | GER | AUT | NED | ITA | USA | CAN | JPN | 0 | - |
| 1977 | Penthouse Rizla Racing | Ford V8 | G | Rupert Keegan | | | | | Ret | 12 | Ret | 13 | 10 | Ret | Ret | 7 | Ret | 9 | 8 | Ret | | 0 | - |
| 1977 | Hesketh Racing | Ford V8 | G | Harald Ertl | | | | | Ret | DNQ | 9 | 16 | DNQ | | | | | | | | | 0 | - |
| 1977 | Hesketh Racing | Ford V8 | G | Héctor Rebaque | | | | | | | DNQ | DNQ | DNQ | | Ret | DNQ | DNQ | | | | | 0 | - |
| 1977 | Hesketh Racing | Ford V8 | G | Ian Ashley | | | | | | | | | | | | DNQ | DNQ | DNQ | 17 | DNS | | 0 | - |
| 1978 | Olympus Cameras/Hesketh Racing | Ford V8 | G | | ARG | BRA | RSA | USW | MON | BEL | ESP | SWE | FRA | GBR | GER | AUT | NED | ITA | USA | CAN | | 0 | **NC** |
| 1978 | Olympus Cameras/Hesketh Racing | Ford V8 | G | Divina Galica | DNQ | DNQ | | | | | | | | | | | | | | | | 0 | **NC** |
| 1978 | Olympus Cameras/Hesketh Racing | Ford V8 | G | Eddie Cheever | | | Ret | | | | | | | | | | | | | | | 0 | **NC** |
| 1978 | Olympus Cameras/Hesketh Racing | Ford V8 | G | Derek Daly | | | | DNPQ | DNPQ | DNQ | | | | | | | | | | | | 0 | **NC** |
