= Bernard de Dryver =

Belgian racing driver (born 1952)

- Born: 19 September 1952 (age 74); Brussels, Belgium

Formula One World Championship career
- Nationality: (Belgium) Belgian
- Active years: 1977 – 1978
- Team(s): non-works March, Ensign
- Entries: 2 (0 starts)
- Championships: 0
- Wins: 0
- Podiums: 0
- Career points: 0
- Pole positions: 0
- Fastest laps: 0
- First entry: 1977 Belgian Grand Prix
- Last entry: 1978 Belgian Grand Prix

British Formula One Championship career
- Active years: 1979
- Entries: 15 (14 starts)
- Championships: 0
- Wins: 0
- Podiums: 4
- Career points: 41
- Pole positions: 1
- Fastest laps: 0

Championship titles
- 1997: SuperSport Trophy

Bernard de Dryver (French pronunciation: [bɛʁ.naʁ də dʁi.ve]; born 19 September 1952) is a racing driver from Belgium. He was born in Brussels. He entered two World Championship Formula One Grands Prix, the Belgian Grand Prix in 1977 and 1978. In 1977, he entered a non-works March, but failed to make the grid. The following year, he entered a privately run Ensign but his sponsorship fell through and he did not practice.

De Dryver raced a full season in the Aurora UK Formula One Championship in 1979, driving a Fittipaldi, scoring a number of podiums and finishing fourth in the championship.

De Dryver is still involved in motor sport, most recently in GT Racing.

== Racing record ==
=== Complete European Formula Two Championship results ===
(key) (Races in bold indicate pole position; races in italics indicate fastest lap)

Year	Entrant	Chassis	Engine	1	2	3	4	5	6	7	8	9	10	11	12	13	14	Pos	Pts
1975	Bang & OLufsen Team Michel Vaillant	March/752	BMW	EST	THR; Ret	HOC; DNQ	NÜR; Ret	PAU; DNQ	HOC; DNQ	SAL; 17	ROU; 5	MUG; 6	PER; 9	SIL; 17	ZOL; 12	NOG; 9	VLL; DNQ	22nd	3
1976	Bang & OLufsen Team Michel Vaillant	March/742	BMW	HOC; DNQ	THR; 13	VLL; DNQ	SAL; DNQ	PAU; DNQ	HOC	ROU; DNQ	MUG	PER	EST	NOG	HOC; DNQ			NC	0
1977	Bill Gubelman & Bob Gerard	March/772	Hart	SIL; DNS	THR; Ret													20th	1
1977	Bill Gubelman & Bob Gerard	March/762	BMW			HOC; 10												20th	1
1977	Bill Gubelman & Bob Gerard	March/778	BMW				NÜR; NC	VLL; 9	PAU; DNQ	MUG; 6	ROU; 11	NOG; Ret	PER	MIS; Ret	EST; Ret	DON; 16		20th	1
1978	Bob Salisbury Racing	March/782	BMW	THR; Ret	HOC; 13	NÜR; Ret	PAU; DNQ	MUG; Ret	VLL; DNQ	ROU; Ret	DON	NOG; DNQ	PER; Ret	MIS; DNQ	HOC			NC	0
1979	RAM Racing/Bob Salisbury Racing	Chevron/B48	BMW	SIL	HOC; Ret	THR	NÜR; 16	VLL	MUG	PAU	HOC	ZAN	PER	MIS	DON			NC	0

=== Complete Formula One World Championship results ===
(key) (Races in bold indicate pole position; races in italics indicate fastest lap)

Year	Entrant	Chassis	Engine	1	2	3	4	5	6	7	8	9	10	11	12	13	14	15	16	17	WDC	Points
1977	British Formula One Racing Team	March 761	Cosworth V8	ARG	BRA	RSA	USW	ESP	MON	BEL; DNQ	SWE	FRA	GBR	GER	AUT	NED	ITA	USA	CAN	JPN	NC	0
1978	Team Tissot Ensign	Ensign N177	Cosworth V8	ARG	BRA	RSA	USW	MON	BEL; DNP	ESP	SWE	FRA	GBR	GER	AUT	NED	ITA	USA	CAN		NC	0

=== Complete Formula One non-championship results ===
(key) (Races in bold indicate pole position; races in italics indicate fastest lap)

Year	Entrant	Chassis	Engine	1	2	3
1979	RAM Racing	Fittipaldi F5A	Cosworth V8	ROC; 8	GUN	DIN

=== Complete British Formula One Championship results ===
(key) (Races in bold indicate pole position; races in italics indicate fastest lap)

Year	Entrant	Chassis	Engine	1	2	3	4	5	6	7	8	9	10	11	12	13	14	15	Pos.	Points
1979	Mopar Ultramar Racing Team	Fittipaldi F5A	Ford Cosworth DFV 3.0 V8	ZOL; 5	OUL; Ret	BRH; 2	**MAL**; Ret	SNE; 4	THR; DNS	ZAN; 6	DON; 3	OUL; 2	NOG; 2	MAL; Ret	BRH; 4	THR; 4	SNE; 5	SIL; 4	4th	41

=== Complete International Formula 3000 results ===
(key) (Races in bold indicate pole position; races in italics indicate fastest lap.)

Year	Entrant	1	2	3	4	5	6	7	8	9	10	11	DC	Points
1988	Sport Auto Racing	JER	VAL	PAU	SIL	MNZ	PER	BRH	BIR	BUG	ZOL; DNQ	DIJ	NC	0

=== Complete 24 Hours of Le Mans results ===
Year	Team	Co-Drivers	Car	Class	Laps	Pos.	Class Pos.
1979	(Belgium) ”Beurlys”	(United Kingdom) Nick Faure (United Kingdom) Steve O'Rourke (Belgium) "Beurlys" (Jean Blaton)	Ferrari 512 BB	IMSA+2.5	274	12th	5th
1982	(France) C. Bussi	(France) Christian Bussi (Belgium) Pascal Witmeur	Rondeau M382	C	279	15th	6th
1983	(France) Primagaz	(France) Lucien Guitteny (France) Pierre Yver	Rondeau M382	C	266	DSQ	DSQ
1984	(France) Primagaz	(France) Pierre-François Rousselot (France) Pierre Yver	Rondeau M382	C1	155	DNF	DNF
1987	(France) Primagaz Competition	(Germany) Jürgen Lässig (France) Pierre Yver	Porsche 962C	C1	335	**2nd**	**2nd**
1988	(France) N. del Bello	(France) Noël del Bello (Switzerland) Bernard Santal	Sauber C8	C1	157	DNF	DNF
1989	(France) Courage Compétition	(France) Patrick Gonin (Switzerland) Bernard Santal	Cougar C22	C1	168	DNF	DNF
1990	(Germany) Porsche Kremer Racing	(France) Patrick Gonin (France) Philippe Alliot	Porsche 962CK6	C1	319	16th	16th

=== Complete British GT Championship results ===
(key) (Races in bold indicate pole position) (Races in italics indicate fastest lap)

Year	Team	Car	Class	1	2	3	4	5	6	7	8	9	10	11	12	Pos	Points
2000	Marcos Racing International	Marcos Mantara LM600	GT	THR; 12	CRO	OUL	DON	SIL	BRH	DON	CRO	SIL	SNE	SPA	SIL	37th	6
