= Mikko Kozarowitzky =

Finnish racing driver (born 1948)

- Born: 17 May 1948 (age 78); Helsinki, Finland

Formula One World Championship career
- Nationality: (Finland) Finnish
- Active years: 1977
- Team: RAM
- Entries: 2 (0 starts)
- Championships: 0
- Wins: 0
- Podiums: 0
- Career points: 0
- Pole positions: 0
- Fastest laps: 0
- First entry: 1977 Swedish Grand Prix
- Last entry: 1977 British Grand Prix

Championship titles
- 1975: Formula Super Vee – Gold Cup

Michael "Mikko" Kozarowitzky (born 17 May 1948) is a Finnish former racing driver. With a solid background in various lower formulae, he reached Formula One in 1977. Driving for the RAM team, which was then running March 761 cars, Kozarowitzky entered the 1977 Swedish Grand Prix, where he failed to qualify mainly thanks to a lack of testing time in the car.

Kozarowitsky's next attempt was at the 1977 British Grand Prix where he failed to pre-qualify following an accident avoiding Rupert Keegan during practice. Kozarowitzky broke his hand in the accident and left the team after they wanted him to try to qualify in the spare car despite his injury. His Formula One plans for 1978 came to nothing due to lack of funds, and he then retired from the sport.

== Complete Formula One results ==
(key) (Races in bold indicate pole position; races in italics indicate fastest lap)

Year	Entrant	Chassis	Engine	1	2	3	4	5	6	7	8	9	10	11	12	13	14	15	16	17	WDC	Points
1977	F&S Properties with Marlboro	March 761	Cosworth V8	ARG	BRA	RSA	USW	ESP	MON	BEL	SWE; DNQ	FRA	GBR; DNPQ	GER	AUT	NED	ITA	USA	CAN	JPN	NC	0
