= March 761 =

Formula One car

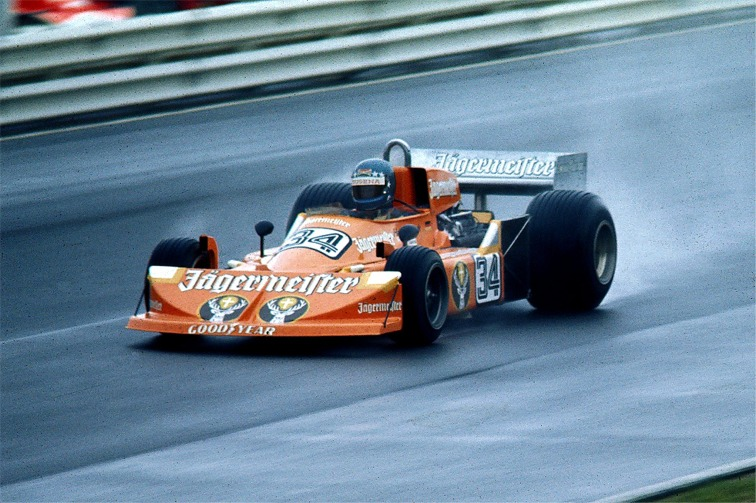
- Category: Formula One
- Constructor: March Engineering
- Designer: Robin Herd
- Predecessor: March 751
- Successor: March 771

Technical specifications
- Chassis: Aluminium monocoque
- Axle track: 1,524 mm (60.0 in) (Front); 1,524 mm (60.0 in) (Rear)
- Wheelbase: 2,438 mm (96.0 in)
- Engine: Ford-Cosworth DFV 2,993 cc (182.6 cu in) 90° V8 naturally aspirated mid-mounted
- Transmission: 1976: Hewland DG 400 6-speed manual. 1977: Hewland FGA 400 6-speed manual.
- Tyres: Goodyear

Competition history
- Notable entrants: March Engineering
- Debut: 1976 Brazilian Grand Prix
Races	Wins	Poles	F/Laps
33	1	1	1
- Constructors' Championships: 0
- Drivers' Championships: 0

The March 761 was a Formula One racing car designed by Robin Herd of March Engineering for the 1976 season which saw continued use in 1977. The 761 was not a new design, in fact the initial three cars were built up from the 751s which survived the 1975 season. Ronnie Peterson qualified on pole at the Dutch Grand Prix, and set fastest lap at, and won, the Italian Grand Prix.

== History ==
In 1976, Ronnie Peterson was unhappy with the uncompetitive Lotus 77, and returned to March for whom he scored the team's second and last win at Monza. The 761 was fast but fragile and by this point the F1 effort was being run on a shoestring with a two-car 'works' effort featuring Peterson and Hans-Joachim Stuck, the cars tending to turn up in different liveries as race-by-race sponsorship deals were signed, and a 'B-team' entered under the March Engines banner for paying drivers Lella Lombardi and Arturo Merzario. By now the F1 effort as a whole was under fairly severe pressure from BMW, which wanted Robin Herd to concentrate entirely on the works' Formula Two effort, which was starting to be outpaced by French constructors (Martini and Elf) and the new Ralt marque.

That year, Peterson scored only one other point before being brokered back into a deal with Tyrrell for 1977. Although he felt most at home at March, it was clear that the team didn't have the resources to do Formula One "properly".

For 1977, the works cars were upgraded and referred to as 761B. A token F1 effort with Rothmans sponsorship was run in 1977 for Alex Ribeiro and Ian Scheckter, but nothing worthwhile was achieved. Yet, as the works were fading from F1 the 761, by virtue of being cheap, simple and readily available, became the tool of choice for privateers, notably Frank Williams who after his acrimonious split with Walter Wolf needed a car to get back into racing before his own vehicle was ready.

Merzario later built his own unsuccessful F1 car based on his old 761, which he and Simon Hadfield attempted to develop into a ground effect car. This programme was completely unsuccessful.

At the end of the 1977 season, the F1 team's assets and FOCA membership were sold to ATS (who had bought the Penske cars); Herd was retained by them as a consultant and was hence in the curious position of developing a development of his own 1975 car - and the 1978 ATS had some features reminiscent of contemporary March thinking. Mosley left the company to concentrate on FOCA matters.

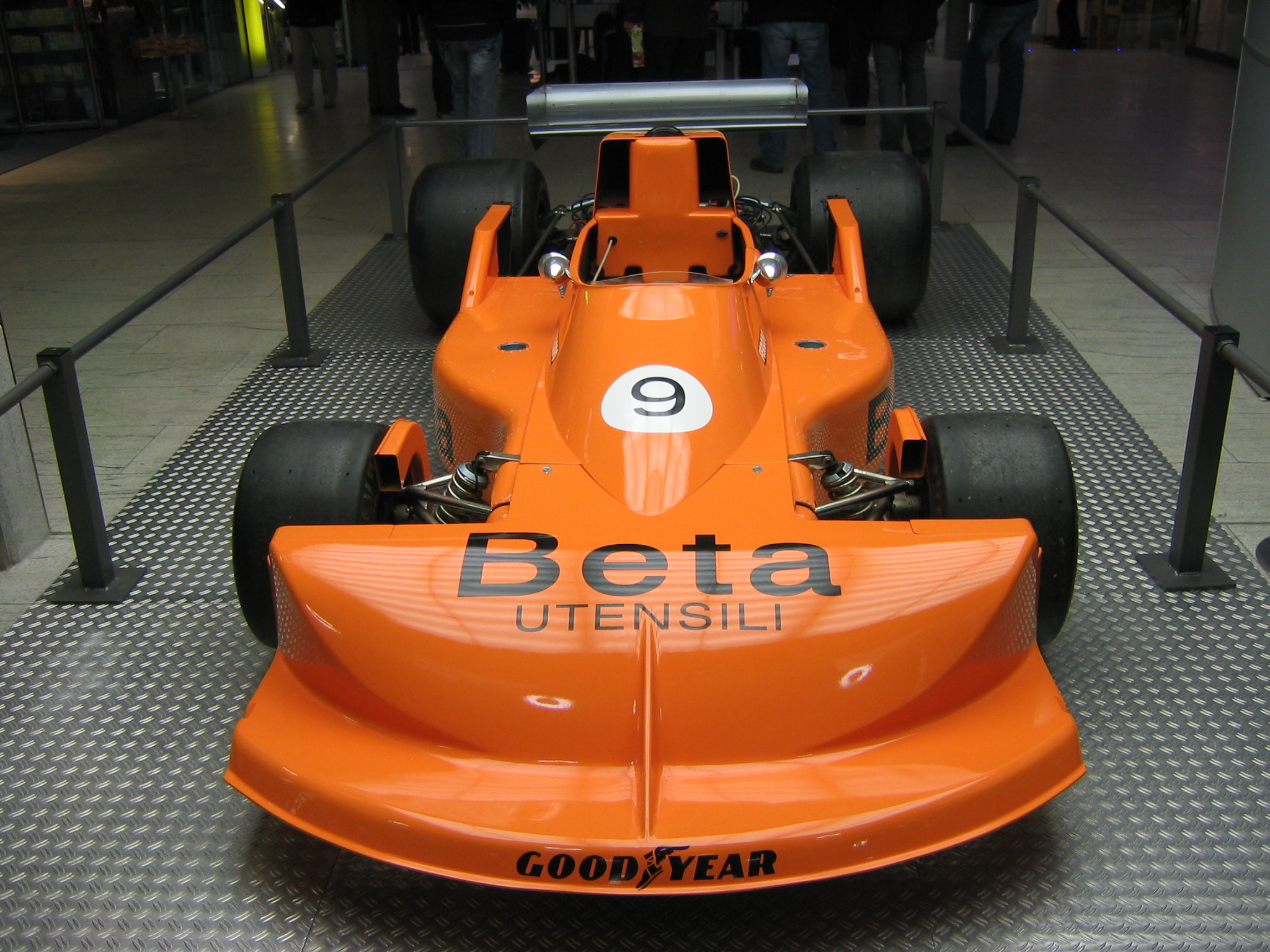
March 761 front-view

== Complete Formula One World Championship results ==
(key) (results in bold indicate pole position; results in italics indicate fastest lap)

Year	Entrant	Engine	Tyres	Drivers	1	2	3	4	5	6	7	8	9	10	11	12	13	14	15	16	17	Points	WCC
1976	March Engineering	Ford Cosworth DFV 3.0 V8	G		BRA	RSA	USW	ESP	BEL	MON	SWE	FRA	GBR	GER	AUT	NED	ITA	CAN	USA	JPN		19	7th
1976	March Engineering	Ford Cosworth DFV 3.0 V8	G	(Sweden) Ronnie Peterson		Ret		Ret	Ret	Ret	7	19	Ret	Ret	6	**Ret**	1	9	Ret	Ret		19	7th
1976	Theodore Racing	Ford Cosworth DFV 3.0 V8	G	(Sweden) Ronnie Peterson			10															19	7th
1976	Theodore Racing	Ford Cosworth DFV 3.0 V8	G	(Germany) Hans-Joachim Stuck			Ret															19	7th
1976	March Racing	Ford Cosworth DFV 3.0 V8	G	(Germany) Hans-Joachim Stuck	4	12		Ret	Ret	4	Ret	7	Ret	Ret	Ret	Ret	Ret	Ret	5	Ret		19	7th
1976	Beta Team March	Ford Cosworth DFV 3.0 V8	G	(Italy) Vittorio Brambilla	Ret	8	Ret	Ret	Ret	Ret	10	Ret	Ret	Ret	Ret	6	7	14	Ret	Ret		19	7th
1976	Lavazza March	Ford Cosworth DFV 3.0 V8	G	(Italy) Lella Lombardi	14																	19	7th
1976	Ovoro March	Ford Cosworth DFV 3.0 V8	G	(Italy) Arturo Merzario			DNQ	Ret	Ret	DNQ	14	9	Ret									19	7th
1977	Hollywood March Racing	Ford Cosworth DFV 3.0 V8	G		ARG	BRA	RSA	USW	ESP	MON	BEL	SWE	FRA	GBR	GER	AUT	NED	ITA	USA	CAN	JPN	0	20th
1977	Hollywood March Racing	Ford Cosworth DFV 3.0 V8	G	(Brazil) Alex Ribeiro	Ret	Ret	Ret	Ret	DNQ	DNQ	DNQ	DNQ	DNQ	DNQ	8	DNQ	11	DNQ	15	8	12	0	20th
1977	Team Rothmans International	Ford Cosworth DFV 3.0 V8	G	(South Africa) Ian Scheckter	Ret	Ret			11	DNQ	Ret	Ret	NC	Ret	Ret	Ret						0	20th
1977	Team Rothmans International	Ford Cosworth DFV 3.0 V8	G	(Germany) Hans-Joachim Stuck			Ret															0	20th
1977	Team Rothmans International	Ford Cosworth DFV 3.0 V8	G	(United Kingdom) Brian Henton				10														0	20th
1977	British Formula One Racing Team	Ford Cosworth DFV 3.0 V8	G	(United Kingdom) Brian Henton					DNQ					DNQ		DNQ						0	20th
1977	British Formula One Racing Team	Ford Cosworth DFV 3.0 V8	G	(Belgium) Bernard de Dryver							DNQ											0	20th
1977	Chesterfield Racing	Ford Cosworth DFV 3.0 V8	G	(United States) Brett Lunger			14	Ret	10													0	20th
1977	RAM Racing	Ford Cosworth DFV 3.0 V8	G	(Netherlands) Boy Hayje			Ret		DNQ	DNQ	NC	DNQ					DNQ					0	20th
1977	RAM Racing	Ford Cosworth DFV 3.0 V8	G	(Finland) Mikko Kozarowitzky								DNQ		DNPQ								0	20th
1977	RAM Racing	Ford Cosworth DFV 3.0 V8	G	(United Kingdom) Andy Sutcliffe										DNPQ								0	20th
1977	RAM Racing	Ford Cosworth DFV 3.0 V8	G	(Netherlands) Michael Bleekemolen													DNQ					0	20th
1977	Williams Grand Prix Engineering	Ford Cosworth DFV 3.0 V8	G	(Belgium) Patrick Nève					12		10	15	DNQ	10	DNQ	9	DNQ	7	18	Ret		0	20th
1977	Team Merzario	Ford Cosworth DFV 3.0 V8	G	(Italy) Arturo Merzario					Ret	DNQ	14		Ret	Ret	DNQ		DNQ					0	20th
