= British Formula One Racing Team =

- Formation: 1977; 49 years ago
- Founder: Brian Henton

British Formula One Racing Team was a Formula One team run by Brian Henton in 1977. Henton, a racing driver who had been competing in Formula One and Two, set up his own team to compete regularly in Formula One. The team purchased a March 761B from March Engineering together with a Cosworth DFV engine, to compete in selected World Championship and Shellsport International Series races. Henton and Bernard de Dryver entered four World Championship races, but failed to qualify for any. The team later shut down through lack of funds.

== Complete Formula One World Championship results ==
(key) (results in bold indicate pole position; results in italics indicate fastest lap)

Year	Chassis	Engine(s)	Tyres	Drivers	1	2	3	4	5	6	7	8	9	10	11	12	13	14	15	16	17
1977	March 761; March 761B	Ford Cosworth DFV 3.0 V8	**G**		ARG	BRA	RSA	USW	ESP	MON	BEL	SWE	FRA	GBR	GER	AUT	NED	ITA	USA	CAN	JPN
1977	March 761; March 761B	Ford Cosworth DFV 3.0 V8	**G**	(United Kingdom) Brian Henton					DNQ					DNQ		DNQ					
1977	March 761; March 761B	Ford Cosworth DFV 3.0 V8	**G**	(Belgium) Bernard de Dryver							DNQ										

== Complete Formula One Non-Championship results ==
(key) (results in bold indicate pole position; results in italics indicate fastest lap)

Year	Chassis	Engine(s)	Tyres	Drivers	1
1977	March 761	Ford Cosworth DFV 3.0 V8	**G**		ROC
1977	March 761	Ford Cosworth DFV 3.0 V8	**G**	(United Kingdom) Brian Henton	4
