= 1977 Race of Champions =

- Non-championship race in the 1977 Formula One season

Race details
- Date: 20 March 1977
- Official name: XII Race of Champions
- Location: Brands Hatch Grand Prix Circuit, Fawkham, Kent, England
- Course: Permanent racing facility
- Course length: 4.206 km (2.6136 miles)
- Distance: 40 laps, 168.24 km (104.544 miles)

Pole position
Driver	(United Kingdom) John Watson	Brabham-Alfa Romeo
- Time: 1:19.05

Fastest lap
Driver	(United Kingdom) James Hunt	McLaren-Cosworth
- Time: 1:19.48

Podium
First	(United Kingdom) James Hunt	McLaren-Cosworth
Second	(South Africa) Jody Scheckter	Wolf-Cosworth
Third	(United Kingdom) John Watson	Brabham-Alfa Romeo

The XII Race of Champions was a non-championship Formula One race held at Brands Hatch on 20 March 1977. The 40-lap race was won by Englishman James Hunt, driving a McLaren-Cosworth, who also set the fastest lap. South African Jody Scheckter finished second in a Wolf-Cosworth, while Northern Irishman John Watson finished third in a Brabham-Alfa Romeo, having started from pole position.

== Qualifying classification ==
Pos.	No.	Driver	Constructor	Car	Time	Gap
1	7	(United Kingdom) John Watson	Brabham-Alfa Romeo	Brabham BT45	1:19.05	
2	5	(United States) Mario Andretti	Lotus-Cosworth	Lotus 78	1:19.39	+0.34
3	1	(United Kingdom) James Hunt	McLaren-Cosworth	McLaren M23	1:19.60	+0.55
4	20	(South Africa) Jody Scheckter	Wolf-Cosworth	Wolf WR3	1:20.18	+1.13
5	3	(Sweden) Ronnie Peterson	Tyrrell-Cosworth	Tyrrell P34	1:20.33	+1.28
6	22	(Switzerland) Clay Regazzoni	Ensign-Cosworth	Ensign N177	1:21.82	+2.77
7	16	(United Kingdom) Jackie Oliver	Shadow-Cosworth	Shadow DN8	1:21.88	+2.83
8	36	(United Kingdom) Tony Trimmer	Surtees-Cosworth	Surtees TS19	1:22.51	+3.46
9	24	(United Kingdom) Rupert Keegan	Hesketh-Cosworth	Hesketh 308E	1:22.58	+3.53
10	38	(United Kingdom) Brian Henton	March-Cosworth	March 761	1:22.90	+3.85
11	37	(United Kingdom) Bob Evans	Penske-Cosworth	Penske PC3	1:23.17	+4.12
12	33	(Netherlands) Boy Hayje	March-Cosworth	March 761	1:23.71	+4.66
13	31	(United Kingdom) David Purley	LEC-Cosworth	LEC CRP/1	1:24.64	+5.59
14	14	(Australia) Larry Perkins	BRM	BRM P207	1:25.14	+6.09
15	13	(United Kingdom) Divina Galica	Surtees-Cosworth	Surtees TS19	1:26.09	+7.04
16	9	(Brazil) Alex Ribeiro	March-Cosworth	March 761B	1:27.47	+8.42
17	18	(Italy) Vittorio Brambilla	Surtees-Cosworth	Surtees TS19	1:29.15	+10.10

== Race classification ==
Pos.	No.	Driver	Entrant	Constructor	Laps	Time/Retired	Grid
1	1	(United Kingdom) James Hunt	Marlboro Team McLaren	McLaren-Cosworth	40	53:54.35	3
2	20	(South Africa) Jody Scheckter	Walter Wolf Racing	Wolf-Cosworth	40	+ 23.50	4
3	7	(United Kingdom) John Watson	Martini Racing	Brabham-Alfa Romeo	40	+ 1:18.60	1
4	38	(United Kingdom) Brian Henton	British Formula One Racing Team	March-Cosworth	39	+ 1 lap	10
5	16	(United Kingdom) Jackie Oliver	Shadow Racing Team	Shadow-Cosworth	39	+ 1 lap	7
6	31	(United Kingdom) David Purley	LEC Refrigeration Racing	LEC-Cosworth	39	+ 1 lap	13
7	33	(Netherlands) Boy Hayje	F&S Properties/RAM Racing	March-Cosworth	39	+ 1 lap	12
8	24	(United Kingdom) Rupert Keegan	Penthouse Rizla Racing	Hesketh-Cosworth	39	+ 1 lap	9
9	36	(United Kingdom) Tony Trimmer	Melchester Racing	Surtees-Cosworth	38	+ 2 laps	8
10	3	(Sweden) Ronnie Peterson	Elf Team Tyrrell	Tyrrell-Cosworth	37	Engine	5
11	37	(United Kingdom) Bob Evans	Hexagon Racing	Penske-Cosworth	37	+ 3 laps	11
12	13	(United Kingdom) Divina Galica	Shell Sport	Surtees-Cosworth	37	+ 3 laps	15
13	22	(Switzerland) Clay Regazzoni	Team Tissot Ensign with Castrol	Ensign-Cosworth	36	+ 4 laps	6
Ret	5	(United States) Mario Andretti	John Player Team Lotus	Lotus-Cosworth	34	Electrical	2
Ret	9	(Brazil) Alex Ribeiro	Hollywood March Racing	March-Cosworth	18	Ignition	16
Ret	18	(Italy) Vittorio Brambilla	Durex Team Surtees	Surtees-Cosworth	12	Electrical	17
DNS	14	(Australia) Larry Perkins	Rotary Watches/Stanley BRM	BRM		Concerns over car's safety	14

Previous race: 1976 BRDC International Trophy	Formula One non-championship races 1977 season	Next race: 1978 BRDC International Trophy
Previous race: 1976 Race of Champions	Race of Champions	Next race: 1979 Race of Champions
