= RAM Racing =

Defunct auto racing team

RAM
- Full name: RAM Racing Team
- Base: United Kingdom
- Founder(s): Mike Ralph, John Macdonald
- Noted drivers: (Germany) Manfred Winkelhock (United Kingdom) Jonathan Palmer (France) Philippe Alliot (United Kingdom) Kenny Acheson (Chile) Eliseo Salazar (New Zealand) Mike Thackwell (France) Jean-Louis Schlesser (Canada) Jacques Villeneuve, Sr. (Italy) Lella Lombardi

Formula One World Championship career
- First entry: 1976 Spanish Grand Prix
- Races entered: 65 (41 starts)
- Constructors: Williams-Ford; March-Ford; Brabham-Ford; RAM-Ford; RAM-Hart
- Drivers' Championships: 0
- Race victories: 0 (best finish: 8th, 1984 Brazilian Grand Prix)
- Pole positions: 0
- Fastest laps: 0
- Final entry: 1985 European Grand Prix

RAM as a Formula One chassis constructor
Formula One World Championship career
- Entrants: RAM Racing Team
- First entry: 1983 Brazilian Grand Prix
- Last entry: 1985 European Grand Prix
- Races entered: 44
- Race victories: 0
- Constructors' Championships: 0
- Drivers' Championships: 0
- Pole positions: 0
- Fastest laps: 0

RAM Racing was a British Formula One racing team which competed during the racing seasons of 1976 to 1985. The team entered other manufacturers' chassis from 1976 to 1980, then ran March's team from 1981 to 1983, only entering a car entirely their own in 1984 and 1985. They scored no championship points.

== History ==
The team was formed in 1975 by Mike Ralph and John Macdonald, with RAM derived from their names. After running Macdonald in a GRD in British Formula Three, they entered Alan Jones in a Formula 5000 March for 1976. They also bought a pair of Brabham BT44B Formula One cars, and entered the 1976 World Championship, running Loris Kessel and Emilio de Villota for the Spanish Grand Prix, where neither qualified. However, both Kessel and another pay-driver, Patrick Nève, qualified for the Belgian Grand Prix, with Jac Nellemann, Damien Magee, Lella Lombardi and Bob Evans all making appearances in the cars. There were few finishes, and the pay-drivers meant the team were frequent non-qualifiers.

For 1977, Boy Hayje drove a RAM-entered March with little success, and a second "rent-a-car" did no better later in the year when driven by Andy Sutcliffe, Mikko Kozarowitzky or Michael Bleekemolen. However, they had some success running Guy Edwards in the Shellsport Group 8 Championship in Britain, finishing 2nd overall.

For 1978 the team switched to the British Aurora Formula One series, with Edwards placing 4th overall that year in a March, and 5th overall the following season in a Fittipaldi F5A. For 1980, RAM made an investment in a pair of 1979-spec Williams FW07s, with Emilio de Villota winning the title. Sponsorship included American men's magazine Penthouse. They then entered one of these cars for Rupert Keegan in the British Grand Prix. Kevin Cogan and Geoff Lees would guest in another car in the last two rounds, but their best finish was Keegan's 9th place at the United States Grand Prix.

1981 saw RAM manage and run the returning March Grand Prix team, with Derek Daly and Eliseo Salazar driving. However, non-qualifications were frequent, and the team failed to score any points, Daly's 7th place at the British Grand Prix being their best result.

The combination stayed together for 1982, landing backing from Rothmans, and the new March 821 saw design work from a young Adrian Reynard. With veteran Jochen Mass to lead the team, backed up by Raul Boesel, hopes were high, but it was another disappointing year. Mass took 7th place at the Detroit Grand Prix, but as the car proved to be slow he lost motivation, and focused more on sports car racing with Porsche. From the German Grand Prix, Keegan took over the car, but RAM March once again failed to score points.

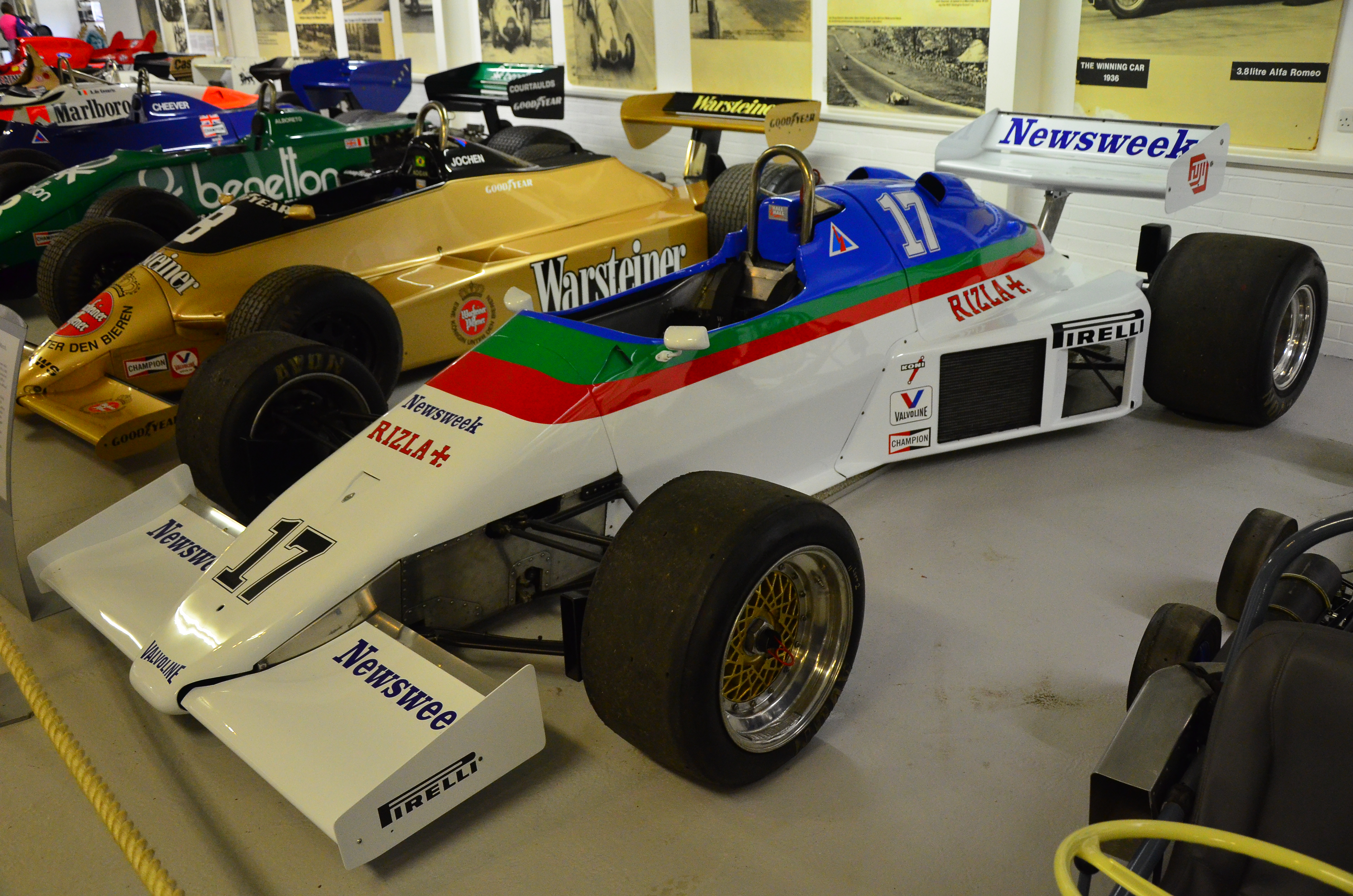
The RAM March 01.

1983 saw the RAM name make itself onto the chassis for the first time, with Dave Kelly's RAM March 01 design. Salazar returned to drive the main entry, while a second car for Jean-Louis Schlesser was fielded at the French Grand Prix as a one-off. Salazar scored a 15th place in the season opener, but the bulky car struggled to qualify. Financial reasons saw the team skip the Detroit Grand Prix, while they only made the Canadian Grand Prix due to fielding local driver Jacques Villeneuve, Sr. and attracting some Canadian sponsorship. Kenny Acheson then took over for the rest of the season, only qualifying once, at the season-closing South African Grand Prix, where he took the team's best result of the year, 12th and last.

Astonishingly, the team pressed on into 1984. The partnership with March was dissolved, and RAM attracted sponsorship from Skoal Bandit. Two RAM 02 cars, with Hart turbo engines, were entered for Formula Two champion Jonathan Palmer and Philippe Alliot. Kelly's new design was disappointing, and the cars were frequent back-markers, and Palmer's 8th place in the opening Brazilian Grand Prix was their best result of the year (and of all time). Indeed, the team drew more notices for the crashes their drivers were involved in.

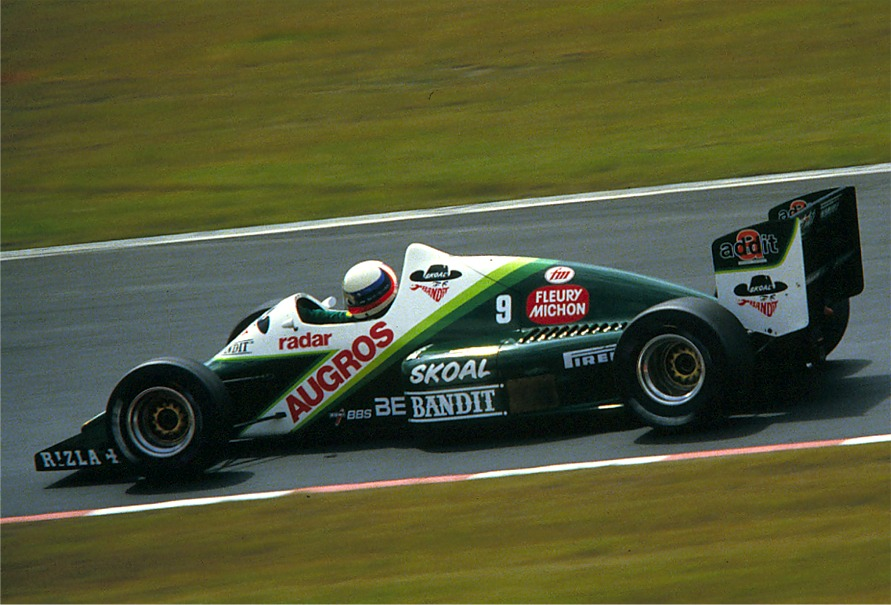
Manfred Winkelhock driving for RAM at the 1985 German Grand Prix.

Alliot remained for 1985, with Manfred Winkelhock entered in the second car, and a new RAM 03 designed by Gustav Brunner. Winkelhock put in some improved qualifying performances, but actual results were still thin. Winkelhock's death in a sports car event in Canada in the summer was a blow to the team, and Acheson was recalled briefly, before the team slimmed down to a single entry. They missed the final two rounds altogether. Skoal withdrew their backing at the end of the year, the team's best result having been Alliot's 9th place, again at the opening Brazilian Grand Prix.

The team planned to enter a single updated RAM 03 for Mike Thackwell (who had stood in for Palmer at the 1984 Canadian Grand Prix) for the 1986 season, but the funds could not be found, and the team folded early in 1986. The team would have raced as car #9 for 1986 otherwise, per the FIA entry list.

== Complete Formula One results ==
| Year | Chassis | Engine(s) | Tyres | Drivers | 1 | 2 | 3 | 4 | 5 | 6 | 7 | 8 | 9 | 10 | 11 | 12 | 13 | 14 | 15 | 16 | 17 | Pts | WCC |
|---|---|---|---|---|---|---|---|---|---|---|---|---|---|---|---|---|---|---|---|---|---|---|---|
| 1976 | Brabham BT44B | Ford Cosworth DFV 3.0 V8 | G | | BRA | RSA | USW | ESP | BEL | MON | SWE | FRA | GBR | GER | AUT | NED | ITA | CAN | USA | JPN | | —N/a^{1} | |
| 1976 | Brabham BT44B | Ford Cosworth DFV 3.0 V8 | G | (Switzerland) Loris Kessel | | | | DNQ | 12 | | Ret | DNQ | | | NC | | | | | | | —N/a^{1} | |
| 1976 | Brabham BT44B | Ford Cosworth DFV 3.0 V8 | G | (Spain) Emilio de Villota | | | | DNQ | | | | | | | | | | | | | | —N/a^{1} | |
| 1976 | Brabham BT44B | Ford Cosworth DFV 3.0 V8 | G | (Belgium) Patrick Nève | | | | | Ret | | | | | | | | | | | | | —N/a^{1} | |
| 1976 | Brabham BT44B | Ford Cosworth DFV 3.0 V8 | G | (Denmark) Jac Nellemann | | | | | | | DNQ | | | | | | | | | | | —N/a^{1} | |
| 1976 | Brabham BT44B | Ford Cosworth DFV 3.0 V8 | G | (United Kingdom) Damien Magee | | | | | | | | DNQ | | | | | | | | | | —N/a^{1} | |
| 1976 | Brabham BT44B | Ford Cosworth DFV 3.0 V8 | G | (United Kingdom) Bob Evans | | | | | | | | | Ret | | | | | | | | | —N/a^{1} | |
| 1976 | Brabham BT44B | Ford Cosworth DFV 3.0 V8 | G | (Italy) Lella Lombardi | | | | | | | | | DNQ | DNQ | 12 | | | | | | | —N/a^{1} | |
| 1976 | Brabham BT44B | Ford Cosworth DFV 3.0 V8 | G | (West Germany) Rolf Stommelen | | | | | | | | | | DNS | | | | | | | | —N/a^{1} | |
| 1977 | March 761 | Ford Cosworth DFV 3.0 V8 | G | | ARG | BRA | RSA | USW | ESP | MON | BEL | SWE | FRA | GBR | GER | AUT | NED | ITA | USA | CAN | JPN | —N/a^{1} | |
| 1977 | March 761 | Ford Cosworth DFV 3.0 V8 | G | (Netherlands) Boy Hayje | | | Ret | | DNQ | DNQ | NC | DNQ | | | | | DNQ | | | | | —N/a^{1} | |
| 1977 | March 761 | Ford Cosworth DFV 3.0 V8 | G | (Finland) Mikko Kozarowitzky | | | | | | | | DNQ | | DNPQ | | | | | | | | —N/a^{1} | |
| 1977 | March 761 | Ford Cosworth DFV 3.0 V8 | G | (United Kingdom) Andy Sutcliffe | | | | | | | | | | DNPQ | | | | | | | | —N/a^{1} | |
| 1977 | March 761 | Ford Cosworth DFV 3.0 V8 | G | (Netherlands) Michael Bleekemolen | | | | | | | | | | | | | DNQ | | | | | —N/a^{1} | |
1978 – 1979: RAM Racing did not compete.
| 1980 | Williams FW07 | Ford Cosworth DFV 3.0 V8 | G | | ARG | BRA | RSA | USW | BEL | MON | FRA | GBR | GER | AUT | NED | ITA | CAN | USA | | | | —N/a^{1} | |
| 1980 | Williams FW07 | Ford Cosworth DFV 3.0 V8 | G | (United Kingdom) Rupert Keegan | | | | | | | | 11 | DNQ | 15 | DNQ | 11 | DNQ | 9 | | | | —N/a^{1} | |
| 1980 | Williams FW07 | Ford Cosworth DFV 3.0 V8 | G | (United States) Kevin Cogan | | | | | | | | | | | | | DNQ | | | | | —N/a^{1} | |
| 1980 | Williams FW07 | Ford Cosworth DFV 3.0 V8 | G | (United Kingdom) Geoff Lees | | | | | | | | | | | | | | DNQ | | | | —N/a^{1} | |
1981 – 1982: RAM Racing did not compete.
| 1983 | RAM 01 | Ford Cosworth DFV 3.0 V8; Ford Cosworth DFY 3.0 V8 | P | | BRA | USW | FRA | SMR | MON | BEL | DET | CAN | GBR | GER | AUT | NED | ITA | EUR | RSA | | | 0 | NC |
| 1983 | RAM 01 | Ford Cosworth DFV 3.0 V8; Ford Cosworth DFY 3.0 V8 | P | (Chile) Eliseo Salazar | 14 | Ret | DNQ | DNQ | DNQ | DNQ | | | | | | | | | | | | 0 | NC |
| 1983 | RAM 01 | Ford Cosworth DFV 3.0 V8; Ford Cosworth DFY 3.0 V8 | P | (Canada) Jacques Villeneuve, Sr. | | | | | | | | DNQ | | | | | | | | | | 0 | NC |
| 1983 | RAM 01 | Ford Cosworth DFV 3.0 V8; Ford Cosworth DFY 3.0 V8 | P | (United Kingdom) Kenny Acheson | | | | | | | | | DNQ | DNQ | DNQ | DNQ | DNQ | DNQ | 12 | | | 0 | NC |
| 1983 | RAM 01 | Ford Cosworth DFV 3.0 V8; Ford Cosworth DFY 3.0 V8 | P | (France) Jean-Louis Schlesser | | | DNQ | | | | | | | | | | | | | | | 0 | NC |
| 1984 | RAM 02; RAM 01 | Hart 415T 1.5 L4t | P | | BRA | RSA | BEL | SMR | FRA | MON | CAN | DET | DAL | GBR | GER | AUT | NED | ITA | EUR | POR | | 0 | NC |
| 1984 | RAM 02; RAM 01 | Hart 415T 1.5 L4t | P | (France) Philippe Alliot | Ret | Ret | DNQ | Ret | Ret | DNQ | 10 | Ret | DNS | Ret | Ret | 11 | 10 | Ret | Ret | Ret | | 0 | NC |
| 1984 | RAM 02; RAM 01 | Hart 415T 1.5 L4t | P | (United Kingdom) Jonathan Palmer | 8 | Ret | 10 | 9 | 13 | DNQ | | Ret | Ret | Ret | Ret | 9 | 9 | Ret | Ret | Ret | | 0 | NC |
| 1984 | RAM 02; RAM 01 | Hart 415T 1.5 L4t | P | (New Zealand) Mike Thackwell | | | | | | | Ret | | | | | | | | | | | 0 | NC |
| 1985 | RAM 03 | Hart 415T 1.5 L4t | P | | BRA | POR | SMR | MON | CAN | DET | FRA | GBR | GER | AUT | NED | ITA | BEL | EUR | RSA | AUS | | 0 | NC |
| 1985 | RAM 03 | Hart 415T 1.5 L4t | P | (France) Philippe Alliot | 9 | Ret | Ret | DNQ | Ret | Ret | Ret | Ret | Ret | Ret | Ret | Ret | Ret | Ret | | | | 0 | NC |
| 1985 | RAM 03 | Hart 415T 1.5 L4t | P | (Germany) Manfred Winkelhock | 13 | NC | Ret | DNQ | Ret | Ret | 12 | Ret | Ret | | | | | | | | | 0 | NC |
| 1985 | RAM 03 | Hart 415T 1.5 L4t | P | (United Kingdom) Kenny Acheson | | | | | | | | | | Ret | DNQ | Ret | | | | | | 0 | NC |

Notes

- ^1 – Not entered as a Constructor.
