= Brian Henton =

British racing driver (born 1946)

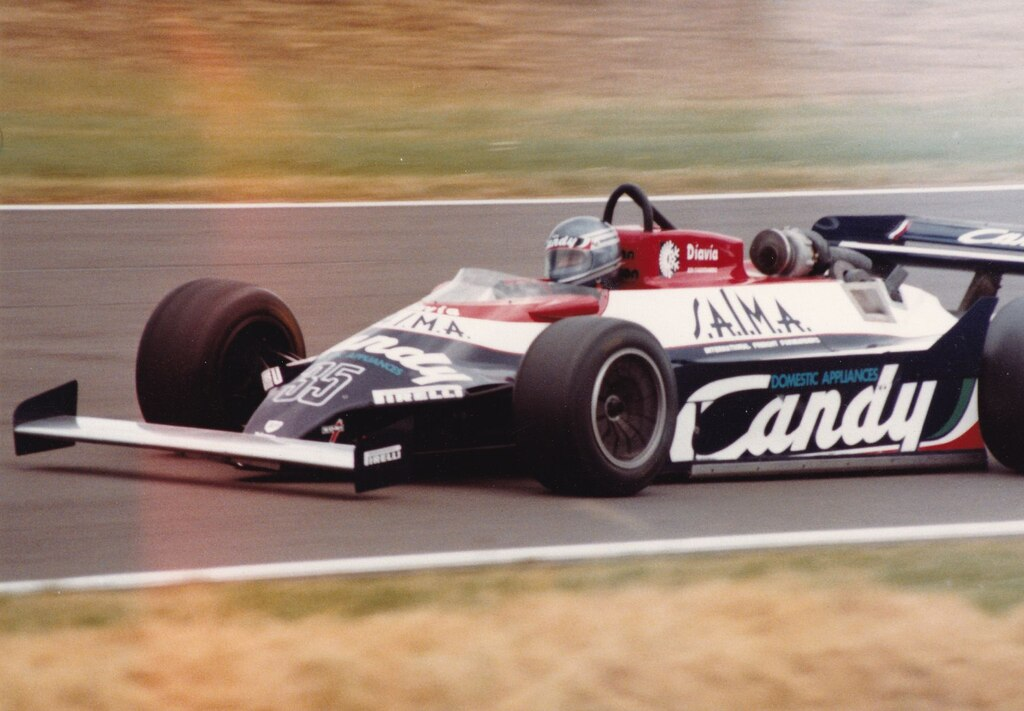
- Henton racing for Toleman in 1981
- Born: 19 September 1946 (age 80); Chaddesden, Derbyshire, United Kingdom

Formula One World Championship career
- Nationality: (United Kingdom) British
- Active years: 1975, 1977, 1981–1982
- Team(s): Lotus, non-works March, Boro, Toleman, Arrows, Tyrrell
- Entries: 37 (19 starts)
- Championships: 0
- Wins: 0
- Podiums: 0
- Career points: 0
- Pole positions: 0
- Fastest laps: 1
- First entry: 1975 British Grand Prix
- Last entry: 1982 Caesars Palace Grand Prix

Brian Henton (born 19 September 1946) is a former racing driver from England. He won both 1974 British Formula Three Championships and the 1980 European Formula Two Championship. He participated in 38 Formula One Grands Prix, debuting on 19 July 1975, but never scored any championship points.

== Career ==
Henton (nicknamed "Superhen" in the British racing press) came from a modest council house background and did not start racing until he was 23. On winning the minor British Formula Vee championship in 1971, ever-conscious of the value of public relations, he announced that he was going to be World Champion. This aim eluded him, but he enjoyed a successful career in Formula Three and Formula Two.

Henton's F1 debut came in 1975 for Lotus, theoretically a good drive but the team was in turmoil with the Lotus 72 finally uncompetitive and its replacement the Lotus 76 a failure, so nothing concrete was achieved. Between 1975 and 1978, he mixed Formula One and Formula Two drives (including a spell in a private March for his own British Formula One Racing Team), never quite establishing himself in either category, but clinched the 1980 F2 championship for Toleman, who took him into F1 for 1981. The first Toleman-Hart was something of a disaster, overweight and underdeveloped, and Henton only managed to qualify once. Unfruitful outings for Arrows and Tyrrell in 1982 led to no more success, though he did set the fastest lap at the British Grand Prix - Henton is the only driver in Formula One history to have set a fastest lap without ever scoring a championship point.

Perhaps fittingly, Henton's last Formula One outing was at the Race of Champions at Brands Hatch in April 1983, which also turned out to be the last non-championship F1 race in the modern era.

Following his retirement from the sport, Henton returned to running a car dealership and later moved into property development and in recent years has diversified into other areas, notably engineering. He has occasionally driven at historic events and holds equestrian events at his home in Ingarsby Hall, Leicestershire.

== Racing record ==
=== Career summary ===
Season	Series	Team	Races	Wins	Poles	F/Laps	Podiums	Points	Position
1973	John Player European British Formula Three	Brian Henton Racing	9	1	0	1	2	42	10th
1973	Lombard North British Formula Three	Brian Henton Racing	8	1	0	2	1	9	10th
1973	Forward Trust BARC British Formula Three	Brian Henton Racing	7	1	1	1	1	13	8th
1974	Lombard North British Formula Three	March Racing Team	11	7	4	11	9	78	**1st**
1974	Forward Trust BARC British Formula Three	March Racing Team	10	8	5	8	9	81	**1st**
1974	European Formula Two	March Racing Team	1	0	0	0	0	1	22nd
1975	European Formula Two	Brian Henton	7	0	0	1	1	10	11th
1975	European Formula Two	Wheatcroft Racing	1	0	0	0	1	10	11th
1975	Formula One	John Player Team Lotus	2	0	0	0	0	0	NC
1975	Japanese Formula Two	Victory Circle Club	1	0	0	?	1	0	NC
1976	Shellsport International Series	Netherton and Worth-Boxer Cars	3	0	0	0	2	27	11th
1977	European Formula Two	Netherton and Worth-Boxer Cars	4	1	0	1	1	12	10th
1977	European Formula Two	Ardmore Racing	1	0	0	0	0	12	10th
1977	Formula One	Rothmans International Racing	1	0	0	0	0	0	NC
1977	Formula One	HB Bewaking Alarmsystemen	1	0	0	0	0	0	NC
1977	Shellsport International Series	Hexagon Racing	1	0	0	0	1	12	16th
1978	European Formula Two	Brian Henton	12	0	1	1	0	3	17th
1978	Japanese Formula Two	Brian Henton	1	0	0	0	0	0	NC
1979	European Formula Two	Toleman Group Motorsport	12	2	3	2	4	36	**2nd**
1980	European Formula Two	Toleman Group Motorsport	11	3	2	7	9	61	**1st**
1981	Formula One	Candy Toleman Motorsport	1	0	0	0	0	0	NC
1982	Formula One	Team Tyrrell	13	0	0	1	0	0	NC
1982	Formula One	Ragno Arrows	1	0	0	0	0	0	NC

=== Complete European Formula Two Championship results ===
(key) (Races in bold indicate pole position; races in italics indicate fastest lap)

Year	Entrant	Chassis	Engine	1	2	3	4	5	6	7	8	9	10	11	12	13	14	Pos.	Pts
1974	March Racing Team	March 742	BMW	BAR	HOC	PAU	SAL	HOC	MUG; 6	KAR	PER	HOC	VLL					22nd	1
1975	Brian Henton	March 752	Hart	EST	THR; 8	HOC; 3	NÜR; 10	PAU; DSQ	HOC; Ret	SAL; 13	ROU	MUG; Ret	PER					11th	10
1975	Wheatcroft Racing	Wheatcroft 002	Ford BDA											SIL; 3	ZOL	NOG	VLL	11th	10
1976	Wheatcroft Racing	Wheatcroft R26	Abarth	HOC	THR; DNS	VLL	SAL	PAU	HOC	ROU	MUG	PER	EST	NOG	HOC			NC	0
1977	Netherton & Worth Boxer Cars	Boxer PR276	Hart	SIL; DNS	THR; 1	HOC; 5	NÜR; 9	VLL	PAU; 9	MUG	ROU	NOG	PER	MIS	EST			10th	12
1977	Ardmore Racing	Chevron B40	Hart													DON; 7		10th	12
1978	Brian Henton	March 782	Hart	THR; Ret	HOC; 17	NÜR; 5	**PAU**; Ret	MUG; 15	VLL; 8	ROU; 14	DON; 11	NOG; Ret	PER; 6	**MIS**; 11	HOC; Ret			17th	3
1979	Toleman Group Motorsport	Ralt RT2	Hart	SIL; 3	HOC; 4	THR; Ret				PAU; Ret	HOC; Ret	**ZAN**; 5	**PER**; DSQ	**MIS**; 1	DON; 4			**2nd**	**36**
1979	Toleman Group Motorsport	March 782	Hart				NÜR; 2	VLL; Ret	MUG; 1									**2nd**	**36**
1980	Toleman Group Motorsport	Toleman TG280	Hart	THR; 1	HOC; 2	NÜR; 2	VLL; 1	PAU; 3										**1st**	**61**
1980	Toleman Group Motorsport	Toleman TG280B	Hart						**SIL**; NC	ZOL; 2	MUG; 1	ZAN; 12	PER; 2	**MIS**; 2	HOC			**1st**	**61**

=== Complete Formula One World Championship results ===
(key)

Year	Entrant	Chassis	Engine	1	2	3	4	5	6	7	8	9	10	11	12	13	14	15	16	17	WDC	Points
1975	John Player Team Lotus	Lotus 72F	Ford Cosworth DFV 3.0 V8	ARG	BRA	RSA	ESP	MON	BEL	SWE	NED	FRA	GBR; 16	GER	AUT; DNS	ITA	USA; NC				NC	0
1977	Rothmans International Racing	March 761B	Ford Cosworth DFV 3.0 V8	ARG	BRA	RSA	USW; 10														NC	0
1977	British Formula One Racing Team	March 761	Ford Cosworth DFV 3.0 V8					ESP; DNQ	MON	BEL	SWE	FRA	GBR; DNQ	GER	AUT; DNQ						NC	0
1977	HB Bewaking Alarmsystemen	Boro 001	Ford Cosworth DFV 3.0 V8													NED; DSQ	ITA; DNQ	USA	CAN	JPN	NC	0
1978	Durex Team Surtees	Surtees TS20	Ford Cosworth DFV 3.0 V8	ARG	BRA	RSA	USW	MON	BEL	ESP	SWE	FRA	GBR	GER	AUT; PO^{‡}	NED	ITA	USA	CAN		–	–
1981	Candy Toleman Motorsport	Toleman TG181	Hart 415T 1.5 L4 t	USW	BRA	ARG	SMR; DNQ	BEL; DNQ	MON; DNPQ	ESP; DNQ	FRA; DNQ	GBR; DNQ	GER; DNQ	AUT; DNQ	NED; DNQ	ITA; 10	CAN; DNQ	CPL; DNQ			NC	0
1982	Ragno Arrows	Arrows A4	Ford Cosworth DFV 3.0 V8	RSA; DNQ	BRA; DNQ	USW; Ret															NC	0
1982	Team Tyrrell	Tyrrell 011	Ford Cosworth DFV 3.0 V8				SMR; Ret	BEL; Ret	MON; 8	DET; 9	CAN; NC	NED; Ret	GBR; 8	FRA; 10	GER; 7	AUT; Ret	SUI; 11	ITA; Ret	CPL; 8		NC	0

^{‡} Henton drove Rupert Keegan's No. 18 Surtees during practice for the 1978 Austrian Grand Prix but was not officially entered for the race.

=== Complete Formula One Non-Championship results ===
(key)

Year	Entrant	Chassis	Engine	1
1977	British Formula One Racing Team	March 761	Ford Cosworth DFV 3.0 V8	ROC; 4
1983	Theodore Racing Team	Theodore N183	Ford Cosworth DFV 3.0 V8	ROC; 4

Sporting positions
Preceded by Ian Taylor	British Formula 3 Championship; BARC Series Champion; 1974	Succeeded by Gunnar Nilsson
Preceded by Tony Brise; 1973 BRSCC North Central Lombard Series Champion	British Formula 3 Champion; BRSCC Series Champion; 1974	Succeeded by None
Preceded by Tony Brise; 1973 BRSCC JPS Series Champion	British Formula 3 Champion; BRSCC Series Champion; 1974	Succeeded by None
Preceded by Marc Surer	European Formula Two; Champion; 1980	Succeeded by Geoff Lees
