= 1978 BRDC International Trophy =

- Non-championship race in the 1978 Formula One season
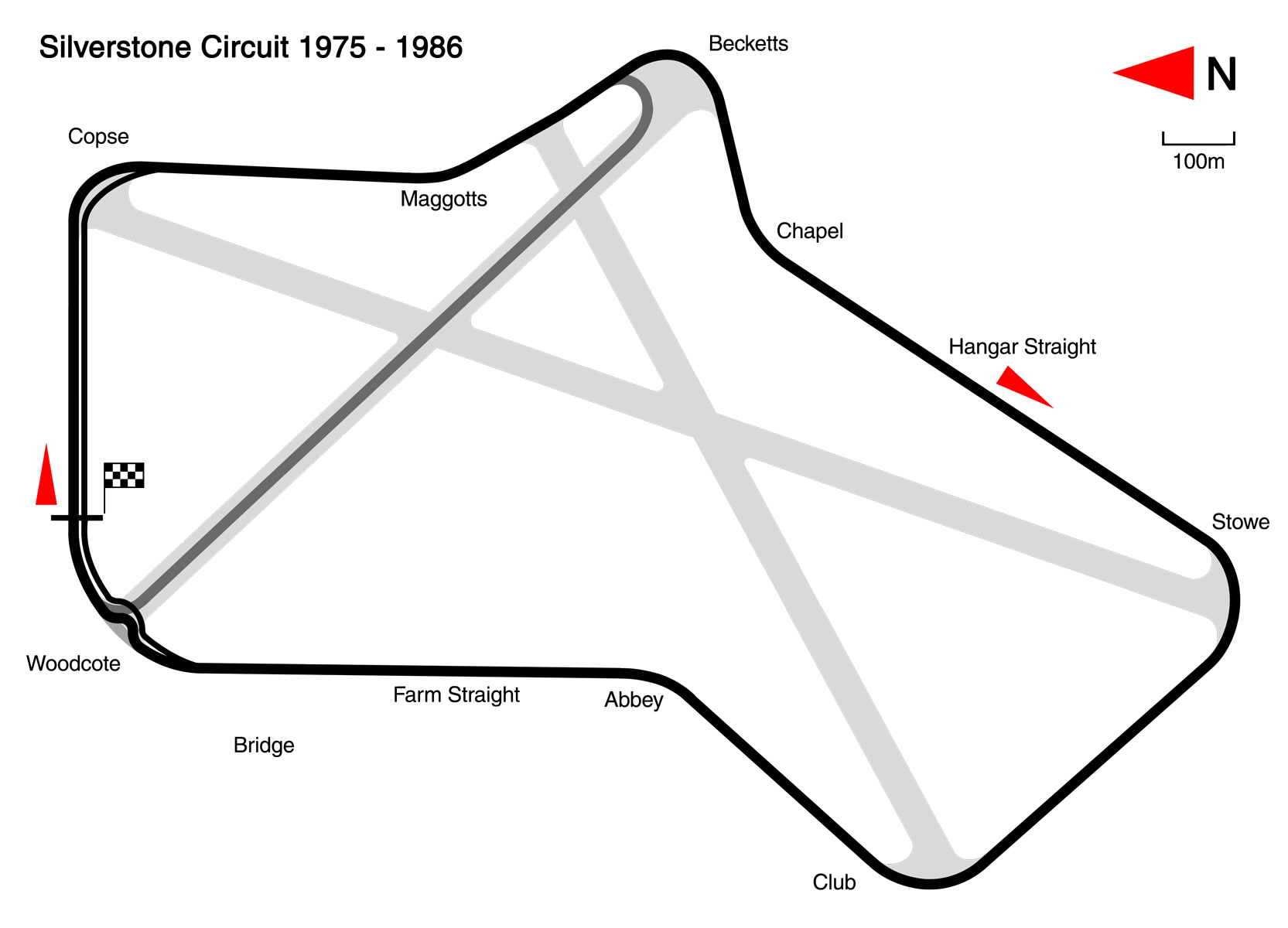
- The Silverstone circuit in 1978.

Race details
- Date: 19 March 1978
- Official name: XXX BRDC International Trophy
- Location: Silverstone Circuit, Northamptonshire
- Course: Permanent racing facility
- Course length: 4.724 km (2.935 miles)
- Distance: 40 laps, 188.95 km (117.41 miles)
- Weather: Heavy rain.

Pole position
Driver	(Sweden) Ronnie Peterson	Lotus-Cosworth
- Time: 1:16.07

Fastest lap
Driver	(Brazil) Emerson Fittipaldi	Fittipaldi-Cosworth
- Time: 1:38.63

Podium
First	(Finland) Keke Rosberg	Theodore-Cosworth
Second	(Brazil) Emerson Fittipaldi	Fittipaldi-Cosworth
Third	(United Kingdom) Tony Trimmer	McLaren-Cosworth

The XXX BRDC International Trophy was a non-championship motor race for Formula One cars held on 19 March 1978 at the Silverstone Circuit, England. It was the 30th running of the International Trophy, and the last to non-Championship Formula One regulations. The race was held over 40 laps of the Silverstone circuit, for a total distance of around 189 kilometres (117 miles).

Although qualifying sessions had been dry, the race was run in torrential rain, resulting in multiple accidents and drivers spinning off. The race was eventually won by Keke Rosberg, his first victory in a Formula One car in only his second ever Formula One race.

== Classification ==
=== Qualifying ===
Pos.	No.	Driver	Constructor	Q1	Q2	Gap
1	6	(Sweden) Ronnie Peterson	Lotus-Ford	1:16.85	1:16.07	—
2	1	(Austria) Niki Lauda	Brabham-Alfa Romeo	1:17.47	1:16.43	+0.36
3	5	(United States) Mario Andretti	Lotus-Ford	1:16.60	1:17.19	+0.53
4	7	(United Kingdom) James Hunt	McLaren-Ford	1:16.85	1:17.18	+0.78
5	30	(United States) Brett Lunger	McLaren-Ford	1:19.13	1:17.77	+1.70
6	3	(France) Patrick Depailler	Tyrrell-Ford	1:18.64	1:17.98	+1.91
7	16	(Germany) Hans Stuck Jr.	Shadow-Ford	1:21.48	1:18.15	+2.08
8	14	(Brazil) Emerson Fittipaldi	Fittipaldi-Ford	1:18.44	1:18.92	+2.37
9	38	(Republic of Ireland) Derek Daly	Hesketh-Ford	1:19.57	1:18.88	+2.81
10	18	(United Kingdom) Rupert Keegan	Surtees-Ford	1:18.96	1:19.10	+2.89
11	32	(Finland) Keke Rosberg	Theodore-Ford	1:19.03	1:19.54	+2.96
12	28	(Spain) Emilio de Villota	McLaren-Ford	1:19.85	1:19.36	+3.29
13	22	(Belgium) Jacky Ickx	Ensign-Ford	1:21.18	1:20.00	+3.93
14	31	(France) René Arnoux	Martini-Ford	1:20.34	1:20.09	+4.02
15	40	(United Kingdom) Tony Trimmer	McLaren-Ford	1:20.51	1:20.43	+4.36
16	17	(Switzerland) Clay Regazzoni	Shadow-Ford	1:20.63	1:21.26	+4.56
DNQ	24	(United Kingdom) Divina Galica	Hesketh-Ford	1:28.45	1:23.07	+7.00

=== Race ===
Pos	Driver	Entrant	Constructor	Laps	Time/Retired	Qual
1	(Finland) Keke Rosberg	Theodore Racing	Theodore-Cosworth	40	1:12:49.02	11
2	(Brazil) Emerson Fittipaldi	Copersucar Fittipaldi	Fittipaldi-Cosworth	40	+ 1.88	8
3	(United Kingdom) Tony Trimmer	Melchester Racing	McLaren-Cosworth	37	+ 3 Laps	15
4	(United States) Brett Lunger	BS Fabrications	McLaren-Cosworth	37	+ 3 Laps	7
5	(United Kingdom) Rupert Keegan	Durex Team Surtees	Surtees-Cosworth	31	+ 9 Laps	10
NC	(Germany) Hans Stuck Jr.	Villiger Kiel Team Shadow	Shadow-Cosworth	25	+ 15 Laps	5
Ret	(Republic of Ireland) Derek Daly	Olympus Hesketh	Hesketh-Cosworth	12	Accident	9
Ret	(United Kingdom) Divina Galica	Olympus Hesketh	Hesketh-Cosworth	11	Accident	DNQ*
Ret	(Spain) Emilio de Villota	Centro Asegurador	McLaren-Cosworth	9	Clutch	12
Ret	(France) Patrick Depailler	Team Tyrrell	Tyrrell-Cosworth	4	Accident	6
Ret	(United States) Mario Andretti	John Player Team Lotus	Lotus-Cosworth	2	Accident	3
Ret	(Sweden) Ronnie Peterson	John Player Team Lotus	Lotus-Cosworth	2	Handling	1**
Ret	(Belgium) Jacky Ickx	Tissot Ensign	Ensign-Cosworth	1	Spun off	13
Ret	(Switzerland) Clay Regazzoni	Villiger Kiel Team Shadow	Shadow-Cosworth	0	Spun off	16
Ret	(United Kingdom) James Hunt	Marlboro Team McLaren	McLaren-Cosworth	0	Spun off	4
DNS	(Austria) Niki Lauda	Parmalat Brabham	Brabham-Alfa Romeo		Spun off in warm-up	2
DNS	(France) René Arnoux	Automobiles Martini	Martini-Cosworth		Withdrew	14
DNA	(Germany) Jochen Mass	ATS Wheels Racing	ATS-Cosworth			
DNA	(Italy) Lamberto Leoni	Tissot Ensign	Ensign-Cosworth			
DNA	(Italy) Arturo Merzario	Merzario Racing	Merzario-Cosworth			
DNA	(United Kingdom) Guy Edwards	Team March	March-Cosworth			

* Failed to qualify, but started as first reserve driver after Lauda and Arnoux withdrew.
** Started from the pit lane.

== Sources ==
- BRDC International Trophy www.silhouet.com

Previous race: 1977 Race of Champions	Formula One non-championship races 1978 season	Next race: 1979 Race of Champions
Previous race: 1977 BRDC International Trophy	BRDC International Trophy	Next race: 1979 BRDC International Trophy
