= Brett Lunger =

American racing driver (born 1945)

- Brett Lunger leading Hans-Joachim Stuck and Jean-Pierre Jabouille at the 1978 British Grand Prix
- Born: November 14, 1945 (age 81); Wilmington, Delaware, U.S.

Formula One World Championship career
- Nationality: (United States) American
- Active years: 1975 – 1978
- Team(s): Hesketh, Surtees, non-works March, non-works McLaren, Ensign
- Entries: 43 (34 starts)
- Championships: 0
- Wins: 0
- Podiums: 0
- Career points: 0
- Pole positions: 0
- Fastest laps: 0
- First entry: 1975 Austrian Grand Prix
- Last entry: 1978 United States Grand Prix
- Military career
- Allegiance: United States
- Branch: United States Marine Corps
- Service years: 1967–1969
- Rank: Lieutenant
- Units: 1st Reconnaissance Battalions; 3rd Force Reconnaissance
- Conflicts: Vietnam War
- Awards: Purple Heart

Robert Brett Lunger (born November 14, 1945) is an American former racecar driver and US Marine.

Lunger was educated at the Holderness School, and Princeton University. He dropped out of Princeton after three years to enlist for service in Vietnam. He was a political science major. At the time he was preparing a thesis on U.S. policy on Southeast Asia. The Gulf of Tonkin Incident refuted much of what Lunger contended in his writing. A former US Marine lieutenant who served in the Vietnam war, his racing career was mostly spent in privateer cars, paid for by his family wealth, as Lunger's mother, Jane du Pont Lunger, was an heiress to the Du Pont family fortune and a prominent racehorse breeder.

Lunger participated in 43 Formula One World Championship Grands Prix, debuting in 1975, without scoring any championship points during his four seasons in Formula One.

Lunger's Formula One career started alongside James Hunt in the Hesketh team, followed by a season with Surtees in 1976. For 1977, he started the season with a year-old March 761 run by Bob Sparshott and entered under the name of his sponsor, Chesterfield Racing, but switched to a McLaren M23 after three races. In 1978, he stayed with the McLaren M23 and also tried an M26, but now entered by Sparshott's racing outfit, BS Fabrications. After a one-off drive for Ensign at the end of the season, Lunger moved on to sports car racing.

Lunger is also known for helping to rescue Niki Lauda from his burning Ferrari in 1976 at the Nürburgring. He was also awarded the Purple Heart medal.

== Early career ==
Lunger was not raised a car enthusiast. He was brought up to enjoy baseball, hockey, and football. He became interested in auto racing when a friend took him to a race in 1965. By 1966, he was the "rich kid" of the Can-Am series.

== Sports cars and Formula 5000 ==
Lunger finished eighth in a McLaren Chevrolet in the 1966, 252-mile (406 km) Nassau Trophy race, in Nassau, Bahamas. He was only a few seconds behind Peter Gregg in a Porsche Carrera 6. Lunger fielded a Lola T160 chassis in the 1968 Canadian American Challenge Cup (Can-Am). Others who drove Lola T160 cars were Swede Savage and Chuck Parsons.

Following the stint in the US Marines and the rank of captain in 1970, and competing in two SCCA National events, Lunger was among drivers in the 1971 L&M Grand Prix, at Lime Rock Park, who were competing for second place in the 1971 SCCA L&M 5000 Continental Championship. Lunger started the race with a 103 degree fever having been diagnosed with mononucleosis the previous day. As race progressed he started to lose strength allowing Sam Posey to pass and moving Lunger to third in the championship. He was hospitalized after the race for several days. His first major win was that year at Brainerd International Raceway in the Minnesota Grand Prix. Lunger had 58 points prior to the event. Lunger came in third overall in the overall standing, after David Hobbs had clinched the title with 99 points. His home at the time was Pomona, California.

Between 1972 and 1973, Lunger raced in European Formula Two. His best finish was a 4th place at Mantorp Park in Sweden, for Space Racing, in their March-Ford BDA 722.

In 1972, Lunger was third again in the L&M Continental 5000 Championship, trailing Graham McRae and Sam Posey. He moved into third place following a win at Road Atlanta in August, in the Road Atlanta Grand Prix. He followed this up with another win, this time in the Lime Rock Grand Prix.

Lunger might have finished third again in 1973 had mechanical problems not held him to just four finishes, and seventh overall. In addition to this, he completed in the European Formula Two Championship and Torneio Internacional de Formula 2 do Brasil.

In March 1973, Lunger placed second to Peter Gethin in the opening race of Rothman's Formula 5000 European Championship at Brands Hatch. He was in a Hogan Racing Lola. In the April 1973 Formula 5000 race at Riverside International Raceway, Lunger finished sixth. He led the first 19 laps before a stuck throttle forced him to spin at turn 7. A 17-second pit stop to look for damage dropped him to seventh place. Lunger was third in a Lola Chevrolet at the L&M Watkins Glen Grand Prix, in June 1973. Jody Scheckter and Brian Redman came in ahead of him in the Formula 5000 race. Lunger was second in a Lola in a Formula 5000 race at Mount Pocono, Pennsylvania, in September 1973. In between races in the US F5000, Lunger continued to race in the English-based Rothmans Championship, winning twice, at Snetterton and Mallory Park for Sid Taylor Racing in their Trojan T101.

Lunger drove for the Dan Gurney's Anglo American Racers team, in their Jorgensen Eagle 73A which debuted in Formula 5000 in 1974. He started all seven races of the 1974 SCCA/USAC F5000 Championship, posting a second, third and a sixth place, ending the season fifth in the overall standings. The Eagle marque was introduced in Formula 5000 in preparation for an entrance into Formula One in 1975. Redman won the Mid-Ohio Formula 5000 race in Lexington, Ohio, in June 1974. Lunger placed second, 1 minute and 14 seconds behind. Lunger was third in the Mosport International Raceway Formula 5000 race on June 16.

In July 1974, Lunger piloted a BMW 3.0 CSL in the six hours of Watkins Glen and competed in a Trans Am race, sponsored by the Sports Car Club of America, with George Follmer. Lunger started 8th and ran as high as 4th in the Can-Am Challenge Trophy race. He developed engine problems with four laps to go. Lunger said, We're not ready yet, but we're getting there. Lunger won 2 heat races but crashed during the 1974 California Grand Prix at Ontario Motor Speedway. He was trying to pass a slower car and at the same time hold off eventual race winner, Mario Andretti. Lunger's Eagle Chevy collided with Mickey Rupp as they entered a turn at the end of the infield straight. Their cars spun in a cloud of dust 100 feet (30 m) off the race track. Lunger assisted rescue workers in pulling Rupp from his car. Lunger and Follmer secured 2nd place in a turbocharged Porsche 935 of Vasek Polak, in the 1977 six hours endurance race at Watkins Glen. They were more than 3.377 mile-lap behind the winning team of Jacky Ickx and Jochen Mass. The victors drove a factory Porsche 935 with a 150 horsepower (110 kW) advantage over the 20 other customer Porsches, which composed the field of 44 cars.

Lunger teamed with Follmer and Derek Bell in a Vasek Polak entry in the Los Angeles Times 6-Hour Grand Prix of Endurance in April 1979. The 3-man team placed 3rd, 6 laps behind in a Porsche 935/79. The car started in the 23rd row due to engine problems during qualifying that kept it from posting a time.

== Formula One ==
=== 1975: Hesketh ===
Lunger joined the Hesketh Racing Formula One team in 1975 for the running of the 1975 Austrian Grand Prix. Aside from Mario Andretti and Mark Donohue, he was the only American driver on the elite circuit. At the age of 29, Lunger found himself without a car to drive for a major team. His friends bought him a ride with the team of Alexander Hesketh, 3rd Baron Hesketh for the remainder of the 1975 Formula One season. Lunger's brother, Dave, and Rod Campbell, a veteran motor racing public relations man, formed a combine in late 1975 to promote a Formula One ride for Lunger. In his debut Lunger started from the 9th row. He finished 13th in his Hesketh-Ford. In qualifying for the 1975 United States Grand Prix, Lunger wrecked his Hesketh, sustaining superficial damage to his car. He recovered to become one of 24 qualifiers for the 199.243-mile (320.651 km) race. Lunger ran as high as eighth at Watkins Glen, before he retired. In the 1975 Italian Grand Prix, he came in tenth.

=== 1976: Surtees ===
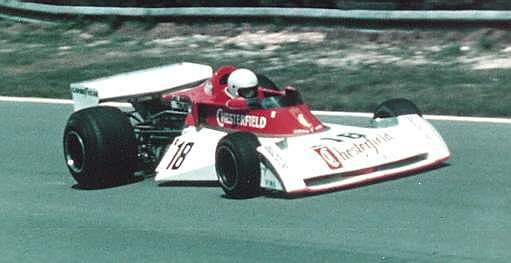
Lunger driving for Surtees at the 1976 British Grand Prix.

In 1976 Lunger moved to the Team Surtees. The corporation obtained sponsorship from Chesterfield, Rand Time Corporation, the Delaware Trust Company, and Champion Spark Plugs Company. On the first day of qualifying for the 1976 United States Grand Prix West in Long Beach, California, Lunger averaged only 83.61 miles per hour (134.56 km/h). Driving a Surtees-Ford, he was in 21st position. He described the dilemma of negotiating the Long Beach race track, which incorporated 85 circuits from Ocean Boulevard downtown to a parking lot and to Shoreline Drive, not far from the RMS Queen Mary, and then back to Ocean Boulevard. This course is so narrow, it's like trying to drive a Sherman tank through a parking lot. Lunger failed to make the field on the second day of qualifying. Only 20 cars started due to the narrowness of the Long Beach circuit. Lunger's Surtees broke the clutch in practice and was never correctly fixed.

The 1976 British GP was probably the best race of Lunger's GP career, qualifying mid grid, he climbed through the field to challenge his teammate Alan Jones.

Lunger is perhaps most renowned for being one of the drivers, along with Guy Edwards, Arturo Merzario and Harald Ertl, who saved Niki Lauda from his burning car during the 1976 German Grand Prix. Lunger described Lauda's accident which occurred on the 2nd lap. He went off at a speed of between 130 mph (210 km/h) and 140 mph (230 km/h). He had apparently crashed on exit, went through a couple of rows of catch fence, up a relatively steep bank, and back into the middle of the track, the Ferrari on fire. Lunger said that Edwards was able to get by Lauda's car to the left but Lunger was unable to avoid the wrecked Ferrari. He made contact about three quarters on because I was committed to a line and couldn't make it through the debris. Ertl followed, colliding with the Surtees and knocking it into Lauda's Ferrari. Lunger's fire extinguishers were set off by the collision which was fortunate and saved time in the rescue. Lunger got out of his Surtees which was tangled up with the Ferrari. The extinguishers going off had dampened the fire somewhat. Workers arrived and kept the fire down, eventually putting foam on the Ferrari. This enabled Lunger and Merzario to get close to the fire, although they could not free Lauda at first. Lauda was conscious, struggling to get free on his own. Again the fire flared up and kept the men back from the car's side. Lunger jumped on top of the Ferrari and grabbed Lauda by his shoulders. Merzario unbuckled the seatbelts and Lunger and Lauda tumbled out of the car as a portion of the cockpit broke apart. As Lauda and Lunger emerged corner workers put foam on them. They lay for a few seconds in the grass. The burning fuel was moving toward them so Lunger and Lauda walked six to eight steps away from the fire.

=== 1977–1978: McLaren, Ensign ===
In January 1977, Lunger announced that he had signed with BS Fabrications, an English race team, and manufacturer of race car components. He fielded a McLaren M23, the same car driven by James Hunt when he won the 1976 Formula One World Championship. In his first race of the season, Lunger finished 14th in the 1977 South African Grand Prix driving a March-Ford. The week prior to the race he lost a right rear wheel and crashed. It took his crew a week to rebuild the car from the ground up. During qualifying, he drove three timed laps before his car blew an engine. This meant that Lunger started the race at the rear. Lunger qualified his March on the 11th row, 21st starting position for the 1977 United States Grand Prix West. He did not complete the race after he was in an accident on the 4th lap. He drove a McLaren to a 19th-place finish in the 1977 German Grand Prix at Hockenheim. Lunger qualified 17th in Zeltweg for the 1977 Austrian Grand Prix. He had a time of 1 minute, 41.40 seconds. He placed 9th at Zandvoort in the 1977 Dutch Grand Prix. His McLaren was 2 laps behind winner Lauda. Lunger was tenth, two laps down, at the 1977 United States Grand Prix.

Lunger was one lap off the pace and finished 19th at Buenos Aires in the 1978 Argentine Grand Prix. Lunger's McLaren was 20th at Rio de Janeiro in the 1978 Brazilian Grand Prix and was 11th at Johannesburg in the 1978 South African Grand Prix, in March. Lunger started 24th, in last position, for the 1978 British Grand Prix at Brands Hatch. His qualifying time was 1:20.39. He went on to score his career best F1 finish, eighth place, albeit, one lap behind winner Carlos Reutemann. In the 1978 Austrian Grand Prix, he finished eighth, two laps off the winning pace. Lunger started an Ensign from 24th position in the 1978 United States Grand Prix. His time was 1:43.067. He finished 13th.

Lunger finished fourth in the non-championship 1978 BRDC International Trophy race at Silverstone. He was behind winner Keke Rosberg, second place Emerson Fittipaldi, and Tony Trimmer. The $190,000 event was hampered by rain over its 117.28 miles (188.74 km).

In many ways, Lunger was one of the last privateers in Formula One, plying his trade in year-old machinery, prepared by small independent racing teams. He called time on F1, at the end of the 1978 season, and returned to US Sports Car racing.

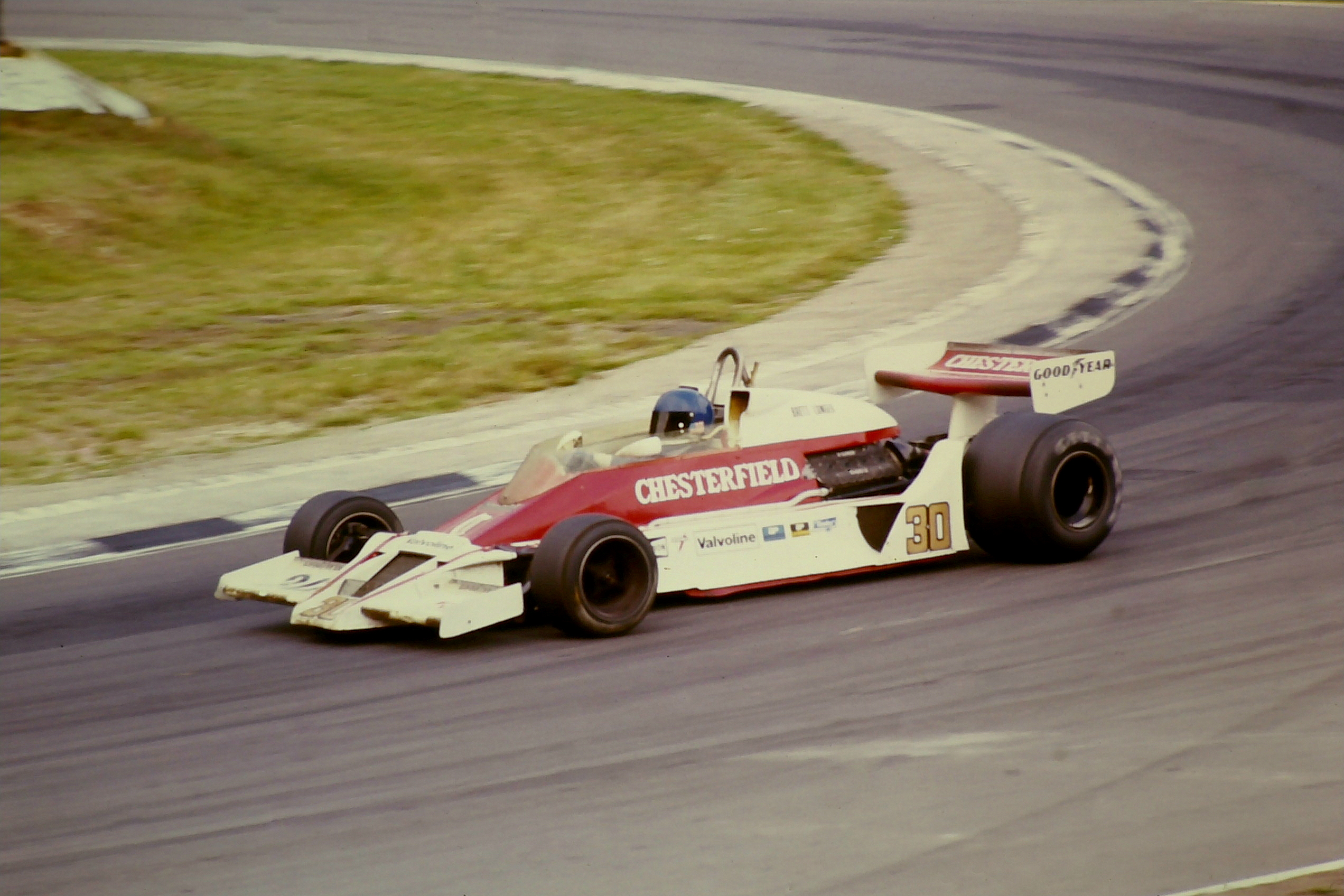
Lunger driving the BS Fabrications McLaren M26 at the 1978 British Grand Prix.

== Post-race life ==
Lunger failed to find an acceptable ride in 1979. During his retirement from racing he worked as a journalist with CBS, covering Formula One races like the 1979 South African Grand Prix. He completed his degree at Princeton.

Lunger also became an author of a workbook series centered around responsibility, and as a result, founded Responsibility Today. The I Am Responsible Movement was Lunger's way of giving back to the community by drawing from his many successes and failures during his early life and racing career. Lunger continues to expand his organization by attending conferences and writing blog articles related to responsible decision making on Responsibility Today's website.

Lunger takes part in cycling competitions in his spare time, when not running a research and development business. He is also a pilot, and this work, along with his wife, includes the Angel Flight Network.

== Racing record ==
=== Career highlights ===
Season	Series	Position	Team	Car
1971	L&M 5000 Continental Championship	**3rd**	Competition Research & Development	Lola-Chevrolet T192
1972	L&M 5000 Continental Championship	**3rd**	Hogan Racing	Lola-Chevrolet T300
1972	European Championship for Formula 2 Drivers	24th	Peter Bloome Racing; Space Racing	March-Ford BDA 722
1973	SCCA L&M Championship	7th	Hogan Racing	Lola-Chevrolet T330
1973	Rothmans F5000 Championship	7th	Hogan Racing; Sid Taylor Racing	Lola-Chevrolet T330; Trojan-Chevrolet T101
1973	European Championship for Formula 2 Drivers	32nd	Space Racing	Chevron -Ford BDA B25
1974	SCCA/USAC Formula 5000 Championship	5th	All American Racers	Eagle-Chevrolet 73A
1975	CASC Player's Challenge Series	22nd	Alan MacCall Racing	TUI-Ford BDA BH2
1976	SCCA/USAC Formula 5000 Championship	11th	Hogan Racing	Lola-Chevrolet T332
1978	Aurora AFX F1 Championship	21st	BS Fabrications	McLaren-Cosworth M23

=== Complete European Formula Two Championship results ===
(key) (Races in bold indicate pole position; races in italics indicate *fastest lap)

Year	Entrant	Chassis	Engine	1	2	3	4	5	6	7	8	9	10	11	12	13	14	15	16	17	Pos.	Pts
1972	Peter Bloore Racing	March 722	Ford BDA	MAL; 10																	24th	3
1972	Space Racing	March 722	Ford BDA		THR; DNS	HOC; Ret	PAU	PAL; DNQ	HOC; Ret	ROU; DNQ	ÖST; DNQ	IMO; DNQ	MAN; 4	PER	SAL	ALB	HOC; DNQ				24th	3
1973	Space Racing	Chevron B25	Ford BDA	MAL	HOC	THR	NÜR	PAU	KIN	NIV; 8	HOC	ROU; 7	MNZ; Ret	MAN	KAR; 9	PER	SAL	NOR	ALB	VLL; Ret	32nd	1

=== Complete Formula One World Championship results ===
(key)

Year	Team	Chassis	Engine	1	2	3	4	5	6	7	8	9	10	11	12	13	14	15	16	17	WDC	Points
1975	Hesketh Racing	Hesketh 308	Ford Cosworth DFV 3.0 V8	ARG	BRA	RSA	ESP	MON	BEL	SWE	NED	FRA	GBR	GER	AUT; 13	ITA; 10	USA; Ret				NC	0
1976	Chesterfield Team Surtees	Surtees TS19	Ford Cosworth DFV 3.0 V8	BRA	RSA; 11	USW; DNQ	ESP; DNQ	BEL; Ret	MON	SWE; 15	FRA; 16	GBR; Ret	GER; Ret	AUT; 10	NED	ITA; 14	CAN; 15	USA; 11	JPN		NC	0
1977	Chesterfield Racing	March 761	Ford Cosworth DFV 3.0 V8	ARG	BRA	RSA; 14	USW; Ret	ESP; 10	MON												NC	0
1977	Chesterfield Racing	McLaren M23B	Ford Cosworth DFV 3.0 V8							BEL; DNS	SWE; 11	FRA; DNQ	GBR; 13	GER; Ret	AUT; 10	NED; 9	ITA; Ret	USA; 10	CAN; 11	JPN	NC	0
1978	Liggett Group / B & S Fabrications	McLaren M23B	Ford Cosworth DFV 3.0 V8	ARG; 13	BRA; Ret	RSA; 11	USW; DNQ														NC	0
1978	Liggett Group / B & S Fabrications	McLaren M26	Ford Cosworth DFV 3.0 V8					MON; DNPQ	BEL; 7	ESP; DNQ	SWE; DNQ	FRA; Ret	GBR; 8	GER; DNPQ	AUT; 8	NED; Ret	ITA; Ret				NC	0
1978	Team Tissot Ensign	Ensign N177	Ford Cosworth DFV 3.0 V8															USA; 13	CAN		NC	0

=== Formula One non-championship results ===
(key) (Races in bold indicate pole position) (Races in italics indicate fastest lap)

Year	Entrant	Chassis	Engine	1	2
1976	Chesterfield Team Surtees	Surtees TS19	Ford Cosworth DFV 3.0 V8	ROC	INT; DNS
1978	B & S Fabrications	McLaren M23B	Ford Cosworth DFV 3.0 V8	INT; 4	
