= 1977 United States Grand Prix West =

Formula One motor race

- Race 4 of 17 in the 1977 Formula One season
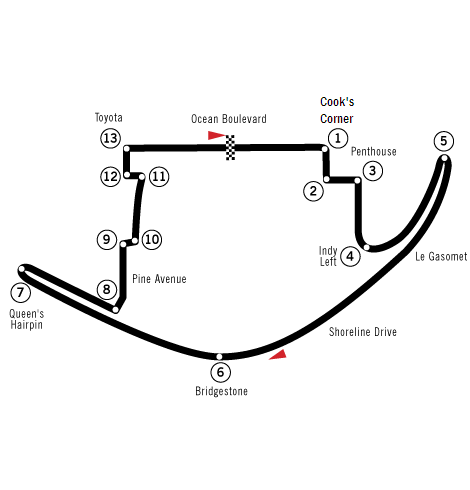

Race details
- Date: April 3, 1977
- Official name: Long Beach Grand Prix
- Location: Long Beach Street Circuit
- Course: Temporary street course
- Course length: 3.251 km (2.02 miles)
- Distance: 80 laps, 260.08 km (161.60 miles)
- Weather: Temperatures of 68 °F (20 °C); winds of 10.9 miles per hour (17.5 km/h)

Pole position
Driver	(Austria) Niki Lauda	Ferrari
- Time: 1:21.650

Fastest lap
Driver	(Austria) Niki Lauda	Ferrari
- Time: 1:22.753 on lap 62

Podium
First	(United States) Mario Andretti	Lotus-Ford
Second	(Austria) Niki Lauda	Ferrari
Third	(South Africa) Jody Scheckter	Wolf-Ford

The 1977 United States Grand Prix West (officially the Long Beach Grand Prix) was a Formula One motor race held on April 3, 1977 in Long Beach, California. It was the fourth race of the 1977 World Championship of F1 Drivers and the 1977 International Cup for F1 Constructors.

The 80-lap race was won by Mario Andretti, driving a Lotus-Ford. Andretti held off Niki Lauda in the Ferrari to become the only American to win a Formula One race on home soil, while also giving the ground-effect Lotus 78 its first win. Jody Scheckter finished third in the Wolf-Ford.

== Summary ==
The Formula One circus arrived at Long Beach in mourning following the deaths of Tom Pryce at the South African Grand Prix and Carlos Pace in a light aircraft crash near São Paulo. The Shadow team signed Alan Jones as Pryce's replacement, while Pace's place at Brabham was taken by Hans-Joachim Stuck. Stuck had been expected to drive for the new ATS team with its old Penske car but changed his mind, meaning that ATS had to sign Jean-Pierre Jarier instead.

The first practice session saw Jody Scheckter fastest in the Wolf with a time of 1:22.79, just ahead of Andretti in the Lotus 78. In the second session, Andretti went faster with a 1:22.06, but Ferrari's Niki Lauda took the pole position in final qualifying on Saturday with a 1:21.63. Scheckter was third, joined on the second row by the second Ferrari of Carlos Reutemann.

On Sunday, it was 68 degrees °F (20 °C) and very pleasant as the cars formed on the starting grid. At the green light, Scheckter shot past both Lauda and Andretti, and led into the first turn. Reutemann pulled next to Andretti on the inside approach to the turn, but braked too late and slid straight on. Andretti avoided a T-bone by braking in time to duck behind him into the corner.

James Hunt was allegedly pushed from behind, though no one knows for sure, and when he hit John Watson's right rear wheel with his left front, he was launched six feet in the air, showing Watson the entire underside of his McLaren. On landing, he slid past Reutemann and down the escape road. Hunt was able to make it back to the pits, and though his suspension was bent, he carried on, and ended up missing a point for sixth by just two seconds.

Meanwhile, the trio of Scheckter, Andretti and Lauda continued the battle they had been waging all weekend, with Scheckter leading by 1.7 seconds after three laps. On lap 4, Lauda was pressuring Andretti and tried to pass in the hairpin at the end of the curving back straight. He locked the Ferrari's brakes, but kept his foot down hard to avoid hitting Andretti's Lotus. The resulting flat spots on Lauda's tires caused a serious vibration throughout the race, and probably took away his chance of winning.

Scheckter maintained a consistent cushion over the battle for second; after 25 laps, Andretti was 2.5 seconds behind and Lauda was 4 seconds back. Even as they periodically worked their way through traffic, the three leaders never lost contact for more than half a lap. The Long Beach circuit was not particularly suited for cars that generate much downforce, and the new Lotus, with its higher aerodynamic drag, could not match the straight line speed of Scheckter's Wolf; Andretti continually closed in through the corners, but could not find a way past.

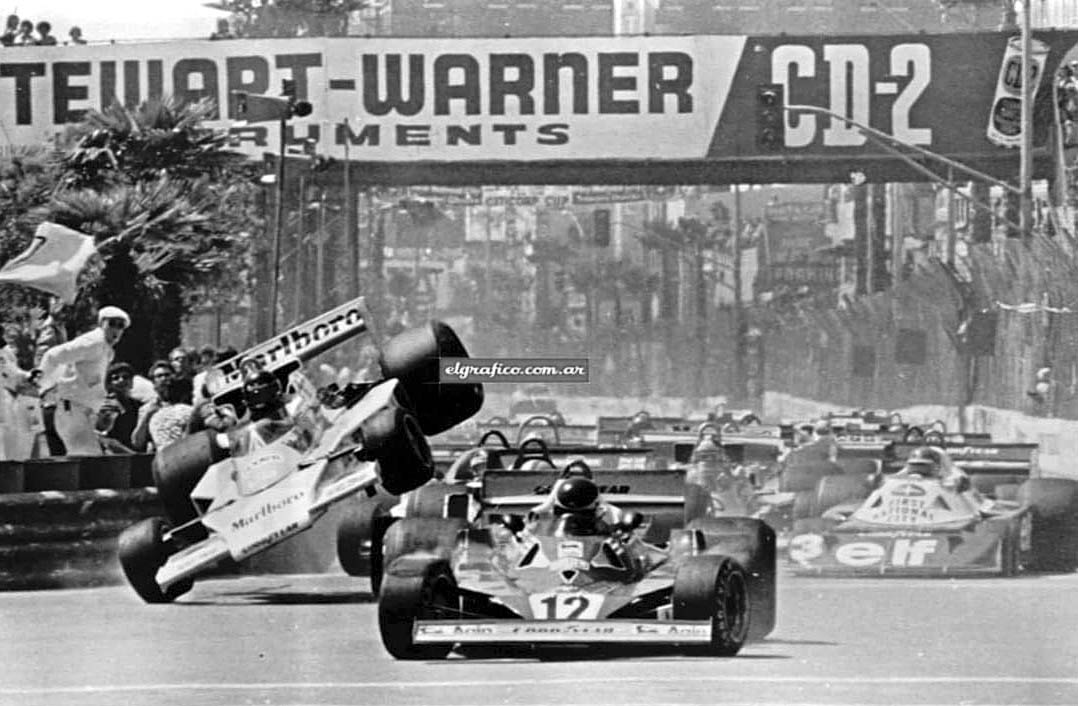
The McLaren driven by James Hunt almost in the air and close to Carlos Reutemann's Ferrari (#12) with the rest of the racers behind them

"I was preparing for a real banzai under braking," Andretti later said. "I needed to go from fifth to first gear in order to do it, and the way the gearboxes were in those days, I had maybe one or two tries to do that. My objective was to do it if I was in a position at the end of the race. Then I saw a twitch and, obviously, he had a tire that was slightly deflating."

On lap 58, Scheckter's lap time suddenly increased by two seconds, and as he passed the pits, he pointed emphatically to the crew at his right front tyre, which had developed a slow leak. The tyre began locking up time and again under braking, but Scheckter decided he was going to stay out and go as far as he could. For 18 laps, he tenaciously fought a losing battle as he held off each of Andretti's desperate attempts to pass as his deflating tyre got softer and softer.

"It was not at the point that the tyre was really going down, because it was the left side, not the right side, and it was not to the point that he really backed off any sooner because his braking point and turning point for the corner was the same."

On lap 77, Andretti outbraked the Wolf and pulled inside him entering the hairpin. "It's not that he went wide," he said afterwards, "I just got him clear at the braking point, and then after I went by him, I distanced myself." The frenzied crowd of 70,000 finally burst into rapturous applause as Andretti accelerated into the lead. Scheckter's despair was complete when Lauda also went by on the next lap. The crowd cheered Andretti home, deflecting considerable pressure from Lauda right to the flag, as he won by less than a second.

"It is one of the nicest moments of my career, even more satisfying than winning Indianapolis and really gratifying to have so many people pulling for me," Andretti said. "The car remained perfectly balanced throughout the race and the brakes were superb."

"It was not that I was given a break," Mario still insists. "I outbraked him clean. To me, it was just as satisfying a win. Jody tried to say that the only reason I passed him was because the tyre was going down; but if that was the case, he would have had a lot of smoke and a lot of locking up, and there was none of that. So, it was a good, satisfying win."

Scheckter held on for third place, and the scoring was completed by Patrick Depailler's Tyrrell, over a minute behind; Emerson Fittipaldi in the Copersucar; and Jarier in the ATS Penske-Ford.

== Classification ==
=== Qualifying ===
Pos	No	Driver	Constructor	Time/Gap
1	11	(Austria) Niki Lauda	Ferrari	1:21.630
2	5	(United States) Mario Andretti	Lotus–Ford	+0.238
3	20	(South Africa) Jody Scheckter	Wolf–Ford	+0.257
4	12	(Argentina) Carlos Reutemann	Ferrari	+0.630
5	26	(France) Jacques Laffite	Ligier–Matra	+0.666
6	7	(United Kingdom) John Watson	Brabham–Alfa Romeo	+0.742
7	28	(Brazil) Emerson Fittipaldi	Fittipaldi–Ford	+0.752
8	1	(United Kingdom) James Hunt	McLaren–Ford	+0.899
9	34	(France) Jean-Pierre Jarier	Penske–Ford	+0.981
10	3	(Sweden) Ronnie Peterson	Tyrrell–Ford	+1.025
11	19	(Italy) Vittorio Brambilla	Surtees–Ford	+1.029
12	4	(France) Patrick Depailler	Tyrrell–Ford	+1.045
13	22	(Switzerland) Clay Regazzoni	Ensign–Ford	+1.132
14	17	(Australia) Alan Jones	Shadow–Ford	+1.426
15	2	(West Germany) Jochen Mass	McLaren–Ford	+1.601
16	6	(Sweden) Gunnar Nilsson	Lotus–Ford	+1.754
17	8	(West Germany) Hans-Joachim Stuck	Brabham–Alfa Romeo	+2.181
18	10	(United Kingdom) Brian Henton	March–Ford	+2.406
19	18	(Austria) Hans Binder	Surtees–Ford	+2.543
20	16	(Italy) Renzo Zorzi	Shadow–Ford	+2.727
21	30	(United States) Brett Lunger	March–Ford	+3.349
22	9	(Brazil) Alex Ribeiro	March–Ford	+3.450

=== Race ===
Pos	No	Driver	Constructor	Laps	Time/Retired	Grid	Points
1	5	(United States) Mario Andretti	Lotus-Ford	80	1:51:35.470	2	9
2	11	(Austria) Niki Lauda	Ferrari	80	+ 0.773	1	6
3	20	(South Africa) Jody Scheckter	Wolf-Ford	80	+ 4.857	3	4
4	4	(France) Patrick Depailler	Tyrrell-Ford	80	+ 1:14.487	12	3
5	28	(Brazil) Emerson Fittipaldi	Fittipaldi-Ford	80	+ 1:20.908	7	2
6	34	(France) Jean-Pierre Jarier	Penske-Ford	79	+ 1 Lap	9	1
7	1	(United Kingdom) James Hunt	McLaren-Ford	79	+ 1 Lap	8	
8	6	(Sweden) Gunnar Nilsson	Lotus-Ford	79	+ 1 Lap	16	
9	26	(France) Jacques Laffite	Ligier-Matra	78	Electrical	5	
10	10	(United Kingdom) Brian Henton	March-Ford	77	+ 3 Laps	18	
11	18	(Austria) Hans Binder	Surtees-Ford	77	+ 3 Laps	19	
Ret	3	(Sweden) Ronnie Peterson	Tyrrell-Ford	62	Fuel System	10	
Ret	22	(Switzerland) Clay Regazzoni	Ensign-Ford	57	Gearbox	13	
Ret	8	(West Germany) Hans-Joachim Stuck	Brabham-Alfa Romeo	53	Brakes	17	
Ret	17	(Australia) Alan Jones	Shadow-Ford	40	Gearbox	14	
Ret	2	(West Germany) Jochen Mass	McLaren-Ford	39	Handling	15	
DSQ	7	(United Kingdom) John Watson	Brabham-Alfa Romeo	33	Illegal Push Start	6	
Ret	16	(Italy) Renzo Zorzi	Shadow-Ford	27	Gearbox	20	
Ret	9	(Brazil) Alex Ribeiro	March-Ford	15	Gearbox	22	
Ret	12	(Argentina) Carlos Reutemann	Ferrari	5	Accident	4	
Ret	30	(United States) Brett Lunger	March-Ford	4	Accident	21	
Ret	19	(Italy) Vittorio Brambilla	Surtees-Ford	0	Accident	11	

== Notes ==
- This was the 50th Grand Prix start for Italian engine supplier Alfa Romeo.
- This victory, coupled with CART series wins in 1984, 1985, and 1987, made Mario Andretti the only driver to have won the Grand Prix of Long Beach in both Formula 1 and in Indy cars.

== Championship standings after the race ==
Drivers' Championship standings

	Pos	Driver	Points
	1	(South Africa) Jody Scheckter	19
1	2	(Austria) Niki Lauda	19
1	3	(Argentina) Carlos Reutemann	13
4	4	(United States) Mario Andretti	11
1	5	(United Kingdom) James Hunt	9

Constructors' Championship standings

	Pos	Constructor	Points
	1	(Italy) Ferrari	28
	2	(Canada) Wolf-Ford	19
4	3	(United Kingdom) Lotus-Ford	13
1	4	(United Kingdom) McLaren-Ford	9
	5	(Brazil) Fittipaldi-Ford	8

- Note: Only the top five positions are included for both sets of standings.

Previous race: 1977 South African Grand Prix	FIA Formula One World Championship; 1977 season	Next race: 1977 Spanish Grand Prix
Previous race: 1976 United States Grand Prix West	United States Grand Prix West	Next race: 1978 United States Grand Prix West

Preceded by 1976 United States Grand Prix West	Grand Prix of Long Beach	Succeeded by 1978 United States Grand Prix West
