= 1977 Austrian Grand Prix =

- Race 12 of 17 in the 1977 Formula One season

Race details
- Date: 14 August 1977
- Official name: XV Gröbl Möbel Großer Preis von Österreich
- Location: Österreichring; Spielberg, Styria, Austria
- Course: Permanent racing facility
- Course length: 5.942 km (3.692 miles)
- Distance: 54 laps, 320.868 km (199.378 miles)
- Weather: Wet, then drying

Pole position
Driver	(Austria) Niki Lauda	Ferrari
- Time: 1:39.32

Fastest lap
Driver	(United Kingdom) John Watson	Brabham-Alfa Romeo
- Time: 1:40.96 on lap 52

Podium
First	(Australia) Alan Jones	Shadow-Ford
Second	(Austria) Niki Lauda	Ferrari
Third	(West Germany) Hans-Joachim Stuck	Brabham-Alfa Romeo

The 1977 Austrian Grand Prix was a Formula One motor race held at the Österreichring on 14 August 1977. It was the twelfth race of the 1977 World Championship of F1 Drivers and the 1977 International Cup for F1 Constructors.

Since the previous year's race, the Hella-Licht corner had been converted to a fast chicane, thus increasing the length of the circuit to 5.942 kilometres (3.692 mi). The race was held over 54 laps of the circuit for a race distance of 320.8 kilometres (199.3 mi).

The race was won by Australian driver and future World Champion, Alan Jones, driving a Shadow-Ford. It was Jones's first Formula One victory, and the only victory for the Shadow team in its eight-year F1 history. Local hero Niki Lauda finished second in his Ferrari, having started from pole position, with West Germany's Hans-Joachim Stuck third in a Brabham-Alfa Romeo.

== Qualifying ==
=== Qualifying classification ===
Pos.	Driver	Constructor	Time	No
1	(Austria) Niki Lauda	Ferrari	1:39,32	1
2	(United Kingdom) James Hunt	McLaren-Ford	1:39,45	2
3	(United States) Mario Andretti	Lotus-Ford	1:39,74	3
4	(West Germany) Hans-Joachim Stuck	Brabham-Alfa Romeo	1:39,97	4
5	(Argentina) Carlos Reutemann	Ferrari	1:40,12	5
6	(France) Jacques Laffite	Ligier-Matra	1:40,22	6
7	(France) Patrick Tambay	Ensign-Ford	1:40,29	7
8	(South Africa) Jody Scheckter	Wolf-Ford	1:40,40	8
9	(West Germany) Jochen Mass	McLaren-Ford	1:40,44	9
10	(France) Patrick Depailler	Tyrrell-Ford	1:40,62	10
11	(Switzerland) Clay Regazzoni	Ensign-Ford	1:40,74	11
12	(United Kingdom) John Watson	Brabham-Alfa Romeo	1:40,92	12
13	(Italy) Vittorio Brambilla	Surtees-Ford	1:40,93	13
14	(Australia) Alan Jones	Shadow-Ford	1:41,00	14
15	(Sweden) Ronnie Peterson	Tyrrell-Ford	1:41,13	15
16	(Sweden) Gunnar Nilsson	Lotus-Ford	1:41,24	16
17	(United States) Brett Lunger	McLaren-Ford	1:41,40	17
18	(France) Jean-Pierre Jarier	Penske-Ford	1:41,70	18
19	(Austria) Hans Binder	Penske-Ford	1:41,71	19
20	(United Kingdom) Rupert Keegan	Hesketh-Ford	1:41,92	20
21	(Italy) Arturo Merzario	Shadow-Ford	1:41,92	21
22	(Belgium) Patrick Nève	March-Ford	1:41,96	22
23	(Brazil) Emerson Fittipaldi	Fittipaldi-Ford	1:42,15	23
24	(South Africa) Ian Scheckter	March-Ford	1:42,22	24
25	(Australia) Vern Schuppan	Surtees-Ford	1:42,31	25
26	(Spain) Emilio de Villota	McLaren-Ford	1:42,38	26
Cut-off
27	(United Kingdom) Brian Henton	March-Ford	1:42,43	—
28	(United Kingdom) Ian Ashley	Hesketh-Ford	1:42,52	—
29	(Mexico) Héctor Rebaque	Hesketh-Ford	1:42,75	—
30	(Brazil) Alex Ribeiro	March-Ford	no time	—

== Race ==
=== Race report ===
Rain had fallen immediately prior to the race start leaving the track wet but would not rain during the race. Tyre choice was split between wets and slicks. Mario Andretti led early until the engine failed in his Lotus 78. The track was drying by this time. Gunnar Nilsson and Jones had starred in the early laps on the wet track. Nilsson moving from 16th to second and Jones progressed from his 14th grid position to fourth. James Hunt became the race leader. Nilsson pitted to replace his ruined wet tyres on his Lotus 78 while Jones moved past Hans-Joachim Stuck's Brabham and Jody Scheckter's Wolf WR3 into second position. Jones would not have progressed further but for an engine failure in Hunt's McLaren M26 late in the race. Nilsson recovered from his pitstop to third until an engine failure claimed its second Lotus of the day. Lauda's poor handling Ferrari came on as the track dried and he moved into second while Stuck survived to claim the final podium position. Scheckter spun off leaving Carlos Reutemann in the second Ferrari 312T2 to finish fourth ahead of Ronnie Peterson in the Tyrrell P34 and the second McLaren of Jochen Mass claimed the final championship point in sixth. Despite the changeable condition, 16 cars finished the race with 17 classified. The seventeenth was Emilio de Villota, who crashed his privately entered McLaren M23 in the closing stages while on his 51st lap.

It had been seven years since the last victory by an Australian (Jack Brabham in the 1970 South African Grand Prix). Jones' win had no effect on the championship points race. Lauda's second place, coupled with retirements to Scheckter, Andretti and Hunt significantly strengthened Lauda's grip on the championship, expanding his lead to 16 points.

According to a misconception claimed by Alan Jones the "Happy Birthday to You" was played for him as a winning driver during the podium ceremony instead of the national anthem of Australia. However, "Advance Australia Fair" was actually played, different from what Jones remembered. Yet "God Save the Queen" was the national anthem of Australia in 1977, being replaced by "Advance Australia Fair" in 1984, and "God Save the Queen" was really not played on the podium.

=== Classification ===
Pos	No	Driver	Constructor	Laps	Time/Retired	Grid	Points
1	17	(Australia) Alan Jones	Shadow-Ford	54	1:37:16.49	14	9
2	11	(Austria) Niki Lauda	Ferrari	54	+ 20.13	1	6
3	8	(West Germany) Hans-Joachim Stuck	Brabham-Alfa Romeo	54	+ 34.5	4	4
4	12	(Argentina) Carlos Reutemann	Ferrari	54	+ 34.75	5	3
5	3	(Sweden) Ronnie Peterson	Tyrrell-Ford	54	+ 1:02.09	15	2
6	2	(West Germany) Jochen Mass	McLaren-Ford	53	+ 1 Lap	9	1
7	24	(United Kingdom) Rupert Keegan	Hesketh-Ford	53	+ 1 Lap	20	
8	7	(United Kingdom) John Watson	Brabham-Alfa Romeo	53	+ 1 Lap	12	
9	27	(Belgium) Patrick Nève	March-Ford	53	+ 1 Lap	22	
10	30	(United States) Brett Lunger	McLaren-Ford	53	+ 1 Lap	17	
11	28	(Brazil) Emerson Fittipaldi	Fittipaldi-Ford	53	+ 1 Lap	23	
12	33	(Austria) Hans Binder	Penske-Ford	53	+ 1 Lap	19	
13	4	(France) Patrick Depailler	Tyrrell-Ford	53	+ 1 Lap	10	
14	34	(France) Jean-Pierre Jarier	Penske-Ford	52	+ 2 Laps	18	
15	19	(Italy) Vittorio Brambilla	Surtees-Ford	52	+ 2 Laps	13	
16	18	(Australia) Vern Schuppan	Surtees-Ford	52	+ 2 Laps	25	
17	36	(Spain) Emilio de Villota	McLaren-Ford	50	Accident	26	
Ret	20	(South Africa) Jody Scheckter	Wolf-Ford	45	Spun Off	8	
Ret	1	(United Kingdom) James Hunt	McLaren-Ford	43	Engine	2	
Ret	23	(France) Patrick Tambay	Ensign-Ford	41	Engine	7	
Ret	6	(Sweden) Gunnar Nilsson	Lotus-Ford	38	Engine	16	
Ret	16	(Italy) Arturo Merzario	Shadow-Ford	29	Gearbox	21	
Ret	26	(France) Jacques Laffite	Ligier-Matra	21	Oil Leak	6	
Ret	5	(United States) Mario Andretti	Lotus-Ford	11	Engine	3	
Ret	10	(South Africa) Ian Scheckter	March-Ford	2	Accident	24	
Ret	22	(Switzerland) Clay Regazzoni	Ensign-Ford	0	Accident	11	
DNQ	38	(United Kingdom) Brian Henton	March-Ford				
DNQ	39	(United Kingdom) Ian Ashley	Hesketh-Ford				
DNQ	25	(Mexico) Héctor Rebaque	Hesketh-Ford				
DNQ	9	(Brazil) Alex Ribeiro	March-Ford				

== Notes ==
- This was the 25th podium finish for an Alfa Romeo-powered car.

== Championship standings after the race ==
Drivers' Championship standings

	Pos	Driver	Points
	1	(Austria) **Niki Lauda***	54
	2	(South Africa) **Jody Scheckter***	38
1	3	(Argentina) **Carlos Reutemann***	34
1	4	(United States) **Mario Andretti***	32
	5	(United Kingdom) **James Hunt***	22

Constructors' Championship standings

Pos	Constructor	Points
1	(Italy) **Ferrari***	71 (73)
2	(United Kingdom) **Lotus-Ford***	47
3	(Canada) **Wolf-Ford***	38
4	(United Kingdom) **McLaren-Ford***	35
5	(United Kingdom) Brabham-Alfa Romeo	27

- Note: Only the top five positions are included for both sets of standings. Only the best 8 results from the first 9 races and the best 7 results from the remaining 8 races were retained. Numbers without parentheses are retained points; numbers in parentheses are total points scored.
- Competitors in bold and marked with an asterisk still had a theoretical chance of becoming World Champion.

Previous race: 1977 German Grand Prix	FIA Formula One World Championship; 1977 season	Next race: 1977 Dutch Grand Prix
Previous race: 1976 Austrian Grand Prix	Austrian Grand Prix	Next race: 1978 Austrian Grand Prix
