= 1977 Dutch Grand Prix =

- Race 13 of 17 in the 1977 Formula One season

Race details
- Date: August 28, 1977
- Official name: XXIV Grote Prijs van Nederland
- Location: Zandvoort
- Course: Permanent racing facility
- Course length: 4.226 km (2.626 miles)
- Distance: 75 laps, 316.95 km (196.95 miles)
- Weather: Dry

Pole position
Driver	(United States) Mario Andretti	Lotus-Ford
- Time: 1:18.65

Fastest lap
Driver	(Austria) Niki Lauda	Ferrari
- Time: 1:19.99 on lap 72

Podium
First	(Austria) Niki Lauda	Ferrari
Second	(France) Jacques Laffite	Ligier-Matra
Third	(South Africa) Jody Scheckter	Wolf-Ford

The 1977 Dutch Grand Prix was a Formula One motor race held at Circuit Zandvoort on 28 August 1977.

== Report ==
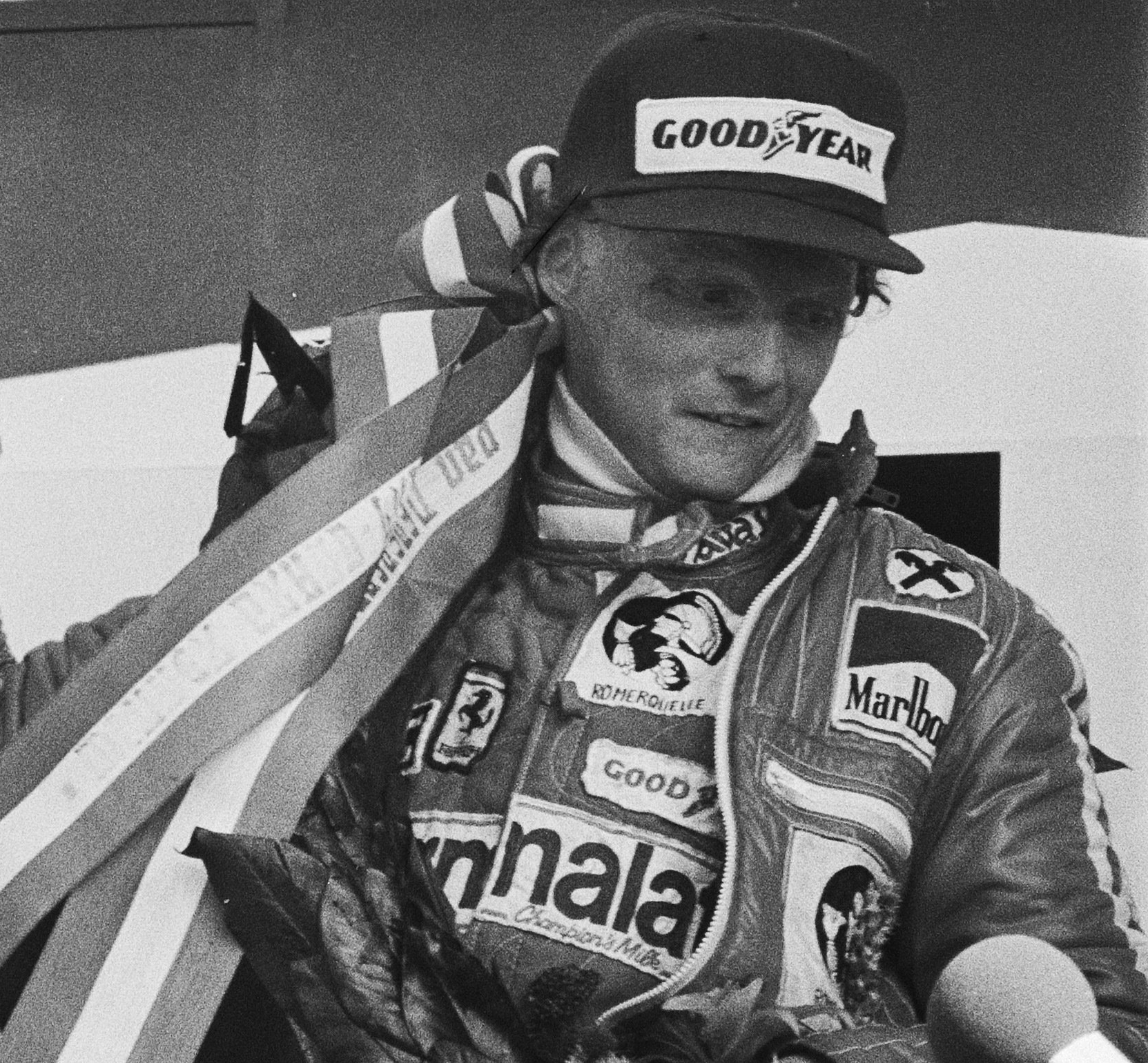
Niki Lauda celebrating on the rostrum

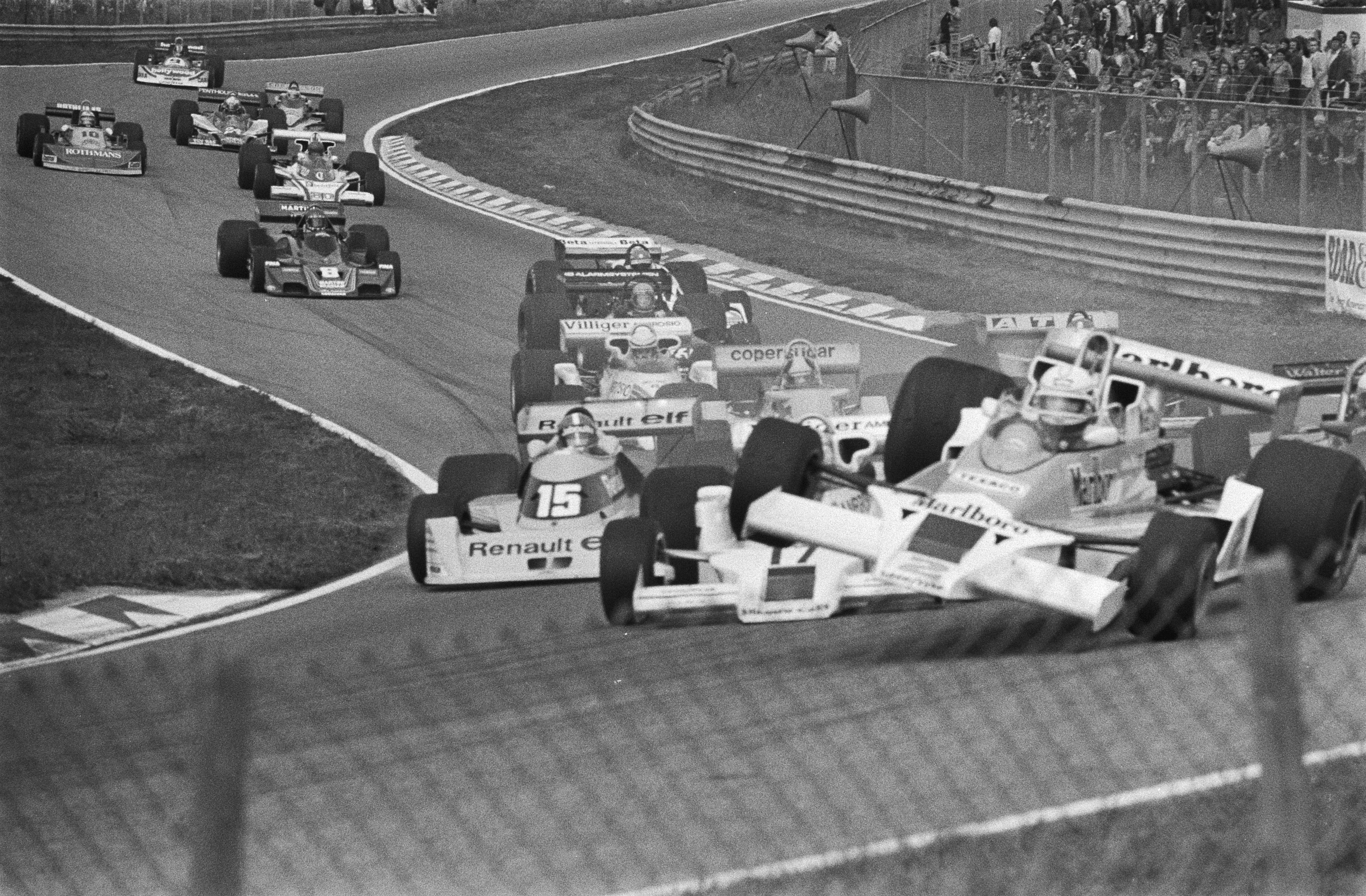
An accident on the first lap took out Jochen Mass (#2).

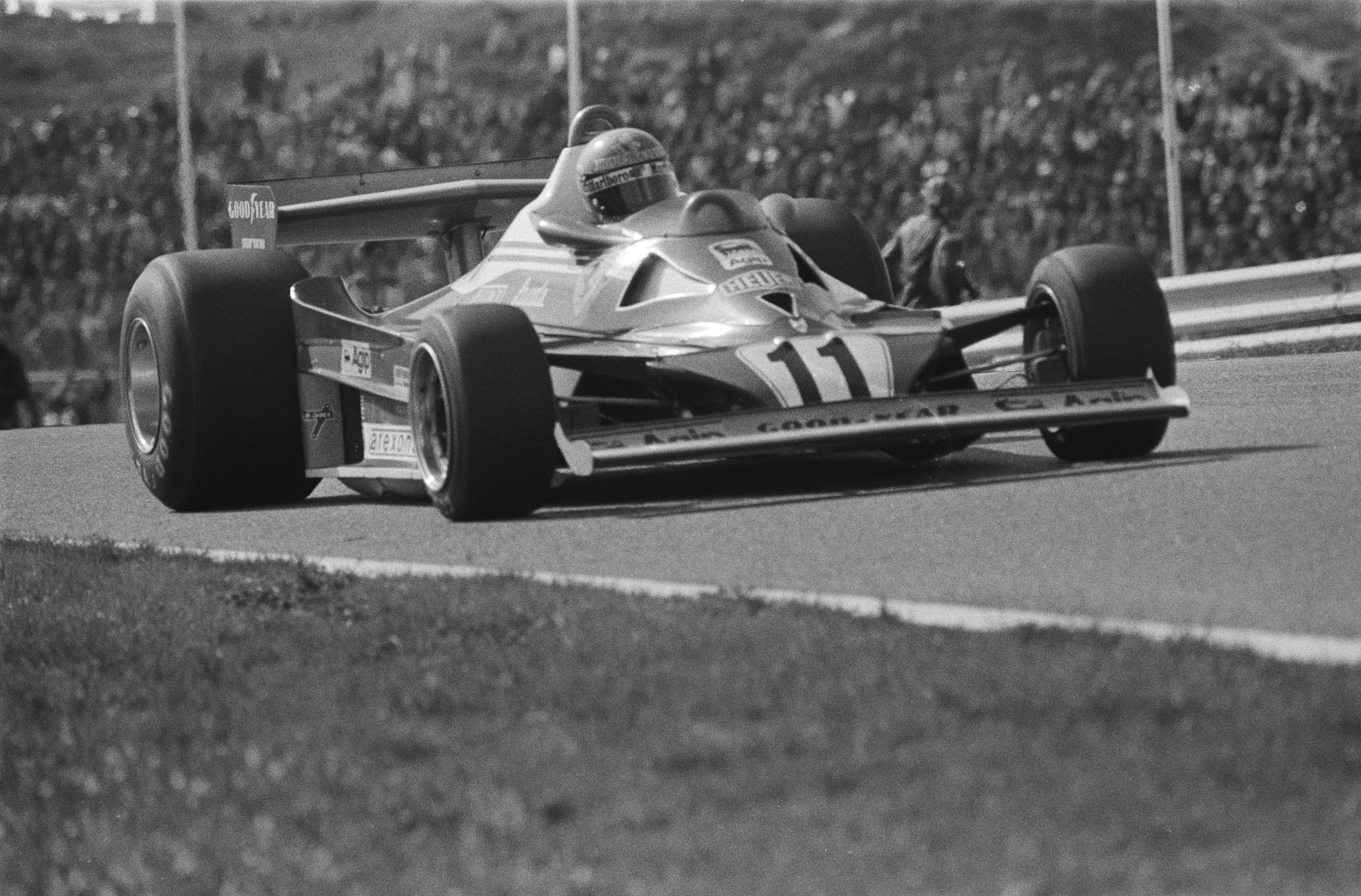
Lauda during the race in his Ferrari 312T.

In qualifying, Mario Andretti took his fifth pole of the season with Jacques Laffite alongside on the front row, and James Hunt third. At the start, Hunt jumped both the front row starters to lead but before the end of the first lap, Andretti tried to drive alongside him but some aggressive defending from Hunt forced him to lift, and Laffite took advantage to get second. Five laps later, Andretti had got back past Laffite and was attacking Hunt, who again defended aggressively but this time Andretti did not lift and they collided. Hunt was out on the spot, whereas Andretti spun and rejoined fourth. Brian Henton was disqualified after he was push started after he spun off.

This left Laffite leading from the Ferraris of Niki Lauda and Carlos Reutemann. The latter had a long battle with Andretti for third, repeatedly exchanging places, until the Lotus driver's engine blew up. Soon after, Lauda passed Laffite to take the lead, and he went on build a gap and win comfortably. Laffite finished second. After Andretti's demise, Reutemann ran third until the second Lotus of Gunnar Nilsson attacked him, and the two collided with Nilsson out and Reutemann rejoining at the back. This sensationally left Patrick Tambay in the Ensign third, but he ran out of fuel on the last lap, thus handing the place to Scheckter.

This meant that Lauda had a 21-point lead over Scheckter with four races left.

== Classification ==
=== Qualifying ===
Pos.	Driver	Constructor	Time
1	(United States) Mario Andretti	Lotus–Ford	1:18.65
2	(France) Jacques Laffite	Ligier–Matra	+0.62
3	(United Kingdom) James Hunt	McLaren–Ford	+0.85
4	(Austria) Niki Lauda	Ferrari	+0.89
5	(Sweden) Gunnar Nilsson	Lotus–Ford	+0.92
6	(Argentina) Carlos Reutemann	Ferrari	+1.01
7	(Sweden) Ronnie Peterson	Tyrrell–Ford	+1.20
8	(United Kingdom) John Watson	Brabham–Alfa Romeo	+1.28
9	(Switzerland) Clay Regazzoni	Ensign–Ford	+1.28
10	(France) Jean-Pierre Jabouille	Renault	+1.48
11	(France) Patrick Depailler	Tyrrell–Ford	+1.49
12	(France) Patrick Tambay	Ensign–Ford	+1.58
13	(Australia) Alan Jones	Shadow–Ford	+1.59
14	(West Germany) Jochen Mass	McLaren–Ford	+1.59
15	(South Africa) Jody Scheckter	Wolf–Ford	+1.59
16	(Italy) Riccardo Patrese	Shadow–Ford	+1.78
17	(Brazil) Emerson Fittipaldi	Fittipaldi–Ford	+1.88
18	(Austria) Hans Binder	Penske–Ford	+2.19
19	(West Germany) Hans-Joachim Stuck	Brabham–Alfa Romeo	+2.21
20	(United States) Brett Lunger	McLaren–Ford	+2.22
21	(France) Jean-Pierre Jarier	Penske–Ford	+2.41
22	(Italy) Vittorio Brambilla	Surtees–Ford	+2.47
23	(United Kingdom) Brian Henton	Boro–Ford	+2.48
24	(Brazil) Alex Ribeiro	March–Ford	+2.51
25	(South Africa) Ian Scheckter	March–Ford	+2.54
26	(United Kingdom) Rupert Keegan	Hesketh–Ford	+2.88
Cut-off
27	(Belgium) Patrick Nève	March–Ford	+3.02
28	(Italy) Arturo Merzario	March–Ford	+3.14
29	(Australia) Vern Schuppan	Surtees–Ford	+3.15
30	(United Kingdom) Ian Ashley	Hesketh–Ford	+3.20
31	(Netherlands) Boy Hayje	March–Ford	+3.55
32	(Mexico) Héctor Rebaque	Hesketh–Ford	+3.84
33	(Belgium) Teddy Pilette	BRM	+4.42
34	(Netherlands) Michael Bleekemolen	March–Ford	+8.03

=== Race ===
Pos	No	Driver	Constructor	Tyre	Laps	Time/Retired	Grid	Points
1	11	(Austria) Niki Lauda	Ferrari	G	75	1:41:45.93	4	9
2	26	(France) Jacques Laffite	Ligier-Matra	G	75	+1.89 secs	2	6
3	20	(South Africa) Jody Scheckter	Wolf-Ford	G	74	+ 1 Lap	15	4
4	28	(Brazil) Emerson Fittipaldi	Fittipaldi-Ford	G	74	+ 1 Lap	17	3
5	23	(France) Patrick Tambay	Ensign-Ford	G	73	Out of fuel	12	2
6	12	(Argentina) Carlos Reutemann	Ferrari	G	73	+ 2 Laps	6	1
7	8	(West Germany) Hans-Joachim Stuck	Brabham-Alfa Romeo	G	73	+ 2 Laps	19	
8	35	(Austria) Hans Binder	Penske-Ford	G	73	+ 2 Laps	18	
9	30	(United States) Brett Lunger	McLaren-Ford	G	73	+ 2 Laps	20	
10	10	(South Africa) Ian Scheckter	March-Ford	G	73	+ 2 Laps	25	
11	9	(Brazil) Alex Ribeiro	March-Ford	G	72	+ 3 Laps	24	
12	19	(Italy) Vittorio Brambilla	Surtees-Ford	G	67	Accident	22	
13	16	(Italy) Riccardo Patrese	Shadow-Ford	G	67	Engine	16	
DSQ	38	(United Kingdom) Brian Henton	Boro-Ford	G	52	Push Start	23	
Ret	15	(France) Jean-Pierre Jabouille	Renault	MI	39	Suspension	10	
Ret	6	(Sweden) Gunnar Nilsson	Lotus-Ford	G	34	Accident	5	
Ret	17	(Australia) Alan Jones	Shadow-Ford	G	32	Engine	13	
Ret	4	(France) Patrick Depailler	Tyrrell-Ford	G	31	Engine	11	
Ret	3	(Sweden) Ronnie Peterson	Tyrrell-Ford	G	18	Ignition	7	
Ret	22	(Switzerland) Clay Regazzoni	Ensign-Ford	G	17	Throttle	9	
Ret	5	(United States) Mario Andretti	Lotus-Ford	G	14	Engine	1	
Ret	24	(United Kingdom) Rupert Keegan	Hesketh-Ford	G	8	Accident	26	
Ret	1	(United Kingdom) James Hunt	McLaren-Ford	G	5	Collision	3	
Ret	34	(France) Jean-Pierre Jarier	Penske-Ford	G	4	Ignition	21	
Ret	7	(United Kingdom) John Watson	Brabham-Alfa Romeo	G	2	Damage / Oil Leak	8	
Ret	2	(West Germany) Jochen Mass	McLaren-Ford	G	0	Accident	14	
DNQ	27	(Belgium) Patrick Nève	March-Ford	G				
DNQ	37	(Italy) Arturo Merzario	March-Ford	G				
DNQ	18	(Australia) Vern Schuppan	Surtees-Ford	G				
DNQ	39	(United Kingdom) Ian Ashley	Hesketh-Ford	G				
DNQ	33	(Netherlands) Boy Hayje	March-Ford	G				
DNQ	25	(Mexico) Héctor Rebaque	Hesketh-Ford	G				
DNQ	29	(Belgium) Teddy Pilette	BRM	G				
DNQ	32	(Netherlands) Michael Bleekemolen	March-Ford	G				

== Notes ==
- This was the Formula One World Championship debut for Dutch driver Michael Bleekemolen.
- This was the 5th podium finish for Ligier.
- This was the 6th Dutch Grand Prix win for Ferrari. It broke the previous record set by Lotus at the 1970 Dutch Grand Prix.

== Championship standings after the race ==
Drivers' Championship standings

Pos	Driver	Points
1	(Austria) **Niki Lauda***	63
2	(South Africa) **Jody Scheckter***	42
3	(Argentina) **Carlos Reutemann***	35
4	(United States) **Mario Andretti***	32
5	(United Kingdom) James Hunt	22

Constructors' Championship standings

Pos	Constructor	Points
1	(Italy) **Ferrari***	80 (82)
2	(United Kingdom) **Lotus-Ford***	47
3	(Canada) Wolf-Ford	42
4	(United Kingdom) McLaren-Ford	35
5	(United Kingdom) Brabham-Alfa Romeo	27

- Note: Only the top five positions are included for both sets of standings. Only the best 8 results from the first 9 races and the best 7 results from the remaining 8 races were retained. Numbers without parentheses are retained points; numbers in parentheses are total points scored.
- Competitors in bold and marked with an asterisk still had a theoretical chance of becoming World Champion.

Previous race: 1977 Austrian Grand Prix	FIA Formula One World Championship; 1977 season	Next race: 1977 Italian Grand Prix
Previous race: 1976 Dutch Grand Prix	Dutch Grand Prix	Next race: 1978 Dutch Grand Prix
