= 1977 South African Grand Prix =

Formula One motor race held in 1977

- Race 3 of 17 in the 1977 Formula One season
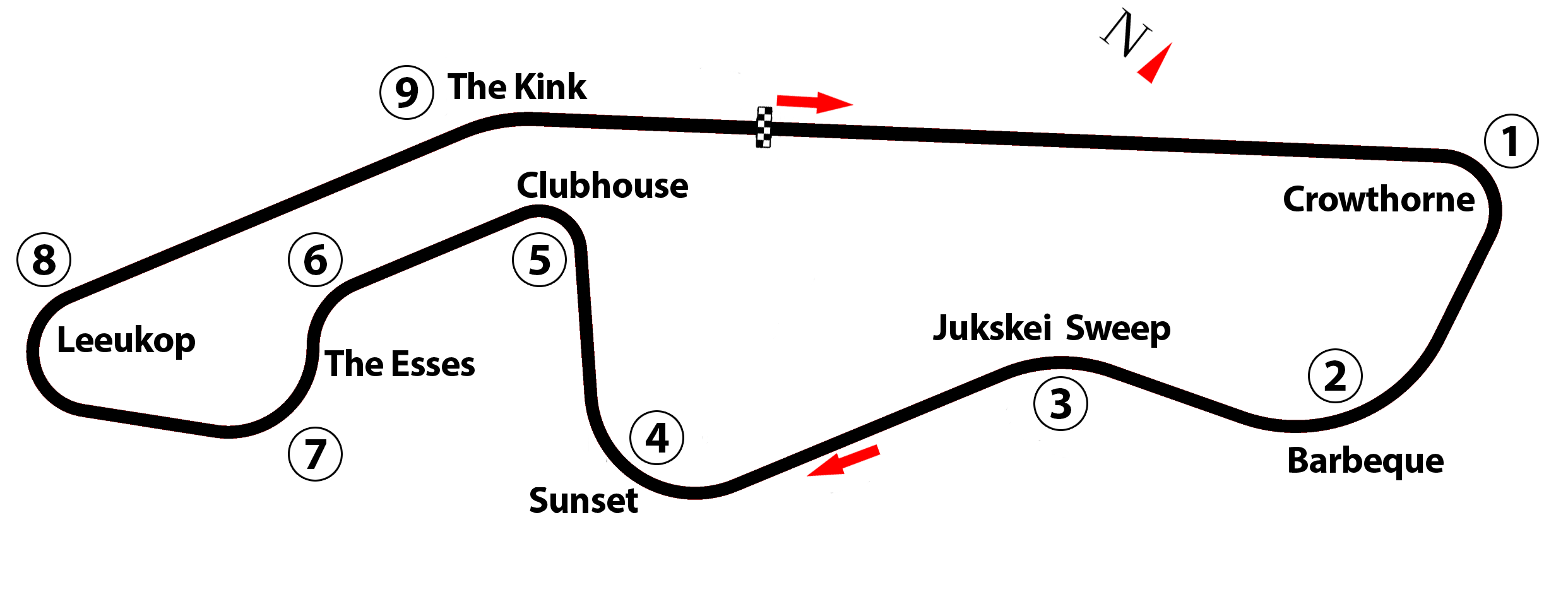

Race details
- Date: 5 March 1977
- Official name: XXIII The Citizen Grand Prix of South Africa
- Location: Kyalami; Transvaal Province, South Africa
- Course: Permanent racing facility
- Course length: 4.104 km (2.550 miles)
- Distance: 78 laps, 320.112 km (198.908 miles)
- Weather: Sunny

Pole position
Driver	(United Kingdom) James Hunt	McLaren-Ford
- Time: 1:15.96

Fastest lap
Driver	(United Kingdom) John Watson	Brabham-Alfa Romeo
- Time: 1:17.63 on lap 7

Podium
First	(Austria) Niki Lauda	Ferrari
Second	(South Africa) Jody Scheckter	Wolf-Ford
Third	(France) Patrick Depailler	Tyrrell-Ford

The 1977 South African Grand Prix (formally the XXIII The Citizen Grand Prix of South Africa) was a Formula One motor race held at Kyalami on 5 March 1977, won by Niki Lauda of Austria. The race is principally remembered for the accident that resulted in the deaths of race marshal Frederik Jansen van Vuuren and driver Tom Pryce. It was also the last race for Carlos Pace, who was killed in an aircraft accident less than two weeks later.

== Practice sessions ==
The first two practice sessions were wet, and only a dozen cars took part in the first session, with Hans-Joachim Stuck fastest in his March despite having to abandon the session with an oil pressure issue. Eighteen cars took to the track during the second session, with Tom Pryce fastest in the Shadow despite brake problems. Three drivers did not take part in either timed session thus far: Patrick Depailler, Pryce's team-mate Renzo Zorzi (engine) and Boy Hayje.

The last timed session was dry, and therefore all the qualifying times came from this session. James Hunt took his third consecutive pole position, with Carlos Pace beside him on the front row. Niki Lauda took third despite a broken seat and tyre problems, alongside Depailler, ahead of Ronnie Peterson. Mario Andretti was sixth despite an engine failure. Other drivers who experienced mechanical problems included Jochen Mass (handling), Vittorio Brambilla (engine), Hans Binder (engine), Pryce (engine), Zorzi (fuel metering unit, electrics, exhaust), Alex Ribeiro (handling), Hayje (brakes) and Larry Perkins (water pump), while Brett Lunger only managed one flying lap before his engine failed.

== Race ==
=== Start and first 21 laps ===
James Hunt led off at the start, with Niki Lauda and local driver Jody Scheckter following him after Carlos Pace struggled. Tom Pryce lost ground at the start, leaving him 22nd, ahead only of Larry Perkins, although he quickly gained places, climbing to 16th by the end of lap six. On the same lap Ronnie Peterson dropped out while eighth, with a fuel pressure problem. The order at the front stayed put until lap seven when Lauda took the lead and was never passed again, with Scheckter taking second from Hunt 11 laps later.

=== Lap 22 fatal incident ===
On lap 22, the Shadow-Ford of Italian driver Renzo Zorzi, running 19th, pulled off to the left side of the main straight, just after the brow of a hill and a bridge over the track. He was again having problems with his fuel metering unit, and fuel was pumping directly onto the engine, which then caught fire. Zorzi did not immediately get out of his car as he could not disconnect the oxygen pipe from his helmet. (Note: Oxygen pipes were used to prevent drivers being suffocated if they were trapped in the car in a fire.)

The situation caused two marshals from the pit wall on the opposite side of the track to intervene. The first marshal to cross the track was a 25-year-old panel beater named William (Bill). The second was 19-year-old Frederik "Frikkie" Jansen van Vuuren, who was carrying a 40-pound (18 kg) fire extinguisher. George Witt, the chief pit marshal for the race, said that the policy of the circuit was that in case of fire, two marshals must attend and a further two act as back-up in case the first pair's extinguishers were not effective enough. Witt also recalled that both marshals crossed the track without prior permission. The former narrowly made it across the track, but the latter did not. As the two men started to run across the track, the cars driven by Hans-Joachim Stuck (12th) and Tom Pryce (13th) came over the brow of a rise in the track.

"As we got to the top I suddenly sensed this marshal running across the track from my right, carrying an extinguisher. I took a big chance and I don't know how I got away with it. There was no time, I just reacted on pure instinct."

— Hans-Joachim Stuck

Pryce was directly behind Stuck's car along the main straight. Stuck saw Jansen van Vuuren and moved to the right to avoid both marshals, missing Bill by what journalist David Tremayne called "millimetres". From his position Pryce could not see Jansen van Vuuren and was unable to react as quickly as Stuck had done. He struck the teenage marshal at approximately 270 km/h (170 mph). Jansen van Vuuren was thrown into the air and landed in front of Zorzi and Bill. He died on impact, and his body was badly mutilated by Pryce's car - so much so that Vuuren was only identified the following day—by process of elimination—when the race director summoned all the race stewards from the previous day and Vuuren was not among them. The fire extinguisher he had been carrying smashed into Pryce's head, before striking the Shadow's roll hoop. The force of the impact was such that the extinguisher was thrown up and over the adjacent grandstand. It landed in the car park to the rear of the stand, where it hit a parked car and jammed its door shut.

The impact with the fire extinguisher wrenched Pryce's helmet upward sharply. Death was almost certainly instantaneous. Pryce's Shadow DN8, now with its driver dead at the wheel, continued at speed down the main straight towards the first corner, called Crowthorne. The car left the track to the right, scraping the metal barriers, hitting an entrance for emergency vehicles, and veering back onto the track. It then hit 14th-placed Jacques Laffite's Ligier, sending both Pryce and Laffite head-on into the catch fencing and a concrete wall.

=== Finish ===
Lauda's Ferrari was barely able to finish the race after his car had picked up part of Pryce's roll bar in the underside of its monocoque, after the fatal accident. This damaged the car's water system and at the end of the race, the team found that only a third of the usual twelve litres of water remained in the system. Both the warnings for oil pressure and water temperature had been flashing at Lauda for the final 25 laps, in a car which he later described as 'completely finished'.

Despite this, Lauda held on to win his first victory since his near-fatal crash at the 1976 German Grand Prix the previous year. South African Scheckter was second, and Patrick Depailler's six-wheeler took third from Hunt in the closing laps. At first Lauda announced it was the greatest victory of his career, but when told on the victory podium of Pryce's death, he said that "there was no joy after that".

=== Aftermath ===
The sport reacted with sorrow at the loss of two young men. Tyrrell mechanic Trevor Foster viewed the incident from a distance, later recalling

I can remember quite vividly [Pryce's] teammate's car had already pulled off to the side of the track and it had started a small fire. Then the next thing I can remember is seeing Tom's car coming down the straight. I can almost remember now a momentary lift of the throttle much earlier than you would have expected and I looked and I saw something fly up from the car, which tragically turned out to be the marshal.

David Tremayne, a veteran biographer and motor sports journalist, recalled the feelings of disbelief and horror following the aftermath of the incident;

The tragedy itself – the sheer randomness of it – is so hard to take and still is. You tend to focus your anger on someone and for a long time it would be focused on a 19-year-old kid, called Jansen van Vuuren, who ran across the track.

The event was included in the motor racing film The Quick and the Dead.

== Classification ==
=== Qualifying classification ===
Pos.	Driver	Constructor	Time	No
1	James Hunt	McLaren-Ford	1:15,96	1
2	Carlos Pace	Brabham-Alfa Romeo	1:16,01	2
3	Niki Lauda	Ferrari	1:16,29	3
4	Patrick Depailler	Tyrrell-Ford	1:16,33	4
5	Jody Scheckter	Wolf-Ford	1:16,35	5
6	Mario Andretti	Lotus-Ford	1:16,38	6
7	Ronnie Peterson	Tyrrell-Ford	1:16,44	7
8	Carlos Reutemann	Ferrari	1:16,54	8
9	Emerson Fittipaldi	Fittipaldi-Ford	1:16,64	9
10	Gunnar Nilsson	Lotus-Ford	1:16,65	10
11	John Watson	Brabham-Alfa Romeo	1:16,71	11
12	Jacques Laffite	Ligier-Matra	1:16,74	12
13	Jochen Mass	McLaren-Ford	1:16,99	13
14	Vittorio Brambilla	Surtees-Ford	1:17,08	14
15	Tom Pryce	Shadow-Ford	1:17,11	15
16	Clay Regazzoni	Ensign-Ford	1:17,21	16
17	Alex Ribeiro	March-Ford	1:17,44	17
18	Hans-Joachim Stuck	March-Ford	1:17,49	18
19	Hans Binder	Surtees-Ford	1:18,07	19
20	Renzo Zorzi	Shadow-Ford	1:18,42	20
21	Boy Hayje	March-Ford	1:19,59	21
22	Larry Perkins	BRM	1:21,77	22
23	Brett Lunger	March-Ford	1:24,35	23

=== Race classification ===
Pos	No	Driver	Constructor	Laps	Time/Retired	Grid	Points
1	11	(Austria) Niki Lauda	Ferrari	78	1:42:21.6	3	9
2	20	(South Africa) Jody Scheckter	Wolf-Ford	78	+ 5.2	5	6
3	4	(France) Patrick Depailler	Tyrrell-Ford	78	+ 5.7	4	4
4	1	(United Kingdom) James Hunt	McLaren-Ford	78	+ 9.5	1	3
5	2	(West Germany) Jochen Mass	McLaren-Ford	78	+ 19.9	13	2
6	7	(United Kingdom) John Watson	Brabham-Alfa Romeo	78	+ 20.2	11	1
7	19	(Italy) Vittorio Brambilla	Surtees-Ford	78	+ 23.6	14	
8	12	(Argentina) Carlos Reutemann	Ferrari	78	+ 26.7	8	
9	22	(Switzerland) Clay Regazzoni	Ensign-Ford	78	+ 46.2	16	
10	28	(Brazil) Emerson Fittipaldi	Fittipaldi-Ford	78	+ 1:11.7	9	
11	18	(Austria) Hans Binder	Surtees-Ford	77	+ 1 Lap	19	
12	6	(Sweden) Gunnar Nilsson	Lotus-Ford	77	+ 1 Lap	10	
13	8	(Brazil) Carlos Pace	Brabham-Alfa Romeo	76	+ 2 Laps	2	
14	30	(United States) Brett Lunger	March-Ford	76	+ 2 Laps	23	
15	14	(Australia) Larry Perkins	BRM	73	+ 5 Laps	22	
Ret	9	(Brazil) Alex Ribeiro	March-Ford	66	Engine	17	
Ret	10	(West Germany) Hans-Joachim Stuck	March-Ford	55	Engine	18	
Ret	5	(United States) Mario Andretti	Lotus-Ford	43	Accident	6	
Ret	33	(Netherlands) Boy Hayje	March-Ford	33	Gearbox	21	
Ret	26	(France) Jacques Laffite	Ligier-Matra	22	Accident	12	
Ret	16	(United Kingdom) Tom Pryce	Shadow-Ford	22	Fatal accident	15	
Ret	17	(Italy) Renzo Zorzi	Shadow-Ford	21	Fuel Leak	20	
Ret	3	(Sweden) Ronnie Peterson	Tyrrell-Ford	5	Fuel System	7	

== Championship standings after the race ==
Drivers' Championship standings

	Pos	Driver	Points
1	1	(South Africa) Jody Scheckter	15
1	2	(Argentina) Carlos Reutemann	13
3	3	(Austria) Niki Lauda	13
	4	(United Kingdom) James Hunt	9
2	5	(Brazil) Carlos Pace	6

Constructors' Championship standings

	Pos	Constructor	Points
	1	(Italy) Ferrari	22
	2	(Canada) Wolf-Ford	15
1	3	(United Kingdom) McLaren-Ford	9
1	4	(United Kingdom) Brabham-Alfa Romeo	7
	5	(Brazil) Fittipaldi-Ford	6

- Note: Only the top five positions are included for both sets of standings.

== Sources ==
- Dalglish, Geoff (2012). Lost and Found: From Racecar Driver to Pilgrim, from Soweto to Findhorn. Findhorn Press. ISBN 978-1-84409-591-9.

Previous race: 1977 Brazilian Grand Prix	FIA Formula One World Championship; 1977 season	Next race: 1977 United States Grand Prix West
Previous race: 1976 South African Grand Prix	South African Grand Prix	Next race: 1978 South African Grand Prix
