= BRM P207 =

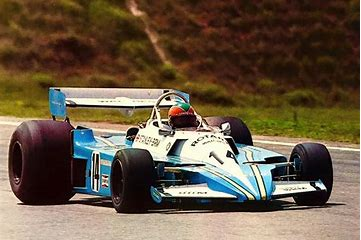
- Category: Formula One
- Constructor: British Racing Motors
- Designer: Len Terry
- Predecessor: P201
- Successor: P230

Technical specifications
- Chassis: Aluminium alloy monocoque
- Suspension (front): Double wishbones, coil springs
- Suspension (rear): Double wishbones, coil springs
- Axle track: F: 1,422 mm (56.0 in); R: 1,486 mm (58.5 in)
- Wheelbase: 2,642 mm (104.0 in)
- Engine: BRM 2,998 cc (182.9 cu in) V12 naturally aspirated, mid-mounted
- Transmission: BRM T193 5-speed manual
- Weight: 615 kg (1,356 lb)
- Fuel: FINA
- Tyres: Goodyear

Competition history
- Notable entrants: Stanley BRM; Rotary Watches Stanley BRM
- Debut: 1977 Brazilian Grand Prix
Races	Wins	Poles	F/Laps
9	0	0	0
- Constructors' Championships: 0
- Drivers' Championships: 0
- Unless otherwise stated, all data refer to Formula One World Championship Grands Prix only.

The BRM P207 was a Formula One racing car, designed by Len Terry and constructed by British Racing Motors, which raced in the 1977 Formula One season. It was powered by a 3.0-litre V12 engine, with a claimed output of 488bhp. London-based Swiss watchmakers Rotary Watches provided sponsorship money. The car failed to score any points during the season. The team made a total of nine entries during the season, but only qualified in one instance, at the 1977 Brazilian Grand Prix. Driven by Larry Perkins, the car retired on lap one due to overheating. Its qualifying time was six seconds slower than that of the second-to-last starter. One British journalist in Brazil exclaimed that he was ashamed of being British. The car failed to appear at the season opening Argentine Grand Prix because it was too wide to fit in the hold of the aircraft that was going to transport it to South America.

The P207 was also BRM's last entry in the Formula One World Championship. In 1978, a second P207 was entered in the domestic Aurora F1 Championship with Teddy Pilette driving. He finished thirteenth in the series with one fourth- and one fifth-placed finish. Both P207s survive, and have appeared in historic racing.

The last Formula One BRM was the P230 of 1979: intended for the Aurora series, it was never raced.

== Complete Formula One World Championship results ==
(key)

Year	Entrant	Engines	Tyres	Drivers	1	2	3	4	5	6	7	8	9	10	11	12	13	14	15	16	17	Points	WCC
1977	Stanley BRM	BRM V12	G		ARG	BRA	RSA	USW	ESP	MON	BEL	SWE	FRA	GBR	GER	AUT	NED	ITA	USA	CAN	JPN	—	0
1977	Stanley BRM	BRM V12	G	Larry Perkins		Ret																—	0
1977	Stanley BRM	BRM V12	G	Conny Andersson					DNQ		DNQ	DNQ	DNQ									—	0
1977	Stanley BRM	BRM V12	G	Guy Edwards										DNPQ								—	0
1977	Stanley BRM	BRM V12	G	Teddy Pilette											DNQ		DNQ	DNQ				—	0
