= LEC Refrigeration Racing =

Motor racing team

LEC
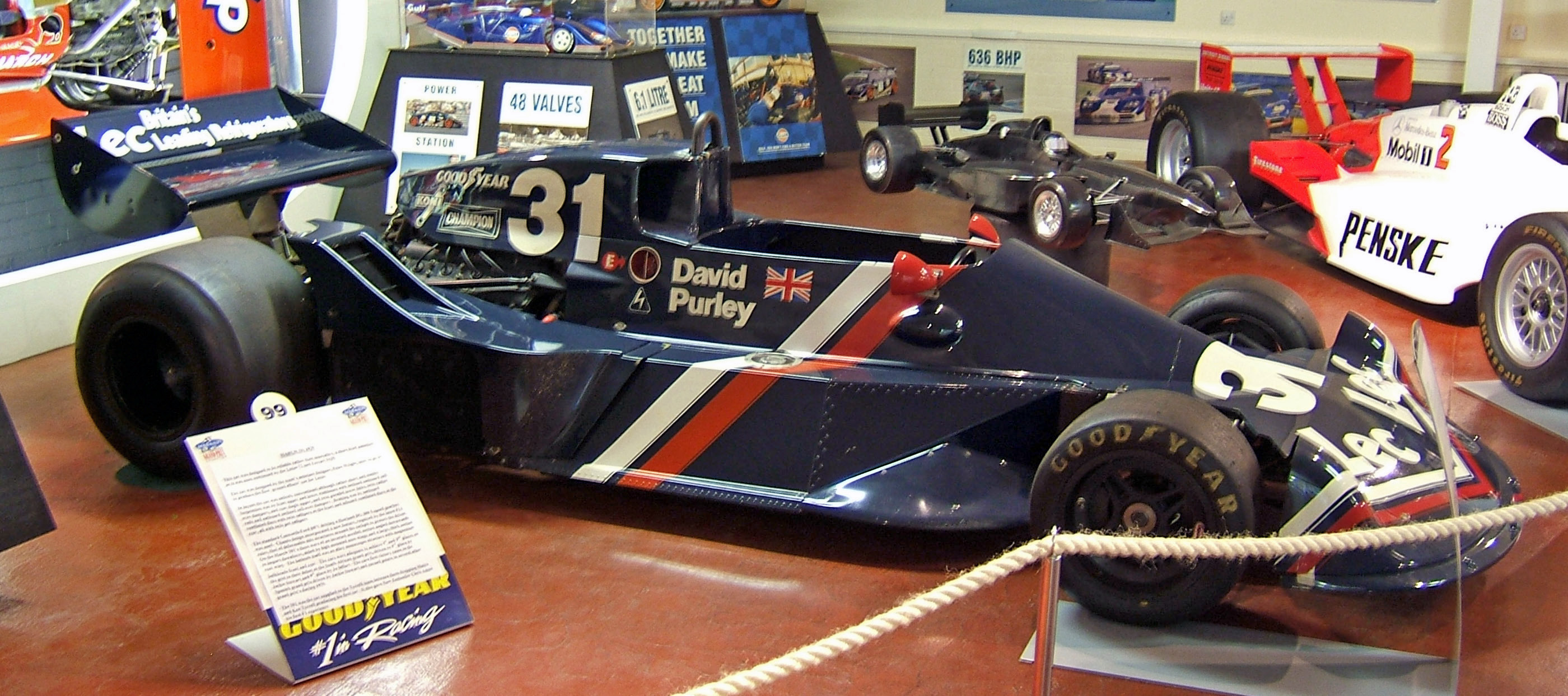
- Full name: LEC Refrigeration Racing
- Founder(s): David Purley
- Noted staff: Mike Earle
- Noted drivers: (United Kingdom) David Purley

Formula One World Championship career
- First entry: 1973 Monaco Grand Prix
- Races entered: 10
- Engines: Cosworth
- Race victories: 0
- Points: 0
- Pole positions: 0
- Fastest laps: 0
- Final entry: 1977 British Grand Prix

LEC Refrigeration Racing was a UK motor racing team and Formula One constructor based at Bognor Regis, West Sussex. They participated in ten Grands Prix using a March in 1973 and their own car, the LEC CRP1, in 1977.

== Formula One ==
=== 1973 ===
In 1973 David Purley hired a March 731 and with backing from his family's refrigeration company LEC Refrigeration, made a largely unsuccessful attempt at Formula One. Purley and the team made their debut in Monaco where the fuel tank broke. Purley did not make the restart at the British GP after he spun off. It was at the 1973 Dutch Grand Prix, however, where Purley carried out arguably his most memorable actions. Upon witnessing a crash which left fellow British driver Roger Williamson trapped in his overturned and burning car, Purley abandoned his own race and attempted to save Williamson, who was participating in only his second Formula One race. Purley later recalled that upon arriving at the scene, he heard Williamson crying for help as the fire began to take hold. Purley's efforts to right the car and extinguish the flames were in vain as he received no help from nearby track marshals or emergency workers, in spite of attempts to encourage them, and other passing drivers, to come to his aid; Williamson died from asphyxiation. Because the marshals were not wearing fire resistant clothing and the passing drivers believed that Purley was attempting to extinguish his own car, having escaped a fiery crash unharmed; they had no idea that a second driver was involved. The team took their first finish at the German GP. Purley also finished in Italy.

=== 1977 ===
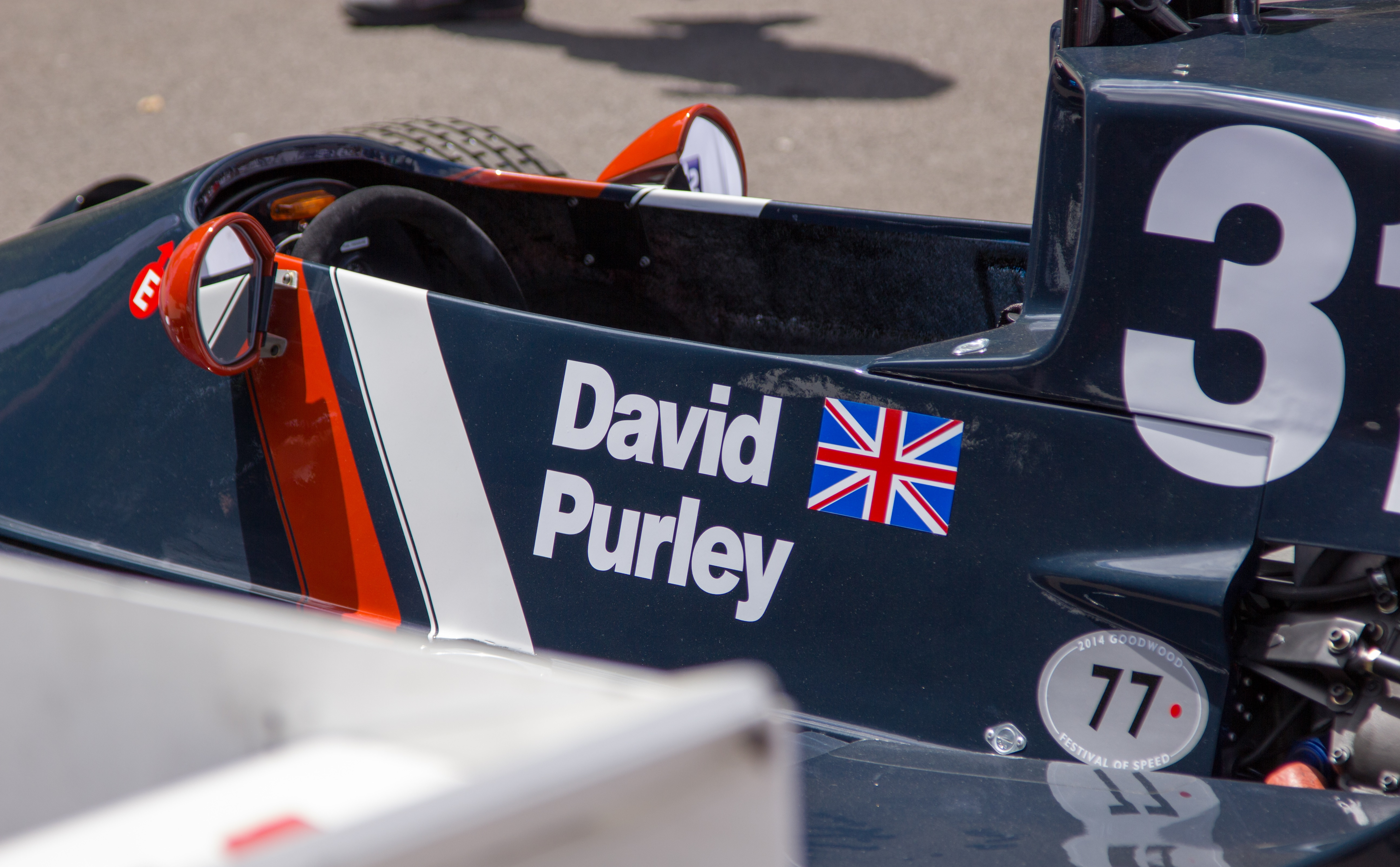
Cockpit of the CRP1

LEC racing returned to Formula One in 1977 with their own LEC chassis designed by Mike Pilbeam and run by Mike Earle. The CRP1 was a conservative design but without major faults; it would have qualified in its first race (Spain 1977) based on times set early Saturday morning, but since there was no official timing it did not make the cut-off, due to a series of minor problems later in the day.

It was this car in which Purley suffered serious injuries in an accident during pre-qualifying for that year's British Grand Prix. He survived an estimated 179.8 g when he decelerated from 173 km/h (108 mph) to 0 in a distance of 66 cm (26 inches) after his throttle got stuck wide open and he hit a wall. For many years, this was thought to be the highest g-force ever survived by a human being. He suffered multiple fractures to his legs, pelvis and ribs.

The second CRP1 has been restored and has competed in historic Formula One racing alongside a modern replica built by WKD Motorsport.

== Formula One World Championship results ==
(key)

Year	Chassis	Engine	Tyres	Driver	1	2	3	4	5	6	7	8	9	10	11	12	13	14	15	16	17	Points	WCC
1973	March 731	Cosworth DFV 3.0 V8	G		ARG	BRA	RSA	ESP	BEL	MON	SWE	FRA	GBR	NED	GER	AUT	ITA	CAN	USA			—	0
1973	March 731	Cosworth DFV 3.0 V8	G	(United Kingdom) David Purley						Ret			DNS	Ret	15		9					—	0
1977	LEC CRP1	Cosworth DFV 3.0 V8	G		ARG	BRA	RSA	USW	ESP	MON	BEL	SWE	FRA	GBR	GER	AUT	NED	ITA	USA	CAN	JPN	—	0
1977	LEC CRP1	Cosworth DFV 3.0 V8	G	(United Kingdom) David Purley					DNQ		13	14	Ret	DNPQ								—	0

== Formula One Non-Championship results ==
(key)

Year	Chassis	Engine	Driver	1	2	3	4	5	6
1972	Connew PC1	Ford Cosworth DFV 3.0 V8	(United Kingdom) David Purley	ROC	BRA	INT	OUL	REP	VIC; DNS
1975	Chevron B30	Ford GAA 3.4 V6	(United Kingdom) David Purley	ROC; 11	INT	SUI			
1977	LEC CRP1	Ford Cosworth DFV 3.0 V8	(United Kingdom) David Purley	ROC; 6					

== European F5000 Championship results ==
(key)

Year	Chassis	Engine	Driver	1	2	3	4	5	6	7	8	9	10	11	12	13	14	15	16	Pos.	Pts
1975	Chevron B30	Ford GAA 3.4 V6	(United Kingdom) David Purley	BRH; 2	OUL; 3	BRH; 1	SIL; DNS	ZOL; NC	ZAN; Ret	THR; Ret	SNE; Ret	MAL; Ret	THR; 5	BRH; Ret	OUL; 1	SIL; 2	SNE; NC	MAL; 5	BRH; Ret	5th	98

== Shellsport International Series results ==
(key)

Year	Chassis	Engine	Driver	1	2	3	4	5	6	7	8	9	10	11	12	13	Pos.	Pts
1976	Chevron B30	Ford GAA 3.4 V6	(United Kingdom) David Purley	MAL; 1	SNE; 4	OUL; 4	BRH; 2	THR; 1	BRH; 1	MAL; 1	SNE; 6	BRH; 1	THR; Ret	OUL; 5	BRH; 8	BRH; 1	1st	188

== British Formula One Championship results ==
(key)

Year	Chassis	Engine	Driver	1	2	3	4	5	6	7	8	9	10	11	12	13	14	15	Pos.	Pts
1979	LEC CRP1	Ford Cosworth DFV 3.0 V8	(United Kingdom) David Purley	ZOL	OUL	BRH	MAL	SNE	THR	ZAN	DON	OUL	NOG	MAL	BRH; Ret	THR; 10			17th	4
1979	Shadow DN9	Ford Cosworth DFV 3.0 V8	(United Kingdom) David Purley														SNE; 4	SIL; 9	17th	4
