= David Purley =

British racing driver (1945–1985)

- Born: 26 January 1945; Bognor Regis, Sussex, United Kingdom
- Died: 2 July 1985 (aged 40); English Channel, close to Bognor Regis, United Kingdom

Formula One World Championship career
- Nationality: (United Kingdom) British
- Active years: 1973–1974, 1977
- Team(s): LEC, Token; Non-works March
- Entries: 11 (7 starts)
- Championships: 0
- Wins: 0
- Podiums: 0
- Career points: 0
- Pole positions: 0
- Fastest laps: 0
- First entry: 1973 Monaco Grand Prix
- Last entry: 1977 British Grand Prix

David Charles Purley, GM (26 January 1945 – 2 July 1985) was a British racing driver born in Bognor Regis, West Sussex, who participated in 11 Formula One World Championship Grands Prix, debuting at Monaco in 1973.

Purley is best known for his actions at the 1973 Dutch Grand Prix, where he abandoned his own race and attempted to save the life of fellow driver Roger Williamson, whose car was upside down and on fire following a serious accident. Purley was awarded the George Medal for his courage in trying to save Williamson, who suffocated in the blaze.

During pre-qualifying for the 1977 British Grand Prix, Purley sustained multiple bone fractures after his car's throttle stuck open and he crashed into a wall. His deceleration from 108 mph (173 km/h) to 0 in a distance of 26 inches (66 cm) is one of the highest G-loads survived in a crash (180 G). He scored no championship points during his Formula One career. He died in a plane crash, having retired from motorsport and taken up aerobatics, in 1985.

== Early life ==
Purley's father was Charles Purley, the founder of LEC Refrigeration. Birth and death records show that his father's name was originally Puxley but he preferred the name Purley. His mother was Welsh, having been born in the small village of Cwmfelinfach. David went to school at Seaford College and then Dartington Hall School in Devon.

== Career ==
Purley joined the British Army and was an Officer Cadet at Sandhurst on Intake 38. Commissioned into the Parachute Regiment, his parachute failed to open on a training jump. Miraculously, he landed on his Platoon Sergeant's parachute and both survived the heavy landing. Having seen action with his Battalion in Aden, he left the Army to pursue a career in motor racing.

Purley later raced in various series with an AC Cobra and a Chevron, before racing in Formula Three, winning three times at Chimay between 1970 and 1972.

In 1972, Purley was one of two drivers to attempt to race the Connew Grand Prix car in its original Formula One configuration. He was entered at the end of season World Championship Victory Race at Brands Hatch but did not start. Purley had asked for an electrical "kill" switch to be fitted to the steering wheel, but this malfunctioned on the warm up lap, the engine stopped, and the car was retired.

In 1973, Purley hired a March and with backing from his family's refrigeration company he made an attempt at Formula One.

External videos
- Footage of Purley attempting to save Roger Williamson trapped in his overturned and burning car on YouTube

At the 1973 Dutch Grand Prix, upon witnessing a crash which left fellow British driver Roger Williamson trapped in his overturned and burning car, Purley abandoned his own race and attempted to save Williamson, who was participating in only his second Formula One race. Purley later recalled that upon arriving at the scene, he heard Williamson crying for help as the fire began to take hold. Purley's efforts to right the car and extinguish the flames were in vain as he received no help from nearby track marshals or emergency workers, in spite of attempts to encourage them, and other passing drivers, to come to his aid; Williamson died from asphyxiation. The marshals were not wearing fire resistant clothing and the passing drivers assumed that Purley was attempting to extinguish his own car, having escaped a fiery crash unharmed.

A sequence of pictures taken by photographer Cor Mooij of the accident won the Photo Sequences category of that year's World Press Photo. Later, Purley was awarded the George Medal for his rescue attempt. The story, and film footage of the rescue attempt, feature in a 2010 BBC documentary titled Grand Prix: The Killer Years.

Apart from a one-off participation with Token at his home Grand Prix in 1974, Purley stayed out of Formula One for a few years, preferring to compete in Formula Two driving Chevrons and Marches for Hong Kong-based millionaire Bob Harper, and Formula 5000 where he won the British Championship in 1976 in a Chevron powered by the Cosworth GA 3.4-litre V6 engine. In 1974 Purley won the Brighton Speed Trials driving a Trojan-Chevrolet T101, winning again the following year in a Chevron-GA B30.

Purley returned to Formula One in 1977 with his own LEC chassis designed by Mike Pilbeam and run by Mike Earle. It was this car in which he suffered serious injuries in an accident during practice for that year's British Grand Prix. He survived an estimated 179.8 g when he decelerated from 108 mph (173 km/h) to 0 in a distance of 26 inches (66 cm) after his throttle became stuck wide open and he hit a wall.

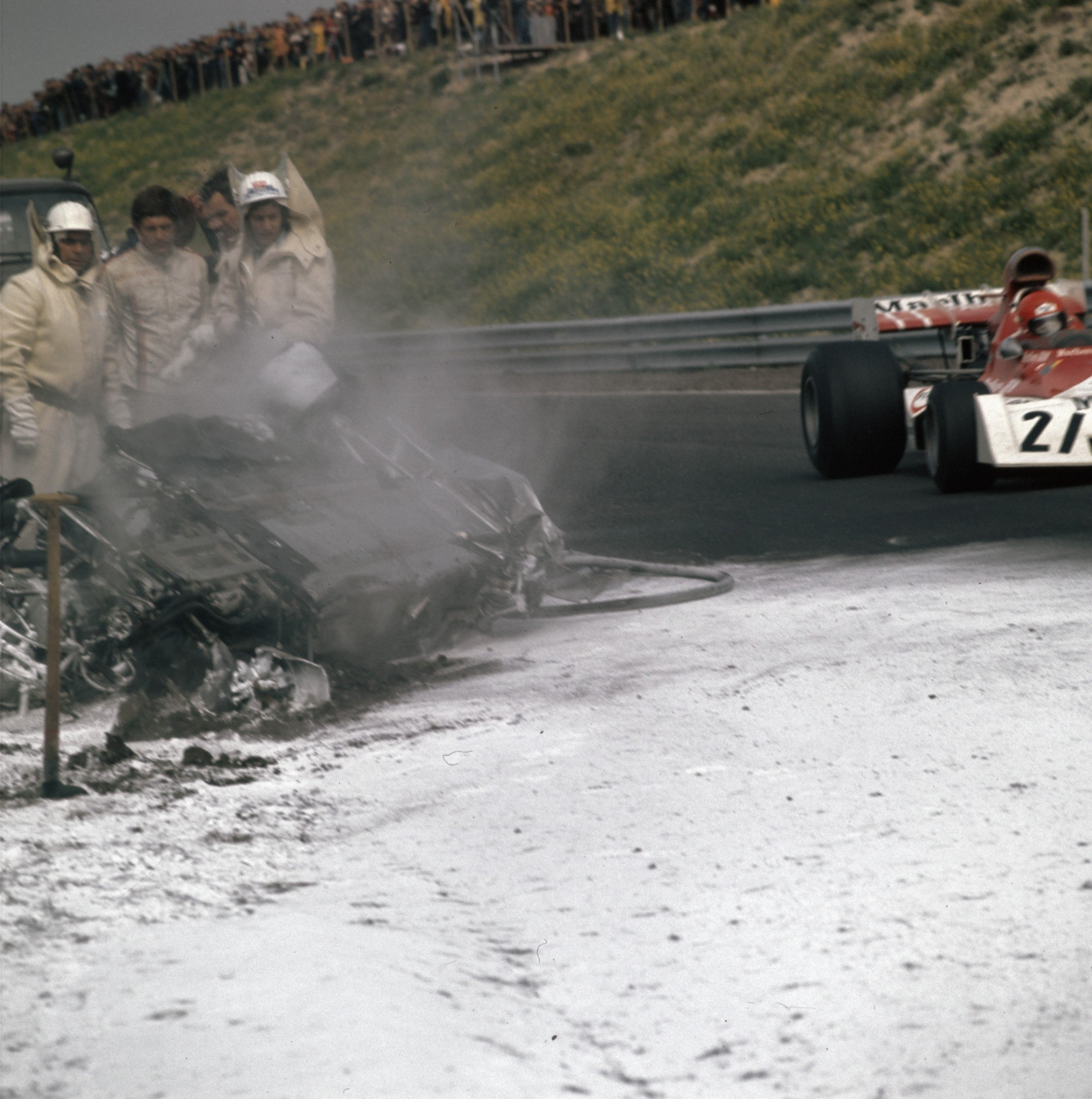
The burned wreckage of Williamson's March 731, with Purley standing second left

Purley recovered to race again, although he confined his activities to the minor Aurora AFX series of Formula One races in Britain. As a result of his earlier accident, Purley's left leg was shorter than his right and he underwent innovative corrective surgery in Belgium, from which he again took several months to recover.

Following his decision to quit motorsport, Purley moved into competition aerobatics.

== Death ==
Purley died on 2 July 1985 when his Pitts Special aerobatic biplane crashed into the English Channel off Bognor Regis. He is buried in the churchyard of St. Nicholas Church, West Itchenor, near Chichester.

== Legacy ==
The remains of Purley's crashed LEC CRP1 and its replacement were displayed at the Donington Grand Prix Exhibition until 2011. The second car has since been restored and now competes in historic Formula One racing, alongside a replica car built more recently.

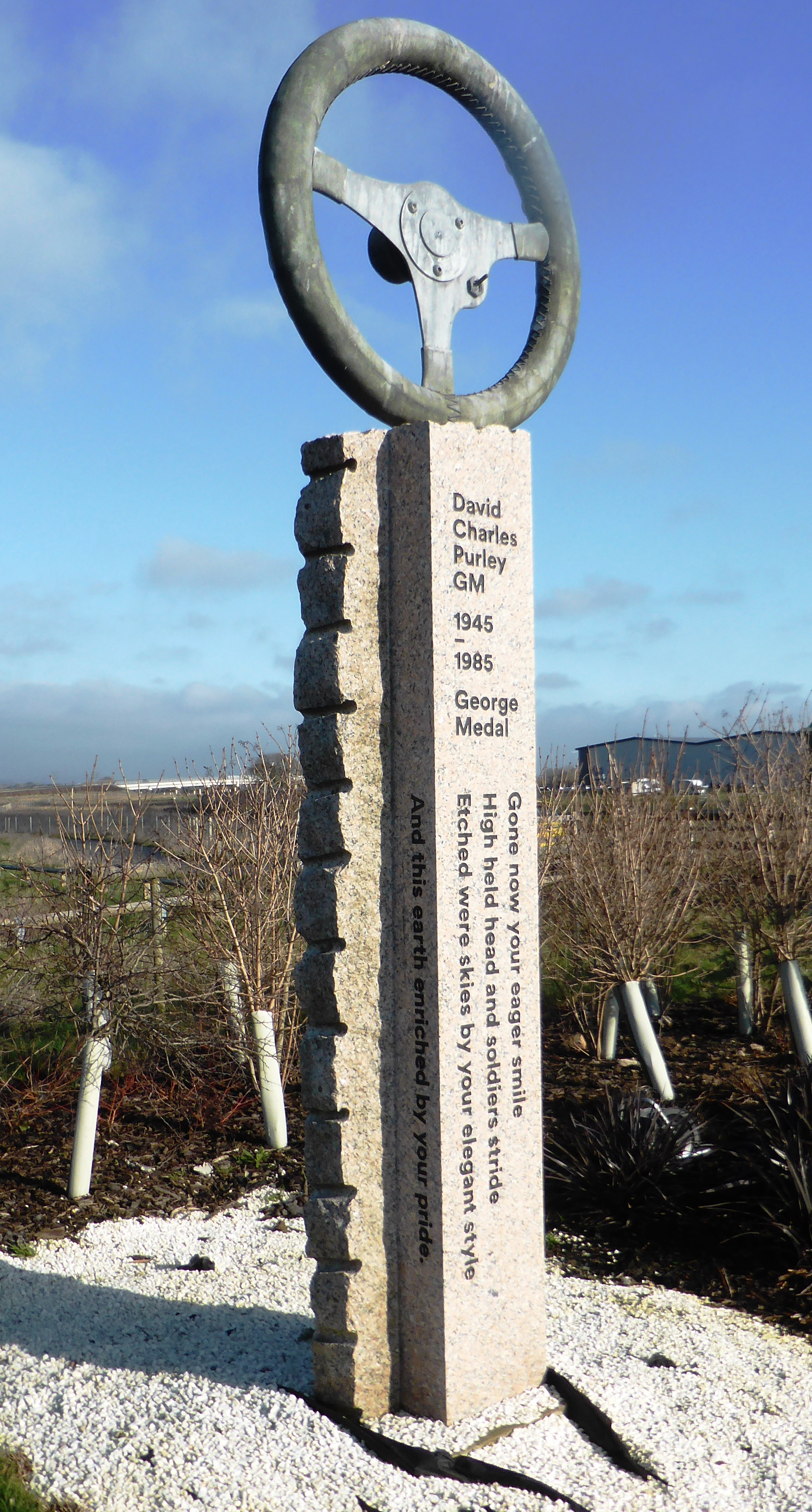
Memorial to racing driver David Purley GM 1945-1985

A David Purley memorial, in the form of a sculpture by the British artist Gordon Young, was erected in 2017 close to the site of the former LEC factory in Bognor Regis. It is inscribed with the words that appear on the headstone of his grave at Itchenor: "Gone now your eager smile, high held head and soldier's stride, etched were skies by your elegant style, and this earth enriched by your pride".

== Racing record ==
=== Complete European Formula Two Championship results ===
(key)

Year	Entrant	Chassis	Engine	1	2	3	4	5	6	7	8	9	10	11	12	13	14	Pos.	Pts
1972	LEC Refrigeration Racing	March 722	Ford	MAL; 8	THR; Ret	HOC; DNS	PAU; 3	PAL; Ret	HOC; Ret	ROU; NC	ÖST; 12	IMO; Ret	MAN; DNQ	PER	SAL	ALB; DNQ	HOC	19th	4
1974	Team Harper	March 742	BMW	BAR	HOC; NC	PAU; 7												5th	13
1974	Team Harper	Chevron B27	Ford				SAL; 2		MUG; Ret									5th	13
1974	Team Harper	Chevron B27	BMW					HOC; 14		KAR; Ret	PER; 2	HOC; 11	VAL; 10					5th	13
1975	Masami Kuwashima Racing	March 752	BMW	EST	THR	HOC	NÜR	PAU	HOC; Ret	SAL	ROU	MUG	PER	SIL	ZOL	NOG	VAL	NC	0

=== Complete Formula One World Championship results ===
(key)

Year	Entrant	Chassis	Engine	1	2	3	4	5	6	7	8	9	10	11	12	13	14	15	16	17	WDC	Pts
1973	LEC Refrigeration Racing	March 731	Ford Cosworth DFV 3.0 V8	ARG	BRA	RSA	ESP	BEL	MON; Ret	SWE	FRA	GBR; DNS	NED; Ret	GER; 15	AUT	ITA; 9	CAN	USA			NC	0
1974	Token Racing	Token RJ02	Ford Cosworth DFV 3.0 V8	ARG	BRA	RSA	ESP	BEL	MON	SWE	NED	FRA	GBR; DNQ	GER	AUT	ITA	CAN	USA			NC	0
1977	LEC Refrigeration Racing	LEC CRP1	Ford Cosworth DFV 3.0 V8	ARG	BRA	RSA	USW	ESP; DNQ	MON	BEL; 13	SWE; 14	FRA; Ret	GBR; DNPQ	GER	AUT	NED	ITA	USA	CAN	JPN	NC	0

=== Complete Formula One Non-Championship results ===
(key)

Year	Entrant	Chassis	Engine	1	2	3	4	5	6
1972	LEC Refrigeration Racing	Connew PC1	Ford Cosworth DFV 3.0 V8	ROC	BRA	INT	OUL	REP	VIC; DNS
1975	LEC Refrigeration Racing	Chevron B30 (F5000)	Ford GAA 3.4 V6	ROC; 11	INT	SUI			
1977	LEC Refrigeration Racing	LEC CRP1	Ford Cosworth DFV 3.0 V8	ROC; 6					

=== Complete European F5000/British Formula One Championship results ===
(key) (Races in bold indicate pole position; races in italics indicate fastest lap.)

Year	Entrant	Chassis	Engine	1	2	3	4	5	6	7	8	9	10	11	12	13	14	15	16	Pos.	Pts
1975	LEC Refrigeration Racing	Chevron B30	Ford GAA 3.4 V6	BRH; 2	OUL; 3	BRH; 1	SIL; DNS	ZOL; NC	ZAN; Ret	THR; Ret	SNE; Ret	MAL; Ret	THR; 5	BRH; Ret	OUL; 1	SIL; 2	SNE; NC	**MAL**; 5	BRH; Ret	5th	98
1976	LEC Refrigeration Racing	Chevron B30	Ford GAA 3.4 V6	**MAL**; 1	SNE; 4	OUL; 4	BRH; 2	**THR**; 1	BRH; 1	**MAL**; 1	SNE; 6	**BRH**; 1	THR; Ret	OUL; 5	BRH; 8	BRH; 1				1st	188
1979	LEC Refrigeration Racing	LEC CRP1	Ford Cosworth DFV 3.0 V8	ZOL	OUL	BRH	MAL	SNE	THR	ZAN	DON	OUL	NOG	MAL	BRH; Ret	THR; 10				17th	4
1979	LEC Refrigeration Racing	Shadow DN9	Ford Cosworth DFV 3.0 V8														SNE; 4	SIL; 9		17th	4

== Books ==
- Tremayne, David (1991). Racers Apart: Memories of motorsport heroes. UK: Motor Racing Publications Ltd. p. 293. ISBN 0-947981-58-6.

Sporting positions
Preceded by Teddy Pilette (European F5000 Championship)	Shellsport International Series; Champion; 1976	Succeeded by Tony Trimmer
