= Conny Andersson (racing driver) =

Swedish racing driver (born 1939)

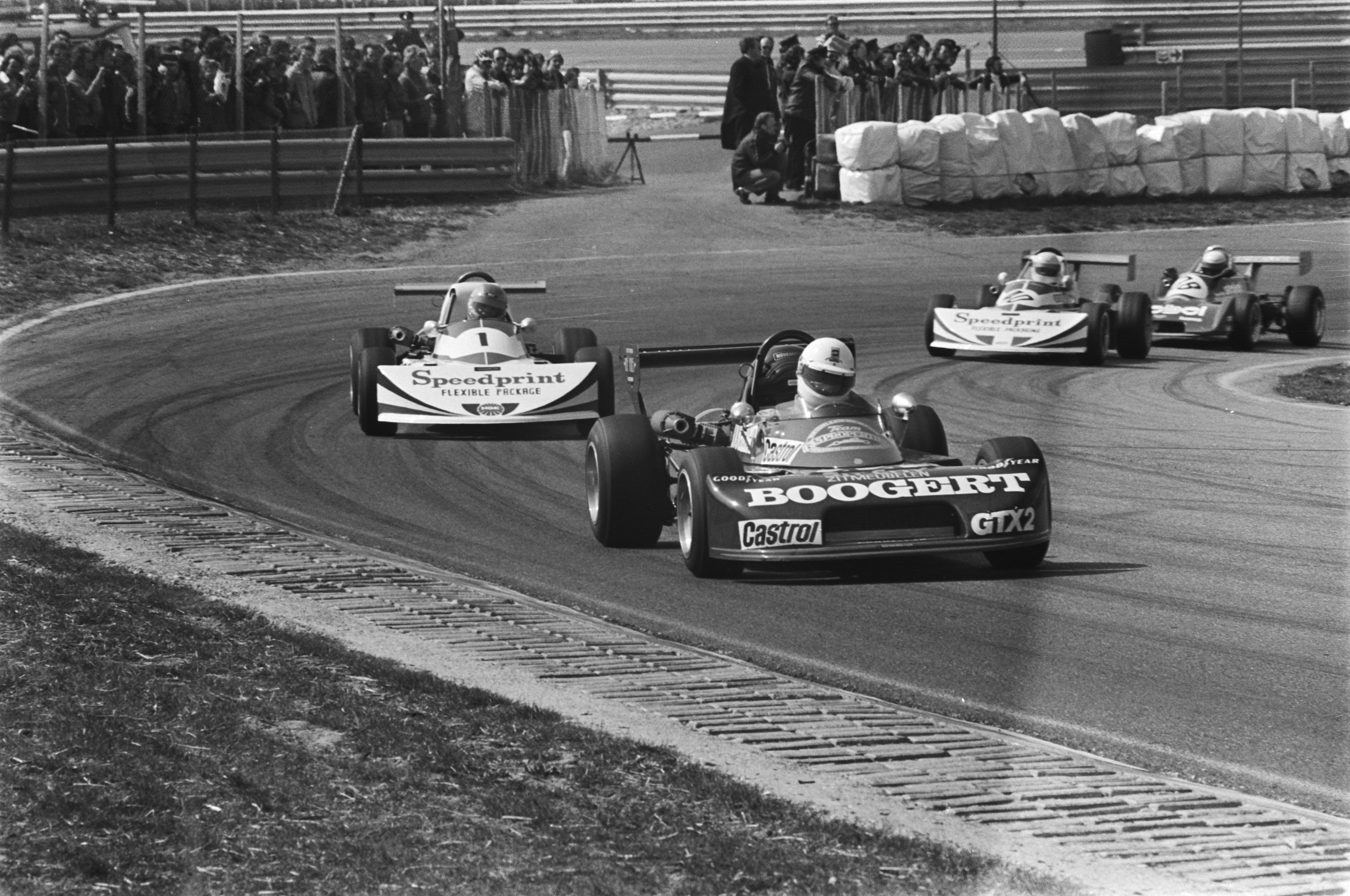
- Born: 28 December 1939 (age 86); Alingsås, Sweden

Formula One World Championship career
- Nationality: (Sweden) Swedish
- Active years: 1976 – 1977
- Team(s): Surtees, BRM
- Entries: 5 (1 start)
- Championships: 0
- Wins: 0
- Podiums: 0
- Career points: 0
- Pole positions: 0
- Fastest laps: 0
- First entry: 1976 Dutch Grand Prix
- Last entry: 1977 French Grand Prix

Conny Andersson (born 28 December 1939) is a Swedish former racing driver who participated in Formula One during 1976 and 1977 for the Surtees and BRM teams. Earlier, he was a motocross rider who competed in Formula Three racing as a privateer for almost ten years.

He won the 1974 Swedish Formula Three Championship and participated in the 1975 European Formula 3 Cup. The next season, he won four more races.

== Complete Formula One results ==
(key)

Year	Entrant	Chassis	Engine	1	2	3	4	5	6	7	8	9	10	11	12	13	14	15	16	17	WDC	Points
1976	Team Surtees	Surtees TS19	Cosworth V8	BRA	RSA	USW	ESP	BEL	MON	SWE	FRA	GBR	GER	AUT	NED; Ret	ITA	CAN	USA	JPN		NC	0
1977	Rotary Watches Stanley BRM	BRM P207	BRM V12	ARG	BRA	RSA	USW	ESP; DNQ	MON	BEL; DNQ	SWE; DNQ	FRA; DNQ	GBR	GER	AUT	NED	ITA	USA	CAN	JPN	NC	0

Sporting positions
Preceded by Torsten Palm	Swedish Formula Three Champion; 1972	Succeeded by Håkan Dahlqvist
Preceded by Håkan Dahlqvist	Swedish Formula Three Champion; 1974	Succeeded by Conny Ljungfeldt
