= Gunnar Nilsson =

Swedish racing driver (1948–1978)

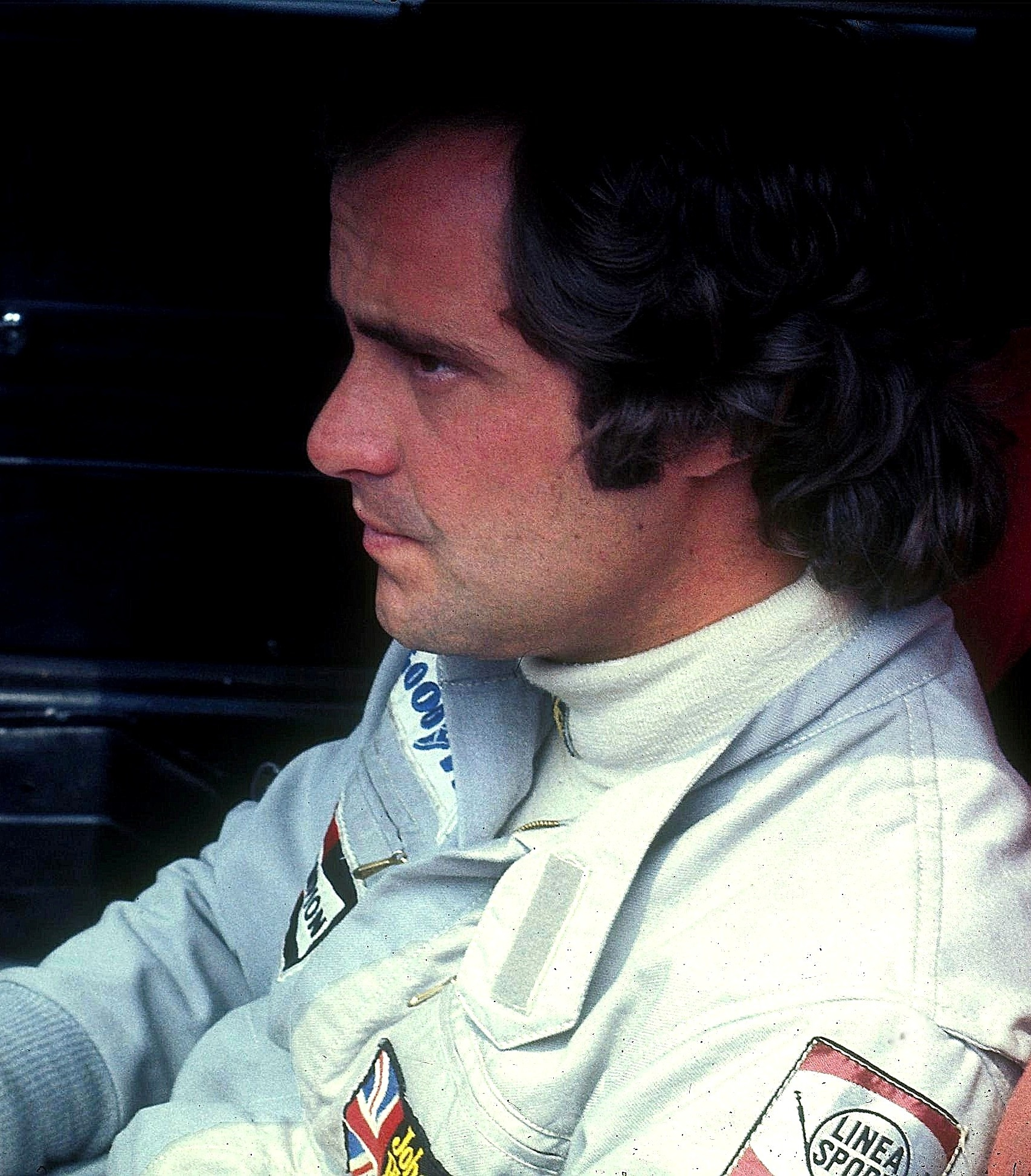
- Nilsson in 1976
- Born: Gunnar Axel Arvid Nilsson; 20 November 1948; Helsingborg, Sweden
- Died: 20 October 1978 (aged 29); Hammersmith, London, England

Formula One World Championship career
- Nationality: (Sweden) Swedish
- Active years: 1976–1977
- Team: Lotus
- Entries: 32 (31 starts)
- Championships: 0
- Wins: 1
- Podiums: 4
- Career points: 31
- Pole positions: 0
- Fastest laps: 1
- First entry: 1976 South African Grand Prix
- First win: 1977 Belgian Grand Prix
- Last entry: 1977 Japanese Grand Prix

Gunnar Axel Arvid Nilsson (20 November 1948 – 20 October 1978) was a Swedish racing driver, who competed in Formula One from 1976 to 1977. Nilsson won the 1977 Belgian Grand Prix with Lotus.

Born and raised in Helsingborg, Nilsson initially studied engineering at Stockholm University and served as a submarine radio officer in the Swedish Navy. Nilsson began his racing career in the late 1960s, progressing into Formula Super Vee in 1973 with Ecurie Bonnier. His junior formulae career culminated in his victory at the 1975 British Formula 3 Championship, in only his second season of Formula Three racing. Nilsson signed for Lotus in 1976, making his Formula One debut at the South African Grand Prix. Qualifying for every race in his rookie season, Nilsson scored podium finishes in Spain and Austria. Retaining his seat for 1977, Nilsson scored his maiden win at the Belgian Grand Prix, with a further podium at the British Grand Prix.

Having signed to Arrows for 1978, Nilsson was diagnosed with testicular cancer in December 1977, experiencing a rapid decline in health prior to his death ten months later. Outside of Formula One, Nilsson was a race-winner in both the World Sportscar and European Touring Car Championships with BMW. The Gunnar Nilsson Memorial Trophy was held in 1979, won by Alan Jones.

== Early life ==
Gunnar Axel Arvid Nilsson was born on 20 November 1948 in Helsingborg, the second son of a local building contractor. He attended school in his home town and went into the service as a submarine radio officer in the Swedish Navy. After leaving the navy, he studied engineering for four years at Stockholm University and gained a degree. It was hoped he would join the family business, but after eight months working as a supervisor in the construction industry; he left to start his own business.

Although his background and training was in construction, this held no attraction to Nilsson. Together with his associate, Dan Molin, they aimed to establish a transport business. This proved to be very successful and Nilsson continued to be a partner in the company, even when he became a full-time driver. He had seen the exploits of fellow Swedes; Ronnie Peterson and Reine Wisell and knew he wanted to be a racing driver.

== Junior formulae ==
Nilsson began racing in national events in Sweden, in the late 1960s. It was 1972, when he acquired a RPB Formula Vee car and set forth to learn the trade. This first season in Formula Vee saw him race just ten times, and included one race win at Mantorp Park. At the age of 26, he decided to try his hand and raced in Formula Super Vee series in 1973, with Ecurie Bonnier. Driving a Lola T252 alongside his teammate Freddy Kottulinsky, he would learn many valuable lessons from this seasoned campaigner. In his first race though, Nilsson finished third, and after a string of good performances, he finished fifth in the championship. He was clearly good as he stepped up to Formula Two, and promptly finished fourth in the Norisring-Trophäe, at the Norisring, in a Team Pierre Robert entered GRD-Ford 273, mainly due to misfortunes of others. One of these lessons learnt was that if he wanted to race at the top and with the best, his next step would be in Formula Three. It was while racing at Nürburgring that he was approached by Västkust-Stugan, who offered sponsorship for 1974.

== Formula Three/Formula Atlantic ==
With Västkust-Stugan help, a March 743 was acquired along with a Toyota engine. This would enable Nilsson to contest the Polifac Formula Three Championship. The results were as good as expected. He did score some second places, but victories and the season was punctuated by many spins and minor accidents. Nilsson did not go unnoticed and towards the middle of the season, he was given a drive with Team Västkuststugan, in their F2 March-BMW 732. Later in the season, he got another opportunity with Brian Lewis Racing, in their F2 March-BMW 732, where he did scored a fourth place in the second heat of the Preis von Baden-Württemberg und Hessen, at Hockenheim. This strong form in the German Formula Three series earned him a works March ride in the British series in 1975.

With the advantage of adequate pre-season testing and growing self-confidence, Nilsson scored his first F3 win in the season-opener at Thruxton. This was the catalyst for run of success that would see him win the B.A.R.C. BP Super Visco British F3 Championship, and included wins at Aintree, Ring Knutstorp, Snetterton and Silverstone. In winning the F3 support race at the British Grand Prix meeting, partly from winning the FOCA Trophy, he attracted the attention of Ted Moore of Rapid Movements Ltd., who signed Nilsson to race their Formula Atlantic Chevron. Gunnar had interspersed his success with some spectacular accidents, but with Ted Moore, he made no mistakes. Following a fourth place in his first Atlantic race, he would win the next five, four from pole position.

Nilsson's F3 and Formula Atlantic performances earned him a test in a Formula One car, driving a Williams FW03 at Goodwood at the end of the 1975 season. He impressed and was offered a contract for 1976, but turned it down in favour of an F2 drive with March which did not require a budget. However, after just one Grand Prix for Lotus, Nilsson's countryman Peterson decided he wanted to drive for March in Formula One. As part of this deal, March offered Nilsson to Lotus, where he joined Bob Evans, another new signing in the team to help develop their new car, Lotus 77.

== Grand Prix years ==
In all his Grands Prix, Nilsson only drove for Colin Chapman and his Team Lotus. He got his chance with the famous marque when Jacky Ickx and Ronnie Peterson abandoned ship when the Lotus 76 proved a disastrous replacement for the legendary Lotus 72. The replacement car for 1976, Lotus 77 was promising, meanwhile the team was undergoing big change at the time and Mario Andretti soon replaced Evans, the team was soon back on the way up, with Nilsson taking advantage of Andretti's experience.

Following Peterson's departure, Nilsson was thrown in at the deep end – racing the Lotus-Cosworth 77 in the South African Grand Prix. His debut was not an auspicious one; he qualified last of 25 drivers, in what was attributed to a bad car, which had caught fire during practice. The next was the non-championship, Race of Champions at Brands Hatch. This was more promising: he started from the second row of the grid and stormed into an immediate lead. However, his race only lasted to lap six, when the Cosworth DFV shed a plug lead. Before the other English non-championship race, the BRDC International Trophy, there was the small matter of the US GP West, around the street of Long Beach, California. He had survived a huge first turn accident, only for his rear suspension to break half a lap later, pitching him into the wall at 160 mph.

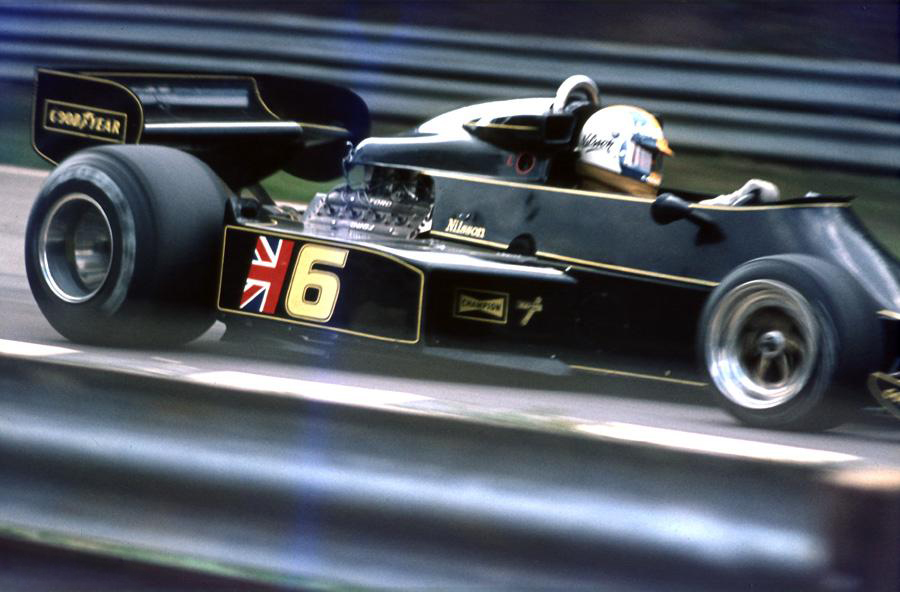
Nilsson in his Lotus 77, during the 1976 British Grand Prix

Nilsson's debut season saw a podium finish at only his third Grand Prix, the Gran Premio de España. He also scored another impressive third place in the Grand Prix von Österreich, fifth in Germany and sixth in Japan, but the rest of the season was marred by accidents – in Belgium, Sweden, and Holland – and by car failures – in Monaco, France, England, and at Watkins Glen.

For 1977, Lotus retained Nilsson alongside Andretti, and the pair worked on developing the new ground-effect Lotus 78. After a slow start to the season, as Andretti took over his car for the Argentine Grand Prix, Nilsson really got going at Jarama with a 5th place. Two races later, he took a magnificent win at the rain-soaked Zolder. As the race progressed, and the track dried, Nilsson suffered from a vibrating wheel nut, therefore he made a stop to have a tyre change. On these new tyres, he drove around the outside of Niki Lauda's Ferrari with 20 laps to go, to take the lead and stayed ahead to take victory. With further good results at Dijon-Prenois (4th) and Silverstone (3rd) Nilsson climbed the Championship standings. Come Autumn, his performance was blighted by poor qualifying efforts and there was a sudden downturn in his performances, retiring from all the last seven rounds of the Grand Prix season.

Nilsson's last appearance in a Formula One car, was at Fuji, where he drove an Imperial-liveried Lotus 78. Nilsson's last race was a lacklustre performance. Towards the end of the season, Nilsson's relationship with Chapman deteriorated to some extent, and with Peterson having signed to return to Team Lotus, he was on the way out at Lotus. By now, he was already experiencing symptoms of cancer. He would finish the season in eighth place with a total of twenty points. He might have scored more points but for a whole catalogue of accidents.

Nilsson signed to race for Arrows in 1978, in their debut season, but as it happened he did not have the health required to drive the car, and was forced to stand down before the first race. Rolf Stommelen was signed to replace him instead. As Nilsson got weaker, Andretti and Peterson raced to the World Championship.

== Away from Formula One ==
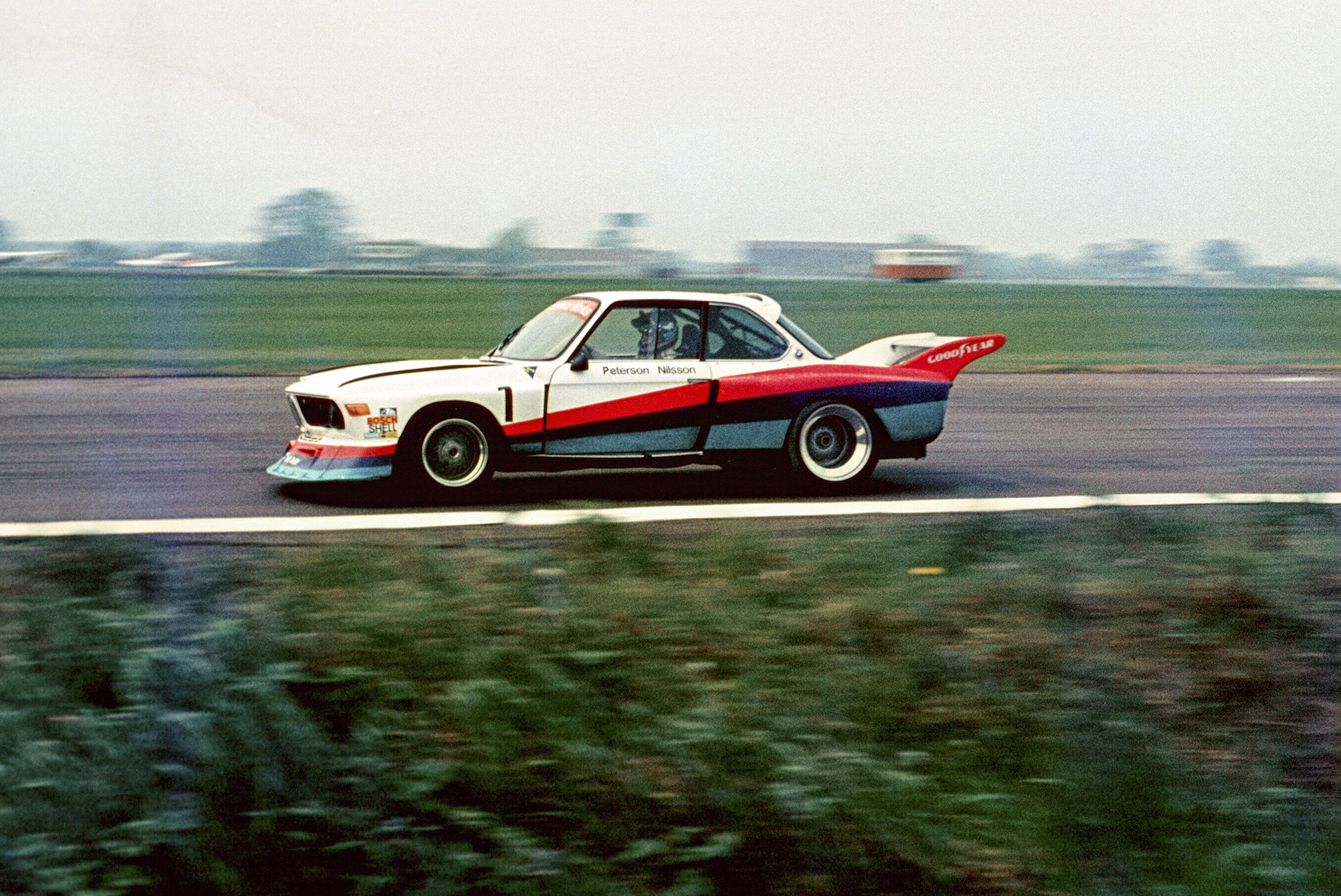
Nilsson and Peterson sharing a BMW 3.5 CSL in the 1976 Silverstone 6 Hours

Nilsson was versatile; having driven a BMW saloon in both the World Championship for Makes and European Touring Car Championship in 1976 and 1977. For 1977, he joined Dieter Quester in a BMW-Alpina to contest a limited number of races, taking the BMW 3.0 CSL to victory at Salzburgring and Nürburgring.

Nilsson briefly sampled American style oval racing in the International Race of Champions series, scoring a fifth at Michigan in September 1977. A month later, he followed this with two sixth places at Riverside, and expressed plenty of enthusiasm for this form of racing.

== Illness and death ==
In December 1977, during a routine check-up with a London doctor, Nilsson was informed he had testicular cancer. From then on, he experienced a rapid decline in health. At the Charing Cross Hospital, London, Nilsson was treated for his cancer by intensive radiotherapy. By July 1978, he was almost unrecognisable, having lost over 30kg in weight and all of his hair, but he still talked of a possible comeback. But the cancer had spread to his lymph nodes.

After resigning from Arrows, he dedicated his remaining months on founding and running the Gunnar Nilsson Cancer Foundation, linked to Charing Cross Hospital, declining pain-killing drugs so he could work as long as possible. The proceeds of a charity single released in the UK by George Harrison that included two songs, "Faster" and "Your Love Is Forever", from his 1979 album George Harrison, contributed to the fund. His death came just five weeks after that of fellow Swede, rival and friend, Ronnie Peterson, who died from complications to injuries suffered in a crash at Monza. Peterson's death deeply affected Nilsson, who attended the funeral. He returned to the Charing Cross hospital where he died five weeks later, on 20 October 1978, due to his cancer.

According to his obituary in The Times, "His rare talent had taken him swiftly to the top as No. 2 to Mario Andretti" "[and] he was perhaps the most naturally gifted of the new generation of grands prix drivers".

== Personality ==
Those who knew Nilsson described him as a warm, energetic character with a love of life. His enthusiasm and confidence made him naturally persuasive, which F3 teammate Alex Ribeiro attributed to helping him progress in his early career. Even in later years as his condition worsened in hospital, he was an entertaining character to medical staff and convinced them to break certain rules for him, such as placing a telephone in his room.

Despite this outwardly friendly persona, Nilsson's true character was complex. He could become quite solitary and would sometimes detach himself from social situations, so that few people became truly close to him. His contemporaries attributed this to the lack of a father figure in his life, Nilsson's father having died when he was young.

Nilsson grew particularly close to Danny Sullivan after racing together in F3, eventually sharing a flat in London. The friendship continued and Sullivan was among those attending to his increasing needs toward the end of his life. He formed a strong student/teacher relationship with Lotus teammate Mario Andretti, who regarded Nilsson as his first true friend among racing drivers. He learnt from Andretti during their two years together, but inevitably felt the need to establish himself as a driver in his own right – this played a part in his decision to sign with Arrows for 1978.

== Racing record ==
=== Career summary ===
Season	Series	Team	Position	Ref.
1973	Formel Super Vau GTX	Ecurie Bonnier	6th	
1973	Formel Super Vau GTX	Ecurie Bonnier	6th	
1973	European Formula Two	Team Pierre Robert	13th	
1974	German Formula Three	Reine Wisell Racing Canon	8th	
1975	British Formula Three	March Engineering Ltd.	**1st**	
1975	British Formula Atlantic	Rapid Movements Ltd.-Ted Moore	2nd	
1975	Swedish Formula Three	March Engineering Ltd.	5th	
1975	British Formula Atlantic	Rapid Movements Ltd.-Ted Moore	12th	
1976	Formula One	John Player Team Lotus	10th	
1976	European Touring Car	Luigi Racing	10th	
1977	Formula One World	John Player Team Lotus	8th	
1977	European Touring Car	BMW-Alpina	11th	
1977–78	International Race of Champions	—N/a	10th	

=== Complete European Formula Two Championship results ===
(key) (Races in bold indicate pole position; races in italics indicate fastest lap)

Year	Entrant	Chassis	Engine	1	2	3	4	5	6	7	8	9	10	11	12	13	14	15	16	17	Pos	Pts
1973	Team Pierre Robert	GRD 273	Ford	MAL	HOC	THR	NUR	PAU	KIN	NIV	HOC	ROU	MON	MAN	KAR	ENN	SAL	NOR; 4	ALB	VLL	12th	6
1974	Team Västkuststugan	March 732	BMW	MON	HOC	PAU	SAL	HOC	MUG	KAR; Ret	ENN		VLL								NC	0
1974	Brian Lewis Racing	March 732	BMW									HOC; 15									NC	0

=== Complete Formula One World Championship results ===
(key) (Races in italics indicate fastest lap)

Year	Entrant	Chassis	Engine	1	2	3	4	5	6	7	8	9	10	11	12	13	14	15	16	17	WDC	Points
1976	John Player Team Lotus	Lotus 77	Cosworth V8	BRA	RSA; Ret	USW; Ret	ESP; 3	BEL; Ret	MON; Ret	SWE; Ret	FRA; Ret	GBR; Ret	GER; 5	AUT; 3	NED; Ret	ITA; 13	CAN; 12	USA; Ret	JPN; 6		10th	11
1977	John Player Team Lotus	Lotus 78	Cosworth V8	ARG; DNS	BRA; 5	RSA; 12	USW; 8	ESP; 5	MON; Ret	BEL; 1	SWE; 19	FRA; 4	GBR; 3	GER; Ret	AUT; Ret	NED; Ret	ITA; Ret	USA; Ret	CAN; Ret	JPN; Ret	8th	20

=== Formula One non-championship results ===
(key) (Races in bold indicate pole position) (Races in italics indicate fastest lap)

Year	Entrant	Chassis	Engine	1	2
1976	John Player Team Lotus	Lotus 77	Cosworth V8	ROC; 8	INT; 6

=== International Race of Champions ===
(key) (Bold – Pole position. * – Most laps led.)

International Race of Champions results
Year	Make	1	2	3	4	Pos.	Points	Ref
1977–78	Chevy	MCH; 5	MCH; 6	RSD; 6	DAY	10th	$7,500	

Sporting positions
Preceded by Brian Henton	British Formula 3 Championship; BARC Series Champion; 1975	Succeeded by Rupert Keegan
