= GB1 =

GB1 or variant, may refer to:

- GB-1, a WWII U.S. Army Air Force glide bomb
- Gb1 domain, of the G protein
- Game Composites GB1 GameBird, a British single-engine two-seat acrobatic aircraft
- Ghostbusters (1984), the first film in the series
- BRM Hepworth GB-1, British sports car

== See also ==
- GBI (disambiguation)
- GBL (disambiguation)
- GB (disambiguation)
- 1GB
