= GBI =

GBI or gbi may refer to:

== Languages ==
- Galela language (ISO 639-3: gbi), native to Indonesia
- Gbi language, native to the Central African Republic and South Sudan
- Gbii language, native to Liberia
- Gbin language (Gbĩ), an extinct language of Ivory Coast

== Organizations ==
- Genius Brands International, former name of the American entertainment company Kartoon Studios
- Georgia Bureau of Investigation, the chief law enforment agency of the U.S. state of Georgia
- Gereja Bethel Indonesia, a group of Christian Pentecostal churches in Indonesia
- Green Building Initiative, a nonprofit headquartered in Portland, Oregon
- Gulf Bridge International, a Middle Eastern subsea cable operator

== Places ==
- Gbi & Doru District, Nimba County, Liberia
- Kalaburagi Airport (IATA: GBI), India

== Science and technology ==
- Green Bank Interferometer, a radio telescope in West Virginia
- General Behavior Inventory, a psychological test
- Genetic brain injury, a category of brain damage

== Music ==
- G.B.I., a side-project by Dave Grohl, Charlie Benante and Scott Ian
- "GBI (German Bold Italic)", a song by Towa Tei featuring Kylie Minogue

== Other uses ==
- Great bodily injury, an offence in US criminal law; for example see California Penal Code#Notable section numbers
- Ground-Based Interceptor, an American anti-ballistic missile system
- General Building Inspector of the Reich Capital, a Nazi office held by Albert Speer

== See also ==
- GB1 (disambiguation) (disambiguation)
- GBL (disambiguation)
