= GBL =

GBL may refer to:

== Sports ==
- Golden Baseball League, a defunct North American league
- Greater Boston League, a defunct high school athletic conference in Massachusetts, United States
- Greater Brisbane League, a baseball league in Queensland, Australia
- Greek Basket League, in Greece

== Companies ==
- GAMCO Investors, an American financial services company
- GB Airways, a defunct British airline
- Georgian Bay Line, a defunct American steamship operator
- Groupe Bruxelles Lambert, a Belgian holding company

== Other uses ==
- Gainsborough Lea Road railway station, in England
- Game Based Learning
- Game Boy Light, a Japan-exclusive Nintendo handheld
- Gamit language
- gamma-Butyrolactone
- Garden-based learning
- Glenn A. Black Laboratory of Archaeology, at Indiana University

== See also ==
- GB1 (disambiguation)
- GBI (disambiguation)
