= BRM P230 =

- Category: Formula One
- Constructor: British Racing Motors
- Designer: Aubrey Woods
- Predecessor: P207

Technical specifications
- Chassis: Aluminium alloy monocoque
- Suspension (front): Double wishbones, coil springs
- Suspension (rear): Double wishbones, coil springs
- Axle track: F: 1,422 mm (56.0 in); R: 1,486 mm (58.5 in)
- Wheelbase: 2,642 mm (104.0 in)
- Engine: BRM 2,998 cc (182.9 cu in) V12 naturally aspirated, mid-mounted
- Transmission: BRM T193 5-speed manual
- Weight: 615 kg (1,356 lb)
- Fuel: FINA
- Tyres: Goodyear

Competition history
- Notable entrants: Stanley BRM; Rotary Watches Stanley BRM
- Notable drivers: (United Kingdom) Neil Bettridge
Races	Wins	Poles	F/Laps
0	0	0	0
- Constructors' Championships: 0
- Drivers' Championships: 0

The BRM P230 was an open-wheel Formula One racing car, designed and developed by Aubrey Woods, and built by British constructor BRM, for the 1979 Aurora AFX F1 1979 British Formula One Championship, but never raced. It was due to be driven by Neil Bettridge, and like its predecessor was going to be powered by a nearly 500 hp (370 kW) BRM V12 engine, and run on Goodyear tyres. It later became the basis for the unraced BRM Hepworth GB-1 Can-Am car.
