= 1977 Spanish Grand Prix =

- Race 5 of 17 in the 1977 Formula One season

Race details
- Date: 8 May 1977
- Official name: XXIII Gran Premio de España
- Location: Jarama, Spain
- Course: Permanent racing facility
- Course length: 3.404 km (2.115 miles)
- Distance: 75 laps, 255.3 km (158.63 miles)

Pole position
| Driver | (United States) Mario Andretti | Lotus-Ford |
- Time: 1:18.70

Fastest lap
| Driver | (France) Jacques Laffite | Ligier-Matra |
- Time: 1:20.81 on lap 5

Podium
| First | (United States) Mario Andretti | Lotus-Ford |
| Second | (Argentina) Carlos Reutemann | Ferrari |
| Third | (South Africa) Jody Scheckter | Wolf-Ford |

The 1977 Spanish Grand Prix was a Formula One motor race held on 8 May 1977 at the Circuito del Jarama near Madrid, Spain. It was the fifth race of the 1977 World Championship of F1 Drivers and the 1977 International Cup for F1 Constructors.

The 75-lap race was won from pole position by American driver Mario Andretti, driving a Lotus-Ford. Argentinian Carlos Reutemann finished second in a Ferrari, with South African Jody Scheckter third in the Wolf WR1.

== Background ==
The Spanish Grand Prix marked the F1 season's return to Europe. The race marked the debut of the Williams Grand Prix Engineering team, entering a single March 761 chassis for Belgian driver Patrick Nève, and for LEC. It was also Rupert Keegan's first race, and ended up being Renzo Zorzi's final Grand Prix. This was the 100th Grand Prix start for March Engineering.

Several teams including Surtees, Ensign, and Lotus were using Hewland's new, six-speed FGA400-6 transmission. The new transmission was not shifting very well, though, with second speed in particular being hard to find. Several teams' new cars and updated engines proved slower than earlier designs, including Tyrrell's 1977 P34, Ligier's new Matra MS76 engine, Wolf's second chassis, and McLaren's new M26. There were 24 places on the grid, and 31 entries.

== Qualifying ==
Mario Andretti continued his recent form with pole position, 0.72 seconds ahead of Jacques Laffite who sprung somewhat of a surprise in his Ligier JS7, beating the not fully sorted Ferraris thanks to the powerful Matra V12 engine. Lauda narrowly pipped his teammate Reutemann in the final qualifying session, but both drivers suffered from understeer in high-speed turn and insufficient turn-in at lower speeds. The Brabhams of John Watson and Hans-Joachim Stuck had issues with brake cooling all weekend, understeer, and transmission kinks.

David Purley's Lec had a great start during free practice, setting times which would have put the new car on the grid. During the timed practice, however, he suffered a series of minor mechanical issues which kept him off the grid. Jean-Pierre Jarier had an unlucky weekend, being unable to qualify due to food poisoning. Swedish veteran F3-driver Conny Andersson took over from Larry Perkins in the BRM P207. While the V12 engine sounded glorious, it was no indication of the car's performance, with Andersson's best lap time being five-and-a-half seconds down on Andretti's. Local hero Emilio de Villota had managed to put together the funds to obtain a works-spec McLaren M23 thanks to Iberia airlines and got the second-to-last place on the grid, just ahead of Renzo Zorzi's Shadow. This was the first time a Spaniard started a Grand Prix since Alex Soler-Roig at the Spanish Grand Prix four years earlier.

== Race ==
During the Sunday morning pre-race open practice, Niki Lauda pulled over due to a broken rib. Two hours later he officially withdrew, allowing Brett Lunger to start; he was the first reserve, having been the fastest of those who did not qualify. At the start, Andretti took the lead with Laffite following, then Reutemann, and then Hunt who had a great start. However, Hunt's new McLaren M26 was misfiring and he had to pit on the fifth lap. The car still did not run (nor handle) well and after ten laps his race was over. Jody Scheckter's Wolf car was the second chassis built by the young team (who also brought a third chassis), but he had a bad start because of an engine which did not run cleanly. To keep the engine from misfiring, he revved it too high at the start, making it hard to get into first gear and damaging the clutch in the process, which gave him minor trouble throughout the race. After a bad start he managed to pass Regazzoni's Ensign and caught up to Watson's Brabham.

Laffite gave chase to Andretti in the early stages but had to pit on the eleventh lap with a loose wheel nut, dropping him down to 19th, a lap down on Andretti. This left Andretti to romp to victory with Carlos Reutemann second, neither of them ever threatened. Laffite's inspired climb through the field provided lots of entertainment, however, passing Ronnie Peterson's Tyrrell late in the race to finish in seventh place.

With Laffite and Hunt out of the way, John Watson gained third place with Scheckter on his tail, followed by Jochen Mass and Gunnar Nilsson who were battling each other, followed by Peterson, and then Keegan and Alan Jones. Newcomer Keegan had a strong race; he was in eighth place when he overcooked it and crashed on the 32nd lap. Jones caught up to Peterson and eventually made it past and into seventh on the 56th lap, only to immediately place his car in the barrier on the very next turn. Watson lost two places due to a spin and retired with fuel system problems with ten laps left in the race, leaving Jody Scheckter to take the final spot on the podium. Mass, who had an uneventful race, finished in fourth, followed by Nilsson and Hans-Joachim Stuck who took the final point ahead of Laffite and Peterson. Peterson drove in the latest P34, while his teammate Depailler used a newly built car to the 1976 specifications, as the revised car had not proved to be an improvement. Depailler's race ended with engine problems after twelve laps, however, while Ronnie had an uninspired race in which he spent most of his time holding off attacks from his rear.

Clay Regazzoni's race ended on lap nine, after a follhardy passing attempt by Vittorio Brambilla put both of their cars out of the race. Villota ended in 13th, five laps down on the winner, in what was to be the best result of his Formula One career.

== Classification ==
=== Qualifying ===
| Pos | No | Driver | Constructor | Time/Gap |
|---|---|---|---|---|
| 1 | 5 | (United States) Mario Andretti | Lotus–Ford | 1:18.70 |
| 2 | 26 | (France) Jacques Laffite | Ligier–Matra | +0.72 |
| 3 | 11 | (Austria) Niki Lauda | Ferrari | +0.78 |
| 4 | 12 | (Argentina) Carlos Reutemann | Ferrari | +0.82 |
| 5 | 20 | (South Africa) Jody Scheckter | Wolf–Ford | +0.87 |
| 6 | 7 | (United Kingdom) John Watson | Brabham–Alfa Romeo | +1.17 |
| 7 | 1 | (United Kingdom) James Hunt | McLaren–Ford | +1.41 |
| 8 | 22 | (Switzerland) Clay Regazzoni | Ensign–Ford | +1.43 |
| 9 | 2 | (West Germany) Jochen Mass | McLaren–Ford | +1.44 |
| 10 | 4 | (France) Patrick Depailler | Tyrrell–Ford | +1.46 |
| 11 | 19 | (Italy) Vittorio Brambilla | Surtees–Ford | +1.56 |
| 12 | 6 | (Sweden) Gunnar Nilsson | Lotus–Ford | +1.68 |
| 13 | 8 | (West Germany) Hans-Joachim Stuck | Brabham–Alfa Romeo | +1.85 |
| 14 | 17 | (Australia) Alan Jones | Shadow–Ford | +2.04 |
| 15 | 3 | (Sweden) Ronnie Peterson | Tyrrell–Ford | +2.26 |
| 16 | 24 | (United Kingdom) Rupert Keegan | Hesketh–Ford | +2.33 |
| 17 | 10 | (South Africa) Ian Scheckter | March–Ford | +2.35 |
| 18 | 25 | (Austria) Harald Ertl | Hesketh–Ford | +2.46 |
| 19 | 28 | (Brazil) Emerson Fittipaldi | Fittipaldi–Ford | +2.86 |
| 20 | 18 | (Austria) Hans Binder | Surtees–Ford | +3.03 |
| 21 | 37 | (Italy) Arturo Merzario | March–Ford | +3.12 |
| 22 | 27 | (Belgium) Patrick Nève | March–Ford | +3.22 |
| 23 | 36 | (Spain) Emilio de Villota | McLaren–Ford | +3.27 |
| 24 | 16 | (Italy) Renzo Zorzi | Shadow–Ford | +3.39 |
Cut-off
| 25 | 30 | (United States) Brett Lunger (Note: Lunger was the first reserve and started the race after Lauda's entry was withdrawn) | March–Ford | +3.54 |
| 26 | 34 | (France) Jean-Pierre Jarier | Penske–Ford | +3.57 |
| 27 | 9 | (Brazil) Alex Ribeiro | March–Ford | +3.60 |
| 28 | 33 | (Netherlands) Boy Hayje | March–Ford | +3.69 |
| 29 | 38 | (United Kingdom) Brian Henton | March–Ford | +3.87 |
| 30 | 31 | (United Kingdom) David Purley | LEC–Ford | +4.19 |
| 31 | 35 | (Sweden) Conny Andersson | BRM | +5.59 |

=== Race ===
| Pos | No | Driver | Constructor | Chassis | Laps | Time/Retired | Grid | Points |
|---|---|---|---|---|---|---|---|---|
| 1 | 5 | (United States) Mario Andretti | Lotus-Ford | 78-3 | 75 | 1:42:52.22 | 1 | 9 |
| 2 | 12 | (Argentina) Carlos Reutemann | Ferrari | 312B-030/T2-5 | 75 | + 15.85 | 4 | 6 |
| 3 | 20 | (South Africa) Jody Scheckter | Wolf-Ford | WR1 | 75 | + 24.51 | 5 | 4 |
| 4 | 2 | (West Germany) Jochen Mass | McLaren-Ford | M23-12 | 75 | + 24.87 | 9 | 3 |
| 5 | 6 | (Sweden) Gunnar Nilsson | Lotus-Ford | 78-2 | 75 | + 1:05.83 | 12 | 2 |
| 6 | 8 | (West Germany) Hans-Joachim Stuck | Brabham-Alfa Romeo | BT45B-1 | 74 | + 1 Lap | 13 | 1 |
| 7 | 26 | (France) Jacques Laffite | Ligier-Matra | JS7-02 | 74 | + 1 Lap | 2 | |
| 8 | 3 | (Sweden) Ronnie Peterson | Tyrrell-Ford | P34-5 | 74 | + 1 Lap | 15 | |
| 9 | 18 | (Austria) Hans Binder | Surtees-Ford | TS19-01 | 73 | + 2 Laps | 20 | |
| 10 | 30 | (United States) Brett Lunger | March-Ford | 761-2 | 72 | + 3 Laps | 25 | |
| 11 | 10 | (South Africa) Ian Scheckter | March-Ford | 761B-1 | 72 | + 3 Laps | 17 | |
| 12 | 27 | (Belgium) Patrick Nève | March-Ford | 761-7 | 71 | + 4 Laps | 22 | |
| 13 | 36 | (Spain) Emilio de Villota | McLaren-Ford | M23-6 | 70 | + 5 Laps | 23 | |
| 14 | 28 | (Brazil) Emerson Fittipaldi | Fittipaldi-Ford | FD004-3 | 70 | + 5 Laps | 19 | |
| Ret | 7 | (United Kingdom) John Watson | Brabham-Alfa Romeo | BT45B-5 | 64 | Fuel System | 6 | |
| Ret | 17 | (Australia) Alan Jones | Shadow-Ford | DN8-3A | 56 | Accident | 14 | |
| Ret | 24 | (United Kingdom) Rupert Keegan | Hesketh-Ford | 308E-1 | 32 | Accident | 16 | |
| Ret | 25 | (Austria) Harald Ertl | Hesketh-Ford | 308E-2 | 29 | Radiator | 18 | |
| Ret | 16 | (Italy) Renzo Zorzi | Shadow-Ford | DN8-1A | 25 | Engine | 24 | |
| Ret | 37 | (Italy) Arturo Merzario | March-Ford | 761B-2 | 16 | Suspension | 21 | |
| Ret | 4 | (France) Patrick Depailler | Tyrrell-Ford | P34-7 | 12 | Engine | 10 | |
| Ret | 1 | (United Kingdom) James Hunt | McLaren-Ford | M26-1 | 10 | Engine | 7 | |
| Ret | 22 | (Switzerland) Clay Regazzoni | Ensign-Ford | N177 MN04-1 | 9 | Accident | 8 | |
| Ret | 19 | (Italy) Vittorio Brambilla | Surtees-Ford | TS19-04 | 9 | Accident | 11 | |
| DNS | 11 | (Austria) Niki Lauda | Ferrari | 312B-030/T2-6 | 0 | Driver Injured | 3 | |
| DNQ | 34 | (France) Jean-Pierre Jarier | Penske-Ford | PC4-02 | | | | |
| DNQ | 9 | (Brazil) Alex Ribeiro | March-Ford | 761B-3 | | | | |
| DNQ | 33 | (Netherlands) Boy Hayje | March-Ford | 761-3 | | | | |
| DNQ | 38 | (United Kingdom) Brian Henton | March-Ford | 761-T | | | | |
| DNQ | 31 | (United Kingdom) David Purley | LEC-Ford | CRP1-1 | | | | |
| DNQ | 35 | (Sweden) Conny Andersson | BRM | P207-1 | | | | |

== Championship standings after the race ==
Drivers' Championship standings

| | Pos | Driver | Points |
|---|---|---|---|
| | 1 | (South Africa) Jody Scheckter | 23 |
| 2 | 2 | (United States) Mario Andretti | 20 |
| 1 | 3 | (Argentina) Carlos Reutemann | 19 |
| 1 | 4 | (Austria) Niki Lauda | 19 |
| | 5 | (United Kingdom) James Hunt | 9 |

Constructors' Championship standings

| | Pos | Constructor | Points |
|---|---|---|---|
| | 1 | (Italy) Ferrari | 34 |
| | 2 | (Canada) Wolf-Ford | 23 |
| 1 | 3 | (United Kingdom) Lotus-Ford | 22 |
| 1 | 4 | (United Kingdom) McLaren-Ford | 12 |
| 1 | 5 | (United Kingdom) Brabham-Alfa Romeo | 8 |

- Note: Only the top five positions are included for both sets of standings.

| Previous race: 1977 United States Grand Prix West | FIA Formula One World Championship; 1977 season | Next race: 1977 Monaco Grand Prix |
| Previous race: 1976 Spanish Grand Prix | Spanish Grand Prix | Next race: 1978 Spanish Grand Prix |
