= Alex Ribeiro =

Brazilian racing driver (born 1948)

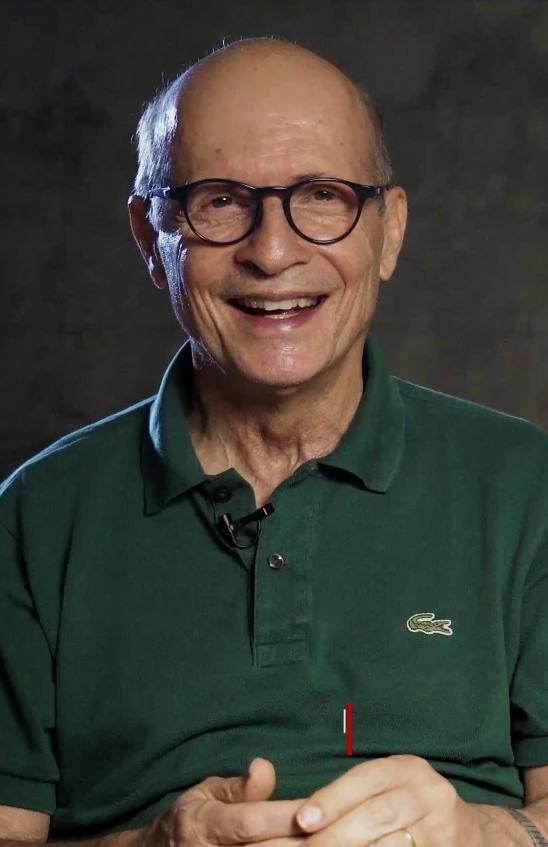
- Ribeiro in 2021
- Born: 7 November 1948 (age 78); Belo Horizonte, Brazil

Formula One World Championship career
- Nationality: (Brazil) Brazilian
- Active years: 1976 - 1977, 1979
- Team(s): Hesketh, March, Fittipaldi
- Entries: 20 (10 starts)
- Career points: 0
- First entry: 1976 United States Grand Prix
- Last entry: 1979 United States Grand Prix

Alex Dias Ribeiro (born November 7, 1948) is a former racing driver from Brazil. He entered in 20 Formula One World Championship Grands Prix but scored no World Championship points.

== Career ==
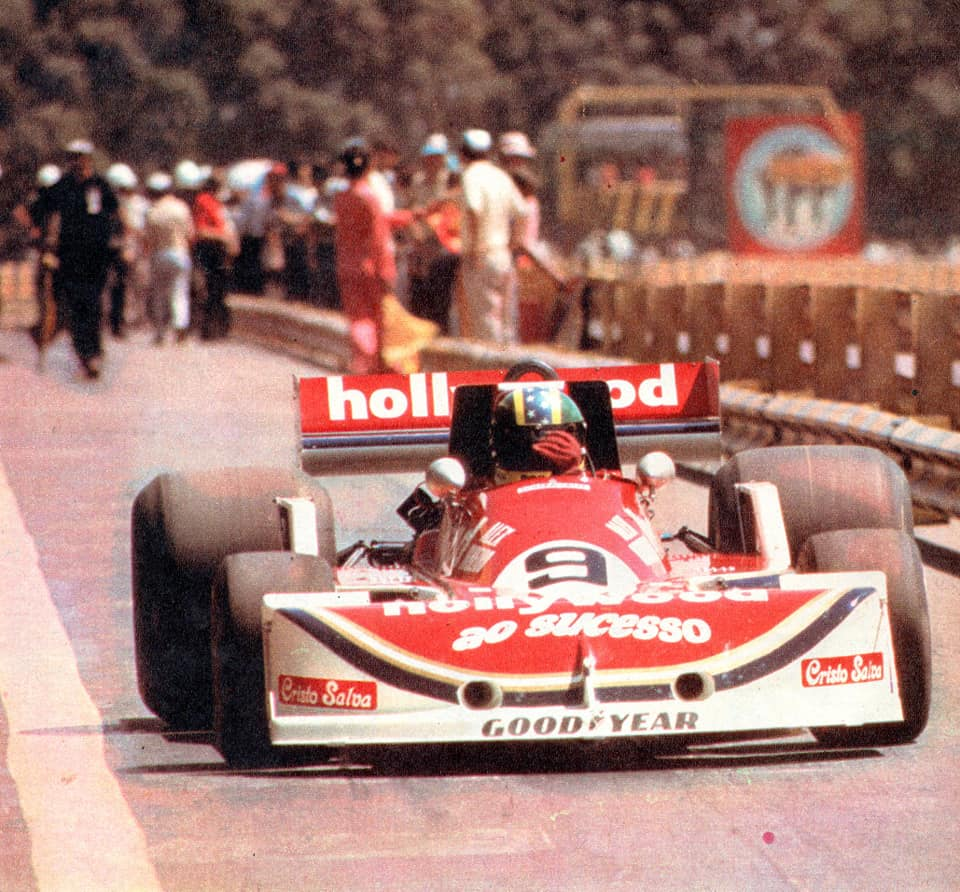
Ribeiro in the 1977 Argentine Grand Prix

After solid graduation from karting (two consecutive Brazilian Championships) and lower formulae (first in the 1973 Brazilian Formula Ford Championship and fifth in the 1976 European Formula Two season), Ribeiro paid for his drive in the March Formula One team for the 1977 season (his main sponsors were Caixa Econômica Federal and Souza Cruz).

However, the season turned into a nightmare. March owner Max Mosley hired four drivers, and the team simply could not provide for them all. Ribeiro's reputation as a driver suffered.

In 1978, Ribeiro tried to save his credentials as a racing driver and set up a privately owned F2 team to enter the 1978 European Formula Two season, a year dominated by the March factory team. His car was painted with the words "Jesus Saves", which he also painted on his helmet and Formula One cars. Ribeiro managed to win the Nürburgring round dramatically after favorites Bruno Giacomelli and Marc Surer retired from the race, being the only Brazilian driver to win on the old and legendary German circuit, which at the time was 22.8 kilometers long. The rest of the season, however, bore no fruit.

Then, in 1979, the fellow Brazilian Fittipaldi team offered Ribeiro two chances to qualify a second car, for the Canadian and American Formula One Grand Prix. However, the team was concentrating on former F1 champion Emerson Fittipaldi, and Ribeiro failed to qualify for both events.

Ribeiro also served as chaplain at Formula One events while working as the driver of the medical car.

In 1994, Ribeiro joined the Brazil national football team as a pastor at the FIFA World Cup in the United States. He held worship services for the team and later wrote a book about the team's journey to victory, titled "Who won the '94 World Cup?" (¿quién Ganó La Copa Mundial?).

At the 2000 Monaco Grand Prix, Ribeiro crashed his Medical car at the Tabac curve before Saturday morning practice, and passenger doctor Sid Watkins broke three ribs. At the 2002 Brazilian Grand Prix, in his farewell as driver of medical car (and his definitive retirement from Formula 1), Ribeiro was involved in a potentially serious incident. During the morning warm-up on race day Sunday, Enrique Bernoldi crashed his Arrows in Turn 2. When Ribeiro, driving the Medical Car, went out to check on Bernoldi, he opened the door to the car. Just as he opened it, Nick Heidfeld came along in his Sauber and smashed into the open door. Both Ribeiro and Heidfeld were uninjured.

In 1981, Ribeiro wrote an autobiographical book called "Mais Que Vencedor" (rough translation "More Than A Winner"), in which he nicknamed March owner Max Mosley "Mack Mouse" and March engineer Robin Herd "Robin Hood". He owned a motorbike shop in Brasilia where both Nelson Piquet and Roberto Moreno worked as young mechanics, therefore having the unusual distinction that the same shop produced three Formula One drivers.

== Racing record ==
=== Complete European Formula Two Championship results ===
(key) (Races in bold indicate pole position; races in italics indicate fastest lap)

Year	Entrant	Chassis	Engine	1	2	3	4	5	6	7	8	9	10	11	12	13	14	Pos.	Pts
1975	March Engineering	March 752	BMW	EST	THR	HOC	NÜR	PAU	HOC	SAL	ROU	MUG	PER	SIL	ZOL	NOG	VLL; Ret	NC	0
1976	March Engineering	March 762	BMW	HOC; 13	THR; 2	VLL; 3	SAL; 5	PAU; 6	HOC; Ret	**ROU**; Ret	MUG; 4	PER; 2	EST; 3	NOG; 5	HOC; Ret			5th	31
1977	March Engineering	March 772P	BMW	SIL	**THR**; 3	HOC	NÜR									DON; 8		14th	4
1977	AFMP Euroracing	March 772						VLL; 14	PAU	MUG								14th	4
1977	Fred Opert Racing	Chevron B40	Hart								ROU; 7	NOG	PER	MIS; DNQ	EST			14th	4
1978	Alex Ribeiro	March 782	Hart	THR; 15	HOC; 6	NÜR; 1	PAU; 12	MUG; 10	VLL; NC	ROU; 10	DON; Ret	NOG; Ret	PER; 7	MIS; 13	HOC			8th	11

=== Complete Formula One World Championship results ===
(key)

Year	Entrant	Chassis	Engine	1	2	3	4	5	6	7	8	9	10	11	12	13	14	15	16	17	WDC	Points
1976	Hesketh Racing	Hesketh 308D	Cosworth V8	BRA	RSA	USW	ESP	BEL	MON	SWE	FRA	GBR	GER	AUT	NED	ITA	CAN	USA; 12	JPN		NC	0
1977	Hollywood March Racing	March 761B	Cosworth V8	ARG; Ret	BRA; Ret	RSA; Ret	USW; Ret	ESP; DNQ	MON; DNQ	BEL; DNQ	SWE; DNQ	FRA; DNQ	GBR; DNQ	GER; 8	AUT; DNQ	NED; 11	ITA; DNQ	USA; 15	CAN; 8	JPN; 12	NC	0
1979	Fittipaldi Automotive	Fittipaldi F6A	Cosworth V8	ARG	BRA	RSA	USW	ESP	BEL	MON	FRA	GBR	GER	AUT	NED	ITA	CAN; DNQ	USA; DNQ			NC	0
