= 1977 Belgian Grand Prix =

Formula One race

- Race 7 of 17 in the 1977 Formula One season

Race details
- Date: 5 June 1977
- Location: Circuit Zolder; Heusden-Zolder, Belgium
- Course length: 4.262 km (2.648 miles)
- Distance: 70 laps, 298.340 km (185.380 miles)
- Weather: Wet

Pole position
Driver	(United States) Mario Andretti	Lotus-Ford
- Time: 1:24.64

Fastest lap
Driver	(Sweden) Gunnar Nilsson	Lotus-Ford
- Time: 1:27.36 on lap 53

Podium
First	(Sweden) Gunnar Nilsson	Lotus-Ford
Second	(Austria) Niki Lauda	Ferrari
Third	(Sweden) Ronnie Peterson	Tyrrell-Ford

The 1977 Belgian Grand Prix was a Formula One motor race held at Zolder on 5 June 1977. It was the seventh race of the 1977 World Championship of F1 Drivers and the 1977 International Cup for F1 Constructors.

The 70-lap race was won by Swedish driver Gunnar Nilsson, driving a Lotus-Ford. Austrian driver Niki Lauda finished second in a Ferrari, while Nilsson's fellow Swede, Ronnie Peterson, finished third in the six-wheeled Tyrrell-Ford. This was to be Nilsson's only Formula One victory, before his career was cut short by cancer and he died in October 1978.

== Qualifying ==
=== Qualifying classification ===
Pos.	Driver	Constructor	Time	No
1	(United States) Mario Andretti	Lotus-Ford	1:24.64	1
2	(United Kingdom) John Watson	Brabham-Alfa Romeo	1:26.18	2
3	(Sweden) Gunnar Nilsson	Lotus-Ford	1:26.45	3
4	(South Africa) Jody Scheckter	Wolf-Ford	1:26.48	4
5	(France) Patrick Depailler	Tyrrell-Ford	1:26.71	5
6	(West Germany) Jochen Mass	McLaren-Ford	1:26.81	6
7	(Argentina) Carlos Reutemann	Ferrari	1:26.85	7
8	(Sweden) Ronnie Peterson	Tyrrell-Ford	1:26.95	8
9	(United Kingdom) James Hunt	McLaren-Ford	1:27.04	9
10	(France) Jacques Laffite	Ligier-Matra	1:27.05	10
11	(Austria) Niki Lauda	Ferrari	1:27.11	11
12	(Italy) Vittorio Brambilla	Surtees-Ford	1:27.23	12
13	(Switzerland) Clay Regazzoni	Ensign-Ford	1:27.28	13
14	(Italy) Arturo Merzario	March-Ford	1:27.33	14
15	(Italy) Riccardo Patrese	Shadow-Ford	1:27.35	15
16	(Brazil) Emerson Fittipaldi	Fittipaldi-Ford	1:27.47	16
17	(Australia) Alan Jones	Shadow-Ford	1:27.55	17
18	(West Germany) Hans-Joachim Stuck	Brabham-Alfa Romeo	1:27.75	18
19	(United Kingdom) Rupert Keegan	Hesketh-Ford	1:28.02	19
20	(United Kingdom) David Purley	LEC-Ford	1:28.10	20
21	(South Africa) Ian Scheckter	March-Ford	1:28.50	21
22	(United States) Brett Lunger	McLaren-Ford	1:28.51	22
23	(Australia) Larry Perkins	Surtees-Ford	1:28.53	23
24	(Belgium) Patrick Nève	March-Ford	1:28.67	24
25	(Austria) Harald Ertl	Hesketh-Ford	1:29.02	25
26	(France) Jean-Pierre Jarier	Penske-Ford	1:29.11	26
Cut-off
27	(Netherlands) Boy Hayje	March-Ford	1:29.46	27
28	(Spain) Emilio de Villota	McLaren-Ford	1:30.12	—
29	(Sweden) Conny Andersson	BRM	1:30.24	—
30	(Brazil) Alex Ribeiro	March-Ford	1:30.24	—
31	(Belgium) Bernard de Dryver	March-Ford	1:30.42	—
32	(Mexico) Héctor Rebaque	Hesketh-Ford	1:33.30	—

== Race ==
=== Report ===
In qualifying Mario Andretti took a comfortable pole position with John Watson just beating the second Lotus of Gunnar Nilsson to second. The race was wet due to rain earlier in the day. Watson took the lead into the first corner, but later in the lap, Andretti locked up into the chicane and ran into the back of the Brabham, knocking both drivers out of the race with Jody Scheckter taking over the lead.

Scheckter led the early stages ahead of Nilsson, whereas Carlos Reutemann made an early charge but spun off. The track began to dry and everyone had to pit for tyres, and those who stopped early were the ones who benefited, as now Niki Lauda was leading from Jochen Mass and Scheckter was down to fifth. Mass spun off from second, handing it to Nilsson who then went on to catch and pass Lauda before driving away to his first career victory. Behind second-placed Lauda, Ronnie Peterson completed the podium for Team Tyrrell after Scheckter retired with an engine failure. This remains the only F1 race in which two Swedes shared the podium.

David Purley stayed out later than most drivers and was running third by lap 21. After he finally pitted, he emerged in front of race leader Lauda. He was likely unaware that Lauda was a lap ahead and did not let him through, holding the leader up for a few laps. This may have cost Lauda victory and the two were involved in an argument after the race.

=== Classification ===
Pos	No	Driver	Constructor	Laps	Time/Retired	Grid	Points
1	6	(Sweden) Gunnar Nilsson	Lotus-Ford	70	1:55:05.71	3	9
2	11	(Austria) Niki Lauda	Ferrari	70	+14.19	11	6
3	3	(Sweden) Ronnie Peterson	Tyrrell-Ford	70	+19.95	8	4
4	19	(Italy) Vittorio Brambilla	Surtees-Ford	70	+24.98	12	3
5	17	(Australia) Alan Jones	Shadow-Ford	70	+1:15.47	17	2
6	8	(West Germany) Hans-Joachim Stuck	Brabham-Alfa Romeo	69	+1 lap	18	1
7	1	(United Kingdom) James Hunt	McLaren-Ford	69	+1 lap	9	
8	4	(France) Patrick Depailler	Tyrrell-Ford	69	+1 lap	5	
9	25	(Austria) Harald Ertl	Hesketh-Ford	69	+1 lap	25	
10	27	(Belgium) Patrick Nève	March-Ford	68	+2 laps	24	
11	34	(France) Jean-Pierre Jarier	Penske-Ford	68	+2 laps	26	
12	18	(Australia) Larry Perkins	Surtees-Ford	67	+3 laps	23	
13	31	(United Kingdom) David Purley	LEC-Ford	67	+3 laps	20	
14	37	(Italy) Arturo Merzario	March-Ford	65	+5 laps	14	
NC	33	(Netherlands) Boy Hayje	March-Ford	63	+7 laps	27	
Ret	20	(South Africa) Jody Scheckter	Wolf-Ford	62	Engine	4	
Ret	2	(West Germany) Jochen Mass	McLaren-Ford	39	Accident	6	
Ret	26	(France) Jacques Laffite	Ligier-Matra	32	Engine	10	
Ret	22	(Switzerland) Clay Regazzoni	Ensign-Ford	29	Engine	13	
Ret	12	(Argentina) Carlos Reutemann	Ferrari	14	Accident	7	
Ret	24	(United Kingdom) Rupert Keegan	Hesketh-Ford	14	Accident	19	
Ret	16	(Italy) Riccardo Patrese	Shadow-Ford	12	Accident	15	
Ret	10	(South Africa) Ian Scheckter	March-Ford	8	Accident	21	
Ret	28	(Brazil) Emerson Fittipaldi	Fittipaldi-Ford	2	Electrical	16	
Ret	5	(United States) Mario Andretti	Lotus-Ford	0	Collision	1	
Ret	7	(United Kingdom) John Watson	Brabham-Alfa Romeo	0	Collision	2	
DNS	30	(United States) Brett Lunger	McLaren-Ford		Engine	22	
DNQ	36	(Spain) Emilio de Villota	McLaren-Ford				
DNQ	9	(Brazil) Alex Ribeiro	March-Ford				
DNQ	35	(Sweden) Conny Andersson	BRM				
DNQ	38	(Belgium) Bernard de Dryver	March-Ford				
DNQ	39	(Mexico) Héctor Rebaque	Hesketh-Ford				

== Notes ==
- This was the Formula One World Championship debut for Mexican driver Héctor Rebaque and Belgian driver Bernard de Dryver.
- This was the 25th pole position set by an American driver.
- This was the 10th Grand Prix win for a Swedish driver.

== Championship standings after the race ==
Drivers' Championship standings

	Pos	Driver	Points
	1	(South Africa) Jody Scheckter	32
	2	(Austria) Niki Lauda	31
	3	(Argentina) Carlos Reutemann	23
	4	(United States) Mario Andretti	22
5	5	(Sweden) Gunnar Nilsson	13

Constructors' Championship standings

	Pos	Constructor	Points
	1	(Italy) Ferrari	46
1	2	(United Kingdom) Lotus-Ford	33
1	3	(Canada) Wolf-Ford	32
	4	(United Kingdom) McLaren-Ford	15
2	5	(United Kingdom) Tyrrell-Ford	11

- Note: Only the top five positions are included for both sets of standings.

Previous race: 1977 Monaco Grand Prix	FIA Formula One World Championship; 1977 season	Next race: 1977 Swedish Grand Prix
Previous race: 1976 Belgian Grand Prix	Belgian Grand Prix	Next race: 1978 Belgian Grand Prix
