= BRM Hepworth GB-1 =

British sports prototype racing cars

- Category: Can-Am
- Constructor: BRM
- Production: 1980 (1 built; never raced)

Technical specifications
- Chassis: Fibreglass body with aluminium monocoque
- Suspension (front): Double wishbone, coil springs over friction dampers, anti-roll bar
- Suspension (rear): Reversed lower wishbones, top link, radius arms, coil springs over friction dampers, Anti-roll bar
- Wheelbase: 93 in (236.2 cm)
- Engine: Chevrolet 90° 5,000 cc (305 cu in) V8 engine naturally aspirated mid-engined
- Transmission: Hewland L.G.500 4-speed manual
- Power: 500 hp (370 kW) @ 5,000 rpm 485 lb⋅ft (658 N⋅m)
- Weight: 1,709 lb (775.2 kg)

Competition history
- Notable entrants: Team BRM

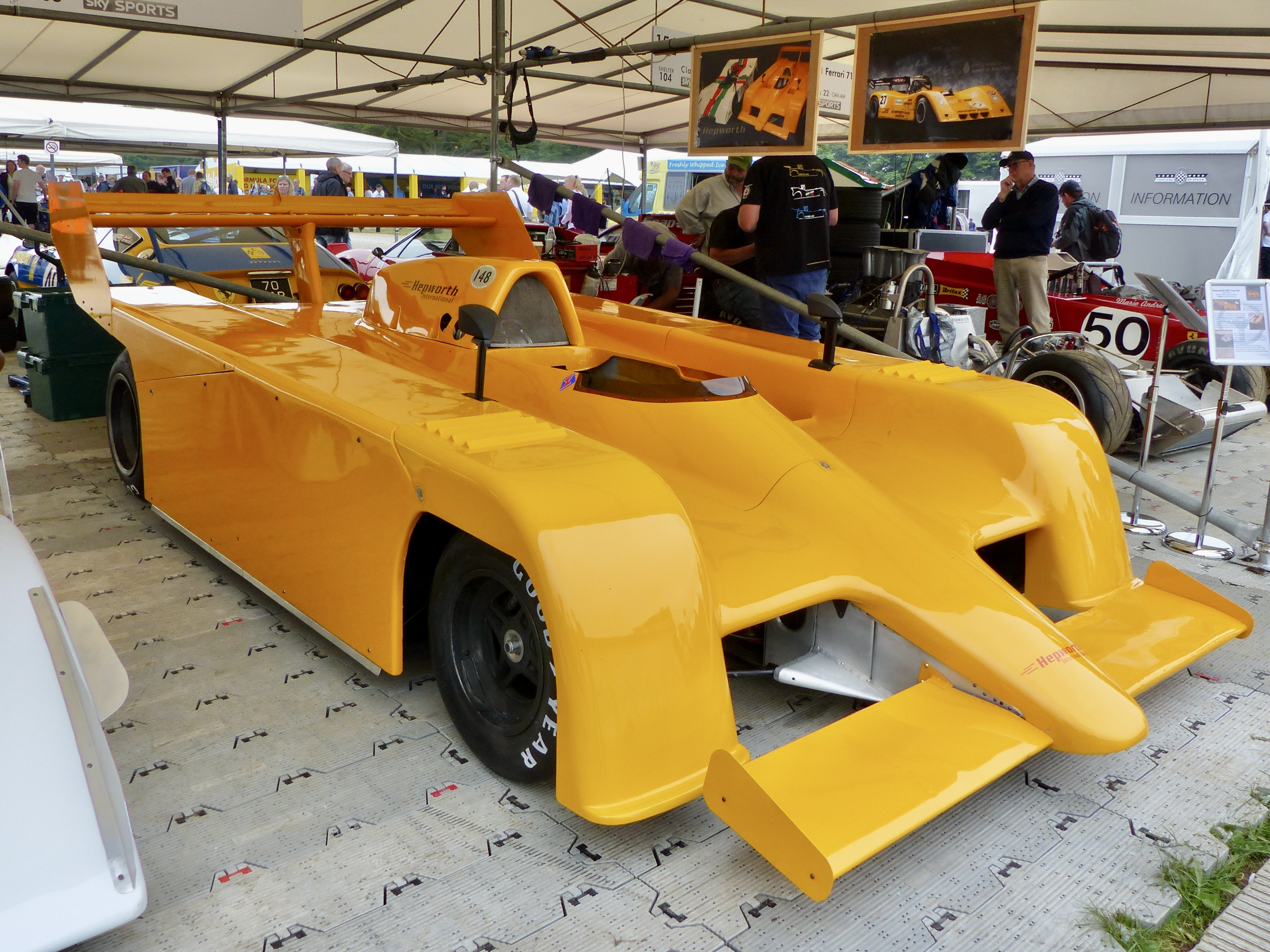
Hepworth GB1, Goodwood Festival of Speed 2016

The BRM Hepworth GB-1 was a British sports prototype race car.

== History ==
The car was designed, developed, and built by British Hillclimber David Hepworth and his Hepworth Racing Organization with the assistance of many other firms including Bob Sparshotts BS Fabrications using British constructor BRM final ever F1 car the BRM P230, for the North American Can-Am sports car racing series. It was crashed during practice testing at Riverside in 1980, and never raced. It was itself based on the unraced BRM P230 Formula One car.
