= 1977 French Grand Prix =

- Race 9 of 17 in the 1977 Formula One season

Race details
- Date: 3 July 1977
- Location: Dijon-Prenois, Dijon, France
- Course length: 3.801 km (2.361 miles)
- Distance: 80 laps, 304.08 km (188.88 miles)
- Weather: Dry

Pole position
Driver	(United States) Mario Andretti	Lotus-Ford
- Time: 1:12.21

Fastest lap
Driver	(United States) Mario Andretti	Lotus-Ford
- Time: 1:13.75 on lap 76

Podium
First	(United States) Mario Andretti	Lotus-Ford
Second	(United Kingdom) John Watson	Brabham-Alfa Romeo
Third	(United Kingdom) James Hunt	McLaren-Ford

The 1977 French Grand Prix was a Formula One motor race held at Dijon-Prenois near Dijon, France on 3 July 1977. It was race 9 of 17 in both the 1977 World Championship of F1 Drivers and the 1977 International Cup for F1 Constructors.

The 80-lap race was won by American driver Mario Andretti, driving a Lotus-Ford, after he started from pole position. Northern Irishman John Watson led for most of the race in his Brabham-Alfa Romeo, before Andretti passed him on the final lap. Watson finished 1.55 seconds behind the American, with Englishman James Hunt third in his McLaren-Ford.

Austrian Niki Lauda finished fifth in his Ferrari to take the lead of the Drivers' Championship from South African Jody Scheckter, who failed to finish in his Wolf-Ford.

== Report ==
Once again it was Mario Andretti on pole with James Hunt second and Gunnar Nilsson third on the grid. Hunt got the best start and led into the first corner from John Watson and Jacques Laffite, with Andretti dropping down to fourth. However, Watson passed Hunt on the fifth lap and started to build a gap until Andretti got up to second and began to reel him in. During the final few laps, leader Watson and Andretti were running nose-to-tail but Watson held him off till the last lap when his 12 cylinder Alfa engine ran out of fuel and immediately Andretti was past. Andretti thus took the win ahead of a crestfallen Watson and Hunt.

Lauda was nearly lapped, but picked up Watson for a ride to the podium ceremony, and the lead in the standings, too.

== Classification ==
=== Qualifying classification ===
Pos.	No	Driver	Constructor	Time	Gap
1	5	(United States) Mario Andretti	Lotus-Ford	1:12.21	
2	1	(United Kingdom) James Hunt	McLaren-Ford	1:12.73	+0.52
3	6	(Sweden) Gunnar Nilsson	Lotus-Ford	1:12.79	+0.58
4	7	(United Kingdom) John Watson	Brabham-Alfa Romeo	1:12.83	+0.62
5	26	(France) Jacques Laffite	Ligier-Matra	1:13.30	+1.09
6	12	(Argentina) Carlos Reutemann	Ferrari	1:13.36	+1.15
7	2	(West Germany) Jochen Mass	McLaren-Ford	1:13.41	+1.20
8	20	(South Africa) Jody Scheckter	Wolf-Ford	1:13.45	+1.24
9	11	(Austria) Niki Lauda	Ferrari	1:13.52	+1.31
10	17	(Australia) Alan Jones	Shadow-Ford	1:13.56	+1.35
11	19	(Italy) Vittorio Brambilla	Surtees-Ford	1:13.61	+1.40
12	4	(France) Patrick Depailler	Tyrrell-Ford	1:13.66	+1.45
13	8	(West Germany) Hans-Joachim Stuck	Brabham-Alfa Romeo	1:13.67	+1.46
14	24	(United Kingdom) Rupert Keegan	Hesketh-Ford	1:13.71	+1.50
15	16	(Italy) Riccardo Patrese	Shadow-Ford	1:13.87	+1.66
16	22	(Switzerland) Clay Regazzoni	Ensign-Ford	1:13.90	+1.69
17	3	(Sweden) Ronnie Peterson	Tyrrell-Ford	1:13.92	+1.71
18	37	(Italy) Arturo Merzario	March-Ford	1:13.92	+1.71
19	34	(France) Jean-Pierre Jarier	Penske-Ford	1:14.17	+1.96
20	10	(South Africa) Ian Scheckter	March-Ford	1:14.24	+2.03
21	31	(United Kingdom) David Purley	LEC-Ford	1:14.39	+2.18
22	28	(Brazil) Emerson Fittipaldi	Fittipaldi-Ford	1:14.45	+2.24
Cut-off
23	9	(Brazil) Alex Ribeiro	March-Ford	1:14.60	+2.39
24	27	(Belgium) Patrick Nève	March-Ford	1:14.74	+2.53
25	30	(United States) Brett Lunger	McLaren-Ford	1:14.83	+2.62
26	25	(Austria) Harald Ertl	Hesketh-Ford	1:15.06	+2.85
27	18	(Australia) Larry Perkins	Surtees-Ford	1:15.13	+2.92
28	39	(Mexico) Héctor Rebaque	Hesketh-Ford	1:15.88	+3.67
29	18	(France) Patrick Tambay	Surtees-Ford	1:16.06	+3.85
30	35	(Sweden) Conny Andersson	BRM	1:16.17	+3.96

=== Race classification ===
Pos	No	Driver	Constructor	Laps	Time/Retired	Grid	Points
1	5	(United States) Mario Andretti	Lotus-Ford	80	1:39:40.13	1	9
2	7	(United Kingdom) John Watson	Brabham-Alfa Romeo	80	+ 1.55	4	6
3	1	(United Kingdom) James Hunt	McLaren-Ford	80	+ 33.87	2	4
4	6	(Sweden) Gunnar Nilsson	Lotus-Ford	80	+ 1:11.08	3	3
5	11	(Austria) Niki Lauda	Ferrari	80	+ 1:14.15	9	2
6	12	(Argentina) Carlos Reutemann	Ferrari	79	+ 1 Lap	6	1
7	22	(Switzerland) Clay Regazzoni	Ensign-Ford	79	+ 1 Lap	16	
8	26	(France) Jacques Laffite	Ligier-Matra	78	+ 2 Laps	5	
9	2	(West Germany) Jochen Mass	McLaren-Ford	78	+ 2 Laps	7	
10	24	(United Kingdom) Rupert Keegan	Hesketh-Ford	78	+ 2 Laps	14	
11	28	(Brazil) Emerson Fittipaldi	Fittipaldi-Ford	77	+ 3 Laps	22	
12	3	(Sweden) Ronnie Peterson	Tyrrell-Ford	77	+ 3 Laps	17	
13	19	(Italy) Vittorio Brambilla	Surtees-Ford	77	+ 3 Laps	11	
NC	10	(South Africa) Ian Scheckter	March-Ford	69	+ 11 Laps	20	
Ret	20	(South Africa) Jody Scheckter	Wolf-Ford	66	Accident	8	
Ret	8	(West Germany) Hans-Joachim Stuck	Brabham-Alfa Romeo	64	Accident	13	
Ret	17	(Australia) Alan Jones	Shadow-Ford	60	Transmission	10	
Ret	37	(Italy) Arturo Merzario	March-Ford	27	Gearbox	18	
Ret	4	(France) Patrick Depailler	Tyrrell-Ford	21	Accident	12	
Ret	16	(Italy) Riccardo Patrese	Shadow-Ford	6	Engine	15	
Ret	31	(United Kingdom) David Purley	LEC-Ford	5	Accident	21	
Ret	34	(France) Jean-Pierre Jarier	Penske-Ford	4	Accident	19	
DNQ	9	(Brazil) Alex Ribeiro	March-Ford				
DNQ	27	(Belgium) Patrick Nève	March-Ford				
DNQ	30	(United States) Brett Lunger	McLaren-Ford				
DNQ	25	(Austria) Harald Ertl	Hesketh-Ford				
DNQ	18	(Australia) Larry Perkins	Surtees-Ford				
DNQ	39	(Mexico) Héctor Rebaque	Hesketh-Ford				
DNQ	18	(France) Patrick Tambay	Surtees-Ford				
DNQ	35	(Sweden) Conny Andersson	BRM				

== Notes ==
- This was the Formula One World Championship debut for French driver and future Grand Prix winner Patrick Tambay.
- This race marked the 200th Grand Prix start for a Swedish driver. In those 200 races, Swedish drivers had won 10 Grands Prix, achieved 24 podium finishes, 12 pole positions, and 6 fastest laps.
- This was the 25th Grand Prix start for Ligier.

== Championship standings after the race ==
Drivers' Championship standings

	Pos	Driver	Points
1	1	(Austria) Niki Lauda	33
2	2	(United States) Mario Andretti	32
2	3	(South Africa) Jody Scheckter	32
1	4	(Argentina) Carlos Reutemann	28
1	5	(Sweden) Gunnar Nilsson	16

Constructors' Championship standings

	Pos	Constructor	Points
	1	(Italy) Ferrari	50 (52)
	2	(United Kingdom) Lotus-Ford	43
	3	(Canada) Wolf-Ford	32
	4	(United Kingdom) McLaren-Ford	25
1	5	(United Kingdom) Brabham-Alfa Romeo	17

- Note: Only the top five positions are included for both sets of standings. Only the best 8 results from the first 9 races and the best 7 results from the remaining 8 races were retained. Numbers without parentheses are retained points; numbers in parentheses are total points scored.

Previous race: 1977 Swedish Grand Prix	FIA Formula One World Championship; 1977 season	Next race: 1977 British Grand Prix
Previous race: 1976 French Grand Prix	French Grand Prix	Next race: 1978 French Grand Prix
