= Chevron B30 =

The Chevron B30 is an open-wheel race car, designed, developed and built by British manufacturer and constructor, Chevron, for Formula 5000 racing, in 1975, where it found modest success. It was driven by Briton David Purley. Purley won 2 races in the 1975 Championship season, eventually finishing the championship in 5th-place, with 98 points. It was powered by a Cosworth-tuned naturally-aspirated 3.4 L (210 cu in) Ford V6 engine, and was the only car on the grid to be fielding a V6 engine (which was still permitted within the regulations). It was also entered into one non-championship Formula One race, the Race of Champions at Brands Hatch, but failed to qualify. It was later converted into a Group 8 car, where it competed in the short-lived Shellsport International Formula Libre racing series. David Purley successfully won the 1976 Championship season, winning 6 out of the 13 races that season, taking 7 podium finishes, as well as 4 pole positions, and 7 fastest laps, and finishing the season with 188 championship points.
