= 1977 Swedish Grand Prix =

- Race 8 of 17 in the 1977 Formula One season
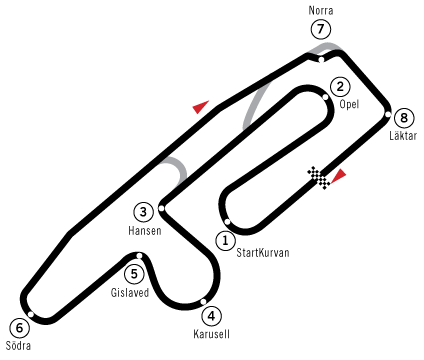

Race details
- Date: 19 June 1977
- Location: Scandinavian Raceway, Anderstorp
- Course: Permanent racing facility
- Course length: 4.018 km (2.497 miles)
- Distance: 72 laps, 289.296 km (179.760 miles)
- Weather: Dry

Pole position
Driver	(United States) Mario Andretti	Lotus-Ford
- Time: 1:25.404

Fastest lap
Driver	(United States) Mario Andretti	Lotus-Ford
- Time: 1:27.607

Podium
First	(France) Jacques Laffite	Ligier-Matra
Second	(West Germany) Jochen Mass	McLaren-Ford
Third	(Argentina) Carlos Reutemann	Ferrari

The 1977 Swedish Grand Prix was a Formula One motor race held at the Scandinavian Raceway on 19 June 1977. It was the eighth race of the 1977 Formula One season.

The 72-lap race was won by Frenchman Jacques Laffite, driving a Ligier-Matra. This is generally considered to have been the first all-French victory in the Formula One World Championship as well as the first Formula One victory for a French-licensed team and a French engine.

German driver Jochen Mass finished second in a McLaren-Ford, with Argentinian Carlos Reutemann third in a Ferrari.

== Report ==
The Swedish race was full of anticipation after Gunnar Nilsson's win last time out, but once again in qualifying, it was his teammate Mario Andretti leading the way from John Watson, with James Hunt heading the second row.

At the start of the race, Watson led into the first corner, followed by Jody Scheckter. Soon, however, Andretti passed both of them and opened up a lead. Watson and Scheckter battled for second until they collided, forcing Scheckter to retire and Watson to have to pit for repairs. James Hunt, who was now in second, began to drop back; he was passed by a charging Jacques Laffite and his teammate, Jochen Mass.

Andretti, however, was dominant until he had to pit due to a fuel metering problem with two laps left. In doing so, he handed the lead to Laffite, who went on to take his first ever Formula One victory ahead of Mass and Carlos Reutemann.

Laffite's victory in his Gitanes-sponsored Ligier-Matra marked the first all-French victory in World Championship history.

== Classification ==
=== Qualifying ===
Pos	No	Driver	Constructor	Time	Gap
1	5	(United States) Mario Andretti	Lotus-Ford	1:25.404	—
2	7	(United Kingdom) John Watson	Brabham-Alfa Romeo	1:25.545	+0.141
3	1	(United Kingdom) James Hunt	McLaren-Ford	1:25.626	+0.222
4	20	(South Africa) Jody Scheckter	Wolf-Ford	1:25.681	+0.277
5	8	(West Germany) Hans-Joachim Stuck	Brabham-Alfa Romeo	1:26.127	+0.723
6	4	(France) Patrick Depailler	Tyrrell-Ford	1:26.209	+0.805
7	6	(Sweden) Gunnar Nilsson	Lotus-Ford	1:26.227	+0.823
8	26	(France) Jacques Laffite	Ligier-Matra	1:26.259	+0.855
9	2	(West Germany) Jochen Mass	McLaren-Ford	1:26.380	+0.976
10	3	(Sweden) Ronnie Peterson	Tyrrell-Ford	1:26.383	+0.979
11	17	(Australia) Alan Jones	Shadow-Ford	1:26.529	+1.125
12	12	(Argentina) Carlos Reutemann	Ferrari	1:26.542	+1.138
13	19	(Italy) Vittorio Brambilla	Surtees-Ford	1:26.573	+1.169
14	22	(Switzerland) Clay Regazzoni	Ensign-Ford	1:26.616	+1.212
15	11	(Austria) Niki Lauda	Ferrari	1:26.826	+1.422
16	16	(United Kingdom) Jackie Oliver	Shadow-Ford	1:27.492	+2.088
17	34	(France) Jean-Pierre Jarier	Penske-Ford	1:27.537	+2.133
18	28	(Brazil) Emerson Fittipaldi	Fittipaldi-Ford	1:27.620	+2.216
19	31	(United Kingdom) David Purley	LEC-Ford	1:27.716	+2.312
20	27	(Belgium) Patrick Nève	March-Ford	1:27.758	+2.354
21	10	(South Africa) Ian Scheckter	March-Ford	1:27.806	+2.402
22	30	(United States) Brett Lunger	McLaren-Ford	1:28.205	+2.801
23	25	(Austria) Harald Ertl	Hesketh-Ford	1:28.377	+2.973
24	24	(United Kingdom) Rupert Keegan	Hesketh-Ford	1:28.404	+3.000
Cut-off
25	9	(Brazil) Alex Ribeiro	March-Ford	1:28.463	+3.059
26	36	(Spain) Emilio de Villota	McLaren-Ford	1:28.708	+3.304
27	18	(Australia) Larry Perkins	Surtees-Ford	1:28.766	+3.362
28	33	(Netherlands) Boy Hayje	March-Ford	1:29.086	+3.682
29	39	(Mexico) Héctor Rebaque	Hesketh-Ford	1:29.889	+4.485
30	35	(Sweden) Conny Andersson	BRM	1:30.286	+4.882
31	32	(Finland) Mikko Kozarowitzky	March-Ford	1:31.079	+5.675

=== Race ===
Pos	No	Driver	Constructor	Laps	Time/Retired	Grid	Points
1	26	(France) Jacques Laffite	Ligier-Matra	72	1:46:55.520	8	9
2	2	(West Germany) Jochen Mass	McLaren-Ford	72	+ 8.449	9	6
3	12	(Argentina) Carlos Reutemann	Ferrari	72	+ 14.369 (Note: Formula1.com in early 2022 listed it as 14.367, but the archived version says 14.369 which is also confirmed by a contemporary report in the Motorsport magazine.)	12	4
4	4	(France) Patrick Depailler	Tyrrell-Ford	72	+ 16.308	6	3
5	7	(United Kingdom) John Watson	Brabham-Alfa Romeo	72	+ 18.735	2	2
6	5	(United States) Mario Andretti	Lotus-Ford	72	+ 25.277	1	1
7	22	(Switzerland) Clay Regazzoni	Ensign-Ford	72	+ 31.266	14	
8	34	(France) Jean-Pierre Jarier	Penske-Ford	72	+ 1:04.567	17	
9	16	(United Kingdom) Jackie Oliver	Shadow-Ford	72	+ 1:22.479	16	
10	8	(West Germany) Hans-Joachim Stuck	Brabham-Alfa Romeo	71	+ 1 lap	5	
11	30	(United States) Brett Lunger	McLaren-Ford	71	+ 1 lap	22	
12	1	(United Kingdom) James Hunt	McLaren-Ford	71	+ 1 lap	3	
13	24	(United Kingdom) Rupert Keegan	Hesketh-Ford	71	+ 1 lap	24	
14	31	(United Kingdom) David Purley	LEC-Ford	70	+ 2 laps	19	
15	27	(Belgium) Patrick Nève	March-Ford	69	+ 3 laps	20	
16	25	(Austria) Harald Ertl	Hesketh-Ford	68	+ 4 laps	23	
17	17	(Australia) Alan Jones	Shadow-Ford	67	+ 5 laps	11	
18	28	(Brazil) Emerson Fittipaldi	Fittipaldi-Ford	66	+ 6 laps	18	
19	6	(Sweden) Gunnar Nilsson	Lotus-Ford	64	Wheel bearing	7	
Ret	10	(South Africa) Ian Scheckter	March-Ford	61	Transmission	21	
Ret	19	(Italy) Vittorio Brambilla	Surtees-Ford	52	Fuel pressure	13	
Ret	11	(Austria) Niki Lauda	Ferrari	47	Handling	15	
Ret	20	(South Africa) Jody Scheckter	Wolf-Ford	29	Accident	4	
Ret	3	(Sweden) Ronnie Peterson	Tyrrell-Ford	7	Ignition	10	
DNQ	9	(Brazil) Alex Ribeiro	March-Ford				
DNQ	36	(Spain) Emilio de Villota	McLaren-Ford				
DNQ	18	(Australia) Larry Perkins	Surtees-Ford				
DNQ	33	(Netherlands) Boy Hayje	March-Ford				
DNQ	39	(Mexico) Héctor Rebaque	Hesketh-Ford				
DNQ	35	(Sweden) Conny Andersson	BRM				
DNQ	32	(Finland) Mikko Kozarowitzky	March-Ford				

== Notes ==
- This was the Formula One World Championship debut for Finnish driver Mikko Kozarowitzky.
- This was the 5th Grand Prix win for a French driver, the 1st Grand Prix win for Ligier, the 1st Grand Prix for a Matra-powered car and for a French engine supplier. Additionally, it was the 10th podium finish for a Matra-powered car.

== Championship standings after the race ==
Drivers' Championship standings

	Pos	Driver	Points
	1	(South Africa) Jody Scheckter	32
	2	(Austria) Niki Lauda	31
	3	(Argentina) Carlos Reutemann	27
	4	(United States) Mario Andretti	23
2	5	(West Germany) Jochen Mass	14

Constructors' Championship standings

Pos	Constructor	Points
1	(Italy) Ferrari	50
2	(United Kingdom) Lotus-Ford	34
3	(Canada) Wolf-Ford	32
4	(United Kingdom) McLaren-Ford	21
5	(United Kingdom) Tyrrell-Ford	14

- Note: Only the top five positions are included for both sets of standings.

== Notes ==
Previous race: 1977 Belgian Grand Prix	FIA Formula One World Championship; 1977 season	Next race: 1977 French Grand Prix
Previous race: 1976 Swedish Grand Prix	Swedish Grand Prix	Next race: 1978 Swedish Grand Prix
