= 1977 Japanese Grand Prix =

- Race 17 of 17 in the 1977 Formula One season

Race details
- Date: 23 October 1977
- Official name: XII Japanese Grand Prix
- Location: Fuji Speedway; Oyama, Shizuoka, Japan
- Course: Permanent racing facility
- Course length: 4.359 km (2.709 miles)
- Distance: 73 laps, 318.207 km (197.725 miles)
- Weather: Dry

Pole position
Driver	(United States) Mario Andretti	Lotus-Ford
- Time: 1:12.23

Fastest lap
Driver	(South Africa) Jody Scheckter	Wolf-Ford
- Time: 1:14.30 on lap 71

Podium
First	(United Kingdom) James Hunt	McLaren-Ford
Second	(Argentina) Carlos Reutemann	Ferrari
Third	(France) Patrick Depailler	Tyrrell-Ford

The 1977 Japanese Grand Prix was a Formula One motor race held on 23 October 1977 at Fuji. It was the 17th and final race of the 1977 Formula One World Championship. At the time, this was to be the last Japanese Grand Prix; this was due to issues with finance and travel (in those days, getting to Japan from Europe required going via Anchorage, Alaska, in the United States or via Hong Kong, for both the Soviet Union and China banned Western aircraft from flying in their airspace), and safety concerns with the Mount Fuji circuit. It was also the last Japanese Grand Prix to be held at Fuji Speedway until 2007. The race would return in 1987, held at the better-spectated and safer Suzuka Circuit.

== Report ==
Mario Andretti and James Hunt continued their late-season battle, with the American pipping Hunt to the pole; John Watson headed the second row. Hunt took the lead at the start, and Jody Scheckter and Jochen Mass jumped up to second and third, whereas Andretti had a terrible start and was at the tail of the top ten. On the second lap Andretti was involved in a collision while trying to gain places, putting him out along with Hans Binder and Noritake Takahara. With Andretti out, Hunt had no challengers left and he built a large gap, with teammate Mass second and Watson passing Scheckter for third. However, both Mass and Watson had to retire within one lap of each other with engine and gearbox failures, and with Scheckter dropping back, Carlos Reutemann was second until he was passed by Jacques Laffite. Hunt went on and capped off the season with a comfortable win, whereas Laffite ran out of fuel on the last lap, handing over second to Reutemann and allowing Patrick Depailler to complete the podium.

A marshal and photographer were killed by debris following a collision involving Gilles Villeneuve's Ferrari and Ronnie Peterson's Tyrrell P34 on lap six. They had both been standing in a prohibited area of the track when the accident occurred. The marshal was trying to clear spectators away from the area.

After the race concluded, both Hunt and Reutemann left the circuit immediately to catch a flight home, leaving only Depailler and his engineer on the podium. The rules changed for the following year; thereafter, the podium celebration became mandatory for the first three drivers in the races (from the 1978 Argentine Grand Prix onwards).

March's driver Ian Scheckter was denied entry into and expelled from Japan, due to only having a tourist visa passport (unlike his brother Jody, who had a working visa) and Japanese objections to the South African apartheid regime.

== Classification ==
=== Qualifying ===
Pos.	Driver	Constructor	Time
1	(United States) Mario Andretti	Lotus–Ford	1:12.23
2	(United Kingdom) James Hunt	McLaren–Ford	+0.16
3	(United Kingdom) John Watson	Brabham–Alfa Romeo	+0.26
4	(West Germany) Hans-Joachim Stuck	Brabham–Alfa Romeo	+0.78
5	(France) Jacques Laffite	Ligier–Matra	+0.85
6	(South Africa) Jody Scheckter	Wolf–Ford	+0.92
7	(Argentina) Carlos Reutemann	Ferrari	+1.09
8	(West Germany) Jochen Mass	McLaren–Ford	+1.14
9	(Italy) Vittorio Brambilla	Surtees–Ford	+1.14
10	(Switzerland) Clay Regazzoni	Ensign–Ford	+1.29
11	(Japan) Kazuyoshi Hoshino	Kojima–Ford	+1.32
12	(Australia) Alan Jones	Shadow–Ford	+1.33
13	(Italy) Riccardo Patrese	Shadow–Ford	+1.35
14	(Sweden) Gunnar Nilsson	Lotus–Ford	+1.43
15	(France) Patrick Depailler	Tyrrell–Ford	+1.93
16	(France) Patrick Tambay	Ensign–Ford	+1.99
17	(France) Jean-Pierre Jarier	Ligier–Matra	+2.02
18	(Sweden) Ronnie Peterson	Tyrrell–Ford	+2.03
19	(Japan) Noritake Takahara	Kojima–Ford	+2.13
20	(Canada) Gilles Villeneuve	Ferrari	+2.28
21	(Austria) Hans Binder	Surtees–Ford	+2.50
22	(Japan) Kunimitsu Takahashi	Tyrrell–Ford	+2.65
23	(Brazil) Alex Ribeiro	March–Ford	+2.78

=== Race ===
Pos	No	Driver	Constructor	Tyre	Laps	Time/Retired	Grid	Points
1	1	(United Kingdom) James Hunt	McLaren-Ford	G	73	1:31:51.68	2	9
2	12	(Argentina) Carlos Reutemann	Ferrari	G	73	+ 1:02.45	7	6
3	4	(France) Patrick Depailler	Tyrrell-Ford	G	73	+ 1:06.39	15	4
4	17	(Australia) Alan Jones	Shadow-Ford	G	73	+ 1:06.61	12	3
5	26	(France) Jacques Laffite	Ligier-Matra	G	72	Out of Fuel	5	2
6	16	(Italy) Riccardo Patrese	Shadow-Ford	G	72	+ 1 Lap	13	1
7	8	(West Germany) Hans-Joachim Stuck	Brabham-Alfa Romeo	G	72	+ 1 Lap	4	
8	19	(Italy) Vittorio Brambilla	Surtees-Ford	G	71	+ 2 Laps	9	
9	50	(Japan) Kunimitsu Takahashi	Tyrrell-Ford	D	71	+ 2 Laps	22	
10	20	(South Africa) Jody Scheckter	Wolf-Ford	G	71	+ 2 Laps	6	
11	52	(Japan) Kazuyoshi Hoshino	Kojima-Ford	B	71	+ 2 Laps	11	
12	9	(Brazil) Alex Ribeiro	March-Ford	G	69	+ 4 Laps	23	
Ret	6	(Sweden) Gunnar Nilsson	Lotus-Ford	G	63	Gearbox	14	
Ret	22	(Switzerland) Clay Regazzoni	Ensign-Ford	G	43	Engine	10	
Ret	7	(United Kingdom) John Watson	Brabham-Alfa Romeo	G	29	Gearbox	3	
Ret	2	(West Germany) Jochen Mass	McLaren-Ford	G	28	Engine	8	
Ret	23	(France) Patrick Tambay	Ensign-Ford	G	14	Engine	16	
Ret	3	(Sweden) Ronnie Peterson	Tyrrell-Ford	G	5	Accident	18	
Ret	11	(Canada) Gilles Villeneuve	Ferrari	G	5	Accident	20	
Ret	27	(France) Jean-Pierre Jarier	Ligier-Matra	G	3	Engine	17	
Ret	5	(United States) Mario Andretti	Lotus-Ford	G	1	Collision	1	
Ret	51	(Japan) Noritake Takahara	Kojima-Ford	B	1	Collision	19	
Ret	18	(Austria) Hans Binder	Surtees-Ford	G	1	Collision	21	

== Notes ==
- Japanese driver Kunimitsu Takahashi made his Formula One World Championship debut in this race.
- This race saw the fifth-fastest lap set by a South African driver.
- This race marked the 299th and 300th podium finishes for a Ford-powered car.
- This race saw the final F1 victory by James Hunt, and the last by a British driver until John Watson won the 1981 British Grand Prix.
- This was the final F1 race for Swedish driver Gunnar Nilsson.

== Final championship standings ==
Drivers' Championship standings

Pos	Driver	Points
1	(Austria) **Niki Lauda**	72
2	(South Africa) Jody Scheckter	55
3	(United States) Mario Andretti	47
4	(Argentina) Carlos Reutemann	42
5	(United Kingdom) James Hunt	40

Constructors' Championship standings

	Pos	Constructor	Points
	1	(Italy) **Ferrari**	95 (97)
	2	(United Kingdom) Lotus-Ford	62
1	3	(United Kingdom) McLaren-Ford	60
1	4	(Canada) Wolf-Ford	55
	5	(United Kingdom) Brabham-Alfa Romeo	27

- Note: Only the top five positions are included for both sets of standings. Only the best 8 results from the first 9 races and the best 7 results from the remaining 8 races were retained. Numbers without parentheses are retained points; numbers in parentheses are total points scored.
- **Bold text** indicates the 1977 World Champions.

Previous race: 1977 Canadian Grand Prix	FIA Formula One World Championship; 1977 season	Next race: 1978 Argentine Grand Prix
Previous race: 1976 Japanese Grand Prix	Japanese Grand Prix	Next race: 1987 Japanese Grand Prix
