= 1977 Monaco Grand Prix =

Coordinates: 43°44′4.74″N 7°25′16.8″E

- Race 6 of 17 in the 1977 Formula One season
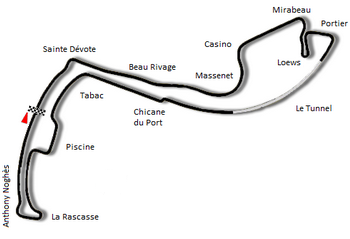

Race details
- Date: 22 May 1977
- Official name: XXXV Grand Prix Automobile de Monaco
- Location: Circuit de Monaco
- Course: Street circuit
- Course length: 3.312 km (2.057 miles)
- Distance: 76 laps, 251.712 km (156.406 miles)
- Weather: Dry

Pole position
Driver	(United Kingdom) John Watson	Brabham-Alfa Romeo
- Time: 1:29.86

Fastest lap
Driver	(South Africa) Jody Scheckter	Wolf-Ford
- Time: 1:31.07 on lap 35

Podium
First	(South Africa) Jody Scheckter	Wolf-Ford
Second	(Austria) Niki Lauda	Ferrari
Third	(Argentina) Carlos Reutemann	Ferrari

The 1977 Monaco Grand Prix was a Formula One motor race held at Monaco on 22 May 1977. It was the sixth race of the 1977 World Championship of F1 Drivers and the 1977 International Cup for F1 Constructors.

The 76-lap race was won by South African driver Jody Scheckter, driving a Wolf-Ford. It was Scheckter's second victory of the season, and the 100th World Championship race victory for the Ford-backed Cosworth DFV engine. Austrian Niki Lauda finished second in a Ferrari, with Argentinian teammate Carlos Reutemann third.

== Background ==
The race weekend was sometimes rainy, with Saturday qualifying in particular being a wash. Between the rain and the increased admission fees, this year marked low numbers of spectators. Since the race weekend lasted from Thursday until Sunday (with Friday being a break for the teams), the casinos lost revenue as they were not accessible to tourists during the days of the race - the organizers tried to make up for these shortfalls by increasing ticket prices. The race marked the debut of Riccardo Patrese, who had been making a name for himself in Formula Two. Shadow's sponsor, grain magnate Francesco Ambrosio, gave Patrese Renzo Zorzi's seat, but neglected to tell Zorzi, who arrived at Monaco only to see Patrese's name on "his" car.

25 entries competed for 20 spots on the grid for this race. Brabham presented a new experimental rear wing design, nicknamed "the barn door" for its large, upright rear flap. The wing was also fitted with longitudinal ribs. The design appeared to have worked, with Brabham dominating practice and qualifying first and fifth. In other developments, three teams (McLaren, Tyrrell, and Lotus) were working together with Cosworth to develop a new, lightweight derivative of the DFV engine - this new variant weighed 9 kg (20 lb) less and also produced two percent more power. Reportedly, Hunt, Peterson, and Andretti were given the new lightweight DFV engine for Monaco but they seem to have raced with the regular engine.

== Qualifying ==
After the first timed session, Hans-Joachim Stuck and John Watson put the B in first and second on the grid. The second session rained out, but in the final (Saturday) qualifying session, Watson went even faster and secured pole position - for the first time in his Formula One career. Stuck's engine malfunctioned for this session and he could not better his time from Thursday and ended up starting in fifth. Scheckter took second in the Wolf, with Reutemann third, Peterson fourth, and Lauda in sixth. Andretti proved unable to match his pace from recent races and started in tenth, stating that "the track was too narrow for the Lotus 78". Meanwhile, his teammate Nilsson qualified 13th on the grid.

Newcomer Patrese took the fifteenth starting position, while Jacky Ickx made a rare appearance. After having set a time on Thursday, Clay Regazzoni the rain precluded him bettering it on Saturday morning. He then flew to the United States to qualify for the Indianapolis 500 in a McLaren-Offenhauser for Theodore Racing (he had crashed in the previous week's session and only Saturday and Sunday remained available for setting a time). He did not make it in time, forcing him to stay in Indianapolis for Sunday as well. Ickx was hastily called up to take his seat, qualifying 17th on the grid, behind Laffite whose car was off the pace after a strong showing in Spain. The non-qualifiers included all four Marches and Harald Ertl's Hesketh.

== Race ==
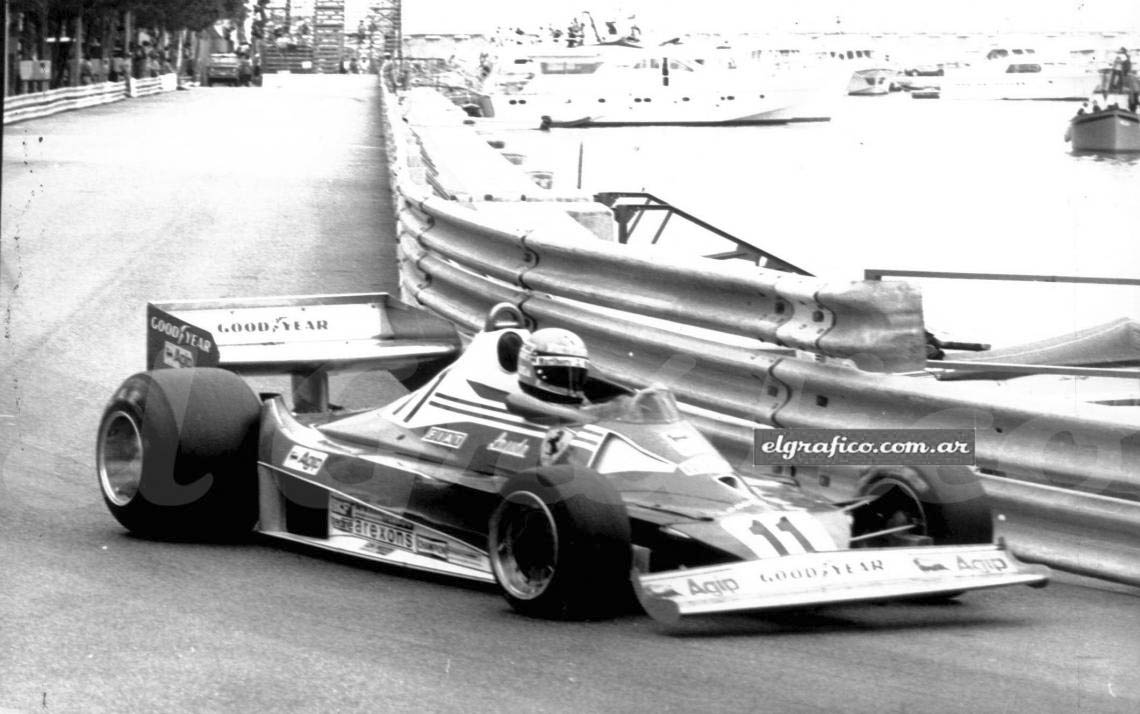
Niki Lauda at the Grand Prix

While there was rain in the morning, it had dried up by the time of the start. The teams had all readied rain tyres but those were never used during the race. At the start, first-time pole sitter Watson spun his wheels on the painted crosswalk at the starting line, allowing Scheckter to beat him to the first corner, with Reutemann running third. There were no retirements or serious incidents on the first lap, although Patrese rear-ended Nilsson's Lotus, damaging his nosecone and Nilsson's gear selector. Nilsson ended up retiring on lap 51 as a result of damage to his gearbox. The first three cars were followed by Stuck, Peterson, Lauda, and Hunt. A second pack of cars comprising Depailler, Andretti, and Mass rounded out the top ten a few laps into the race. Behind them sat a third group: Jones, Jarier, Nilsson, and Brambilla, followed by freshman Patrese and veteran Ickx who had a nearly race-long battle.

On the eighth lap, fifth-placed Peterson began slowing down, retiring two laps later with a complete loss of brakes. Fourth-placed Stuck had a small fire on lap 19 and also retired. With Stuck and Peterson out of the way, Lauda caught up to his teammate Reutemann and soon passed him for third place. A valve broke in Hunt's engine and he was out on lap 25, around which time Jarier pitted to change a punctured tire and dropped to last position as a result. About halfway through the race, Watson (in second place to Scheckter began slowing down as his brakes were becoming spongy. A little later, his gear shift began causing trouble, causing him to go off the track on lap 45. He rejoined, but as he was approaching the hill to Sainte Dévote on lap 48 the transmission jammed entirely, causing him to spin out and retire. This put Lauda in second, 14 seconds behind Scheckter and with Reutemann another thirty seconds behind.

Mass and Andretti were running fourth and fifth; Depailler retired with brake problems on lap 46, leaving Jones in the final, points-scoring position. After Nilsson retired on lap 51, Brambilla was in seventh and Laffite eighth; these standings remained until the end except that Laffite made his way around Brambilla after the latter's facemask shifted and obstructed his view. Scheckter's day was not perfect, though: his fuel pump was giving out and would starve the engine of fuel at times, allowing Lauda to catch up. This would have meant retirement if it had happened earlier, but as it were, Scheckter turned on the auxiliary fuel pump (used for starting) and left it on for the few remaining laps. Lauda's car, however, had begun to develop an oversteering habit in the closing stages, and since Scheckter's was once again back on pace Lauda had to be satisfied with second, with Reutemann completing the podium.

Shadow driver Riccardo Patrese made his first career start in the race, qualifying 15th and finishing 9th. Patrese would drive in a record 257 Grands Prix (256 starts) during his career which ended after the 1993 season, a career which included winning at Monaco for Brabham in 1982. The race also marked the 100th Grand Prix win for a Cosworth-Ford-powered car, ten years after the DFV's first victory in 1967. Cosworth-Ford tried to bring a blue-and-white cake to the podium for Scheckter and Prince Rainier to celebrate, but between the crowd entering the track and overzealous police, the cake did not make it.

== Classification ==
=== Qualifying classification ===
Pos.	Driver	Constructor	Time	No
1	(United Kingdom) John Watson	Brabham-Alfa Romeo	1:29.86	1
2	(South Africa) Jody Scheckter	Wolf-Ford	1:30.27	2
3	(Argentina) Carlos Reutemann	Ferrari	1:30.44	3
4	(Sweden) Ronnie Peterson	Tyrrell-Ford	1:30.72	4
5	(West Germany) Hans-Joachim Stuck	Brabham-Alfa Romeo	1:30.73	5
6	(Austria) Niki Lauda	Ferrari	1:30.76	6
7	(United Kingdom) James Hunt	McLaren-Ford	1:30.85	7
8	(France) Patrick Depailler	Tyrrell-Ford	1:31.16	8
9	(West Germany) Jochen Mass	McLaren-Ford	1:31.36	9
10	(United States) Mario Andretti	Lotus-Ford	1:31.50	10
11	(Australia) Alan Jones	Shadow-Ford	1:32.04	11
12	(France) Jean-Pierre Jarier	Penske-Ford	1:32.32	12
13	(Sweden) Gunnar Nilsson	Lotus-Ford	1:32.37	13
14	(Italy) Vittorio Brambilla	Surtees-Ford	1:32.40	14
15	(Italy) Riccardo Patrese	Shadow-Ford	1:32.52	15
16	(France) Jacques Laffite	Ligier-Matra	1:32.65	16
17	(Belgium) Jacky Ickx	Ensign-Ford	1:33.25	17
18	(Brazil) Emerson Fittipaldi	Fittipaldi-Ford	1:33.39	18
19	(Austria) Hans Binder	Surtees-Ford	1:33.49	19
20	(United Kingdom) Rupert Keegan	Hesketh-Ford	1:33.78	20
Cut-off
21	(Italy) Arturo Merzario	March-Ford	1:34.46	—
22	(Netherlands) Boy Hayje	March-Ford	1:34.48	—
23	(Austria) Harald Ertl	Hesketh-Ford	1:34.74	—
24	(Switzerland) Clay Regazzoni	Ensign-Ford	1:35.00	—
25	(Brazil) Alex Ribeiro	March-Ford	1:36.62	—
26	(South Africa) Ian Scheckter	March-Ford	1:46.30	—

=== Race classification ===
Pos	No	Driver	Constructor	Laps	Time/Retired	Grid	Points
1	20	(South Africa) Jody Scheckter	Wolf-Ford	76	1:57:52.77	2	9
2	11	(Austria) Niki Lauda	Ferrari	76	+ 0.89	6	6
3	12	(Argentina) Carlos Reutemann	Ferrari	76	+ 32.80	3	4
4	2	(West Germany) Jochen Mass	McLaren-Ford	76	+ 34.60	9	3
5	5	(United States) Mario Andretti	Lotus-Ford	76	+ 35.55	10	2
6	17	(Australia) Alan Jones	Shadow-Ford	76	+ 36.61	11	1
7	26	(France) Jacques Laffite	Ligier-Matra	76	+ 1:04.44	16	
8	19	(Italy) Vittorio Brambilla	Surtees-Ford	76	+ 1:08.64	14	
9	16	(Italy) Riccardo Patrese	Shadow-Ford	75	+ 1 Lap	15	
10	22	(Belgium) Jacky Ickx	Ensign-Ford	75	+ 1 Lap	17	
11	34	(France) Jean-Pierre Jarier	Penske-Ford	74	+ 2 Laps	12	
12	24	(United Kingdom) Rupert Keegan	Hesketh-Ford	73	+ 3 Laps	20	
Ret	6	(Sweden) Gunnar Nilsson	Lotus-Ford	51	Gearbox	13	
Ret	7	(United Kingdom) John Watson	Brabham-Alfa Romeo	48	Gearbox	1	
Ret	4	(France) Patrick Depailler	Tyrrell-Ford	46	Gearbox	8	
Ret	18	(Austria) Hans Binder	Surtees-Ford	41	Fuel System	19	
Ret	28	(Brazil) Emerson Fittipaldi	Fittipaldi-Ford	37	Engine	18	
Ret	1	(United Kingdom) James Hunt	McLaren-Ford	25	Engine	7	
Ret	8	(West Germany) Hans-Joachim Stuck	Brabham-Alfa Romeo	19	Electrical	5	
Ret	3	(Sweden) Ronnie Peterson	Tyrrell-Ford	10	Brakes	4	
DNQ	37	(Italy) Arturo Merzario	March-Ford				
DNQ	33	(Netherlands) Boy Hayje	March-Ford				
DNQ	25	(Austria) Harald Ertl	Hesketh-Ford				
DNQ	22	(Switzerland) Clay Regazzoni	Ensign-Ford		Left for the Indianapolis 500		
DNQ	9	(Brazil) Alex Ribeiro	March-Ford				
DNQ	10	(South Africa) Ian Scheckter	March-Ford				

== Championship standings after the race ==
Drivers' Championship standings

	Pos	Driver	Points
	1	(South Africa) Jody Scheckter	32
2	2	(Austria) Niki Lauda	25
	3	(Argentina) Carlos Reutemann	23
2	4	(United States) Mario Andretti	22
	5	(United Kingdom) James Hunt	9

Constructors' Championship standings

Pos	Constructor	Points
1	(Italy) Ferrari	40
2	(Canada) Wolf-Ford	32
3	(United Kingdom) Lotus-Ford	24
4	(United Kingdom) McLaren-Ford	15
5	(United Kingdom) Brabham-Alfa Romeo	8

- Note: Only the top five positions are included for both sets of standings.

Previous race: 1977 Spanish Grand Prix	FIA Formula One World Championship; 1977 season	Next race: 1977 Belgian Grand Prix
Previous race: 1976 Monaco Grand Prix	Monaco Grand Prix	Next race: 1978 Monaco Grand Prix
