= Fittipaldi FD =

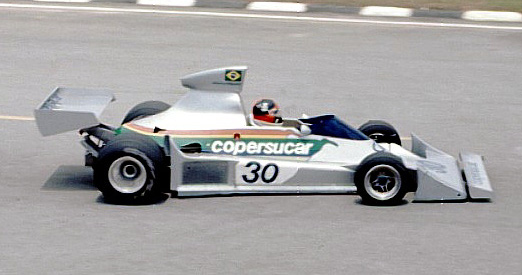
- Fittipaldi FD04, 1976
- Category: Formula One
- Constructor: Fittipaldi
- Designer: Richard Divila
- Successor: Fittipaldi F5

Technical specifications
- Chassis: Aluminium alloy monocoque
- Axle track: Front: 1,500 mm (59 in); Rear: 1,560 mm (61 in) (FD04); Front: 1,500 mm (59 in); Rear: 1,550 mm (61 in) (FD03)
- Wheelbase: 2,341 mm (92.2 in)
- Engine: Ford Cosworth DFV 2,993 cc (182.6 cu in) V8 naturally aspirated, mid-mounted
- Transmission: Hewland FG/FGA 400 6-speed manual
- Weight: 602 kg (1,327 lb) (FD03); 640 kg (1,410 lb) (FD04)
- Tyres: Goodyear

Competition history
- Notable entrants: Copersucar-Fittipaldi
- Notable drivers: (Brazil) Emerson Fittipaldi
- Debut: 1975 Argentine Grand Prix
Races	Wins	Poles	F/Laps
37	0	0	0
- Constructors' Championships: 0
- Drivers' Championships: 0
- Unless otherwise stated, all data refer to Formula One World Championship Grands Prix only.

The Fittipaldi FD was a series of Formula One chassis designed by Richard Divila and used by Fittipaldi Automotive in the 1975, 1976 and 1977 seasons. The initial chassis was designated Fittipaldi FD01 and there were three minor developments designated, Fittipaldi FD02, Fittipaldi FD03 and Fittipaldi FD04 respectively. FD series cars competed in 37 races making 43 individual entries in total. The chassis achieved a best finish of fourth place at both the 1977 Argentine and Brazilian Grands Prix driven on each occasion by former World Champion and joint team-owner Emerson Fittipaldi. It scored a total of 11 World Championship points.

== Development ==
Fittipaldi was formed by the Fittipaldi Brothers (Wilson and Emerson). In late 1973, the brothers decided to start their own Formula One team. The 1974 season was spent setting up the new team, which was to have a strong Brazilian flavour. Wilson was able to persuade Brazilian sugar and alcohol cooperative Copersucar to act as sponsor. Emerson acted as a consultant to the team whilst still driving for McLaren. The Copersucar-branded car was designed by Brazilian Richard Divila, who had worked for Fittipaldi, designing Formula Vee and Formula Two cars, and modifying their Lotus and Brabham chassis. National aerospace company Embraer was also involved, supplying materials to the fledgling team and providing wind-tunnel time. Mexican Jo Ramírez was hired as team manager. The team was based in Brazil, almost 6,000 miles (10,000 km) away from the United Kingdom, a bold move given the overwhelmingly British nature of Formula One technology from the 1960s onwards. The long and low FD01, with bulbous bodywork enclosing the engine and unusual rear-mounted radiators, painted in silver with rainbow markings on the flanks, was unveiled in October 1974 at the Federal Senate in Brasília in the presence of President Ernesto Geisel. Like Brabham's BT series of cars (Brabham and Tauranac), the car's FD designation reflected the initials of the driver and the designer (Fittipaldi and Divila).

== Racing history ==
=== 1975 ===
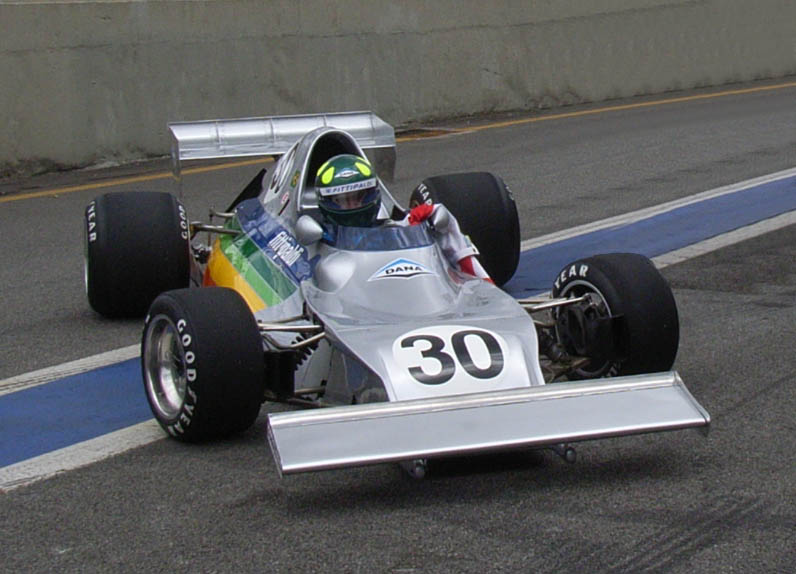
Fittipaldi FD01 (Wilson Fittipaldi)

The chassis' first race was the Argentine Grand Prix. Wilson retired after he crashed the FD01, the car subsequently catching fire, on lap 13 of its only race. The FD01 was uncompetitive and was replaced by the Fittipaldi FD02 which had a bigger airbox and new sidepods.

The Fittipaldi FD02 was raced six times in 1975. Its debut was at the Brazilian Grand Prix. Wilson finished 12th. Then he failed to qualify for South Africa. Fittipaldi withdrew from the Spanish Grand Prix protesting that the barriers at the Montjuich circuit were not bolted together properly. Then he failed to qualify for Monaco, because the grid was staggered and in addition was restricted to just 18 cars. Fittipaldi finished 12th in Belgian and 17th in Sweden. The FD02 was replaced by the Fittipaldi FD03.

The FD03 raced seven times in 1975. Its debut was at the 1975 Dutch Grand Prix where Wilson finished 11th. The Brazilian retired in France with engine failure. Fittipaldi finished 19th at the British Grand Prix, after he, Dave Morgan (Surtees), John Nicholson, (Lyncar), Brian Henton, (Lotus), Tony Brise (Hill), Carlos Pace (Brabham), Jody Scheckter (Tyrrell) and James Hunt (Hesketh) went off at Club Corner and the race was red flagged. The Brazilian retired in Germany when his engine blew. Fittipaldi failed to qualify for the Austrian Grand Prix after crashing in practice and breaking two bones in his hand. Italian Arturo Merzario replaced Fittipaldi for Merzario's home race in Italy and finished 11th. Fittipaldi returned for the United States Grand Prix and finished tenth.

=== 1976 ===
After an unsuccessful 1975 season, Wilson Fittipaldi stepped down from driving to look after the management of the team and was replaced by his brother Emerson. Emerson used the Fittipaldi FD04 all season but the FD03 was also entered on one occasion, in the 1976 Brazilian Grand Prix driven by Ingo Hoffmann. The FD03 was retired before the South African Grand Prix, as a second FD04 had been built, which was driven by Hoffman.

The FD04's first race was the 1976 Brazilian Grand Prix. Driven by Emerson Fittipaldi, it finished 13th. Teammate Hoffmann also from Brazil, finished 11th in the FD03. The team only entered Emerson Fittipaldi for South Africa where he finished seventeenth despite an engine failure. Hoffmann returned for the United States Grand Prix West but failed to qualify and Fittipaldi finished sixth. Hoffmann failed to qualify for Spain and Fittipaldi retired with transmission failure. Fittipaldi failed to qualify for Belgian, finished sixth in Monaco and retired in Sweden due to handling issues on the FD04. Hoffmann returned for the French Grand Prix but failed to qualify and Fittipaldi retired with oil pressure problems. The Brazilian finished sixth in Britain and 13th in Germany. Fittipaldi retired at the Austrian Grand Prix due to an accident. An electrical fault put the Brazilian out of the Dutch Grand Prix. Fittipaldi finished 15th in Italy. Fittipaldi retired at the Canadian Grand Prix due to a broken exhaust. Fittipaldi finished ninth in the United States Grand Prix East and withdrew from Japan after he, Niki Lauda (Ferrari), and the Brabham drivers, Larry Perkins and Carlos Pace, considered the weather conditions made the track too dangerous.

=== 1977 ===
The FD04 was used until the Fittipaldi F5 was ready. The season started at the 1977 Argentine Grand Prix. Fittipaldi finished fourth and Hoffmann retired with engine failure. At Brazil, Fittipaldi finished fourth and Hoffmann seventh. Fittipaldi finished tenth at the 1977 South African Grand Prix, fifth at United States West and 14th at the 1977 Spanish Grand Prix. Fittipaldi retired with engine failure at Monaco then used the F5 in Belgian The FD04 was raced once more, by Fittipaldi at the Swedish Grand Prix where he finished 18th. The FD04 was replaced by the Fittipaldi F5 from the French Grand Prix onwards.

== Complete Formula One World Championship results ==
(key)

Year	Entrant	Chassis	Engine	Tyres	Drivers	1	2	3	4	5	6	7	8	9	10	11	12	13	14	15	16	17	Points	WCC
1975	Copersucar- Fittipaldi	FD01	Ford Cosworth DFV; 3.0 V8	G		ARG	BRA	RSA	ESP	MON	BEL	SWE	NED	FRA	GBR	GER	AUT	ITA	USA				0	-
1975	Copersucar- Fittipaldi	FD01	Ford Cosworth DFV; 3.0 V8	G	Wilson Fittipaldi	Ret																	0	-
1975	Copersucar- Fittipaldi	FD02	Ford Cosworth DFV; 3.0 V8	G	Wilson Fittipaldi		13	DNQ	Ret	DNQ	12	17											0	-
1975	Copersucar- Fittipaldi	FD03	Ford Cosworth DFV; 3.0 V8	G	Wilson Fittipaldi								11	Ret	19	Ret	DNS		10				0	-
1975	Copersucar- Fittipaldi	FD03	Ford Cosworth DFV; 3.0 V8	G	Arturo Merzario													11					0	-
1976	Copersucar- Fittipaldi	FD03	Ford Cosworth DFV; 3.0 V8	G		BRA	RSA	USW	ESP	BEL	MON	SWE	FRA	GBR	GER	AUT	NED	ITA	CAN	USE	JPN		3	11th
1976	Copersucar- Fittipaldi	FD03	Ford Cosworth DFV; 3.0 V8	G	Ingo Hoffmann	11																	3	11th
1976	Copersucar- Fittipaldi	FD04	Ford Cosworth DFV; 3.0 V8	G	Ingo Hoffmann			DNQ	DNQ				DNQ										3	11th
1976	Copersucar- Fittipaldi	FD04	Ford Cosworth DFV; 3.0 V8	G	Emerson Fittipaldi	13	17	6	Ret	DNQ	6	Ret	Ret	6	13	Ret	Ret	15	Ret	9	Ret		3	11th
1977	Copersucar- Fittipaldi	FD04	Ford Cosworth DFV; 3.0 V8	G		ARG	BRA	RSA	USW	ESP	MON	BEL	SWE	FRA	GBR	GER	AUT	NED	ITA	USE	CAN	JPN	11 ‡	9th ‡
1977	Copersucar- Fittipaldi	FD04	Ford Cosworth DFV; 3.0 V8	G	Emerson Fittipaldi	4	4	10	5	14	Ret		18										11 ‡	9th ‡
1977	Copersucar- Fittipaldi	FD04	Ford Cosworth DFV; 3.0 V8	G	Ingo Hoffmann	Ret	7																11 ‡	9th ‡

‡ 3 points scored using the Fittipaldi F5.
