= 1989 German Grand Prix =

- Race 9 of 16 in the 1989 Formula One World Championship

Race details
- Date: 30 July 1989
- Official name: LI Grosser Mobil 1 Preis von Deutschland
- Location: Hockenheimring near Heidelberg, West Germany
- Course: Permanent racing facility
- Course length: 6.802 km (4.227 miles)
- Distance: 45 laps, 305.865 km (190.055 miles)
- Weather: Warm, cloudy

Pole position
Driver	(Brazil) Ayrton Senna	McLaren-Honda
- Time: 1:42.300

Fastest lap
Driver	(Brazil) Ayrton Senna	McLaren-Honda
- Time: 1:45.884 on lap 43

Podium
First	(Brazil) Ayrton Senna	McLaren-Honda
Second	(France) Alain Prost	McLaren-Honda
Third	(United Kingdom) Nigel Mansell	Ferrari

The 1989 German Grand Prix was a Formula One motor race held at the Hockenheimring on 30 July 1989. The race was won by Ayrton Senna, ahead of Alain Prost and Nigel Mansell.

== Background ==
Prior to the race meeting there had been a major shakeup of management at Team Lotus. Long time Lotus man and team boss since Colin Chapman's untimely death in 1982 Peter Warr had been asked to leave the team and was replaced as team manager by Rupert Manwaring, while Lotus also had a new chairman in Tony Rudd.

== Qualifying ==
=== Pre-qualifying report ===
Pre-qualifying had been reorganised going into the second half of the season, with several drivers and teams either losing or gaining the right to progress without the need to pre-qualify. Brabham, Dallara and Rial had scored enough points across the opening rounds of the season to enable them to escape the Friday morning sessions entirely. Larrousse, with their Lamborghini V12-engined Lolas had scored no points thus far, so were required to pre-qualify for Grands Prix. Philippe Alliot was now partnered by Michele Alboreto who had left Tyrrell after a sponsorship dispute, replacing Éric Bernard, who had stood in at Larrousse for two races.

Also new to pre-qualifying was Roberto Moreno, joining his Coloni team-mate Pierre-Henri Raphanel; and Gabriele Tarquini, joining his AGS team-mate Yannick Dalmas in the Friday morning sessions. This was despite Tarquini's sixth-place finish at the Mexican Grand Prix, as Minardi had scored three points at Silverstone. Onyx had also only scored two points so were forced to continue to pre-qualify. Osella, EuroBrun and Zakspeed had scored no points thus far, so also had to continue to pre-qualify.

Bertrand Gachot topped the pre-qualifying session for the third time in a row, with his Onyx team-mate Stefan Johansson second. The two Larrousse-Lola drivers were third and fourth, with Alboreto edging out Dalmas in the AGS by a thousandth of a second. Nicola Larini was sixth in his Osella, with his team-mate Piercarlo Ghinzani again failing at this stage, down in eighth. Moreno and Raphanel were ninth and tenth, with Gregor Foitek eleventh in the new, untested EuroBrun ER189. The Zakspeeds were bottom of the time sheets, with Aguri Suzuki outpacing Bernd Schneider for only the second time this season.

=== Pre-qualifying classification ===
Pos	No	Driver	Constructor	Time	Gap
1	37	(Belgium) Bertrand Gachot	Onyx-Ford	1:47.283	—
2	36	(Sweden) Stefan Johansson	Onyx-Ford	1:47.700	+0.417
3	30	(France) Philippe Alliot	Lola-Lamborghini	1:47.746	+0.463
4	29	(Italy) Michele Alboreto	Lola-Lamborghini	1:47.919	+0.636
5*	41	(France) Yannick Dalmas	AGS-Ford	1:47.920	+0.637
6*	17	(Italy) Nicola Larini	Osella-Ford	1.48.301	+1.018
7*	40	(Italy) Gabriele Tarquini	AGS-Ford	1:48.558	+1.275
8*	18	(Italy) Piercarlo Ghinzani	Osella-Ford	1:48.564	+1.281
9*	31	(Brazil) Roberto Moreno	Coloni-Ford	1:48.567	+1.284
10*	32	(France) Pierre-Henri Raphanel	Coloni-Ford	1:48.780	+1.457
11*	33	(Switzerland) Gregor Foitek	EuroBrun-Judd	1:49.458	+2.175
12*	35	(Japan) Aguri Suzuki	Zakspeed-Yamaha	1:49.527	+2.244
13*	34	(West Germany) Bernd Schneider	Zakspeed-Yamaha	1:50.455	+3.172

* Driver failed to pre-qualify.

=== Qualifying report ===
The McLaren-Honda's of Ayrton Senna and Alain Prost dominated qualifying on the ultra fast Hockenheim circuit, with Senna just under a second faster than Prost, who was himself almost eight-tenths faster than the Ferrari 640 of Nigel Mansell.

During the Friday session Senna ran over a stone which put a sizeable hole in his car's undertray and the resulting damage would require a complete change of car, the problem being that the team only had three of the new transverse gearbox cars in Germany. As a precaution, team manager Jo Ramírez instructed the team's secondary (test) crew, who were on their way to Imola for a week of testing with the new car, to stop in Dijon (eastern France) in case the race team needed a replacement chassis. When Senna's car was deemed too badly damaged, the test crew made their way to Hockenheim and McLaren were back to having three full cars ready for use by Saturday's morning practice.

=== Qualifying classification ===
Pos	No	Driver	Constructor	Q1	Q2	Gap
1	1	(Brazil) Ayrton Senna	McLaren-Honda	1:42.300	1:42.790	—
2	2	(France) Alain Prost	McLaren-Honda	1:43.306	1:43.295	+0.995
3	27	(United Kingdom) Nigel Mansell	Ferrari	1:44.020	1:44.076	+1.720
4	28	(Austria) Gerhard Berger	Ferrari	1:44.467	1:44.509	+2.167
5	6	(Italy) Riccardo Patrese	Williams-Renault	1:45.062	1:44.511	+2.211
6	5	(Belgium) Thierry Boutsen	Williams-Renault	1:45.520	1:44.702	+2.402
7	19	(Italy) Alessandro Nannini	Benetton-Ford	1:45.033	1:45.040	+2.733
8	11	(Brazil) Nelson Piquet	Lotus-Judd	1:47.316	1:45.475	+3.175
9	20	(Italy) Emanuele Pirro	Benetton-Ford	1:46.521	1:45.845	+3.545
10	4	(France) Jean Alesi	Tyrrell-Ford	1:47.551	1:46.888	+4.588
11	26	(France) Olivier Grouillard	Ligier-Ford	1:47.408	1:46.893	+4.593
12	7	(United Kingdom) Martin Brundle	Brabham-Judd	1:47.216	1:47.796	+4.916
13	23	(Italy) Pierluigi Martini	Minardi-Ford	1:48.222	1:47.380	+5.080
14	15	(Brazil) Maurício Gugelmin	March-Judd	1:47.387	1:47.578	+5.087
15	30	(France) Philippe Alliot	Lola-Lamborghini	1:47.486	1:47.566	+5.186
16	8	(Italy) Stefano Modena	Brabham-Judd	1:47.511	1:47.552	+5.211
17	9	(United Kingdom) Derek Warwick	Arrows-Ford	1:47.756	1:47.533	+5.233
18	12	(Japan) Satoru Nakajima	Lotus-Judd	1:48.782	1:47.663	+5.363
19	3	(United Kingdom) Jonathan Palmer	Tyrrell-Ford	1:47.836	1:47.676	+5.376
20	21	(Italy) Alex Caffi	Dallara-Ford	1:48.671	1:47.679	+5.379
21	22	(Italy) Andrea de Cesaris	Dallara-Ford	1:47.879	1:48.005	+5.579
22	16	(Italy) Ivan Capelli	March-Judd	1:48.239	1:48.078	+5.778
23	25	(France) René Arnoux	Ligier-Ford	1:48.266	1:48.598	+5.966
24	36	(Sweden) Stefan Johansson	Onyx-Ford	1:49.935	1:48.348	+6.048
25	10	(United States) Eddie Cheever	Arrows-Ford	1:48.396	1:48.553	+6.096
26	29	(Italy) Michele Alboreto	Lola-Lamborghini	1:48.670	1:48.726	+6.370
27*	24	(Spain) Luis Pérez-Sala	Minardi-Ford	1:49.587	1:48.686	+6.386
28*	37	(Belgium) Bertrand Gachot	Onyx-Ford	1:49.252	1:49.004	+6.704
29*	38	(West Germany) Christian Danner	Rial-Ford	1:50.679	1:49.767	+7.467
EX*	39	(West Germany) Volker Weidler	Rial-Ford	—	—	—

* Driver failed to qualify.

== Race ==
=== Race report ===
The race started with Senna on pole position and Prost alongside him. At the start, Gerhard Berger in the semi-automatic Ferrari made a strong start from fourth, passing both Senna, Prost and his teammate Mansell to lead tinto the first corner with Senna, Prost and Mansell following in succession. At the start, Philippe Alliot went off the track after he was touched from behind by the Minardi of Pierluigi Martini and lost control of his Lola, spinning off into the grass. He was able to rejoin but his race only lasted 20 laps before his Lamborghini developed an oil leak. His new teammate Michele Alboreto was forced out of his first race with Larrousse just past turn 1 on the second lap after his car's electrics failed. Alboreto had qualified 26th and last, only 0.016 ahead of the Minardi of Luis Pérez-Sala.

Berger's lead was to last about a quarter of a lap as a result of the greater power of the Honda V10 engines. Senna had Berger before the first chicane, and Prost outbraked him at the Ostkurve. At the start of the second lap, it was Senna leading from Prost, Berger, Mansell, Thierry Boutsen (Williams-Renault), Alessandro Nannini (Benetton Ford), Emanuele Pirro (Benetton-Ford), Riccardo Patrese (Williams-Renault), and Nelson Piquet (Lotus-Judd).

The McLarens of Senna and Prost and the Ferraris of Mansell and Berger started to pull away from the field, with the Benettons of Pirro and Nannini, and the Williams of Patrese just barely clinging on (Boutsen retired on lap 5 after being punted off by Pirro at the Bremsschikane 2). On lap 14, Mansell had been hounding Berger for 2 laps, Berger had a puncture right when approaching the first chicane, and he went up on the marker, launching his Ferrari in midair, landing on a grassy patch and went across the track, just barely avoiding Mansell and came to rest on the trackside grass.

Prost and Senna were on the limit the entire race and Prost hounded Senna for 16 laps, until he went in for his pit stop for tyres, which was a slow one of 18 seconds (a good pit time during that era was around 6 to 8 seconds) which put Mansell in second place and gave Senna a stronger lead. The next lap, Mansell came into the pits for his tyre change and his pit stop was faster than Prost's but still a poor stop of 11 seconds, which dropped him down back to fourth behind, Senna, Pirro and Prost. Senna decided to take advantage of his lead and came into the pits for his tyre change, his stop was even worse than Prost's, lasting 23 seconds. All 4 wheels were replaced in good time, but team boss Ron Dennis was forced to hold his driver when the left rear wheel changer didn't think he had located the wheel properly and they had to take it back off to get it set right. This dropped the World Champion down to second behind Prost while Pirro, now also in the new Benetton and the only team car left in the race after Nannini's new Ford V8 had succumbed to an electrical misfire on lap 7, had come into the pits for a tyre change and dropped back to fourth behind Mansell.

Pirro crashed into the styrofoam barriers at the stadium entrance on lap 26 and had to be taken to the hospital after one of the barriers had hit his helmet. With Mansell having problems with his Ferrari, Senna and Prost battled for the entire race, as both drivers were driving on the limit. They started trading off fastest laps (the V10 McLaren-Honda's fastest race laps were 1:45.884 (Senna) and 1:45.977 (Prost). The next best race laps were the V12 Ferrari's with Mansell recording a 1:48.722 and Berger a 1:48.931. No other driver in the race lapped under 1:49) and Prost held off Senna for almost the entire race. On lap 43 on the straight heading into the Stadium section, the new transverse gearbox on Prost's McLaren malfunctioned and lost sixth (top) gear allowing Senna, in the process of setting his fastest race lap, to pass him at turn 11. Prost limped around the track for the next 2 laps well over a minute ahead of Mansell and thus in little danger of dropping back any further while Senna cruised around the track to grab his fourth victory of the season, followed by Prost, Mansell, Patrese, Piquet and Derek Warwick (Arrows-Ford) in sixth.

In the post race press conference, Senna refused to speculate on whether he would have been able to pass Prost if he hadn't lost top gear, instead stating that after suffering four straight DNFs (that had handed his teammate a healthy 20 point championship lead as Prost had won 3 of those races), winning was all he was concerned about. For his part, Prost was of the firm belief that he would have had no trouble holding on for the win had he not had a gearbox problem.

=== Race classification ===
Pos	No	Driver	Constructor	Laps	Time/Retired	Grid	Points
1	1	(Brazil) Ayrton Senna	McLaren-Honda	45	1:21:43.302	1	9
2	2	(France) Alain Prost	McLaren-Honda	45	+ 18.151	2	6
3	27	(United Kingdom) Nigel Mansell	Ferrari	45	+ 1:23.254	3	4
4	6	(Italy) Riccardo Patrese	Williams-Renault	44	+ 1 Lap	5	3
5	11	(Brazil) Nelson Piquet	Lotus-Judd	44	+ 1 Lap	8	2
6	9	(United Kingdom) Derek Warwick	Arrows-Ford	44	+ 1 Lap	17	1
7	22	(Italy) Andrea de Cesaris	Dallara-Ford	44	+ 1 Lap	21	
8	7	(United Kingdom) Martin Brundle	Brabham-Judd	44	+ 1 Lap	12	
9	23	(Italy) Pierluigi Martini	Minardi-Ford	44	+ 1 Lap	13	
10	4	(France) Jean Alesi	Tyrrell-Ford	43	+ 2 Laps	10	
11	25	(France) René Arnoux	Ligier-Ford	42	+ 3 Laps	23	
12	10	(United States) Eddie Cheever	Arrows-Ford	40	Fuel System	25	
Ret	8	(Italy) Stefano Modena	Brabham-Judd	37	Engine	16	
Ret	12	(Japan) Satoru Nakajima	Lotus-Judd	36	Spun Off	18	
Ret	16	(Italy) Ivan Capelli	March-Judd	32	Electrical	22	
Ret	15	(Brazil) Maurício Gugelmin	March-Judd	28	Gearbox	14	
Ret	20	(Italy) Emanuele Pirro	Benetton-Ford	26	Spun Off	9	
Ret	30	(France) Philippe Alliot	Lola-Lamborghini	20	Oil Leak	15	
Ret	3	(United Kingdom) Jonathan Palmer	Tyrrell-Ford	16	Engine	19	
Ret	28	(Austria) Gerhard Berger	Ferrari	13	Puncture	4	
Ret	36	(Sweden) Stefan Johansson	Onyx-Ford	8	Overheating	24	
Ret	19	(Italy) Alessandro Nannini	Benetton-Ford	6	Electrical	7	
Ret	5	(Belgium) Thierry Boutsen	Williams-Renault	4	Collision	6	
Ret	21	(Italy) Alex Caffi	Dallara-Ford	2	Engine	20	
Ret	29	(Italy) Michele Alboreto	Lola-Lamborghini	1	Electrical	26	
Ret	26	(France) Olivier Grouillard	Ligier-Ford	0	Gearbox	11	
DNQ	24	(Spain) Luis Pérez-Sala	Minardi-Ford				
DNQ	37	(Belgium) Bertrand Gachot	Onyx-Ford				
DNQ	38	(West Germany) Christian Danner	Rial-Ford				
EX	39	(West Germany) Volker Weidler	Rial-Ford		Push-start		
DNPQ	41	(France) Yannick Dalmas	AGS-Ford				
DNPQ	17	(Italy) Nicola Larini	Osella-Ford				
DNPQ	40	(Italy) Gabriele Tarquini	AGS-Ford				
DNPQ	18	(Italy) Piercarlo Ghinzani	Osella-Ford				
DNPQ	31	(Brazil) Roberto Moreno	Coloni-Ford				
DNPQ	32	(France) Pierre-Henri Raphanel	Coloni-Ford				
DNPQ	33	(Switzerland) Gregor Foitek	Euro Brun-Judd				
DNPQ	35	(Japan) Aguri Suzuki	Zakspeed-Yamaha				
DNPQ	34	(West Germany) Bernd Schneider	Zakspeed-Yamaha				

== Championship standings after the race ==
Drivers' Championship standings

Pos	Driver	Points
1	(France) Alain Prost	53
2	(Brazil) Ayrton Senna	36
3	(United Kingdom) Nigel Mansell	25
4	(Italy) Riccardo Patrese	25
5	(Belgium) Thierry Boutsen	13

Constructors' Championship standings

Pos	Constructor	Points
1	(United Kingdom) McLaren-Honda	89
2	(United Kingdom) Williams-Renault	38
3	(Italy) Ferrari	25
4	(United Kingdom) Benetton-Ford	17
5	(United Kingdom) Tyrrell-Ford	10

- Note: Only the top five positions are included for both sets of standings.

Previous race: 1989 British Grand Prix	FIA Formula One World Championship; 1989 season	Next race: 1989 Hungarian Grand Prix
Previous race: 1988 German Grand Prix	German Grand Prix	Next race: 1990 German Grand Prix
