= Richard Divila =

Brazilian motorsports designer (1945–2020)

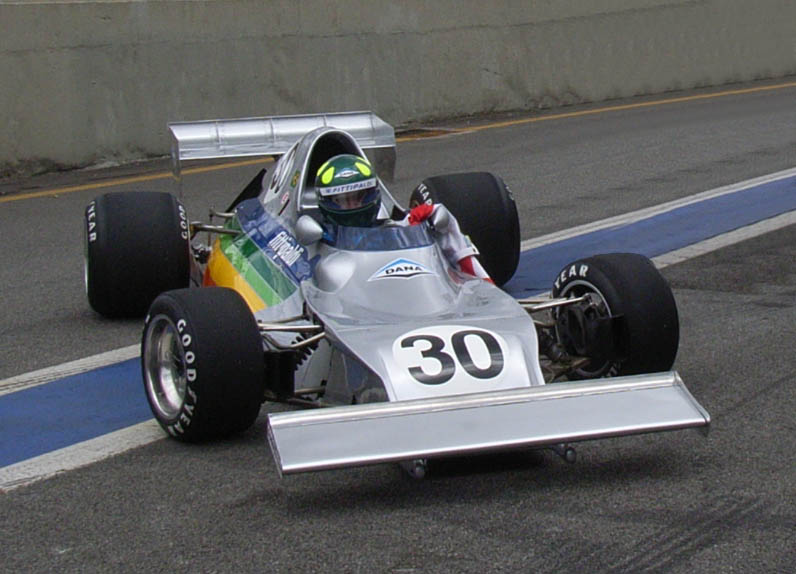
The Fittipaldi FD01, Divila's first F1 car, seen here restored and driven by its original pilot, Wilson Fittipaldi.

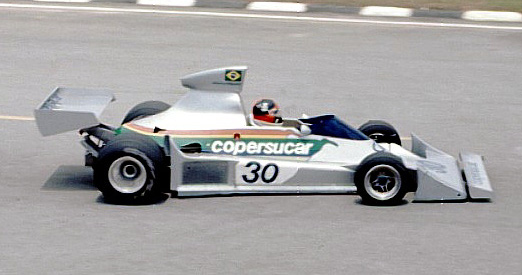
The Fittipaldi FD04 was Divila's last design for Fittipaldi. It is seen here during the 1976 season with two-time world champion Emerson Fittipaldi at the wheel.

Ricardo Ramsey "Richard" Divila (30 May 1945 – 25 April 2020) was a Brazilian motorsports designer. He worked in Formula One, Formula Two, Formula Three, Formula 3000, Super Formula, IndyCar, touring car racing, sports car racing, rallying, rally raid, ice racing, truck racing, among other disciplines.

== Life and career ==
Divila was born in São Paulo. He had a very close relationship with Wilson and Emerson Fittipaldi. He started by designing Formula Vee and various sports cars for them in Brazil in the 1960s, including the famous Fittipaldi twin-engine Volkswagen Beetle that developed 410 bhp for 407 kg. When the brothers established the Fittipaldi Automotive team in Formula One he became the technical director and designed the team's first three cars. These three cars had the name "FD" based on Fittipaldi's "F" and Divila's "D" like the Brabham's "BT" (Jack Brabham and Ron Tauranac). He remained with the team until it closed down in 1982.

Divila founded his own research, development and consulting company in the 1980s. His early customers included March, Jordan, and several IndyCar teams.

Between 1988 and 1989, he designed a Formula One car for Lamberto Leoni, a former F1 driver who intended to enter his FIRST GP team in the 1989 championship. Although the team had contracts with Judd and Pirelli as engine and tyre suppliers, and with Gabriele Tarquini as a driver, the team did not race that year. It was Divila's last chance to see an F1 car designed by him racing, especially as his designs were altered to become the L190 run by the short-lived Life Racing Engines.

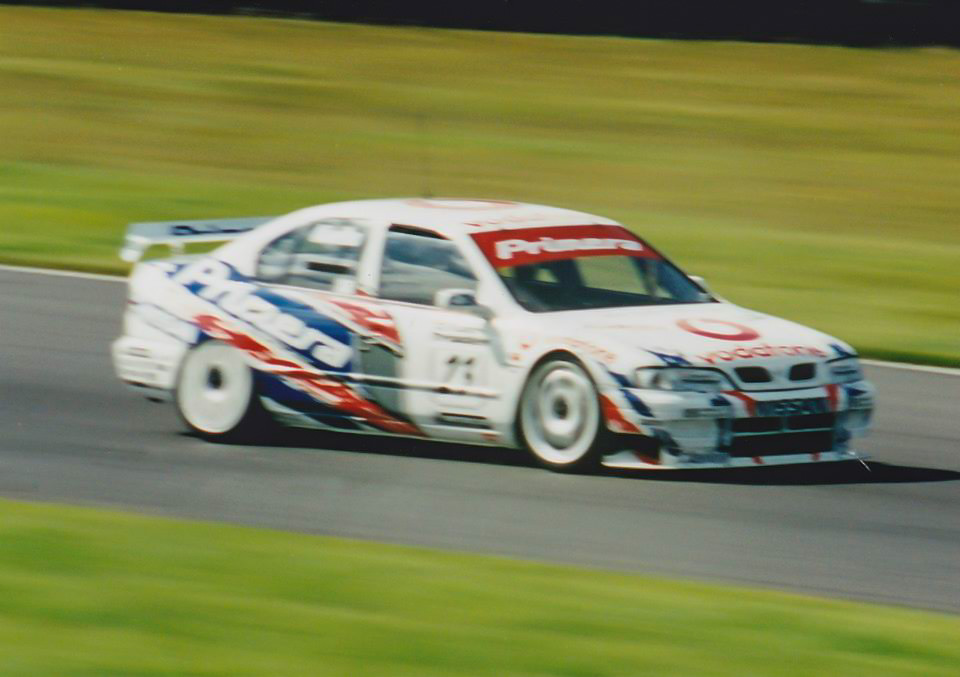
Divila was part of Nissan's 1999 BTCC winning campaign

Despite the F1RST Racing fiasco Divila held various roles in different F1 teams between 1989 and 2001, including Ligier, Fondmetal, Minardi, and Prost.

Between his 1990s F1 stints he worked for the Apomatox Formula 3000 team from 1992 to 1995.

Divila held a close relationship with Nissan over several decades, working for its BTCC, rallying, ice racing, rally raid, JGTC, Super GT, Formula Nippon, GT1, GT3, Deltawing and LMP1 programs.

Aside from his Nissan duties he had a close, long-term collaboration with Courage and Pescarolo at Le Mans in the 1990s and 2000s.

Divila was a regular columnist for the British magazine Racecar Engineering from 2012 to 2020. He was known for his eclectic and idiosyncratic approach to racing engineering and history that included his own personal interests such as literature or philosophy. During the same period, Divila developed a cult following on Twitter on the pseudonymous account @RDV69, where he was known for exploring similar topics, while talking as multiple alter egos such as the Platypus of Doom or the Clam of Calamity.

He died in Magny-Cours (France) on April 25, 2020, at the age of 74, after a stroke. Divila was still actively working as an engineer and columnist until his stroke caused him to fall into a short coma. He estimated that he worked at over 2000 races in various roles over the course of his life.
