= Fittipaldi F5 =

Fittipaldi F5/F5A
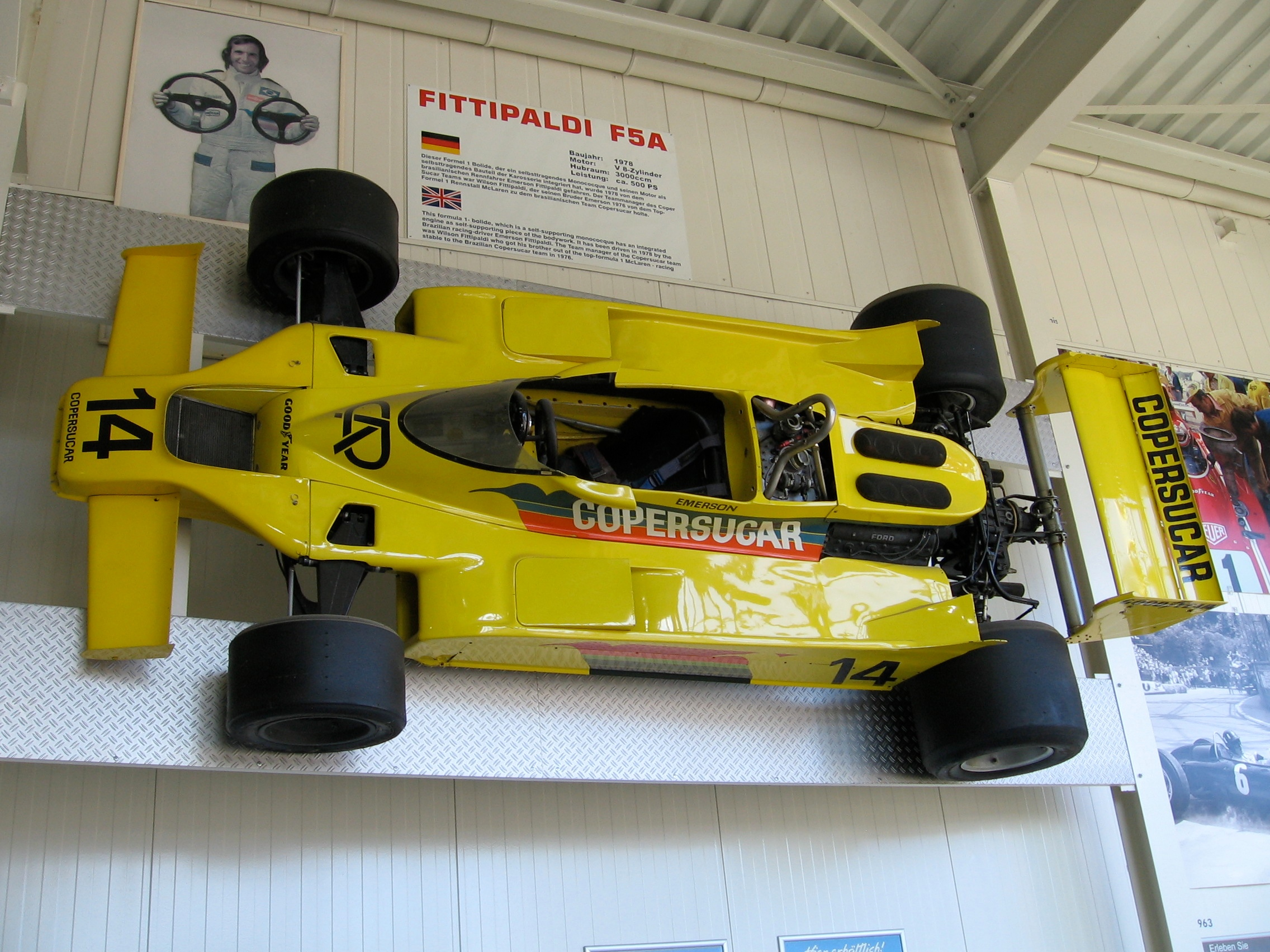
- The Fittipaldi F5A on show at the Sinsheim Auto & Technik Museum
- Category: Formula One
- Constructor: Fittipaldi Automotive
- Designers: Dave Baldwin (F5); Giacomo Caliri (F5A)
- Predecessor: Fittipaldi FD04
- Successor: Fittipaldi F6

Technical specifications
- Chassis: Aluminium alloy monocoque
- Suspension (front): Double wishbones, coil springs
- Suspension (rear): Double wishbones, coil springs
- Axle track: F: 1,524 mm (60.0 in); R: 1,575 mm (62.0 in) (F5); F: 1,676 mm (66.0 in); R: 1,626 mm (64.0 in) (F5A)
- Wheelbase: 2,616 mm (103.0 in) (F5); 2,718 mm (107.0 in) (F5A)
- Engine: Ford Cosworth DFV 2,993 cc (182.6 cu in) V8 naturally aspirated, mid-mounted
- Transmission: Hewland FG400 6-speed (F5); 5-speed (F5A) manual
- Weight: 601 kg (1,325 lb) (F5); 615 kg (1,356 lb) (F5A)
- Fuel: FINA (1977); Shell (1978–1979)
- Tyres: Goodyear

Competition history
- Notable entrants: Copersucar-Fittipaldi; Fittipaldi Automotive
- Notable drivers: (Brazil) Emerson Fittipaldi
- Debut: 1977 Belgian Grand Prix
Races	Wins	Poles	F/Laps
37	0	0	0
- Constructors' Championships: 0
- Drivers' Championships: 0
- Unless otherwise stated, all data refer to Formula One World Championship Grands Prix only.

The Fittipaldi F5 was a Formula One car for the 1977 Formula One season. It was driven by Brazilian Emerson Fittipaldi. The engine was a Ford Cosworth DFV, with the car achieving three of the team's 11 points from that season. The car was modified to become the F5A, which was used for the 1978 season and part of the 1979 season. Fittipaldi was the sole driver of the car in all three seasons. The car was succeeded by the Fittipaldi F6A.

== History ==
The F5 was first tested at Silverstone on 17 May and made its racing debut at the Belgian Grand Prix in early June. The F5 was designed by Dave Baldwin, previously with Lotus and Ensign, and was described as a carbon copy of the Ensign N177, the only difference being that the Fittipaldi had two split radiators on each side. The front suspension was a double, steel wishbone design with the coil/damper mounted inboard.

After Formula One, Fittipaldi F5s continued to be used in the Aurora F1 Championship in 1978, 1979, and 1980 and later in historic racing, winning the 2017 Historic Formula One Championship.

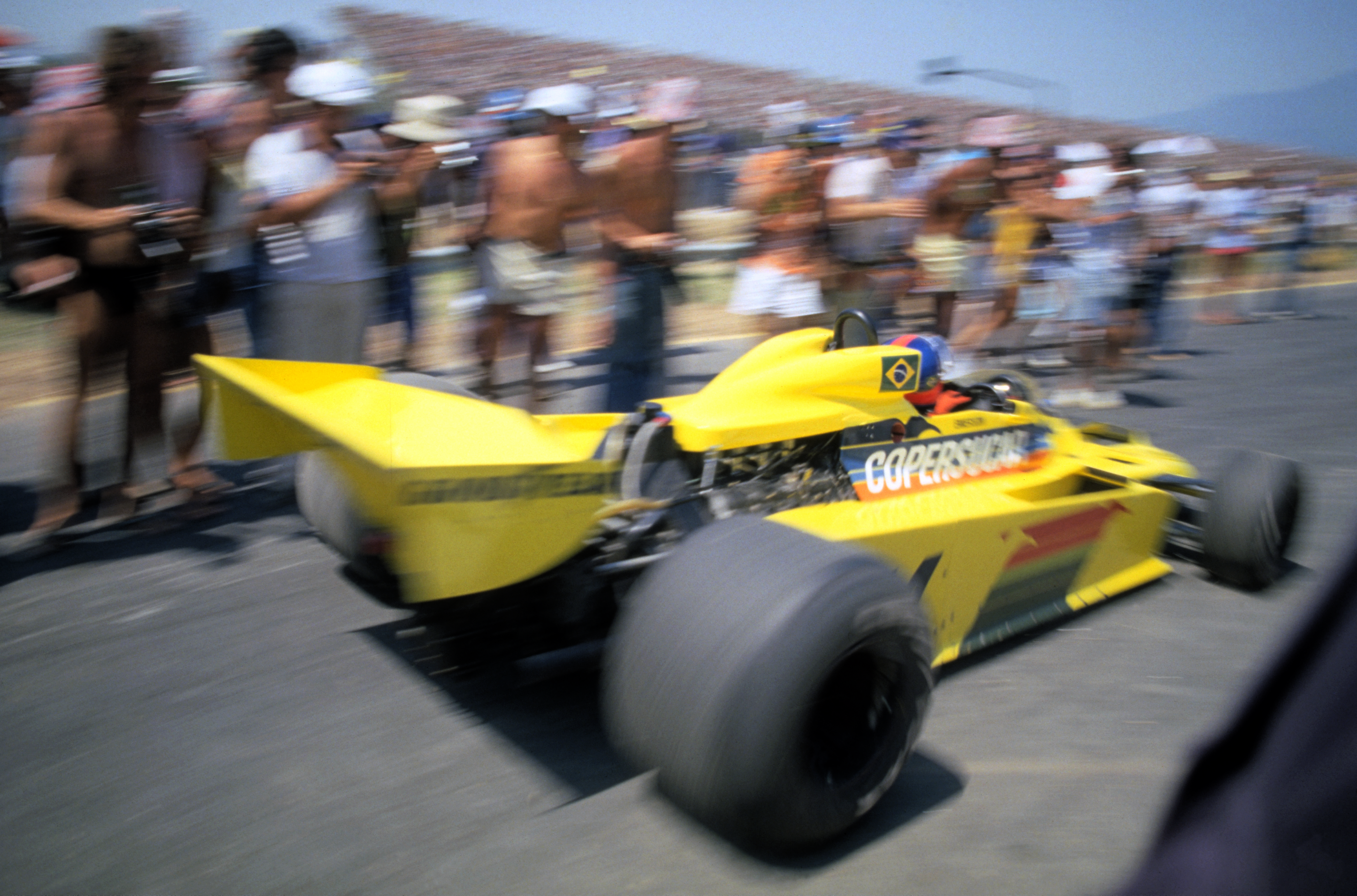
Emerson Fittipaldi driving the F5A at the 1978 Brazilian Grand Prix.

== Formula One World Championship results ==
(key)

Year	Entrant	Chassis	Engine	Tyres	Drivers	1	2	3	4	5	6	7	8	9	10	11	12	13	14	15	16	17	Points	WCC
1977	Copersucar Fittipaldi	F5	Ford Cosworth DFV 3.0 V8	G		ARG	BRA	RSA	USW	ESP	MON	BEL	SWE	FRA	GBR	GER	AUT	NED	ITA	USA	CAN	JPN	11^{1}	9th^{1}
1977	Copersucar Fittipaldi	F5	Ford Cosworth DFV 3.0 V8	G	Emerson Fittipaldi							Ret	PO	11	Ret	DNQ	11	4	DNQ	13	Ret		11^{1}	9th^{1}
1978	Fittipaldi Automotive	F5A	Ford Cosworth DFV 3.0 V8	G		ARG	BRA	RSA	USW	MON	BEL	ESP	SWE	FRA	GBR	GER	AUT	NED	ITA	USA	CAN		17	7th
1978	Fittipaldi Automotive	F5A	Ford Cosworth DFV 3.0 V8	G	Emerson Fittipaldi	9	2	Ret	8	9	Ret	Ret	6	Ret	Ret	4	4	5	8	5	Ret		17	7th
1979	Fittipaldi Automotive	F5A	Ford Cosworth DFV 3.0 V8	G		ARG	BRA	RSA	USW	ESP	BEL	MON	FRA	GBR	GER	AUT	NED	ITA	CAN	USA			1	12th
1979	Fittipaldi Automotive	F5A	Ford Cosworth DFV 3.0 V8	G	Emerson Fittipaldi	6	11	PO	Ret	11	9	Ret	Ret	Ret		PO	PO						1	12th

^1 Points also scored by the FD04 chassis.
