= Fittipaldi Automotive =

Brazilian racecar team

Fittipaldi
- Full name: Fittipaldi Automotive
- Base: São Paulo, Brazil (1975–1977) and Reading, Berkshire, UK (1977–1982)
- Founder(s): Wilson Fittipaldi; Emerson Fittipaldi
- Noted staff: Richard Divila; Jo Ramírez; Adrian Newey; Harvey Postlethwaite
- Noted drivers: (Brazil) Wilson Fittipaldi (Brazil) Emerson Fittipaldi (Finland) Keke Rosberg (Brazil) Chico Serra

Formula One World Championship career
- First entry: 1975 Argentine Grand Prix
- Races entered: 120 (103 starts)
- Engines: Ford
- Constructors' Championships: 0
- Drivers' Championships: 0
- Race victories: 0
- Podiums: 3
- Points: 44
- Pole positions: 0
- Fastest laps: 0
- Final entry: 1982 Caesars Palace Grand Prix

Fittipaldi Automotive was a Formula One racing team and constructor that competed from 1975 to 1982. The cars were officially called Copersucar until the end of 1979 and Fittipaldi from the beginning of 1980 onwards. It was the only Formula One team to have been based in Brazil. The team was formed during 1974 by racing driver Wilson Fittipaldi and his younger brother, double world champion Emerson, with money from the Brazilian sugar and alcohol cooperative Copersucar. The team raced under a Brazilian licence. Emerson Fittipaldi became a driver for the team in 1976 after leaving McLaren, but was unable to replicate his earlier success with the family-owned team. Future world champion Keke Rosberg took his first podium finish in Formula One with the team.

The team was originally based in the Fittipaldis' hometown of São Paulo, almost 6,000 miles (10,000 km) away from the centre of the world motor racing industry in the UK, before moving to Reading, UK during 1977. It participated in 119 Grands Prix between 1975 and 1982, entering a total of 156 cars. It achieved three podiums and scored 44 championship points.

== Origins ==
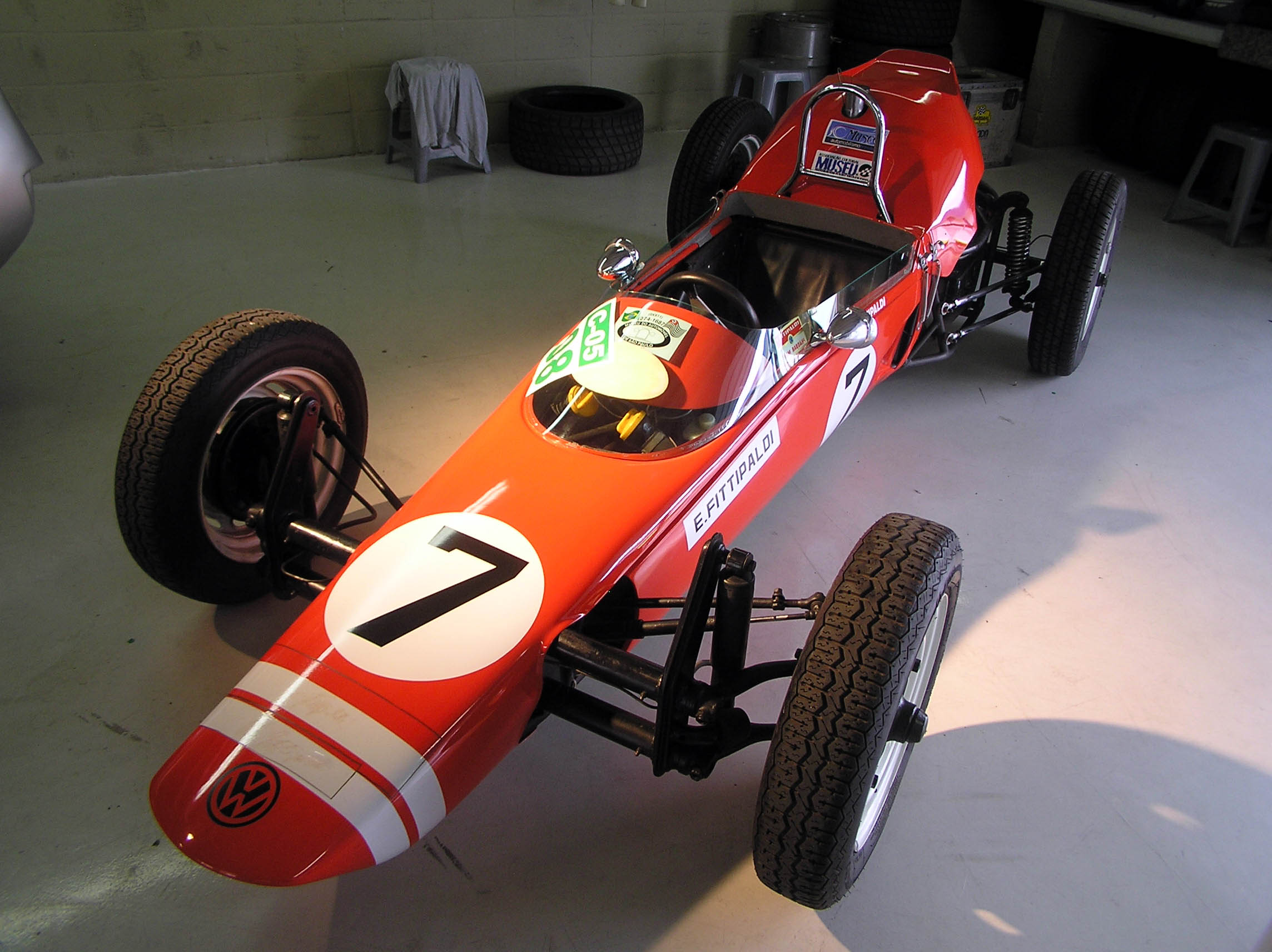
Fitti-Vee: The Fittipaldis built their first racing cars in Brazil for Formula Vee in 1967

In the 1960s the young Fittipaldi brothers, Wilson and Emerson, ran a successful business in their native Brazil building karts and tuning engines. They went on to build customer Formula Vee racing cars and various successful one-off sports cars, including a twin-engined, fibreglass-bodied Volkswagen Beetle, as well as maintaining a car and racing accessories business. They were also race-winning drivers in Brazil and in the late 1960s went to Europe, where they progressed through the junior ranks to reach Formula One, the highest international single seater racing category. The younger brother, Emerson, was the more successful; by 1970 he was driving for the Lotus team in Formula One and won his first world championship in 1972. Wilson drove for the Brabham team in Formula One in 1972 and 1973, scoring a best race finish of fifth place. In late 1973 the brothers decided to start their own Formula One team.

The 1974 season was spent setting up the new team, which was to have a strong Brazilian flavour. Wilson was able to persuade Brazilian sugar and alcohol cooperative Copersucar to sponsor the team. McLaren driver Emerson acted as a consultant to the team. The Copersucar-branded car was designed by Brazilian Richard Divila, who had worked for Fittipaldi Empreendimentos designing Formula Vee cars, and later for the European Formula Two Team Bardahl Fittipaldi, modifying their Lotus and Brabham chassis. National aerospace company Embraer was also involved, supplying materials to the fledgling team and providing wind-tunnel time. Mexican Jo Ramírez was hired as team manager. The team was initially based in Brazil, almost 6,000 miles (10,000 km) away from the United Kingdom, a bold move given the overwhelmingly British nature of Formula One technology from the 1960s onwards. The long and low Copersucar FD01, with bulbous bodywork enclosing the engine and unusual rear-mounted radiators, painted in silver with rainbow markings on the flanks, was unveiled in October 1974 at the Federal Senate in Brasília in the presence of President Ernesto Geisel. Like Brabham's BT series of cars (Brabham and Tauranac), the car's FD designation reflected the initials of the driver and the designer (Fittipaldi and Divila).

== Racing history ==
=== Copersucar-Fittipaldi (1975–1977) ===
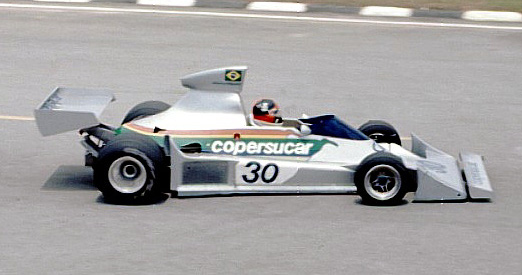
Copersucar-Fittipaldi FD04: Emerson qualified 5th on his debut for the family team in 1976. This was the last Fittipaldi to be built in Brazil.

The team, initially known as Copersucar-Fittipaldi, did not have great success in its first racing season in 1975. Wilson crashed in chassis FD01 on lap 13 of their first race, the Argentine Grand Prix, which his brother went on to win in his McLaren. Chassis numbers FD02 and FD03, used for the rest of the year, were the same design as the original car but abandoned most of the original bodywork. Wilson was the sole driver and managed only five finishes, the highest of which was a 10th and last place at the US Grand Prix at Watkins Glen (his last race in Formula One), and failed to qualify on three occasions. Italian Arturo Merzario did no better when he took over the chassis for his home Grand Prix after Wilson broke two bones in his hand in a practice crash at the Austrian Grand Prix. Despite the lack of success, the tiny team achieved a coup for the following year: Emerson Fittipaldi joined the team from McLaren, with whom he had taken his second Driver's Championship in 1974. His brother stepped down from driving to look after the management of the team.

Emerson commented: "I am aware that I will virtually have no chance of winning the world title next season....It will be a very difficult beginning, but I am very enthusiastic and I am certain that with everybody's effort we will have the first positive results in the second half of next year. I think that in the medium term of one or two years Brazil will have one of the best Formula One teams in the world."

Emerson was the team's main driver in 1976 although Brazilian Ingo Hoffmann joined him for four races. Fittipaldi qualified the new FD04 fifth for his debut, at Interlagos. In the race, although, he could only finish 13th due to engine problems – a result which was more representative of the rest of the season during which he scored only three points. The qualifying result remained the best the team would ever achieve. The experiment of basing the team in Brazil did not last – it was too far from their engine and gearbox suppliers and did not have the large community of expert component manufacturers available in the UK. Although the first FD04 was built there, future cars would be built at the team's established base in Reading, UK, in what would become known as 'motorsport valley'.

The team continued with the same setup for 1977. Fittipaldi was able to score several 4th and 5th places during the year. Hoffman only appeared twice at the beginning of the year, finishing 7th at the Brazilian Grand Prix. The new F5, liveried in yellow rather than silver, (Divila having left the role of technical director, the 'D' was dropped from the designation) was introduced mid-season. It was described as a carbon copy of the Ensign N177, the only difference being that the Fittipaldi had two split radiators on each side.

=== Fittipaldi Automotive (1978–1979) ===
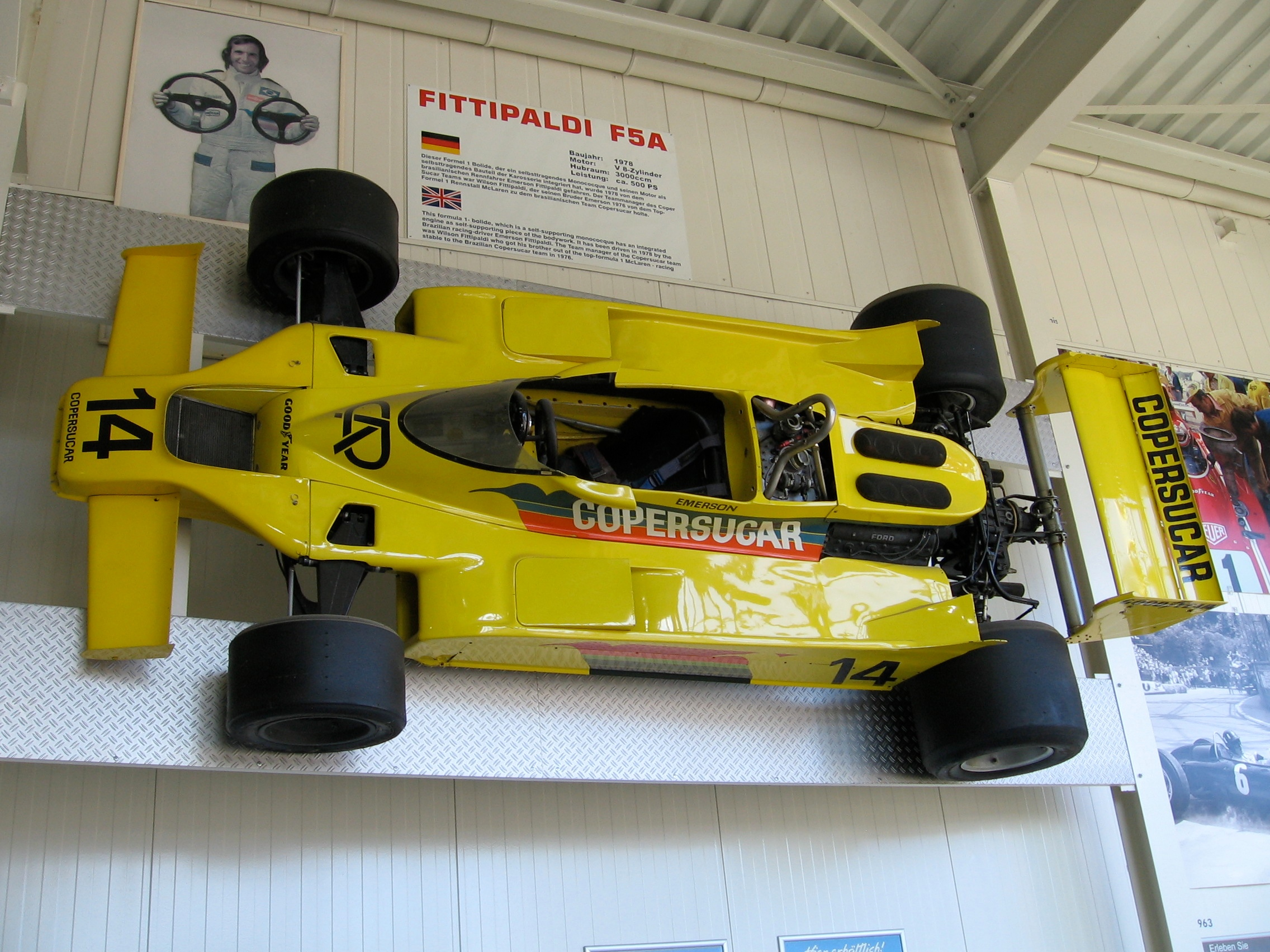
Fittipaldi F5A: The aerodynamics modified version of the F5 was designed by Giacomo Caliri.

While it was not a great success in 1977, in 1978 the F5A, modified to implement the principles of ground effect demonstrated to excellent effect by Lotus, allowed the former World Champion to score several good results. The best of these was a competitive second place, after fighting with Mario Andretti and Gilles Villeneuve, at the team's perennial happy hunting ground in Brazil. Fittipaldi finished the year with 17 points and the team, now known as Fittipaldi Automotive, came 7th in the Constructor's table – one place ahead of Emerson's old team McLaren.

The 1979 season saw the promise of the previous year fade away. Implementing ground effect successfully was becoming crucial to success on the track but understanding of the phenomenon was in its infancy and Ralph Bellamy's F6 was a failure on the track. Fittipaldi was again the team's only driver, although Alex Ribeiro was run in the non-championship race which inaugurated the Imola circuit that year, before attempting and failing to qualify a car for the end of season North American championship races.

=== Skol Fittipaldi Team (1980) ===
At the end of 1979 Copersucar decided to end their sponsorship. The team bought the remains of close neighbour Wolf Racing, becoming a two car operation for the first time. The team was renamed Skol Team Fittipaldi for the 1980 season to reflect new sponsorship from Skol Brasil (now an AmBev brand). Emerson and Wolf Racing driver Keke Rosberg raced the first part of the season with reworked Wolf chassis from the previous year. The cars, designated F7s, brought a third place for each of the drivers before being replaced by the less successful F8. The design team that year was headed by Harvey Postlethwaite, another asset gained from Wolf, and also included very young chief aerodynamicist Adrian Newey – both were later designers of championship winning cars for other teams.

=== Fittipaldi Automotive (1981–1982) ===
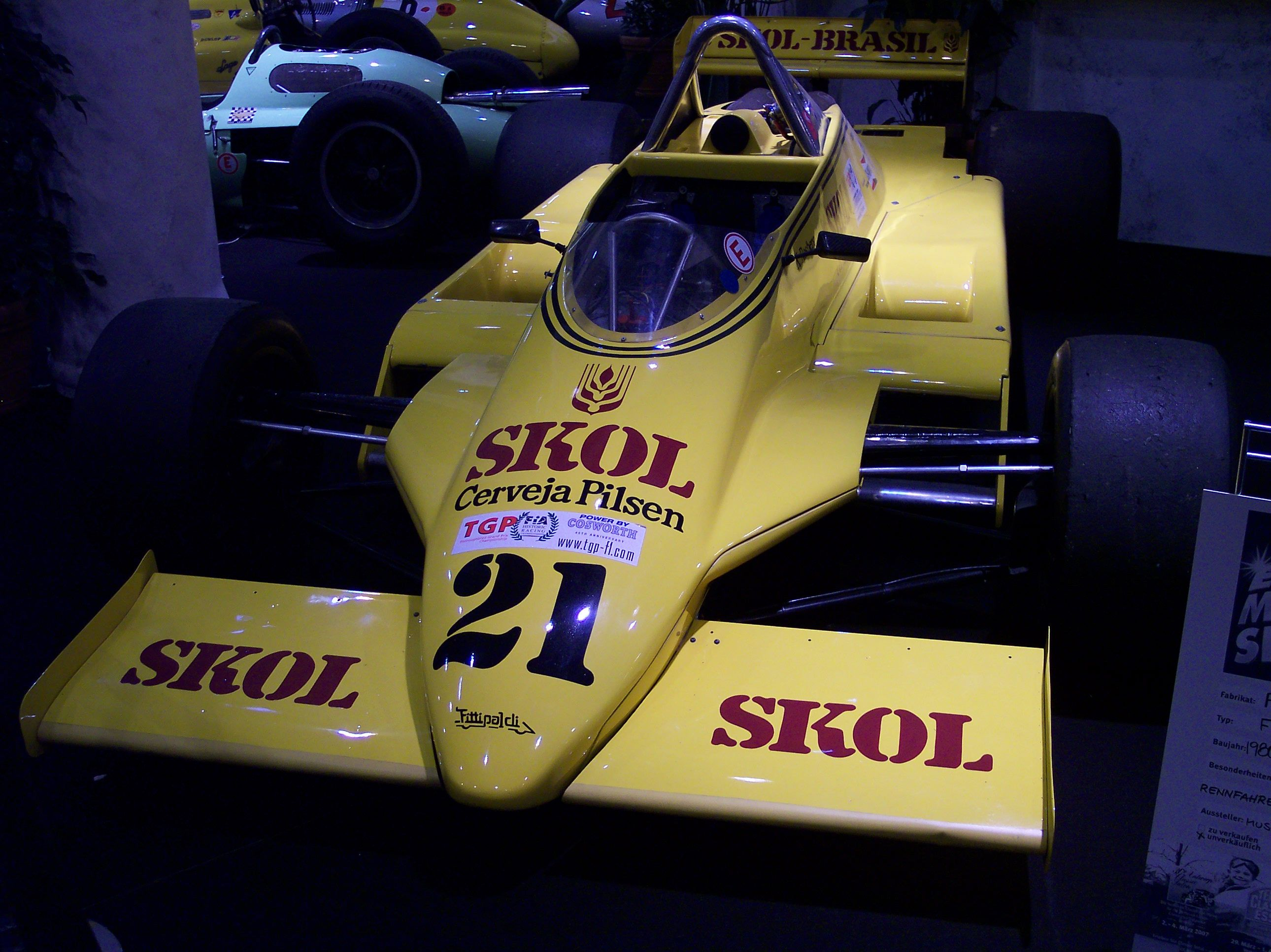
Fittipaldi F8: The car was designed by Harvey Postlethwaite and Adrian Newey.

Emerson Fittipaldi decided to retire from racing at the end of 1980. He has since said that his last two years in Formula One were very unhappy: "I was too involved in the problems of trying to make the team work, and I neglected my marriage and my personal life", although at the time he cited colleagues' deaths (like those of Ronnie Peterson and Patrick Depailler) as his reason. He was only 33, but had been racing in Formula One for a decade. He had failed to finish seven of the last ten races that year and had several times been outpaced by his Finnish team-mate. He moved into the management of the team and young Brazilian Chico Serra replaced him for 1981. The team, which reverted to the name of Fittipaldi Automotive as Skol sponsorship was lost again, entered a sharp decline from 1981 onwards. Postlethwaite left for Ferrari early in the year and the team once again raced updated variants of the previous season's chassis, using tyres from Michelin, Avon and Pirelli – including one race in which the two cars were on different brands. Rosberg did manage to finish a fourth at the non-championship FOCA South African Grand Prix at the start of the year, albeit one lap down on the leaders (see FISA–FOCA war), but after that the drivers recorded a succession of DNQs and retirements. When they did finish they were normally at the back of the field and scored no points that year. During that season, Peter Warr was convinced by his old boss Colin Chapman to return to Lotus.

The Finn moved to Williams for 1982, where he would win the Drivers Championship. The team continued with a single F8 for Serra – often using a chassis that had raced through most of the 1981 season – and scored a final point from a sixth-place finish at the Belgian Grand Prix at Zolder, although only after Niki Lauda had been disqualified. A final new car, the F9, was penned by the returning Divila and Tim Wright and introduced at the British Grand Prix that year, but failed to improve matters. The Fittipaldi brothers attempted to raise funds to continue in 1983, but the team closed its doors early in 1983.

== Aurora Formula One ==
A Fittipaldi F5A chassis run by RAM Racing (in the guise of 'Mopar Ultramar Racing Team') took the make's only race win in the Aurora Formula One championship at the Race of Champions at Brands Hatch on 15 April 1979 in the hands of Guy Edwards, albeit actually 7th on the road behind six cars from the world championship which were not entered in the Aurora series. Edwards and team-mate Bernard de Dryver scored other good results in the series, including a string of podium finishes.

Valentino Musetti, a British stuntman, raced an updated F5B variant in the 1980 Aurora Formula One UK championship, but with less success than the previous year.

== Drivers ==
For much of its history Fittipaldi Automotive was entirely focussed around Emerson Fittipaldi. Emerson was a double world champion renowned for a smooth and quick style when he joined the family team. Although his older brother drove in the team's first season, the suggestion that Emerson might drive for the team was always in the air and only a year later he cancelled contract discussions with his then team McLaren at a very late stage and signed with Fittipaldi. Although he remained capable of front-running performances, during his time with Fittipaldi Automotive he became an inconsistent performer. On several occasions team manager Jo Ramírez berated his driver after a sudden burst of speed indicated that he had not been driving to his full potential. By 1980 Fittipaldi's teammate Keke Rosberg thought him long past his best, and found him demotivated. Emerson retired at the end of that year after five full seasons with the family team, but returned to racing in the CART series in 1984. He won the series championship in 1989, and the Indianapolis 500 in both 1989 and 1993. Emerson's CART career came to an end in 1996, after he suffered serious injuries at the Michigan 500.

The young Finn Keke Rosberg was struggling to get into a competitive seat when he joined Fittipaldi for the 1980 season. He had previously driven two disjointed seasons for the Theodore Racing, ATS and Walter Wolf Racing teams but although he had won a non-championship race with Theodore, he had scored no world championship points. Fittipaldi bought the remains of Wolf at the end of 1979. Rosberg reports that Emerson, who had not previously had a full-time teammate while at Fittipaldi Automotive, wanted another Brazilian driver but was persuaded by ex-Wolf employees Peter Warr and Harvey Postlethwaite to offer the number two drive to the Finn. Rosberg himself saw a full season in Formula One with Fittipaldi as a step "towards victory". He was competitive alongside Emerson during his first season, scoring a podium in his first race with the team, the 1980 Argentine Grand Prix. Rosberg passed Emerson on the track in his second race for the team, and claims that from then on there was friction between Fittipaldi and himself. During his disastrous second season with the team, during which not a single point was scored, Rosberg engineered his release from his contract. He went to Williams, where he would win the drivers world championship the next season.

Other notable Fittipaldi drivers included Wilson Fittipaldi, who drove the lone Fittipaldi car during its maiden season and the future 12-time Brazilian Stock Car champion Ingo Hoffmann, who drove a handful of races as the second entry for the team.

== Complete Formula One results ==
(key)

Year	Chassis	Engines	Drivers	1	2	3	4	5	6	7	8	9	10	11	12	13	14	15	16	17	Points	WCC
1975	FD01; FD02; FD03	Ford Cosworth DFV 3.0 V8		ARG	BRA	RSA	ESP	MON	BEL	SWE	NED	FRA	GBR	GER	AUT	ITA	USA				0	NC
1975	FD01; FD02; FD03	Ford Cosworth DFV 3.0 V8	(Brazil) Wilson Fittipaldi	Ret	13	DNQ	Ret	DNQ	12	17	11	Ret	19	Ret	DNS		10				0	NC
1975	FD01; FD02; FD03	Ford Cosworth DFV 3.0 V8	(Italy) Arturo Merzario													11					0	NC
1976	FD03; FD04	Ford Cosworth DFV 3.0 V8		BRA	RSA	USW	ESP	BEL	MON	SWE	FRA	GBR	GER	AUT	NED	ITA	CAN	USA	JPN		3	11th
1976	FD03; FD04	Ford Cosworth DFV 3.0 V8	(Brazil) Emerson Fittipaldi	13	17	6	Ret	DNQ	6	Ret	Ret	6	13	Ret	Ret	15	Ret	9	Ret		3	11th
1976	FD03; FD04	Ford Cosworth DFV 3.0 V8	(Brazil) Ingo Hoffmann	11		DNQ	DNQ				DNQ										3	11th
1977	FD04; F5	Ford Cosworth DFV 3.0 V8		ARG	BRA	RSA	USW	ESP	MON	BEL	SWE	FRA	GBR	GER	AUT	NED	ITA	USA	CAN	JPN	11	9th
1977	FD04; F5	Ford Cosworth DFV 3.0 V8	(Brazil) Emerson Fittipaldi	4	4	10	5	14	Ret	Ret	18	11	Ret	DNQ	11	4	DNQ	13	Ret		11	9th
1977	FD04; F5	Ford Cosworth DFV 3.0 V8	(Brazil) Ingo Hoffmann	Ret	7																11	9th
1978	F5A	Ford Cosworth DFV 3.0 V8		ARG	BRA	RSA	USW	MON	BEL	ESP	SWE	FRA	GBR	GER	AUT	NED	ITA	USA	CAN		17	7th
1978	F5A	Ford Cosworth DFV 3.0 V8	(Brazil) Emerson Fittipaldi	9	2	Ret	8	9	Ret	Ret	6	Ret	Ret	4	4	5	8	5	Ret		17	7th
1979	F5A; F6A	Ford Cosworth DFV 3.0 V8		ARG	BRA	RSA	USW	ESP	BEL	MON	FRA	GBR	GER	AUT	NED	ITA	CAN	USA			1	12th
1979	F5A; F6A	Ford Cosworth DFV 3.0 V8	(Brazil) Emerson Fittipaldi	6	11	13	Ret	11	9	Ret	Ret	Ret	Ret	Ret	Ret	8	8	7			1	12th
1979	F5A; F6A	Ford Cosworth DFV 3.0 V8	(Brazil) Alex Ribeiro														DNQ	DNQ			1	12th
1980	F7; F8	Ford Cosworth DFV 3.0 V8		ARG	BRA	RSA	USW	BEL	MON	FRA	GBR	GER	AUT	NED	ITA	CAN	USA				11	8th
1980	F7; F8	Ford Cosworth DFV 3.0 V8	(Brazil) Emerson Fittipaldi	NC	15	8	3	Ret	6	Ret	12	Ret	11	Ret	Ret	Ret	Ret				11	8th
1980	F7; F8	Ford Cosworth DFV 3.0 V8	(Finland) Keke Rosberg	3	9	Ret	Ret	7	DNQ	Ret	DNQ	Ret	16	DNQ	5	9	10				11	8th
1981	F8C	Ford Cosworth DFV 3.0 V8		USW	BRA	ARG	SMR	BEL	MON	ESP	FRA	GBR	GER	AUT	NED	ITA	CAN	CPL			0	NC
1981	F8C	Ford Cosworth DFV 3.0 V8	(Finland) Keke Rosberg	Ret	9	Ret	Ret	Ret	DNQ	12	Ret	Ret	DNQ		DNQ	DNQ	DNQ	10			0	NC
1981	F8C	Ford Cosworth DFV 3.0 V8	(Brazil) Chico Serra	7	Ret	Ret	DNQ	Ret	DNQ	11	DNS	DNQ	DNQ		DNQ	DNQ	DNQ	DNQ			0	NC
1982	F8D; F9	Ford Cosworth DFV 3.0 V8		RSA	BRA	USW	SMR	BEL	MON	DET	CAN	NED	GBR	FRA	GER	AUT	SUI	ITA	CPL		1	14th
1982	F8D; F9	Ford Cosworth DFV 3.0 V8	(Brazil) Chico Serra	17	Ret	DNQ		6	DNPQ	11	DNQ	Ret	Ret	DNQ	11	7	DNQ	11	DNQ		1	14th

=== Non-championship results ===
Year	Event	Venue	Driver	Result	Notes
1975	BRDC International Trophy	Silverstone	Wilson Fittipaldi	Ret	The International Trophy was a regular fixture from the 1950s to the 1970s
1978	BRDC International Trophy	Silverstone	Emerson Fittipaldi	2	The International Trophy was a regular fixture from the 1950s to the 1970s
1979	Dino Ferrari Grand Prix	Imola	Alex Ribeiro	Ret	Non-championship race held to inaugurate the Autodromo Dino Ferrari
1980	Spanish Grand Prix	Jarama	Emerson Fittipaldi	5	This race was not attended by the 'FISA' teams (see FISA–FOCA war) and was later declared not to have formed part of the championship.
1980	Spanish Grand Prix	Jarama	Keke Rosberg	Ret	This race was not attended by the 'FISA' teams (see FISA–FOCA war) and was later declared not to have formed part of the championship.
1981	South African Grand Prix	Kyalami	Keke Rosberg	4	Another victim of the FISA–FOCA war
1981	South African Grand Prix	Kyalami	Chico Serra	9	Another victim of the FISA–FOCA war
