= Peter Warr =

British motorsport executive (1938–2010)

- Warr at the 1973 Italian Grand Prix
- Born: Peter Eric Warr; 18 June 1938; Kermanshah, Imperial State of Iran
- Died: 4 October 2010 (aged 72); Sainte-Foy-la-Grande, Gironde, France
- Education: Royal Military Academy Sandhurst
- Occupations: Motorsport executive; racing driver
- Employers: Formula One; Lotus (1970–1976); Wolf (1977–1979); Fittipaldi (1980–1981); Lotus (1981–1989)
- Title: Team Principal; Sporting Director

Peter Eric Warr (18 June 1938 – 4 October 2010) was a British motorsport executive and racing driver. From 1970 to 1976 and from 1981 to 1989, Warr served as team principal and sporting director for Lotus in Formula One, winning three World Constructors' Championship titles between 1970 and 1973; he also served in executive roles at Wolf and Fittipaldi. As a driver, Warr won the inaugural Japanese Grand Prix in 1963 with Lotus.

== Early life and career ==
Peter Eric Warr was born on 18 June 1938 in Kermanshah, Imperial State of Iran. Warr served a period of National Service as an officer in the Guards Division of the British Army, after training at the Royal Military Academy Sandhurst. Following demobilisation he moved into business. Warr joined Lotus Cars in 1958 as a salesman, soon switching to sister company Lotus Components where he handled sales of the company's customer racing cars, quickly rising to become Managing Director. During this period he also enjoyed a career as a racing driver, driving the same Lotus 18 Formula Junior cars that he sold during his day job. As a driver he did not reach Formula One, but he won a Formula Junior race in a Lotus 20 on the 4.8-mile south circuit at the Nurburgring on 28 April 1962, and is famous as the first winner of the Japanese Grand Prix in 1963, driving one of his employer's Lotus 23 sportscars.

== Motorsport management ==
Warr was selected by Colin Chapman in late 1969 to be Team Lotus' Competitions Manager in Formula One, and helped mastermind Jochen Rindt and Emerson Fittipaldi's World Championships in 1970 and 1972, respectively. At the end of 1976 Warr moved to the new team set up by Canadian oil magnate Walter Wolf, and oversaw a very successful first year in which Jody Scheckter won three races and challenged for the World Championship. Wolf's fortunes flagged and at the end of 1979 was merged with the Copersucar Fittipaldi team. By mid 1981 Chapman had enticed Warr back to Lotus, where he would remain until 1989.

Peter Warr (left) talking to Elio de Angelis at the 1983 Detroit Grand Prix

After Chapman's death, Warr took over the role of the team boss. After the very wet 1984 Monaco Grand Prix, in which Mansell crashed out of the lead, Warr famously stated that "he'll never win a Grand Prix as long as I have a hole in my arse". Mansell, however, went on to become one of the most successful British Formula One drivers of all time, with 31 race wins and becoming the only driver ever to hold F1 and CART titles at the same time. Later, at the end of the that same season, he hired a young Ayrton Senna (coming from Toleman) to partner Elio de Angelis against the wishes of John Player & Sons (JPS), the team's main sponsor, which wanted to keep Nigel Mansell.

As Lotus team manager, Warr signed Japanese giant Honda for use of their turbocharged engines in 1987 to replace the turbo Renault engines the team had been using since 1983 after the French manufacturer pulled out of F1 at the end of 1986. As part of the deal to get the Honda engines, which at the time were the best in Formula One, Lotus agreed to sign Honda test driver Satoru Nakajima as Ayrton Senna's teammate. Also gone from the cars was the famous Black and Gold of sponsors JPS, replaced by the Yellow and Blue of Camel cigarettes.

After a poor start to the 1989 season, Warr was asked to stand down as Lotus boss and was replaced by Rupert Mainwaring and Peter Collins. The change in Lotus team management took place before the ninth round in Germany.

Warr died suddenly of a heart attack on 4 October 2010, in Sainte-Foy-la-Grande, France. The sport's commercial rights holder and former Brabham team principal, Bernie Ecclestone, paid tribute to Warr's importance to Formula One, saying that "he helped me to build it to what it is today".

Warr's book My view from the pit wall was unfinished when he died. Journalist Simon Taylor added a prologue and commentary and it was published by Haynes Publishing in 2012.
