= 1975 Argentine Grand Prix =

Race details
- Date: January 12, 1975
- Official name: XII Gran Premio de la Republica Argentina
- Location: Autódromo Municipal Ciudad de Buenos Aires; Buenos Aires, Argentina
- Course: Permanent racing facility
- Course length: 5.968 km (3.708 miles)
- Distance: 53 laps, 316.315 km (196.549 miles)
- Weather: Hot and sunny

Pole position
Driver	(France) Jean-Pierre Jarier (Note: Jean-Pierre Jarier set the fastest qualifying time, but did not start the race. Pole position was left vacant on the grid. Carlos Pace, in the second slot, was the first driver on the grid. Jarier is still considered to have held pole position.)	Shadow-Ford
- Time: 1:49.21

Fastest lap
Driver	(United Kingdom) James Hunt	Hesketh-Ford
- Time: 1:50.91 on lap 34

Podium
First	(Brazil) Emerson Fittipaldi	McLaren-Ford
Second	(United Kingdom) James Hunt	Hesketh-Ford
Third	(Argentina) Carlos Reutemann	Brabham-Ford

The 1975 Argentine Grand Prix was a Formula One motor race held at Buenos Aires on 12 January 1975. It was race 1 of 14 in both the 1975 World Championship of Drivers and the 1975 International Cup for Formula One Manufacturers. It was the twelfth Argentine Grand Prix and only the second to be held on the lengthened six kilometre version of the race track that runs out towards Curvon Salotto around the lake which lies to the north-east of the circuit.

The race was won for the second time by Brazilian driver Emerson Fittipaldi driving a McLaren M23. He took a six-second victory over James Hunt in his Hesketh 308. Carlos Reutemann scored his best result to that time on his home race finishing third in his Brabham BT44B.

== Race summary ==
The close season had been fairly quiet – Jochen Mass had replaced Denny Hulme at McLaren, John Watson had joined Surtees and Mike Wilds, Rolf Stommelen and Jacques Laffite were confirmed at BRM, Hill and Williams respectively.

March had announced their retirement, but then in a dramatic U-turn confirmed their entry for 1975 with Vittorio Brambilla and Lella Lombardi.

There were contractual wrangles with Ronnie Peterson, reportedly discontent at Lotus and it was uncertain up until the start of practice whether he would be driving for them or Shadow.

Jean-Pierre Jarier proved the Shadow's effectiveness, putting in the fastest ever lap of the circuit, averaging 122 mph to gain his first pole from Carlos Pace and Carlos Reutemann.

However it was all in vain. On the warm-up lap, his crown-wheel-and-pinion stripped, leaving him a non-starter. Local hero Reutemann gratefully accepted the lead from Pace. James Hunt driving the newest Hesketh with new rubber suspension climbed from the 6th row up to third place, duelling with Niki Lauda. Jochen Mass and Jody Scheckter tangled. Meanwhile, John Watson was stranded with a loose fuel-pipe and was disqualified after attempting trackside repairs.

Wilson Fittipaldi crashed on lap 13, his car of his own construction catching fire and requiring the fire engine to be deployed. By now, Hunt had passed Lauda and was catching the two Brabhams. Pace took the lead on lap 15, but spun on the very next lap. Reutemann having retaken the lead, was understeering badly and on lap 25 was passed by Hunt. There was a ferocious battle with Emerson Fittipaldi for the lead.

== Classification ==
=== Qualifying ===
Pos.	Driver	Constructor	Time/Gap
1	(France) Jean-Pierre Jarier	Shadow–Ford	1:49.21
2	(Brazil) Carlos Pace	Brabham–Ford	+0.43
3	(Argentina) Carlos Reutemann	Brabham–Ford	+0.59
4	(Austria) Niki Lauda	Ferrari	+0.75
5	(Brazil) Emerson Fittipaldi	McLaren–Ford	+0.81
6	(United Kingdom) James Hunt	Hesketh–Ford	+1.05
7	(Switzerland) Clay Regazzoni	Ferrari	+1.50
8	(France) Patrick Depailler	Tyrrell–Ford	+1.59
9	(South Africa) Jody Scheckter	Tyrrell–Ford	+1.61
10	(United States) Mario Andretti	Parnelli–Ford	+1.85
11	(Sweden) Ronnie Peterson	Lotus–Ford	+2.23
12	(Italy) Vittorio Brambilla	March–Ford	+2.56
13	(West Germany) Jochen Mass	McLaren–Ford	+2.61
14	(United Kingdom) Tom Pryce	Shadow–Ford	+2.71
15	(United Kingdom) John Watson	Surtees–Ford	+2.92
16	(United States) Mark Donohue	Penske–Ford	+3.15
17	(France) Jacques Laffite	Williams–Ford	+3.67
18	(Belgium) Jacky Ickx	Lotus–Ford	+3.69
19	(West Germany) Rolf Stommelen	Lola–Ford	+3.91
20	(Italy) Arturo Merzario	Williams–Ford	+4.22
21	(United Kingdom) Graham Hill	Lola–Ford	+4.79
22	(United Kingdom) Mike Wilds	BRM	+5.27
23	(Brazil) Wilson Fittipaldi	Fittipaldi–Ford	+11.01

=== Race ===
Pos	No	Driver	Constructor	Tyre	Laps	Time/Retired	Grid	Points
1	1	(Brazil) Emerson Fittipaldi	McLaren-Ford	G	53	1:39:26.29	5	9
2	24	(United Kingdom) James Hunt	Hesketh-Ford	G	53	+ 5.91	6	6
3	7	(Argentina) Carlos Reutemann	Brabham-Ford	G	53	+ 17.06	3	4
4	11	(Switzerland) Clay Regazzoni	Ferrari	G	53	+ 35.79	7	3
5	4	(France) Patrick Depailler	Tyrrell-Ford	G	53	+ 54.25	8	2
6	12	(Austria) Niki Lauda	Ferrari	G	53	+ 1:19.65	4	1
7	28	(United States) Mark Donohue	Penske-Ford	G	52	+ 1 lap	16	
8	6	(Belgium) Jacky Ickx	Lotus-Ford	G	52	+ 1 lap	18	
9	9	(Italy) Vittorio Brambilla	March-Ford	G	52	+ 1 lap	12	
10	22	(United Kingdom) Graham Hill	Lola-Ford	G	52	+ 1 lap	21	
11	3	(South Africa) Jody Scheckter	Tyrrell-Ford	G	52	+ 1 lap	9	
12	16	(United Kingdom) Tom Pryce	Shadow-Ford	G	51	Transmission	14	
13	23	(Germany) Rolf Stommelen	Lola-Ford	G	51	+ 2 laps	19	
14	2	(Germany) Jochen Mass	McLaren-Ford	G	50	+ 3 laps	13	
Ret	8	(Brazil) Carlos Pace	Brabham-Ford	G	46	Engine	2	
NC	20	(Italy) Arturo Merzario	Williams-Ford	G	44	+ 9 laps	20	
Ret	27	(United States) Mario Andretti	Parnelli-Ford	F	27	Transmission	10	
Ret	14	(United Kingdom) Mike Wilds	BRM	G	24	Engine	22	
Ret	5	(Sweden) Ronnie Peterson	Lotus-Ford	G	15	Engine	11	
Ret	21	(France) Jacques Laffite	Williams-Ford	G	15	Gearbox	17	
Ret	30	(Brazil) Wilson Fittipaldi	Fittipaldi-Ford	G	12	Accident	23	
DSQ	18	(United Kingdom) John Watson	Surtees-Ford	G	6	Disqualified	15	
DNS	17	(France) Jean-Pierre Jarier	Shadow-Ford	G	0	Transmission	1	
WD	29	(Argentina) Nestor García-Veiga	Berta-Ford	G		Withdrew		

- Jean-Pierre Jarier did not start of race. His place on the grid was left vacant.
- Nestor García-Veiga withdrew due to a crash in pre-race testing. His place on the grid was left vacant.

== Milestone ==
- This was the Formula One World Championship debut for Argentinian driver Nestor García-Veiga.
- This was the 100th Grand Prix start for McLaren. In those 100 races, McLaren had won 13 Grands Prix, achieved 47 podium finishes, 4 pole positions, 6 fastest laps and won 1 Driver's and 1 Constructor's World Championship.
- This race marked the Formula One World Championship debut for British constructor Frank Williams Racing Cars (as a constructor), Brazilian constructor Fittipaldi and Argentinian constructor Berta. Both Fittipaldi and Berta were the first constructors of their respective nations to participate in Formula One.
- This was the first pole position for American-British constructor Shadow. Shadow became the first American constructor to get a pole position.
- This was the first fastest lap set by a Hesketh.
- This was the last race for Firestone tyres, equipping the Parnelli team (piloted by Mario Andretti), who preferred to concentrate his efforts in the American open-wheel car racing (more exactly in the USAC) since then.

== Championship standings after the race ==
Drivers' Championship standings

Pos	Driver	Points
1	(Brazil) Emerson Fittipaldi	9
2	(United Kingdom) James Hunt	6
3	(Argentina) Carlos Reutemann	4
4	(Switzerland) Clay Regazzoni	3
5	(France) Patrick Depailler	2

Constructors' Championship standings

Pos	Constructor	Points
1	(United Kingdom) McLaren-Ford	9
2	(United Kingdom) Hesketh-Ford	6
3	(United Kingdom) Brabham-Ford	4
4	(Italy) Ferrari	3
5	(United Kingdom) Tyrrell-Ford	2

- Note: Only the top five positions are included for both sets of standings.

Previous race: 1974 United States Grand Prix	FIA Formula One World Championship; 1975 season	Next race: 1975 Brazilian Grand Prix
Previous race: 1974 Argentine Grand Prix	Argentine Grand Prix	Next race: 1977 Argentine Grand Prix
