= Jo Ramírez =

Mexican motorsport engineer and manager (born 1941)

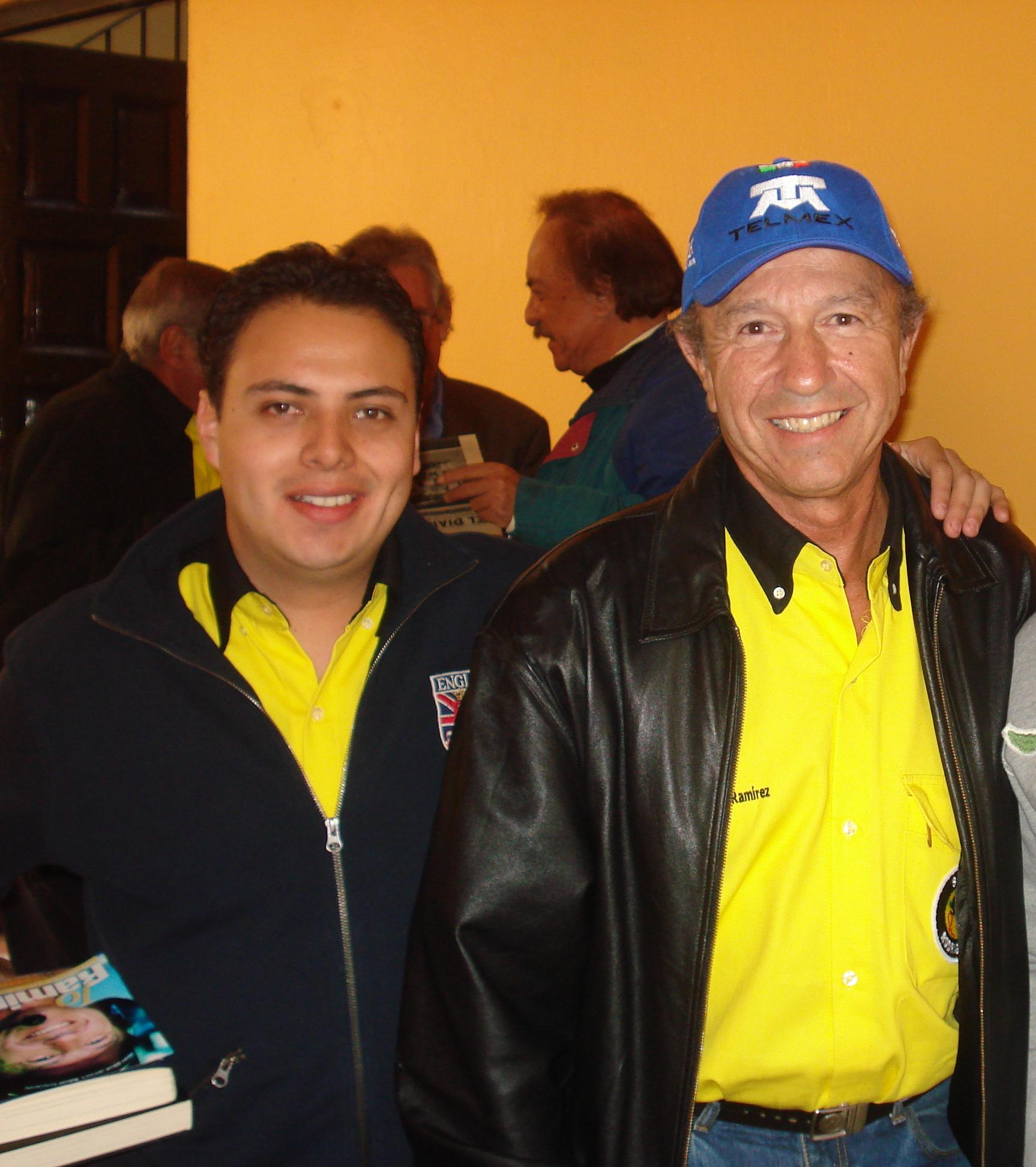
- Jo Ramírez (right)
- Born: Joaquín Ramírez Fernández; August 20, 1941 (age 84); Mexico City, Mexico
- Other names: Jo
- Education: UNAM
- Occupations: Formula One mechanic, author
- Known for: McLaren coordinator (1984–2001)
- Spouse: Bea Ramírez
- Children: 1

Joaquín Ramírez Fernández (born August 20, 1941) is a Mexican author and retired employee of several sports car racing teams. From 1984 to 2001, Ramírez was coordinator of the McLaren Formula One team, including during the infamous Prost–Senna rivalry of the late-1980s.

== Early life ==
The third of eight children, Ramírez was born in Mexico City and studied mechanical engineering at the National Autonomous University of Mexico (UNAM). Contrary to his father's desires he dropped out in 1960 to follow his friend Ricardo Rodríguez to Europe. Ramírez worked as apprentice mechanic for Scuderia Ferrari for two years. When Rodríguez died in a racing crash in the 1962 Mexican Grand Prix, Ramírez first took a job at Maserati and later at Lamborghini as a mechanic of their new line of high-performance road cars. In 1964, he moved to England where he worked for Ford on the GT40, before joining Dan Gurney's All American Racers team in 1966.

== Formula One career ==
During the 1960s and 1970s, Ramírez worked for several Formula One teams, including Dan Gurney's Eagle, Tyrrell, where founder Ken Tyrrell advised him to keep a diary of his time in the sport, and for Wilson and Emerson Fittipaldi in their Fittipaldi Copersucar team.

In December 1983, Ramírez joined the front-running McLaren Formula One operation as Team Coordinator, becoming close friends with many top drivers including Alain Prost, Ayrton Senna, David Coulthard, and Mika Häkkinen. In 2001, after more than 40 years, Ramírez retired from the Great Circus and was advised by McLaren team manager Ron Dennis not to write his life story as no one would be interested. Ramírez was left in little doubt that Dennis's true aim was to stop any undesirable details of the team's inner workings from becoming public. As a parting gift David Coulthard and Mika Häkkinen gave him a Harley-Davidson Road King at the 2001 Hungarian Grand Prix and his last race was the 2001 United States Grand Prix which was also Häkkinen's final race win in Formula One.

Statistics

- 479 Formula One Grands Prix in which he participated.
- 116 triumphs in Formula One Grands Prix.
- 10 Formula One Drivers' World Championships: 1973, 1984, 1985, 1986, 1988, 1989, 1990, 1991, 1998, and 1999.
- 5 Formula One World Champions: Jackie Stewart (1), Niki Lauda (1), Alain Prost (3), Ayrton Senna (3), and Mika Häkkinen (2).
- 7 Formula One Constructors' World Championships (McLaren): 1984, 1985, 1988, 1989, 1990, 1991, and 1998.
- 8 Formula One teams: Ferrari, AAR Eagle, Tyrrell, Fittipaldi-Copersucar, Shadow, ATS, Theodore, and McLaren.
- 1 World Sportscar Championship (JW-Porsche): 1971.
- 1 World Sportscar Drivers' Championship: Pedro Rodríguez and Jackie Oliver.
- 4 teams and prototype sports car: Ferrari, Maserati, Ford, and JW-Porsche.

== After Formula One ==
In 2005, Ramírez published his life story: Jo Ramirez: Memoirs of a racing man. Ramírez, who is fluent in Spanish, English, Italian, and Portuguese, has also written the foreword of some books like Los Hermanos Rodríguez (2006), The Brothers Rodríguez (2009), and La Carrera Panamericana: "The World's Greatest Road Race!" (2008).

During Formula One seasons, Ramírez has a column in the Mexican newspaper Reforma. Ramírez was also a great supporter and inspiration to Mexican talents like Adrián Fernández, Salvador Durán, Sergio Pérez, and Esteban Gutiérrez. He is a member of the Scuderia Rodríguez, Mexico's racing Legion of Honor, and was named to its Hall of Fame of Mexican Motorsport.

== Carrera Panamericana ==
After his retirement from Formula One, Ramírez has participated in the Carrera Panamericana, including the fourth place in the A+ Historic category in 2010 in a Volvo. In the 2012 edition, Ramírez and his co-driver Alberto "Beto" Cruz got the podium with a third place in the category of A+ Historic 2,000 cc. Ramírez drove his Volvo P-1800 of Escuderia Telmex and concludes on the 50th overall with a time of 5h.55m.3.1s.
