= Wilson Fittipaldi Júnior =

Brazilian racing driver (1943–2024)

Wilson Fittipaldi Jr.
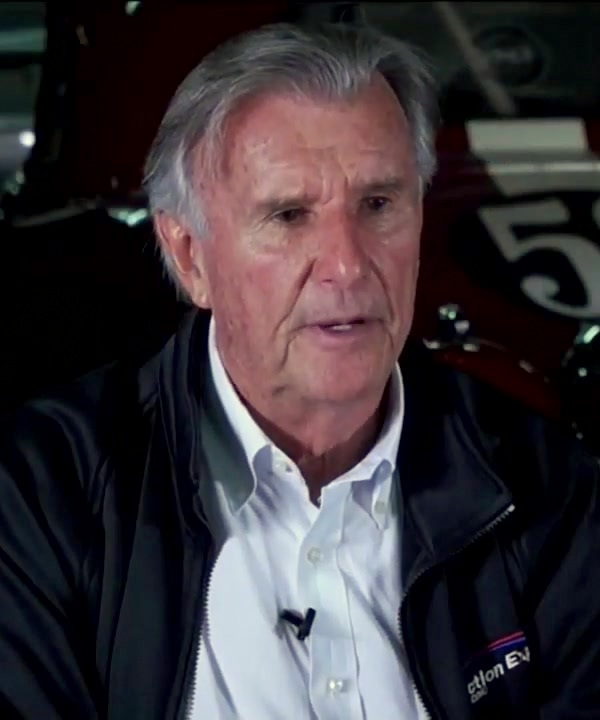
- Fittipaldi in 2017
- Born: 25 December 1943; São Paulo, Brazil
- Died: 23 February 2024 (aged 80); São Paulo, Brazil
- Relatives: Emerson Fittipaldi (brother); Christian Fittipaldi (son); Emerson Fittipaldi Jr. (nephew); Pietro Fittipaldi (grandnephew); Enzo Fittipaldi (grandnephew); Max Papis (nephew-in-law)

Formula One World Championship career
- Active years: 1972–1973, 1975
- Team(s): Brabham, Copersucar-Fittipaldi
- Entries: 38 (35 starts)
- Championships: 0
- Wins: 0
- Podiums: 0
- Career points: 3
- Pole positions: 0
- Fastest laps: 0
- First entry: 1972 Spanish Grand Prix
- Last entry: 1975 United States Grand Prix

Wilson Fittipaldi Júnior (25 December 1943 – 23 February 2024) was a Brazilian racing driver and Formula One team owner. He participated in 38 World Championship Formula One Grands Prix, debuting on 1 May 1972, scoring a total of three championship points. He ran the Fittipaldi Formula One team between 1974 and 1982. He also participated in numerous non-Championship Formula One races.

== Personal life ==
Born on Christmas Day 1943, Wilson Fittipaldi Jr was the elder son of prominent motorsports journalist and radio commentator Wilson Sr (of Italian origin) and his wife Juzy (of Russian origin), who both raced production cars shortly after the Second World War. Wilson Sr was also responsible for the first Mil Milhas race in 1956, in São Paulo, having been inspired by the 1949 Italian Mille Miglia. Wilson Jr is often referred to as 'Wilsinho' ("Little Wilson", cf. Rubens Barrichello's occasional nickname of Rubinho or footballer Ronaldinho) or 'Tigrão'. He unsurprisingly became a keen motorsports enthusiast from an early age.

Fittipaldi was the older brother of CART champion and double Formula One world champion Emerson Fittipaldi. Like Jimmy Stewart and Ian Scheckter he remained in the shadow of his younger and more illustrious sibling in top-level motorsport. He married Suzy. He was the father of former CART, Formula One and NASCAR driver Christian Fittipaldi and has a daughter, Roberta.

Fittipaldi suffered a cardiac arrest on 25 December 2023, his 80th birthday. According to his wife, during dinner he choked on a piece of food and the resulting lack of oxygen resulted in the cardiac arrest. He was resuscitated and subsequently admitted to a hospital where he was sedated and intubated. He died in São Paulo on 23 February 2024.

== Racing career ==
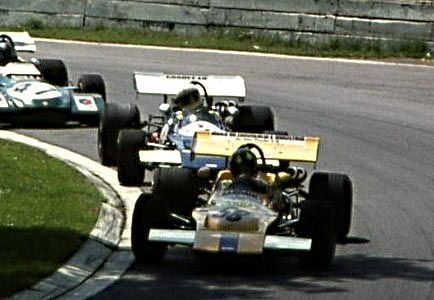
Wilson Fittipaldi in a March competing in F2 in 1971 at Crystal Palace.

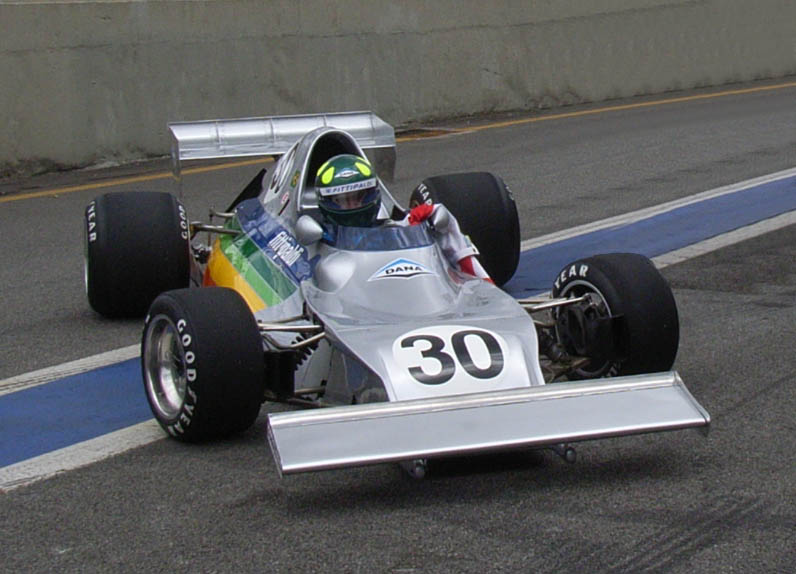
Wilson Fittipaldi in Copersucar-Fittipaldi's radical first car, restored in 2004 after being destroyed on its debut in 1975.

Fittipaldi started racing the karts that he and his brother built in Brazil in the 1960s, before moving on to Formula Vee.

Fittipaldi made a brief trip to Europe in 1966 to race in Formula Three, but the opportunity fell through due to conflicts with the team he drove for in Brazil. He did not return to England until 1970, following his brother's success in Formula Two. That year he raced a Jim Russell Driving School entered Lotus 59 in British Formula Three, beating Carlos Pace and works Lotus driver Dave Walker, among others, to a victory at a BARC Championship round at Silverstone. At various times during the year he was also competing with future Formula One champions Niki Lauda and James Hunt. Combined with some other good results, particularly in the latter part of the year, including wins in two non-championship rounds, this enabled him to move up to the European Formula Two championship for 1971.

Here, Fittipaldi scored several more good results racing alongside his brother for Team Bardahl-Fittipaldi in Lotus and March chassis, including a podium at Hockenheim and fourth places at Rouen and Mantorp Park. These results were sufficient to gain him a deal with the Brabham Formula One team for the 1972 season as a pay driver.

Fittipaldi's Formula One career started with a podium at the 1972 Brazilian Grand Prix; however, this was a non-championship race and he was unable to repeat the performance in the world championship. He was a moderately competitive midfield runner for Brabham in 1972 and 1973. He scored no points in the 1972 championship, but in 1973 he scored his only Formula One World Championship points with a sixth place in Buenos Aires and a fifth place at the Nürburgring. His best qualifying results were ninth in Monaco and tenth at Mosport also in 1973.

Fittipaldi, tired of both being a paying driver and being a second driver on the team, without being able to challenge the team's first driver Carlos Reutemann under the boss's orders Bernie Ecclestone, took a break from driving at the beginning of 1974 to set up a Brazilian Formula One team (although he took part in the Grande Premio Presidente Emilio Medici non-championship Formula One race that year with Brabham). The team, initially known as Copersucar-Fittipaldi, did not have great success in their first racing season in 1975. Wilson was the sole driver and managed only six finishes, the highest of which was 10th, and last, place at the US Grand Prix at Watkins Glen, and failed to qualify several times. Wilson stepped down from driving to look after the management of the team in 1976 when his brother, Emerson, joined the team from McLaren. His career total of three points, scored in 1972 and 1973 with Brabham, made him the most successful sibling of a Formula One World Champion until the arrival of Ralf Schumacher in 1997.

Fittipaldi occasionally returned to competitive driving. In the 1980s and early 1990s, he drove in the Brazilian Stock Car championship, winning several rounds. In 1994 and 1995, he was victorious for Porsche in the classic Mil Milhas race founded by his father, on the former occasion sharing the car with his son Christian. In February 1998, he announced his return to competitive driving in the Brazilian Stock Car championship. In 2000, he was a guest driver for Mercedes-Benz at the Nürburgring round of the FIA European Truck Racing Cup, finishing eighth and 11th. In 2008, Wilson and Emerson entered the Brazilian GT3 Championship, driving a Porsche 997 GT3 for the WB Motorsports team.

=== Complete Formula One World Championship results ===
(key) (Races in bold indicate pole position)

Year	Entrant	Chassis	Engine	1	2	3	4	5	6	7	8	9	10	11	12	13	14	15	WDC	Pts.
1972	Motor Racing Developments	Brabham BT33	Ford Cosworth DFV V8	ARG	RSA	ESP; 7	MON; 9												NC	0
1972	Motor Racing Developments	Brabham BT34	Ford Cosworth DFV V8					BEL; Ret	FRA; 8	GBR; 12	GER; 7	AUT; Ret	ITA; Ret	CAN; Ret	USA; Ret				NC	0
1973	Motor Racing Developments	Brabham BT37	Ford Cosworth DFV V8	ARG; 6	BRA; Ret	RSA; Ret													15th	3
1973	Motor Racing Developments	Brabham BT42	Ford Cosworth DFV V8				ESP; 10	BEL; Ret	MON; 11	SWE; Ret	FRA; 16	GBR; Ret	NED; Ret	GER; 5	AUT; Ret	ITA; Ret	CAN; 11	USA; NC	15th	3
1975	Copersucar	Fittipaldi FD01	Ford Cosworth DFV V8	ARG; Ret															NC	0
1975	Copersucar	Fittipaldi FD02	Ford Cosworth DFV V8		BRA; 13	RSA; DNQ	ESP; Ret	MON; DNQ	BEL; 12	SWE; 17									NC	0
1975	Copersucar	Fittipaldi FD03	Ford Cosworth DFV V8								NED; 11	FRA; Ret	GBR; 19	GER; Ret	AUT; DNS	ITA	USA; 10		NC	0

=== Complete Non-Championship Formula One results ===
(key) (Races in bold indicate pole position)

Year	Entrant	Chassis	Engine	1	2	3	4	5	6	7	8
1971	Gold Leaf Team Lotus	Lotus 49C	Ford Cosworth DFV V8	ARG; Ret	ROC	QUE	SPR	INT	RIN	OUL	VIC
1972	Motor Racing Developments	Brabham BT33	Ford Cosworth DFV V8	ROC	BRA; 3	INT	OUL	REP	VIC		
1974	Motor Racing Developments	Brabham BT44	Ford Cosworth DFV V8	PRE; 5	ROC	INT					
1975	Copersucar	Fittipaldi FD02	Ford Cosworth DFV V8	ROC	INT; Ret	SUI					

=== Formula One records ===
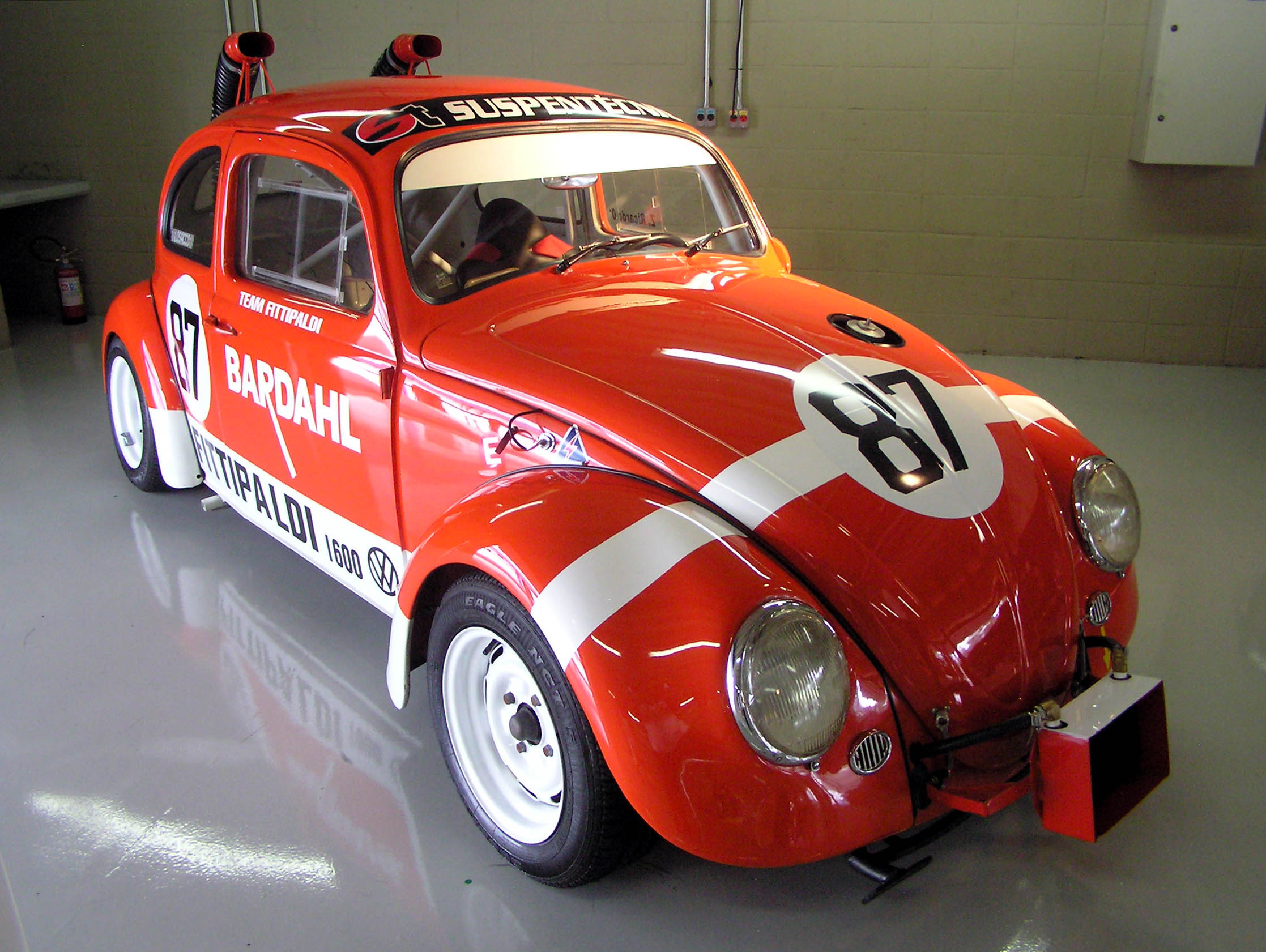
Twin-engine racing Beetle developed by Wilson and Emerson Fittipaldi

As Fittipaldi brothers

Before the Fittipaldis, three pairs of brothers had raced in Formula One: Jimmy and Jackie Stewart, Pedro and Ricardo Rodríguez, and Ernesto and Vittorio Brambilla. However, none of the siblings had competed in the same race. The Fittipaldi brothers were the first to compete in the same race, and also the first to score points in the same race: Wilson Fittipaldi only scored points in two Formula One races, (the 1973 Argentine Grand Prix and 1973 German Grand Prix), but on both occasions his younger brother, Emerson, also scored points (a win in Argentina and 6th in Germany).

Since the Fittipaldis, another six sets of brothers have competed in Formula One. Ian and Jody Scheckter, Gilles and Jacques Villeneuve Sr., Manfred and Joachim Winkelhock, Teo and Corrado Fabi, and Gary and David Brabham all failed to score points in the same race. Michael and Ralf Schumacher were the next to do so at the 1997 French Grand Prix.

As the father of a Formula One driver

Fittipaldi's son, Christian, made his debut in Formula One in 1992 and took his first point at the 1992 Japanese Grand Prix, making Wilson and Christian Fittipaldi the first parent and child to both score points in Formula One. They have since been followed by Graham and Damon Hill, Mario and Michael Andretti, Gilles and Jacques Villeneuve, Keke and Nico Rosberg, Satoru and Kazuki Nakajima, Nelson Piquet and Nelson Piquet Jr., Jan and Kevin Magnussen, Jos and Max Verstappen, Jonathan and Jolyon Palmer, and Michael and Mick Schumacher.

== Career in management and business ==
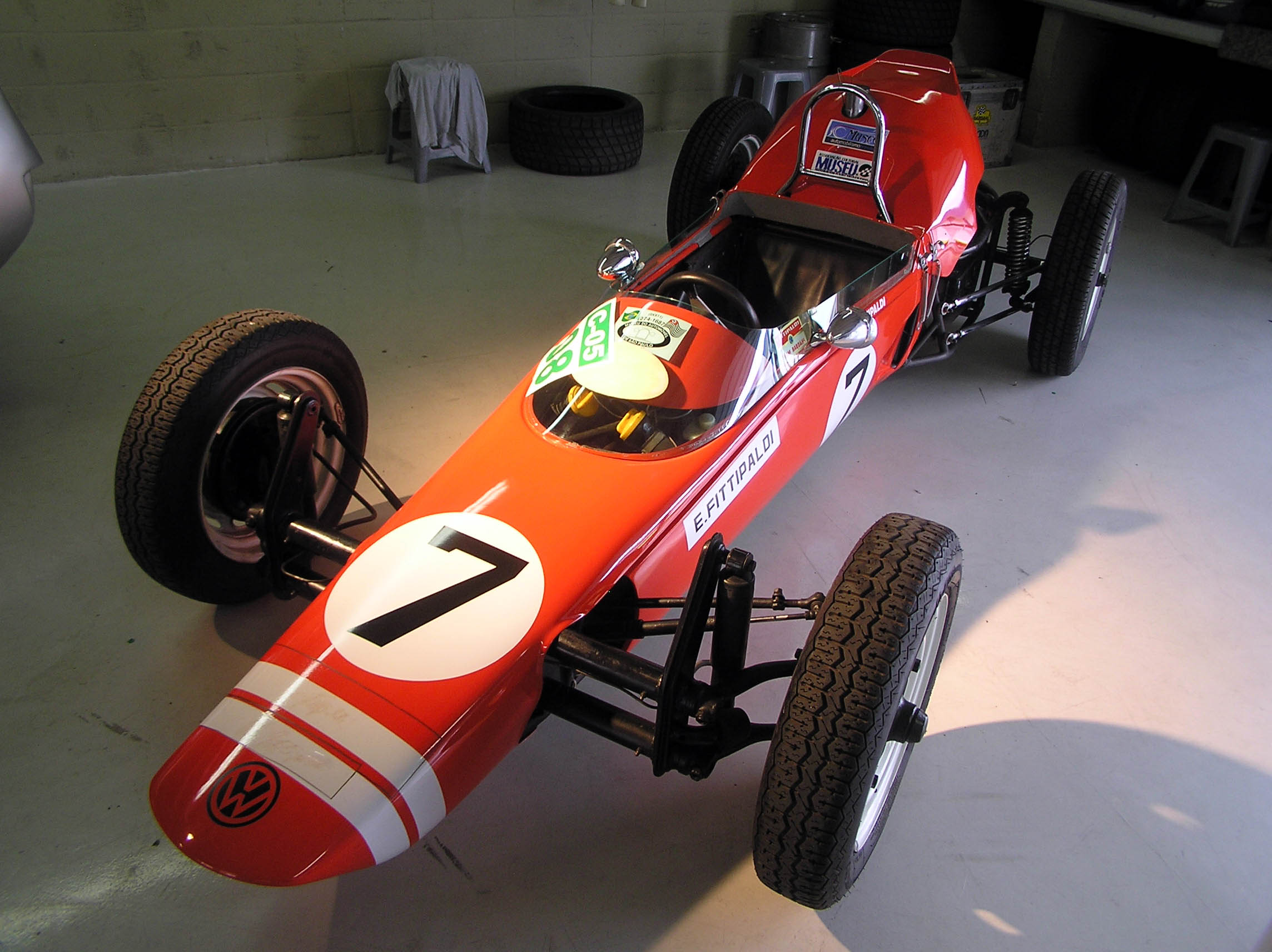
Team Fittipaldi's Fitti Vê, Formula Vee car that imported from Europe and sold by Fittipaldi brothers in Brazil in the 1960s.

Although their father was reluctant to fund racing careers for them, the Fittipaldi brothers were able to finance their early racing careers by setting up a successful custom car accessory business while still in their teens, and then businesses building karts and Formula Vee cars. There was also a Fittipaldi-Porsche project - a one-off sports car chassis with Porsche mechanicals that the brothers built and raced in 1968.

In mid-1974, Fittipaldi had persuaded Brazilian sugar and alcohol conglomerate Copersucar to sponsor his Formula One team, and from 1976 he had retired from driving and to concentrate on the management of the team, which ran with occasional flashes of success in Formula One from 1975 until it shut down in 1982.

After then, Fittipaldi involved himself with the family's business interests, including a Mercedes-Benz dealership. He also carried out some television work, and was involved in the racing career of his son, Christian, managing him from 1996. In 2004 he became technical director of the WB motorsport team in Brazilian V8 stock cars. This led to the younger Fittipaldi testing one of the cars in 2004 before taking part in the championship in 2005 with a different team.
