= DC =

DC most often refers to:

- Washington, D.C. (District of Columbia), the capital of the United States
- DC Comics, an American comic book publisher
- Direct current, electric current which flows in only one direction

DC, D.C., D/C, Dc, or dc may also refer to:

== Arts, entertainment and media ==
=== Music ===
- Da capo, a musical term
- DC (soundtrack), of the 2026 Indian film
- Destiny's Child, an American R&B group

=== Video games ===
- Da Capo (visual novel)
- Desert Combat, a Battlefield 1942 mod
- Dino Crisis, a survival horror game series

=== Other media ===
- DC Comics, an American comic book publisher
- DC (film), a 2026 Indian film
- D.C. (TV series)
- Detective Comics, a comic book series published by DC Comics
- DC Inside, a South Korean internet forum
- "DC" (Succession), a television episode

== Companies and products ==
- DC Recordings, a record label
- DC Shoes, an American sports footwear company
- Delta Clipper, a proposed rocketship series by McDonnell Douglas
- DC (Douglas Commercial), a series of aircraft by the Douglas Aircraft Company (and later McDonnell Douglas)
- Dyson vacuum cleaners, which use product code prefix DC
- Golden Air, an airline (IATA code DC)

== Government, law, and military ==
- Christian Democracy (Italy), a political party
- Christian Democracy (Brazil), a political party
- Detective constable, a police rank
- District collector, an Indian Administrative Service position
- Deputy commissioner, an administrative rank
- Dossier criminal, in Indian policing

== People ==
- Dan Caplen, British singer-songwriter (stage name "D/C")
- Daniel Cormier (born 1979) Olympic wrestler and heavyweight mixed martial artist
- David Coulthard (born 1971) British racing driver, known as DC
- Donald L. Cox (1936–2011), American leader of the Black Panther Party, known as Field Marshal DC
- Augustin Pyramus de Candolle (1778–1841), botanist (standard author abbreviation DC.)

== Places ==
- Washington, D.C. (District of Columbia), the capital of the United States
- Bogotá, Distrito Capital, the capital city of Colombia
- Dubai City
- West Sulawesi (vehicle registration prefix DC)

== Religion ==
- DC, a dominical letter indicating a leap year starting on Thursday
- Christian Doctrine Fathers, a Catholic organization
- Daughters of Charity of Saint Vincent de Paul, a Society of Apostolic Life for women within the Catholic Church
- Deuterocanon, books of the Bible which are considered non-canonical by Protestant denominations

== Schools ==
- Delaware County Christian School, in Pennsylvania, US
- Dhaka College, in Bangladesh
- Dominican Convent High School, Bulawayo, a Catholic high school for girls in Zimbabwe
- Dominican Convent Primary School, Bulawayo, a Catholic preparatory school for girls in Zimbabwe

== Science, technology and mathematics ==
=== Biology and medicine ===
- Dendritic cell, a class of immune cell
- Doctor of Chiropractic, a qualification in alternative medicine

=== Computing ===
- dc (computer program), a command-line based calculator on Unix-derived systems
- DC coefficient, in a discrete cosine transform
- Data center, a physical location housing computing-related gear
- Device context, part of the legacy Microsoft Windows graphics API
- Differential cryptanalysis
- DigiCipher, a digital encoding scheme
- Direct Connect (protocol), for file sharing
- Domain Component, an attribute in LDAP
- Domain controller, a server used to manage a Microsoft Windows domain
- Dublin Core, a metadata standard
- Dynamic contrast, an LCD technology

=== Mathematics ===
- dc (elliptic function), in complex analysis
- Axiom of dependent choice, in set theory
- DC, 600 in Roman numerals
- DC, 220 in hexadecimal

=== Other uses in science, technology and mathematics ===
- Direct current, electric current which flows in only one direction
- dC, decicoulomb, a tenth of a Coulomb, the SI unit of electric charge
- New Zealand DC class locomotive
- Methylphosphonyl dichloride, a chemical weapons precursor
- A don't care term, in digital logic
- Drop center (DC) rim; see Single-piece wheel manufacturing

== Sports ==
- Delhi Capitals, an Indian Premier League cricket franchise
- Deccan Chargers, a former Indian Premier League cricket franchise

== Other uses ==
- Demon Cat, a ghost cat in American folklore
- Distribution center, a building stocked with goods for delivery
- Dream character, an imaginary entity in a person's dreams
- Drower Collection, a collection of Mandaic manuscripts held at the Bodleian Library in Oxford, UK

== See also ==
- D&C (disambiguation)
- AC/DC (disambiguation)
- Divide and conquer (disambiguation)
