= 2018 New York gubernatorial Democratic primary =

- September 13, 2018
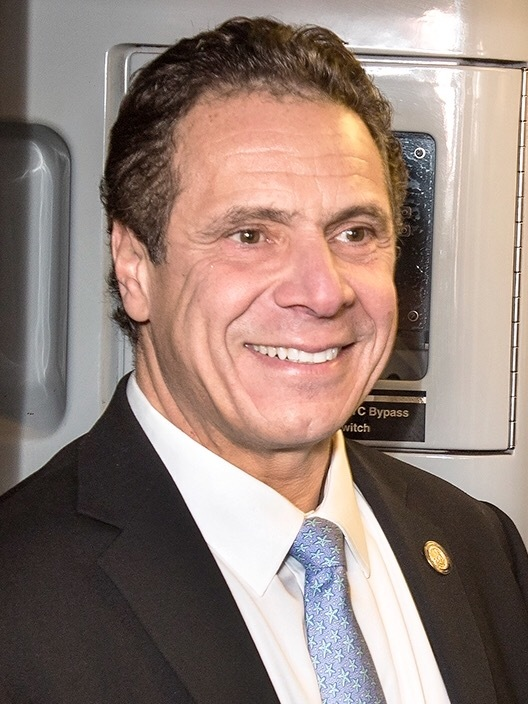

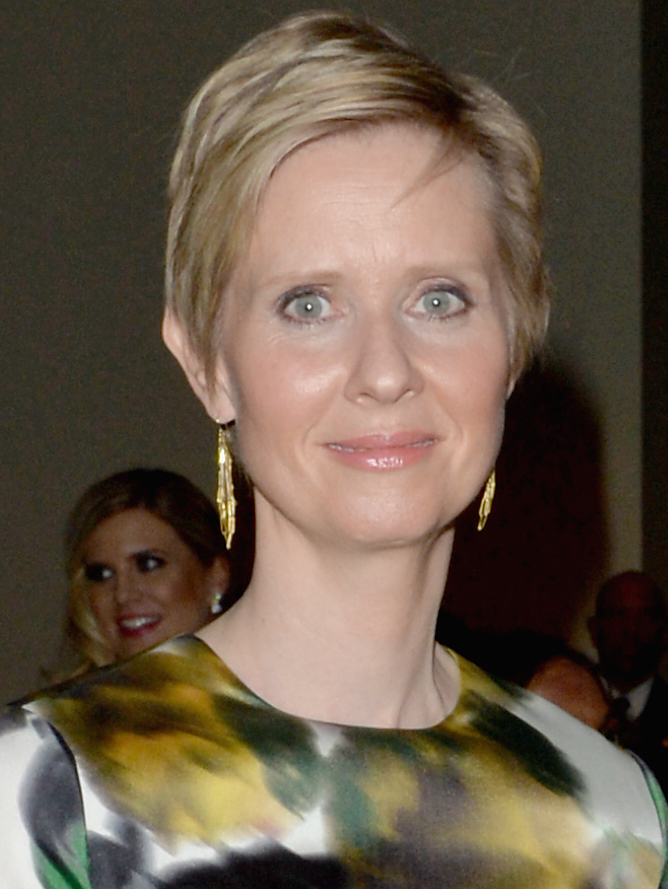
Nominee	Andrew Cuomo	Cynthia Nixon
Party	Democratic	Democratic
Popular vote	1,021,160	537,192
Percentage	65.57%	34.47%
- County results Cuomo: 50–60% 60–70% 70–80% 80–90% Nixon: 50–60%
Democratic nominee for Governor of New York
TBD

The 2018 New York gubernatorial Democratic primary was held on September 13, 2018. Incumbent Governor Andrew Cuomo, seeking a third term, faced a primary challenge from actress and activist Cynthia Nixon. Cuomo won with 65.57% of the vote to Nixon's 34.47%. The primary was held on a Thursday, rather than the customary Tuesday, to avoid conflicting with Rosh Hashanah.

Nixon ran on a progressive platform centered on subway funding, single-payer healthcare, and opposition to what she described as Cuomo's tolerance of a Republican-aligned bloc of breakaway Democrats in the New York State Senate. Cuomo spent more than $25 million on the campaign and consolidated endorsements from Hillary Clinton, Joe Biden, and most of the state's Democratic officeholders. In the final days of the campaign, the New York State Democratic Committee, which Cuomo effectively controlled, sent a mailer to Jewish voters that falsely accused Nixon of supporting the BDS movement and of being "silent on the rise of anti-Semitism." Cuomo disavowed the mailer after it drew widespread condemnation.

== Background ==
Andrew Cuomo was first elected governor of New York in 2010 and re-elected in 2014, when he received 54% of the vote against Republican Rob Astorino and faced a primary challenge from Fordham University law professor Zephyr Teachout, who won 34% without significant funding or institutional support. Cuomo announced his intention to seek a third term on November 15, 2016.

Throughout his second term, Cuomo faced persistent criticism from the left over his relationship with the Independent Democratic Conference (IDC), a group of eight state Senate Democrats who caucused with Republicans, giving the Republicans functional control of the chamber despite Democrats holding more seats statewide. Cuomo's opponents argued that he had cultivated and protected the IDC to block progressive legislation, keeping his business-friendly donors satisfied while maintaining a veneer of moderation. Cuomo denied this, though he acknowledged having little power to compel the IDC back into the mainline Democratic conference.

Cuomo's record on the Metropolitan Transportation Authority (MTA) was another source of criticism. The New York City Subway had deteriorated noticeably during his tenure, with service delays reaching historic levels. While Cuomo had authority over the MTA board, he frequently deflected responsibility for the system's condition to New York City and the federal government.

In March 2018, one of Cuomo's closest aides, Joe Percoco, was convicted on three counts of bribery. Although Cuomo was not charged, his name appeared 136 times during the trial and his campaign, office, and staff were mentioned more than 1,500 times collectively.

== Candidates ==
=== Andrew Cuomo ===
Andrew Cuomo is the son of former Governor Mario Cuomo, who held the office from 1983 to 1994. He served as Secretary of Housing and Urban Development under President Bill Clinton from 1997 to 2001, and as Attorney General of New York from 2007 to 2010 before winning the governorship. Cuomo positioned his re-election campaign around his record of passing same-sex marriage legislation in 2011, raising the minimum wage to $15 per hour, and creating the Excelsior Scholarship program for free college tuition. He also pointed to his record of rebuilding infrastructure after Hurricane Sandy.

Cuomo's political operation was backed by major labor unions and real estate interests. His campaign spent more than $25 million, including a reported $8 million in television advertising over three weeks in the late summer. DNC chairman Tom Perez, who had pledged to remain neutral in primaries, appeared at the state Democratic convention to endorse Cuomo, drawing a formal rebuke from his own deputy chairman.

=== Cynthia Nixon ===
Cynthia Nixon is an actress best known for playing Miranda Hobbes on the HBO series Sex and the City from 1998 to 2004, for which she won a Primetime Emmy Award in 2004. She had been a prominent education activist in New York City for years before her gubernatorial candidacy, advocating for public schools and against school privatization.

Nixon announced her candidacy on March 19, 2018, with a video in which she said: "We are now the most unequal state in the entire country, with both incredible wealth and extreme poverty." In her announcement and on her campaign website, she outlined health care, public schools, and MTA funding as her top priorities. She also attacked Cuomo directly, saying: "If Washington is a swamp, then Albany is a cesspool."

Nixon had not previously held elected or appointed government office, which became one of the central lines of attack against her candidacy. The New York Times editorial board, which endorsed Cuomo, wrote that "Nixon's lack of experience in government or management of any sort do not inspire confidence," while expressing little enthusiasm for the incumbent himself. Supporters argued that her career as a public school advocate, combined with the failures of career politicians to address the MTA crisis and corruption in Albany, made the experience critique less convincing than it might otherwise have been.

Nixon secured the Working Families Party nomination on April 14, 2018, by a 91-to-8 delegate margin, with Jumaane Williams as her running mate. The WFP endorsement came after the labor unions that had previously enabled Cuomo to control the party's 2014 nomination process withdrew from the party, removing his ability to block Nixon as he had blocked Zephyr Teachout four years earlier.

Nixon failed to meet the 25% delegate threshold required to qualify for the Democratic primary ballot at the state convention on May 23, 2018. By July 12, however, she had collected 65,000 petition signatures, more than four times the 15,000 required to force a primary.

== Campaign ==
=== Early months ===
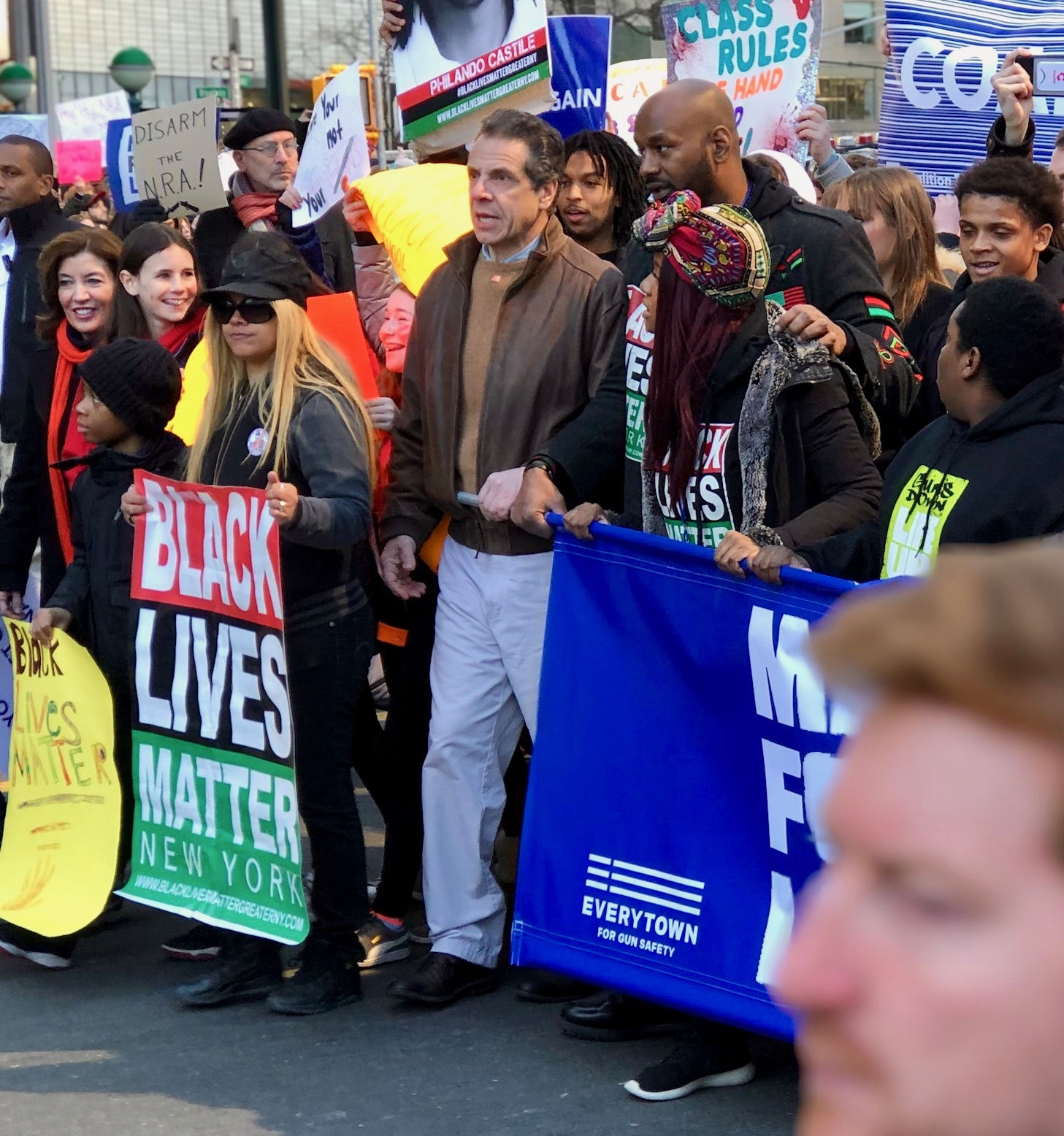
Andrew Cuomo at the lead of the NYC 2018 March For Our Lives rally

Nixon announced her candidacy on March 19, 2018, with a video in which she said: "We are now the most unequal state in the entire country, with both incredible wealth and extreme poverty." On her campaign website she listed health care, public schools, and MTA funding as her top priorities, and attacked Cuomo directly, saying: "If Washington is a swamp, then Albany is a cesspool." The announcement came less than a week after Percoco's bribery conviction.

In April, as Nixon's campaign drew attention, Cuomo brokered a deal to reunite the IDC members with the mainline Democratic conference, a move Nixon's supporters attributed to her campaign's pressure. Several IDC members faced primary challenges on September 13 from progressive candidates backed by the same organisations supporting Nixon. Nixon called for the legalisation of recreational marijuana as a racial justice measure, citing the racial disparity in marijuana arrests. She stated: "Eighty percent of the New Yorkers arrested for marijuana are black or Latino, despite the fact that whites and people of color use marijuana at roughly the same rates." She said that new marijuana business licenses should prioritise communities most harmed by drug enforcement, describing it as "a form of reparations." Cuomo had previously called marijuana a "gateway drug" and kept the state's medical marijuana program highly restricted.

=== State convention ===
At the state Democratic convention on May 23, Cuomo won support from over 95% of delegates. Nixon was not offered a speaking slot at the convention; she attended anyway and told reporters: "It's my party too. I'm a lifelong Democrat." Having failed to reach the 25% delegate threshold required for a convention ballot line, Nixon launched a petition drive to force a primary by collecting signatures from registered Democrats. She aimed to gather 50,000 signatures as a show of strength, well above the 15,000 legally required. More than 3,000 volunteers gathered signatures across the state. By July 12, Nixon had submitted 65,000 signatures, more than four times the minimum required. In submitting the petitions, Nixon said: "In New York, a candidate can be knocked from the ballot for something as small as having a page out of order. The system is not designed to give voters a choice. It is designed to protect the status quo." No legal challenge to her petitions was ultimately filed.

=== Race begins to ramp up ===
After Alexandria Ocasio-Cortez defeated U.S. Representative Joseph Crowley in a June 26 congressional primary, speculation mounted that Nixon could pull off a similar upset. Nixon publicly aligned herself with Ocasio-Cortez's victory and called herself a democratic socialist.

Cuomo spent the summer blitzing the airwaves, putting more than $8 million into television advertising over three weeks in late August and early September. He seldom mentioned Nixon by name during the campaign. The night before the vote he told a campaign rally: "You cannot be a progressive if you cannot deliver progress. And a New York progressive is not just a dreamer, but we are doers."

External videos
- New York Democratic Primary Gubernatorial Debate, August 30, 2018, YouTube

A single debate between Cuomo and Nixon was held on August 29, 2018, at Hofstra University in Hempstead on Long Island. During the debate, the two candidates clashed over the MTA, corruption in Albany, and Nixon's qualifications. Cuomo's campaign team live-tweeted commentary during the debate, calling Nixon "unhinged," while Cuomo himself worked to maintain composure on stage.

The debate took place the same week that Cuomo, speaking at a bill-signing ceremony in New York City, said that "America was never that great," a remark intended to counter Donald Trump's "Make America Great Again" slogan. The comment drew immediate backlash, including a tweet from Trump himself, and the governor's office quickly walked it back.

=== Mailer controversy ===
In the days before the September 13 primary, the New York State Democratic Committee sent a mailer to Jewish voters in the New York City area. The mailer read, "With anti-Semitism and bigotry on the rise, we can't take a chance with inexperienced Cynthia Nixon," and falsely accused her of supporting the Boycott, Divestment, Sanctions movement against Israel and of being "silent on the rise of anti-Semitism." Nixon, whose two older children are being raised in the Jewish faith and whose synagogue is Congregation Beit Simchat Torah, an LGBT congregation in Manhattan, called the mailer "deeply, deeply offensive" and demanded the party's executive director be fired.

Cuomo's campaign initially said the governor "didn't approve of or have any knowledge of the mailer in question." Cuomo himself subsequently said the mailer was "inappropriate" and distanced himself from it, while also saying "I have no authority in this situation." The Washington Post subsequently reported that political operatives connected to the governor's office had written and approved the mailer.

State party executive director Geoff Berman tweeted an apology, calling the mailer "a mistake," and said the party would send a mailing of Nixon's choosing to the same list of voters. De Blasio called the apology "laughable" and said the party must compensate the Nixon campaign directly.

== Endorsements ==
Andrew Cuomo

U.S. Cabinet members and Cabinet-level officials

- Joe Biden, 47th Vice President of the United States
- Hillary Rodham Clinton, 67th United States Secretary of State, 2008 Democratic presidential candidate and 2016 Democratic nominee for President
- Tom Perez, 26th United States Secretary of Labor, Chairman of the Democratic National Committee

N.Y. Lieutenant Governor

- Kathy Hochul, N.Y. Lieutenant Governor (D-NY)

U.S. Senators

- Kirsten Gillibrand, U.S. Senator (D-NY)
- Chuck Schumer, U.S. Senator and Senate Minority Leader (D-NY)

U.S. Representatives

- Nancy Pelosi, U.S. Representative (D-CA-12)
- José E. Serrano, U.S. Representative (D-NY-15)
- Nydia Velázquez, U.S. Representative (D-NY-7)

Local and state politicians

- Corey Johnson, Speaker of the New York City Council
- Marcos Crespo, Assemblymember, Chair of the Bronx County Democratic Committee

Individuals

- Amy Schumer, comedian, actress and distant cousin of Chuck Schumer

Organizations

- 1199SEIU United Healthcare Workers East
- Human Rights Campaign
- National Organization for Women – New York
- New York State Democratic Committee
- United Food & Commercial Workers Local 1500
- Planned Parenthood Empire State Acts
- NYS AFL-CIO
- Civil Service Employees Association
- Stonewall Democrats
- Public Employees Federation
- Citizens Union
- Everytown for Gun Safety

Media

- Buffalo News editorial
- New York Times editorial board team
Cynthia Nixon

State legislators

- Tom Abinanti, state assemblymember from the 92nd district (2011–2022)
- Andrew Hevesi, state assemblymember from the 28th district (2005–present)

Local officials

- Brad Lander, city councilmember from the 39th district (2010–2021)
- Melissa Mark-Viverito, former Speaker of the New York City Council (2014–2017) from the 8th district (2006–2017)
- Jimmy Van Bramer, city councilmember from the 26th district (2010–2021)

Individuals

- El-P, rapper, record producer, and record executive
- Bill McKibben, environmentalist
- Alexandria Ocasio-Cortez, nominee for NY-14, educator, political organizer, and former congressional staffer
- Sarah Jessica Parker, actress
- Julia Salazar, candidate for New York State Senate District 18
- Richard Stallman, president of the Free Software Foundation

Organizations

- 350 Action
- Citizen Action
- Daily Kos
- Democracy for America
- NYC Democratic Socialists
- Indivisible Brooklyn
- Jim Owles Club
- Justice Democrats
- Our Revolution
- Progressive Change Campaign Committee
- Working Families Party

Media

- The Nation

== Polling ==
Poll source	Date(s) administered	Sample size	Margin of error	Andrew Cuomo	Cynthia Nixon	Other	Undecided
Siena College	September 4–7, 2018	509	± 4.3%	63%	22%	4%	11%
Siena College	July 22–26, 2018	630	± 3.9%	60%	29%	1%	10%
Quinnipiac University	July 12–16, 2018	415	± 6.2%	59%	23%	2%	15%
Zogby Analytics	June 27 – July 3, 2018	–	–	63%	22%	–	15%
Siena College	June 4–7, 2018	–	–	61%	26%	0%	11%
Quinnipiac University	April 26 – May 1, 2018	473	± 5.7%	50%	28%	–	22%
Siena College	April 8–12, 2018	–	–	58%	27%	5%	11%
Marist College	April 3–9, 2018	364	± 6.0%	68%	21%	–	11%
Remington (R-Big Dog Strategies)	April 7–8, 2018	2,038	± 2.2%	60%	20%	–	19%
Siena College	March 11–16, 2018	363	± 4.0%	66%	19%	1%	9%

== Results ==
2018 Democratic primary results Governor of New York
Party	Candidate	Votes	%
Democratic	Andrew Cuomo (incumbent)	1,021,160	65.53%
Democratic	Cynthia Nixon	537,192	34.47%
Total votes		1,558,352	100%

The Associated Press projected Cuomo the winner within 30 minutes of polls closing. Total primary turnout of approximately 1.55 million was almost triple the 575,000 who had voted in the 2014 Democratic gubernatorial primary, a figure that observers attributed both to the contested down-ballot races and to elevated Democratic enthusiasm following the election of Donald Trump in 2016.

Nixon's vote share of 34.47% was nearly identical to the 34% Zephyr Teachout had received in the 2014 primary, though Teachout's campaign had been far less organized and received much less national attention. The convergence of the two results suggested a rough ceiling for an anti-Cuomo challenge within the Democratic electorate of that period, and also indicated that Nixon, despite significantly greater resources and visibility than Teachout had possessed, had not substantially expanded the insurgent coalition.

Cuomo's running mate, incumbent Lieutenant Governor Kathy Hochul, survived a much closer race, defeating Jumaane Williams by 53% to 47%.

== Aftermath ==
In her election-night remarks at Cafe Omar in Brooklyn, Nixon said: "We took on one of the most powerful governors in America. It wasn't easy. We had to fight just to get on the ballot. We had to fight just to get a debate. We started with nothing and we earned every single vote."

Following Nixon's unsuccessful gubernatorial primary campaign, arrangements had to be made for the Working Families Party to endorse the Democratic nominee, Cuomo. This was due to election laws (at the time) that required Nixon to run for a different office, since the party had endorsed her prior to the September primary. Nixon and WFP leadership chose to run in this district, where she lives. While there was some local support for Nixon, she did not actively campaign.

Cuomo went on to defeat Republican Marc Molinaro in the November general election by 59.6% to 36.2%. Representative Kathleen Rice, who had endorsed Cuomo, told the Washington Post after the primary: "There is no question that she pushed him further to the left." Cuomo's policy positions on marijuana legalization, voting rights restoration, and MTA funding shifted noticeably toward positions Nixon had advocated during the campaign.

== See also ==
- 2018 New York gubernatorial election
- Independent Democratic Conference
- Working Families Party
- Andrew Cuomo
- Cynthia Nixon
