= DNC =

DNC may refer to:

== Business ==
- Delaware North, a global food service and hospitality company formerly known as Delaware North Companies
- Den norske Creditbank, a now-defunct Norwegian commercial bank

== Education ==
- Dore Numa College, a government-owned secondary school in Warri, Nigeria

== Politics ==
- Democratic National Committee, the principal campaign and fund-raising organization affiliated with the United States Democratic Party
- Democratic National Convention, a series of national conventions held every four years since 1832 by the United States Democratic Party
- Daigaku Nyushi Center, a colloquial term for the National Center for University Entrance Examinations, a Japanese government agency
- Director of Naval Communications, a former United States Navy staff post
- Director of Naval Construction, a former senior post in the British Admiralty
- Do not call list, a registry of telephone numbers in several western countries whose owners have opted out of unsolicited telephone marketing calls
  - Do Not Call Register (Australia)
  - National Do Not Call List (Canada)
  - National Do Not Call Registry (United States)
- United States District Court for the District of North Carolina, a former U.S. District Court
- Domestic Names Committee of the United States Board on Geographic Names

== Science and technology ==
- Declared net capacity or developed net capacity, a measure of the contribution that a power station makes to the distribution grid
- Dilation and curettage (sometimes pronounced or spelled DNC) - a gynecological procedure
- Dinitro-ortho-cresol, a herbicide
- Direct numerical control or distributed numerical control, in manufacturing, a common term for networking CNC machine tools
- Do not connect: a common acronym in the description of integrated circuits connections
- Desert Night Camouflage, a type of military camouflage.
- Differentiable neural computer, a type of neural network architecture.

== See also ==
- D&C (disambiguation)
- DC (disambiguation)
