= The Stolen Dormouse =

- Short story by L. Sprague de Camp
- cover of Astounding Science-Fiction, April 1941, illustrating The Stolen Dormouse
- Country: United States
- Language: English
- Genre: Science fiction

Publication
- Published in: Astounding Science-Fiction
- Publisher: Street & Smith
- Media type: Print (Magazine)
- Publication date: April, May 1941

"The Stolen Dormouse" is a science fiction novella by American writer L. Sprague de Camp. It was first published as a serial in the magazine Astounding Science-Fiction for April and May, 1941 and first appeared in book form in de Camp's collection Divide and Rule (Fantasy Press, 1948). The story has also appeared in the anthologies Astounding Stories: The 60th Anniversary Collection (Easton Press, 1990), and The Best of Astounding: Classic Short Novels from the Golden Age of Science Fiction (Carroll & Graf, 1992).

== Plot summary ==
The America of 2236 is a loose-knit empire in which power is exercised by rival business conglomerates organized on feudal principles. Employees are born into these companies, which command their loyalty and for which they work their entire lives. Among them are the Crosley and Stromberg companies, which act as the Montagues and Capulets in the protagonists' Romeo and Juliet-like romance.

Main character Horace Juniper-Hallett is a Whitecollar for the Crosley company. Elevated to the rank of Businessman for meritorious conduct in the conflict with the enemy Strombergs, he is subsequently cast out of his company after an unauthorized squabble with Stromberg employee Lane-Walsh, who is also busted. But Horace's dishonor is merely a ruse on the part of Crosley chairman Archwin Taylor-Thing to allow him to act as a confidential investigator on his behalf; if successful, he will be reinstated and promoted.

It seems the country's mausoleums are filled with "dormice" (named after the hibernating rodent species) -- people of former eras who had themselves placed in suspended animation, hoping to be revived in a world better than that they left. One such "dormouse," an engineer named Arnold Ryan, has gone missing. It is thought he has been stolen by another firm to be revived for his specialized and potentially highly profitable knowledge. Horace Juniper-Hallett is to find out what became of Ryan, and if possible secure him for the Crosleys.

Complications present themselves. Horace has fallen for Janet Bickam-Coates, a wonderful girl but a Stromberg, which is a big no-no. He also finds himself in an uneasy alliance with erstwhile foe Lane-Walsh, who turns out to be on the same undercover assignment for the rival firm. Eventually they discover Ryan is part of something far bigger than corporate one-upmanship; nothing less than a vast conspiracy against the status quo among the lowly engineers whose ill-recompensed work underpins the companies' wealth.

The investigators fall out; Lane-Walsh is eager to expose the plot, while Horace is inclined to join it, since his romance with Janet is doomed if society remains the same. As the authorities close in Horace and Janet escape with Ryan to Hawaii, in this future a free nation resisting corporate dominance. Ryan's secrets will enable Hawaii to undercut the corporations and subvert their regime.

== Reception ==
John K. Aiken, writing in Fantasy Review, rates de Camp "very nearly at his best" in this story, and his best as "very good indeed." He considers it "[a]ltogether, as sprightly and enjoyable a [tale] as one might meet in a couple of years' reading." He appreciates the basis of de Camp's science fiction "in the behaviour of real people living in unfamiliar social set-ups, logically developed from to-day's trends or from a given premise." He considers the story "more solidly based" than "Divide and Rule", the piece with which it was published in book form; "[t]he reader, however, will recognise the irrepressible de Camp in the description of the hero's wedding night, spent under his wife's bed in the company of a tame puma and in the throes of hay fever."

Astounding reviewer P. Schuyler Miller deemed it "[o]ne of the joys of the days of the old middle-sized Astounding," and as exhibiting "the same detailed knowledge of history which gave us "Lest Darkness Fall" ... to set up hypothetical future societies which ape those of the past--with differences." He praised the story for "provid[ing] more sheer entertainment than any the fantasy publishers have yet given us."

Sam Moskowitz wrote "de Camp was holding his own against a formidable array of competition in science fiction that included Heinlein, van Vogt, Sturgeon and Asimov. 'The Stolen Dormouse' ... was as clever and adroit in its image of American big business hardening into feudal cast[e]s as anything his contemporaries were doing in their specialties at the time."

William Mattathias Robins finds "[t]he two stories ... appropriately linked because [each] takes place in the future, with an aristocratic social milieu. "Dormouse," which he notes "is a variation on the Romeo and Juliet story," "traces a boy's transition to manhood, his developing political awareness, and his winning of his heart's desire" as he fights "bigotry, the class system, and his family" to help "overthrow [a] corrupt mercantile society."

John J. Pierce remarks that though "[t]he plot centers on a conspiracy by engineers who resent feudal exploitation, ... de Camp's attitude is apolitical, and nothing in "The Stolen Dormouse" is meant to be taken more seriously than the ritual of breaking an esquire to the lowly whitecollar ranks: 'You have been found unworthy of the honors of businesshood. Hand over your briefcase.'"

According to Earl Terry Kemp the story "shows de Camp's pre-war work at its best, [and] was a landmark in integrating adventure into the society out of which it arises." He feels the author "has played with the forces that form a society in a very amusing way which shows considerable sociological insight" and that "[a]s is frequently the case with de Camp's work, the ideas behind the story are even more interesting than the [story itself]. De Camp's work is a sort of Lewis Carroll nonsense-made-sensible--and that phrase best describes the ... novella."

Jamie Todd Rubin writes "[t]his is the type of story that one might imagine appears more frequently in the 1960s than the 1940s, an attempt to look at where society is going, and a rebellion against corporations and where they might lead. In some sense, de Camp was ahead of his time here." He also notes that de Camp "does a good job of infusing his fiction with humor that works well," and "has one of the most modern styles of writing of any of the Astounding authors" of the era, meaning "his writing generally seems devoid of pulp and his themes often apply equally well today as they did seventy years ago." He rates the piece as "a good story" but "wasn’t overly impressed by [it] because I feel like I’ve seen its like before."
