= BBS Autotechnik =

German car wheel manufacturer

BBS Autotechnik GmbH
- Formerly: BBS Kraftfahrzeugtechnik AG (1970–2021)
- Type: Subsidiary
- Industry: Manufacturing
- Founded: 1970 (56 years ago)
- Founders: Heinrich Baumgartner; Klaus Brand
- Headquarters: Fichtenberg, Germany
- Key people: Jurgen Klingelmeyer (Germany); Craig Donnelly (USA); Kenny Baynes (USA); Jesse Hemans (USA)
- Products: Wheel rims
- Revenue: ▲€163 million (2006)
- Number of employees: 1,200
- Parent: KW Automotive
- Website: bbs.com

BBS Autotechnik GmbH, formerly known as BBS Kraftfahrzeugtechnik AG (English: BBS Autotechnique GmbH, previously BBS Automotive Technology AG), is a high-performance automobile wheel design company headquartered in Schiltach, Germany. BBS produces wheels for motorsport, OEM, and aftermarket applications. The company is often credited as pioneering the three-piece wheel and advancing the aluminum wheel industry over many decades, and remains one of the largest producers of automobile wheels in the world. Since 2021, it has been a part of KW Automotive.

The company employs approximately 1,200 employees worldwide (2018). BBS was traded on the Frankfurt Stock Exchange (Symbol: BKS3) with a market capitalization of €8.15M.

== History ==
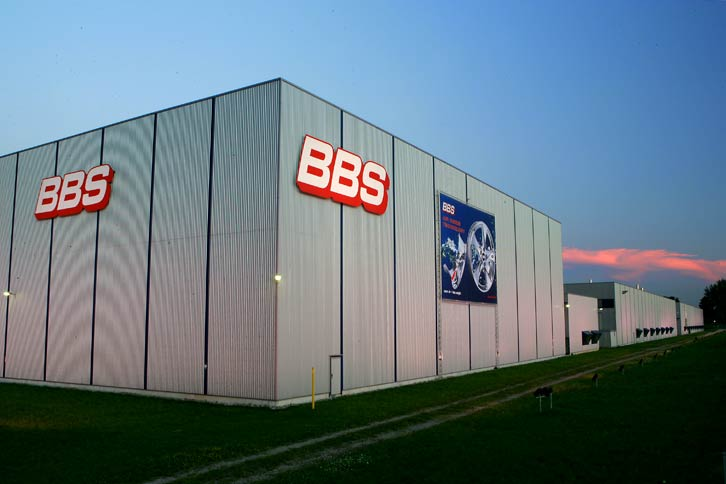
Finishing facility in Herbolzheim, Germany

BBS Kraftfahrzeugtechnik AG began in 1970 in Schiltach, Germany, by Heinrich Baumgartner and Klaus Brand as a manufacturing plant for plastic auto body parts. The initials BBS are based on the last names of the two founders and the city in which the company was founded (Baumgartner, Brand, Schiltach).

In 1972, a year after SSR debuted their MK1 three-piece wheel, BBS pioneered the development of their own three-piece racing wheel, a revolution in motorsport design. This original wheel was called the BBS Mahle, named as such due to its partnership with Mahle for manufacturing. By 1975, BBS had developed the popular cross-spoke design and the counter pressure process. BBS entered into a technical cooperation agreement in 1990 with ASA, a Korean company that was starting wheel production. In 1993, BBS merged the gap between their three-piece forged wheel and one-piece cast wheel with the two-piece design found in the RSII, defining BBS as a pioneer in one-, two-, and three-piece wheels. BBS developed a magnesium forged wheel in 1994 for motorsports use, especially in Formula One, which was over 20% lighter than the standard cast aluminum wheels. In 1995, BBS developed the first one-piece flow-formed cast wheel, with the use of FEM analysis. The first hollow-spoke wheel was also developed by BBS, in collaboration with Porsche and Kuka, in 2000. Many of the design elements that BBS has developed and popularized over the years have gone on to be replicated in the automotive and aftermarket industry, such as stepped-lip barrels, Y-shaped spokes, colored center caps, and lug covers.

In May 1987, BBS had its initial public offering, and continues to be traded on the Frankfurt Stock Exchange.

In 2007, the primary country where BBS sourced aluminum from, Guinea, experienced political unrest which caused market prices for aluminum to increase dramatically. This significantly affected the company's business and revenue, leading to bankruptcy for BBS and being taken over by the Belgian firm Punch International. In July 2015, South Korean firm Nice Corp became the majority owner. In 2020, BBS Automotive GmbH filed for insolvency, but was acquired by KW Automotive in March 2021, a multinational automotive suspension parts company.

In partnership with KW, BBS has since unveiled new partnerships and endeavors, such as BBS Unlimited, a way to customize and order countless configurations of wheels, rather than relying on only model-specific offerings. BBS unveiled a new wheel technology named Fortega in January 2023 at the Tokyo Auto Salon. The Fortega line of wheels utilizes a new proprietary aluminum alloy which was developed over a period of 10 years, which is stronger and more rigid with 10% lighter weight than conventional aluminum alloys, especially for high-weight electric vehicles.

== Technology ==
The multi-stage forging process used by BBS wheels is complex in that it uses multiple stages of compression at 8,000 to 10,000 tons of pressure to densify the wheel blank, while being heated to over 400 °C (750 °F) between steps. This process achieves an ideal material structure with high density and strength, which allows for lightweight and thin milling.

In modern times, BBS engineered the Air Inside Technology (AIT) in 2002, where hollow chambers are created within the wheel structure to compensate for the small air volume in modern ultra-low-profile tires, reduce unsprung weight, improve handling dynamics, and increase fuel efficiency without sacrificing strength and rigidity. This innovation earned BBS Kraftfahrzeugtechnik the Automechanika Innovation Award 2006 in the tuning segment.

BBS continues to produce one-, two-, and three-piece forged wheels out of aluminum and magnesium alloys, as well as high performance flow-formed wheels and low-pressure cast wheels. BBS also actively uses specialized quality and weight optimization methods, such as CNC back-milled spokes, x-ray inspection, FEM analysis, flow-forming, ceramic polishing, stainless steel lip bumpers, and heat treatment.

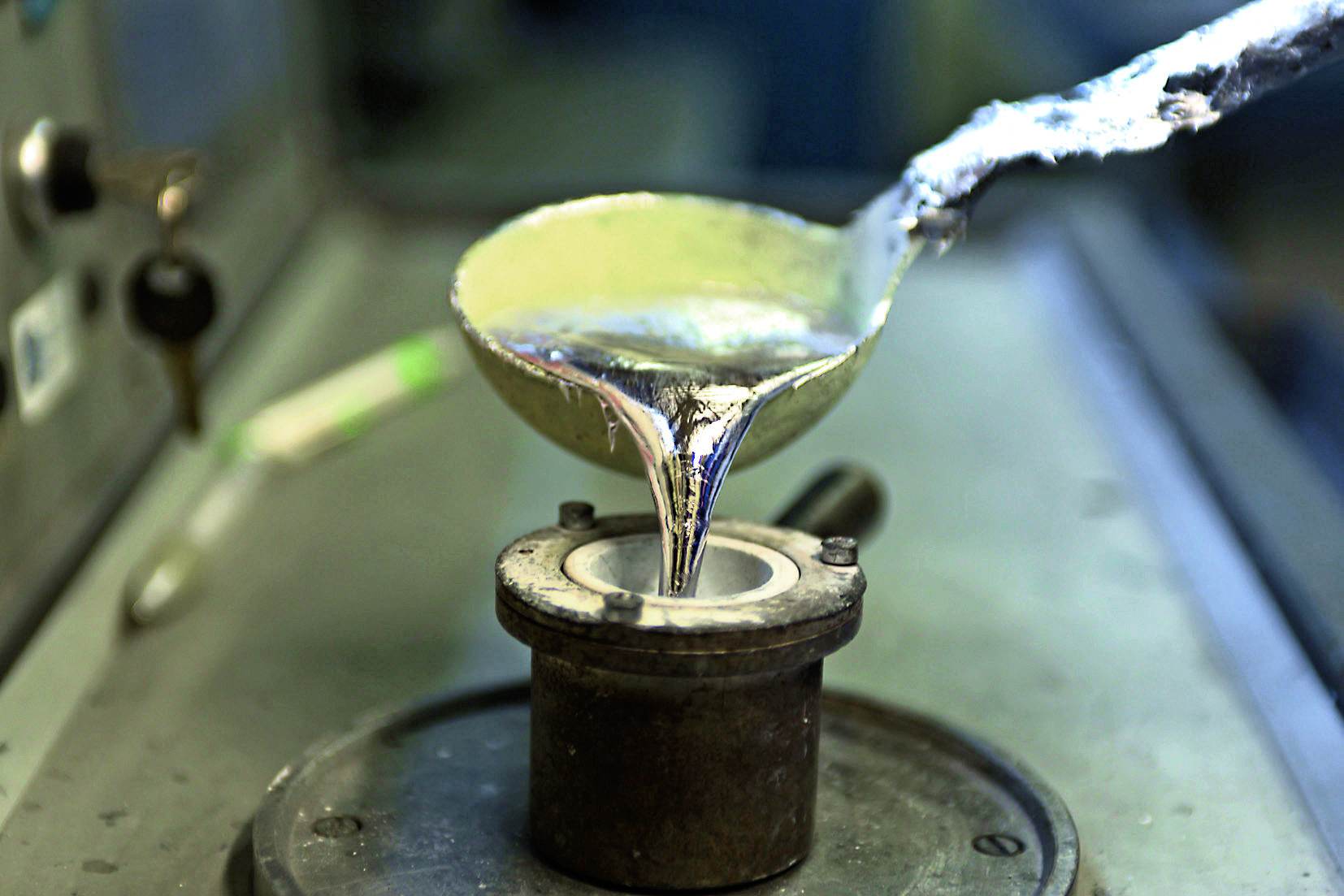
Metal sampling during manufacturing at BBS

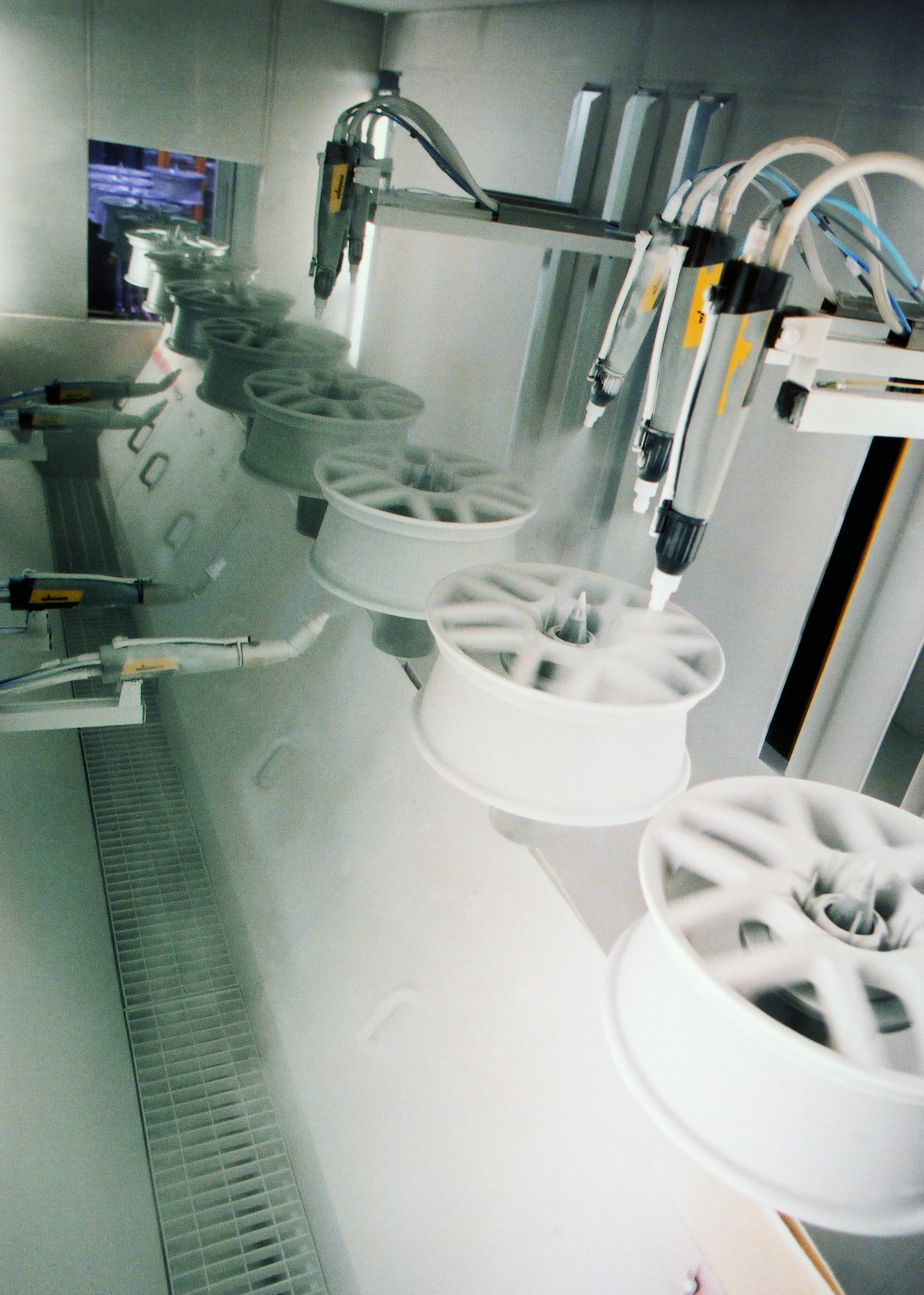
Finishing process at BBS

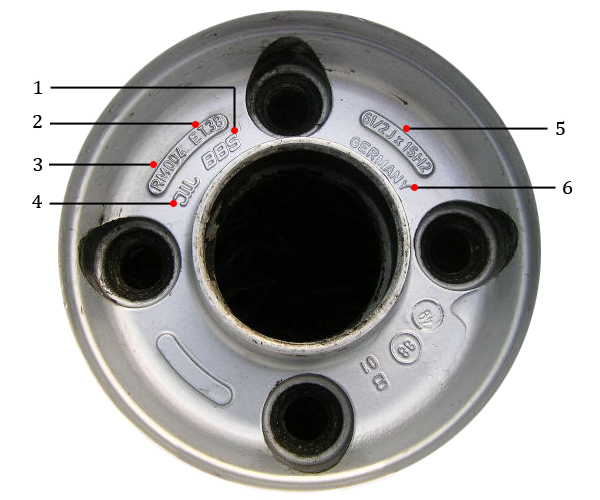
BBS wheel stamp diagram (1: BBS brand, 2: wheel offset, 3: wheel model, 4: JWL standard certification, 5: wheel size, 6: country of manufacture)

== Motorsports ==
BBS has a long history in the world of motorsport, having produced wheels for Formula One, the 24 Hours of Le Mans, IndyCar, DTM, NASCAR, World Touring Car Championship, and other racing series from as early as 1972. The company pioneered technologies in the production of racing wheels and in making wheels lighter and stronger for race usage.

In 2012, BBS Motorsport & Engineering GmbH, the racing division of BBS, became independent under the Japanese Ono Group (Washi Kosan) and moved to Haslach from Schiltach. Production of all BBS forged racing wheels continues in Japan. Japanese company Washibeam Co., Ltd. manufactures the BBS F1 Magnesium wheel and all racing aluminum wheels. Since BBS is a customer of Washibeam, manufacture of the wheel will not be discontinued if BBS goes bankrupt.

The company is the largest supplier of wheels for IndyCar Series and the main supplier of Formula One teams. BBS has also supplied wheels for the NASCAR Cup Series starting in 2022, when the Next Gen car made its debut.

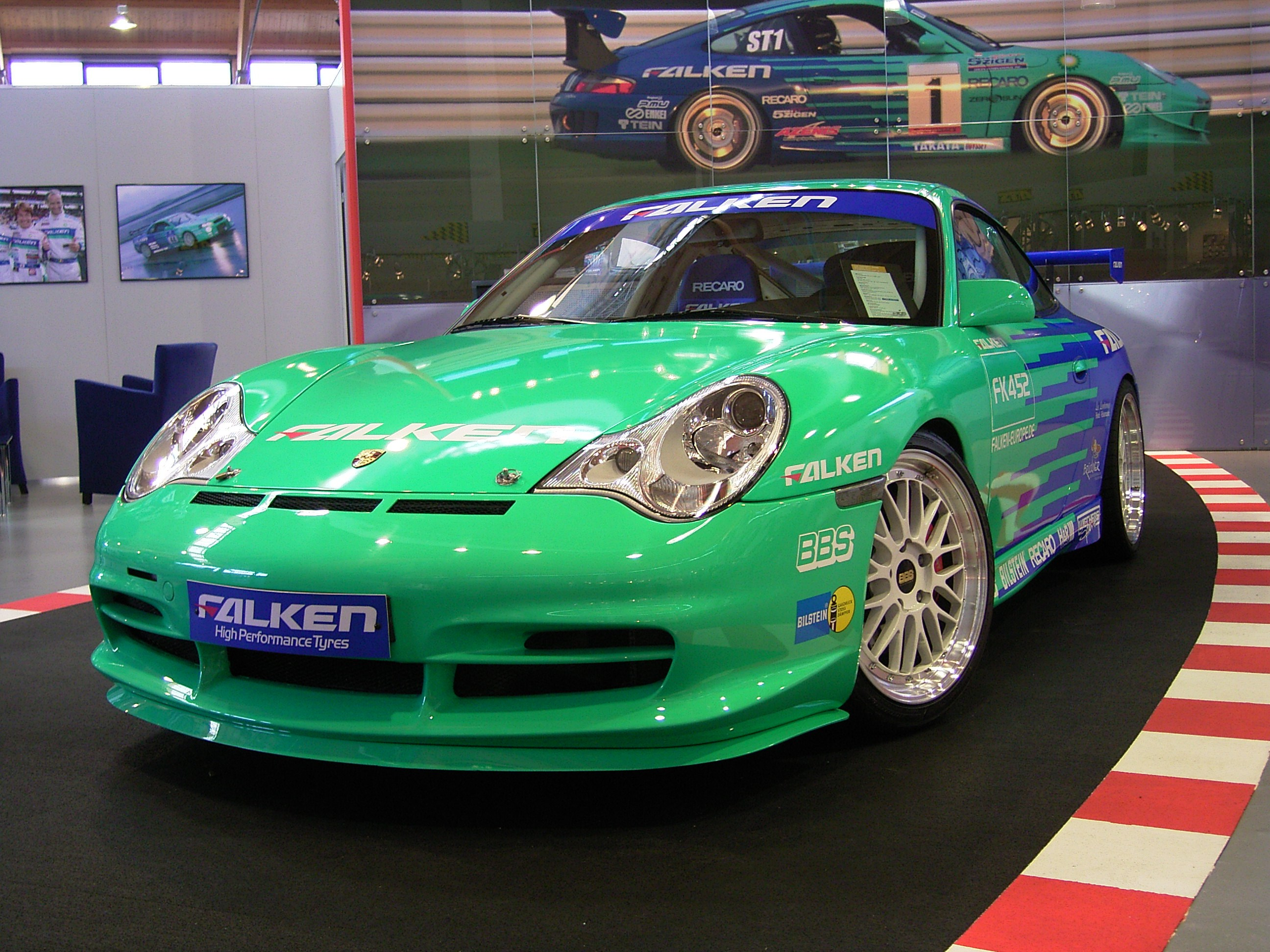
BBS wheels on a Porsche 911 GT3 Cup.

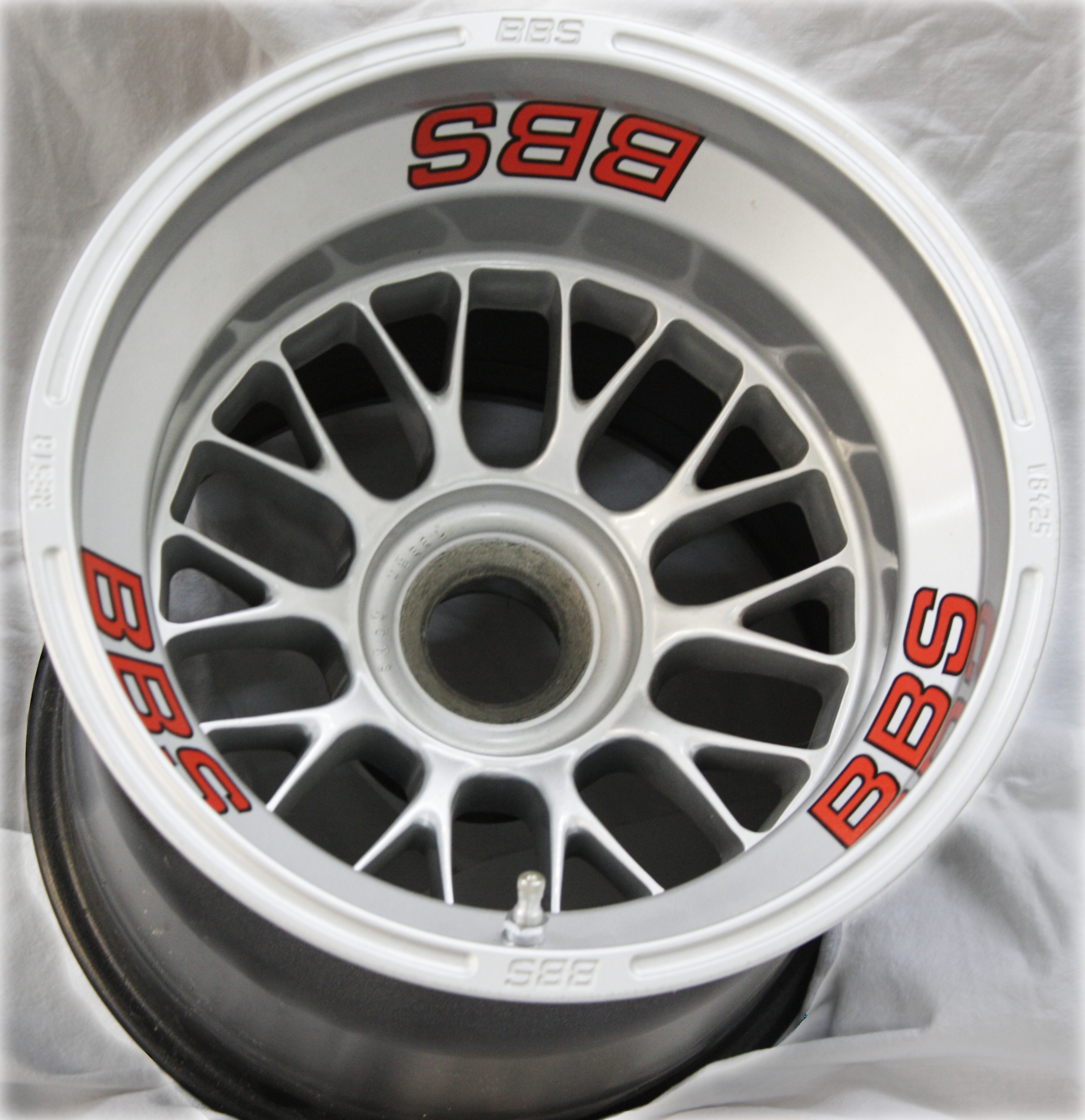
Forged magnesium Formula One racing wheel by BBS.

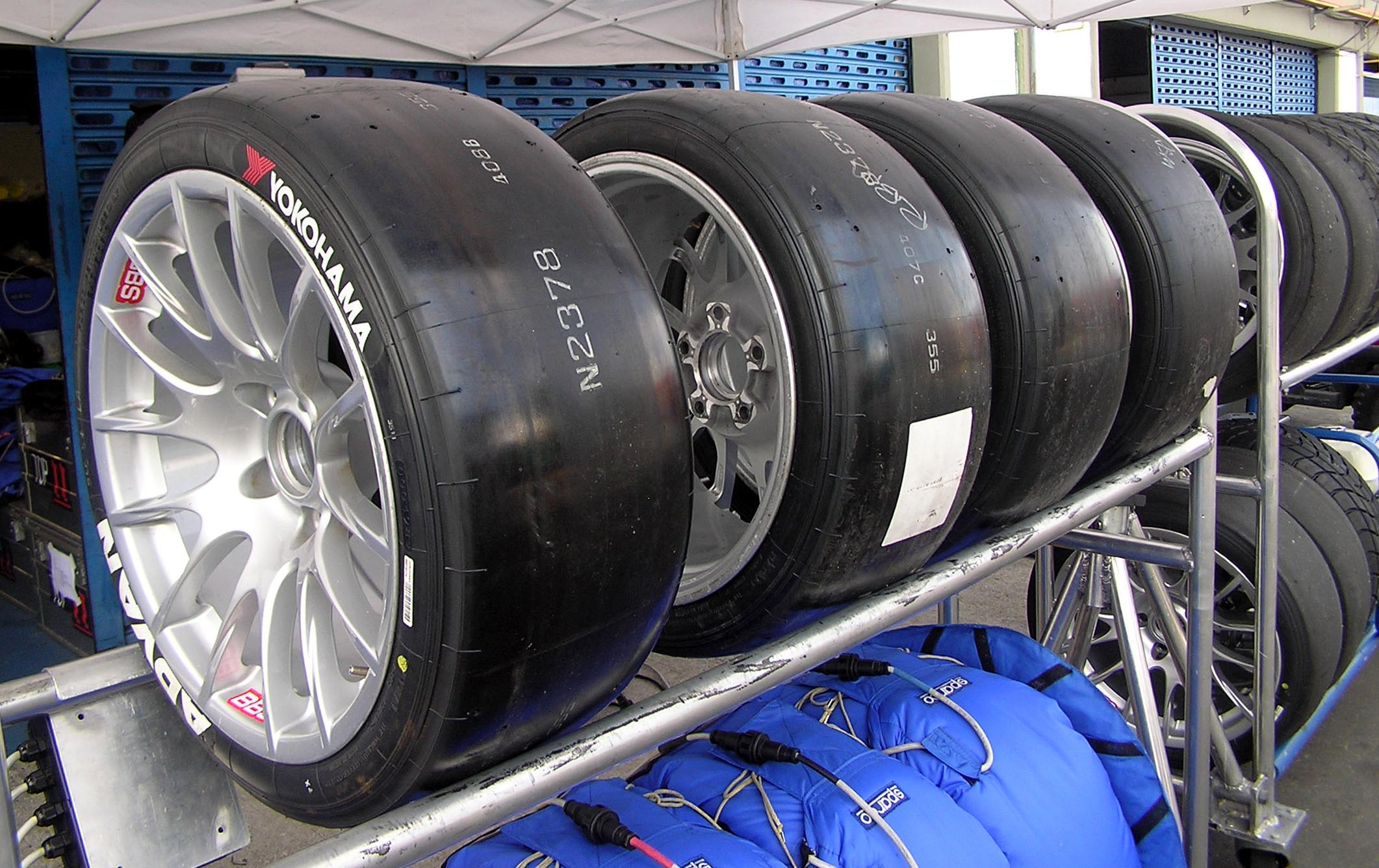
BBS racing wheels for the World Touring Car Championship

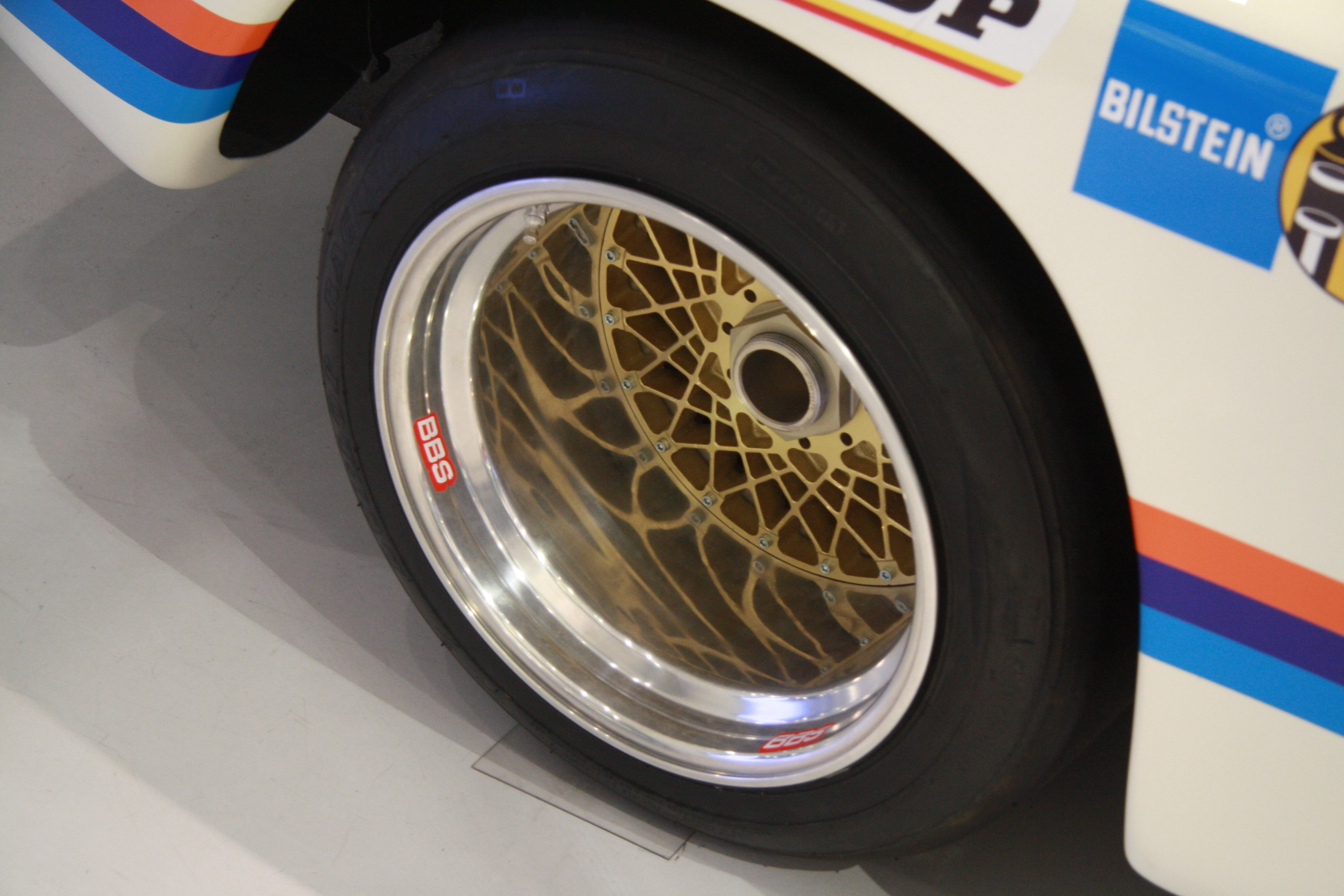
BBS wheel on a BMW 320 Group 5 race car

== OEM applications ==
BBS has and continues to supply OEM wheel applications to a number of automobile brands. In road vehicles, their products can be seen on brands such as BMW, Porsche, Mercedes-Benz, Audi, Ferrari, Maserati, Bentley, Rolls-Royce, Jaguar, Lexus, Infiniti, Toyota, Mitsubishi, Mazda, Renault, Saab, Subaru, Volkswagen, and Volvo.

The highest performance specification of multiple supercars and hypercars, such as the Ferrari 360 Challenge Stradale, Lexus LFA Nürburgring Edition, Porsche 918 Spyder Weissach Package, and Ford GT Heritage Edition all feature specially-made wheels by BBS.

The RS cross-spoke design, which superficially resembles a wire wheel, was common on many European sports cars produced from the 1980s to the early 1990s. This design was noticeably lighter in weight compared to many other styles of the time.

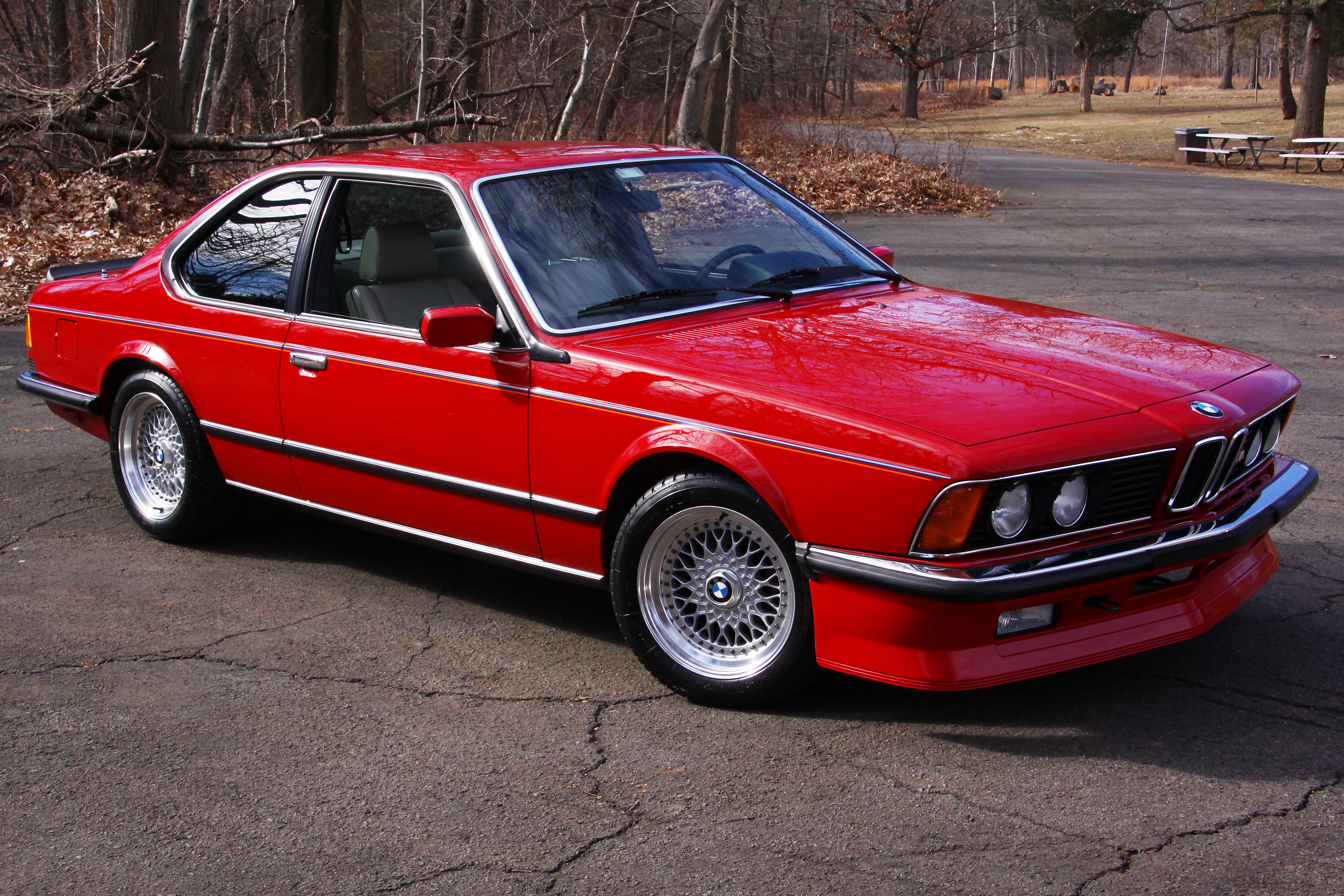
1985 BMW M635CSi with stock BBS RS007 wheels.

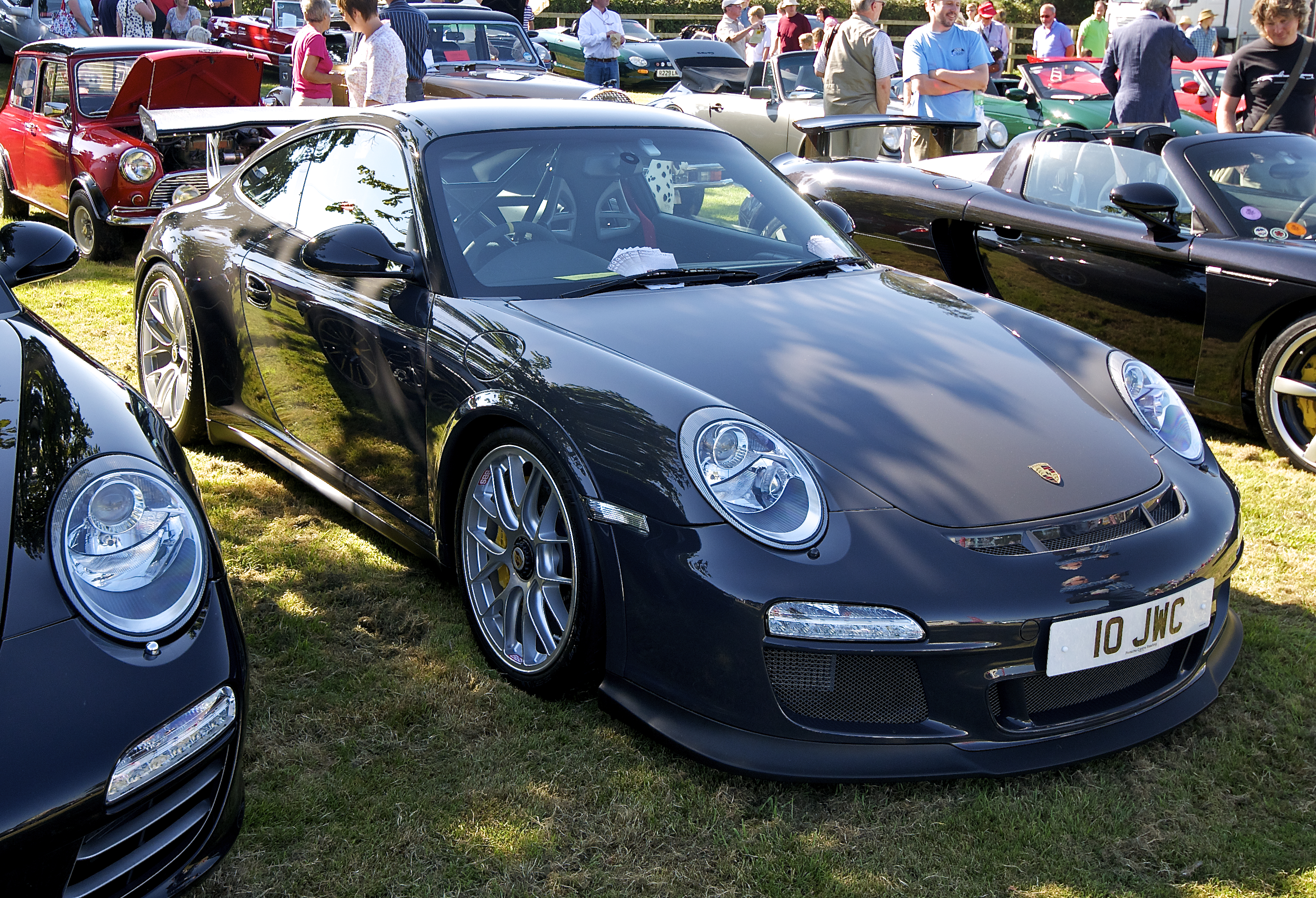
Porsche 911 GT3 RS with OEM BBS centerlock wheels.

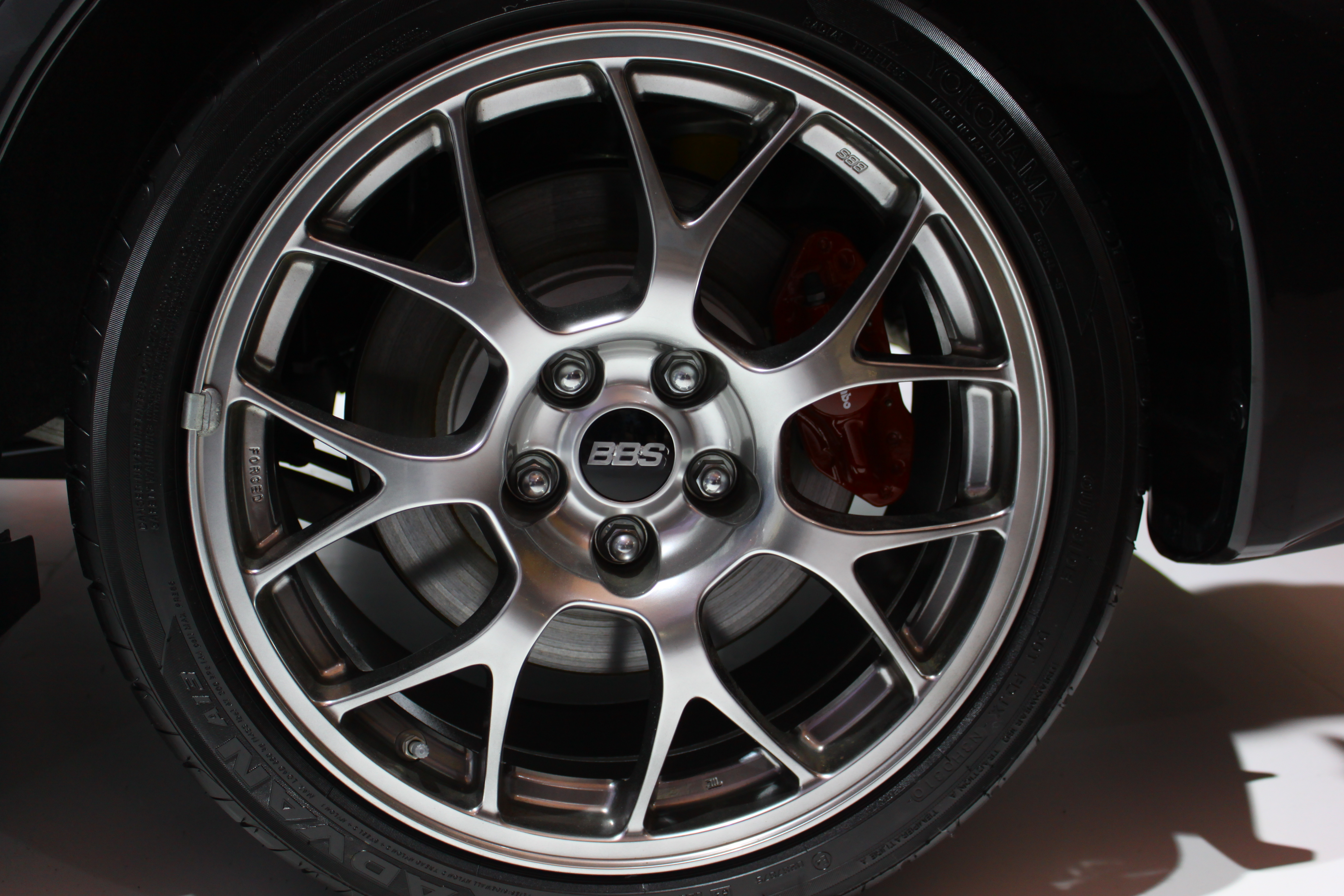
OEM BBS wheel on a Mitsubishi Lancer Evolution X MR.

== Aftermarket ==
With the popularization of BBS wheels in the 1970's by motorsports teams and luxury automobile manufacturers such as BMW and Porsche, the demand for BBS wheels in the aftermarket began to grow.

The three-piece RS released in 1977 was one of the most popular BBS-produced wheels for automobile manufacturers, and soon after became a popular aftermarket wheel which was often replicated by other manufacturers. In 1987, BBS released their first one-piece forged wheel, the RG, based on the same wire-wheel design as the RS. In 1992, the RSII was released, their first two-piece wheel. In 1994, the LM was released, a two-piece wheel based on the design of Le Mans race wheels of the era. In 2011, the RI-D was released, the world's first wheel made of duralumin.

The market of BBS as an aftermarket wheel producer surged in 1983 with the inception of global sales by the company. Rather than selling primarily in Europe, or to OEMs and motorsports teams only, BBS broadened their scope to include sales in the Americas with the founding of BBS of America in 1983, in France with BBS France Co. S.A., and in Japan with BBS Japan Co. Ltd. with partner Washi Beam Co. These companies could then sell not only to their respective domestic automobile manufacturers and motorsports teams, but also to their general regional public.

BBS currently produces the Forged Line, Performance Line, and Design Line of aftermarket wheels. The Forged Line consists of one-, two-, and three-piece die-forged wheels. The Performance Line consists of one-piece flow-formed wheels, while the Design Line consists of one-piece cast wheels. Within these lines, different road and track wheels are focused on either performance design, motorsport design, utility design, or classic design, to offer customers a wheel with specific emphasis on certain characteristics for performance, weight, strength, or aesthetics.

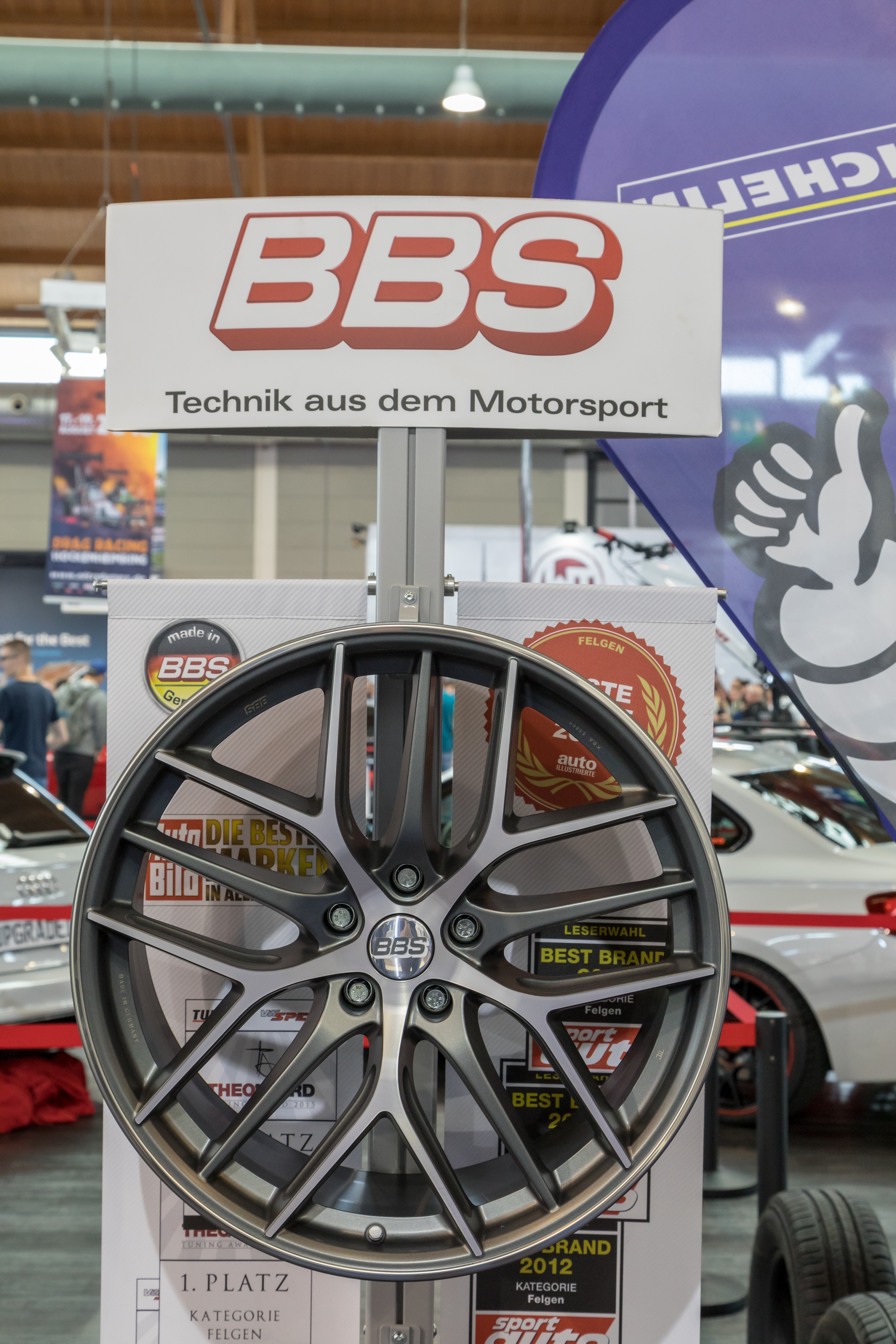
BBS CC-R on display at Tuning World Bodensee 2018

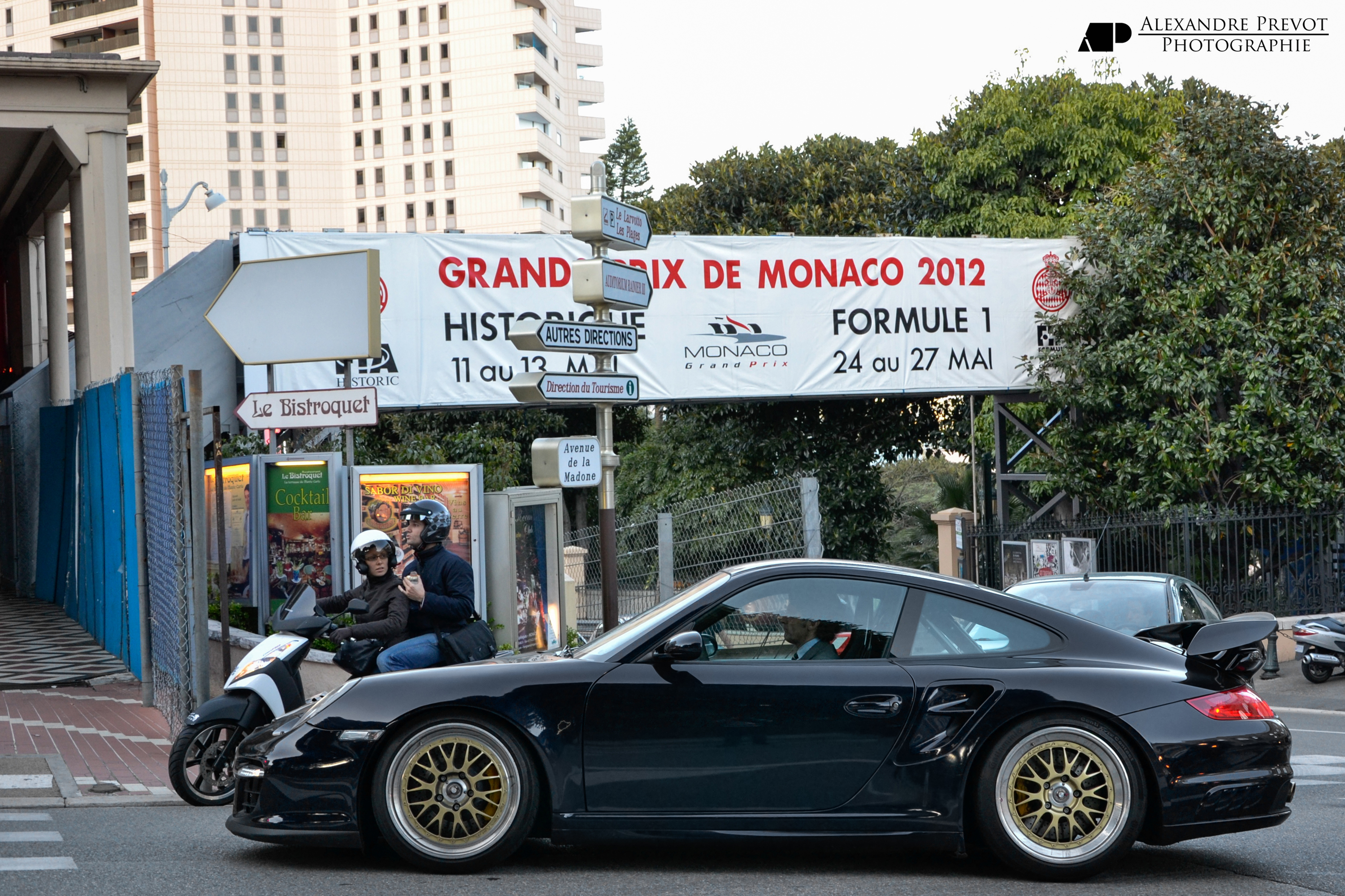
Porsche 911 GT2 (997) with aftermarket BBS E88 wheels

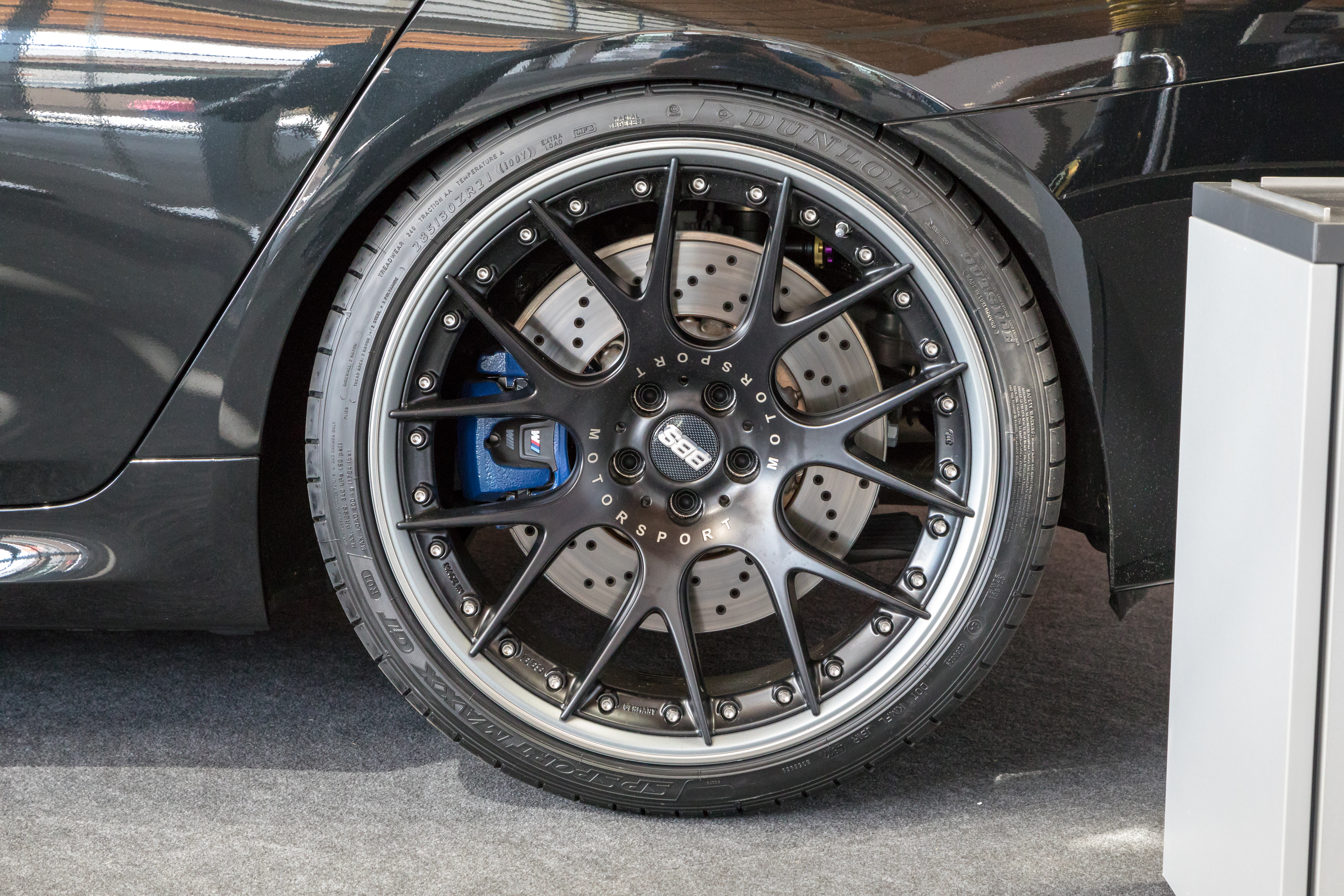
BBS CH-R II wheel on demo vehicle at Tuning World Bodensee 2018

== Gallery ==
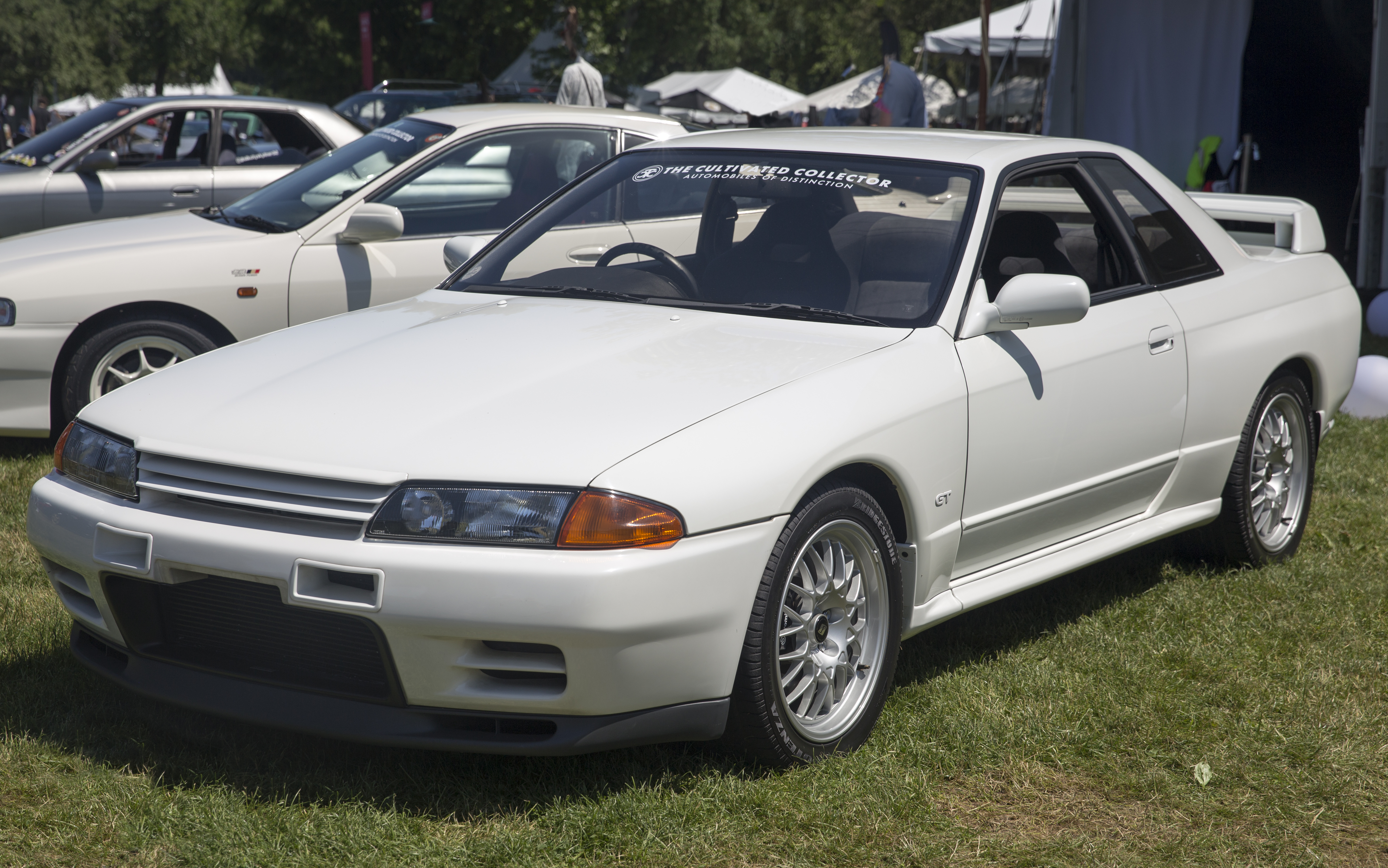

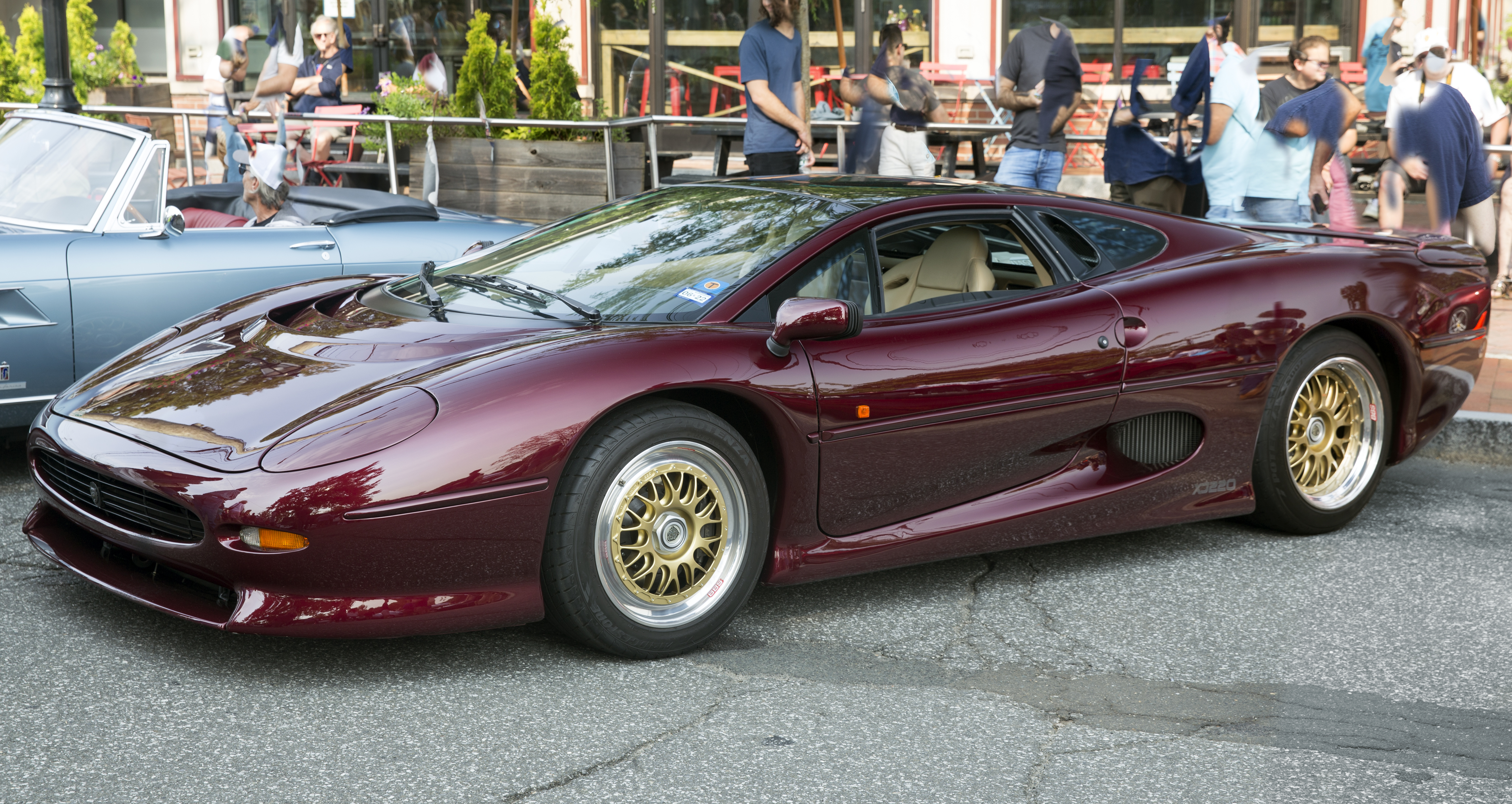

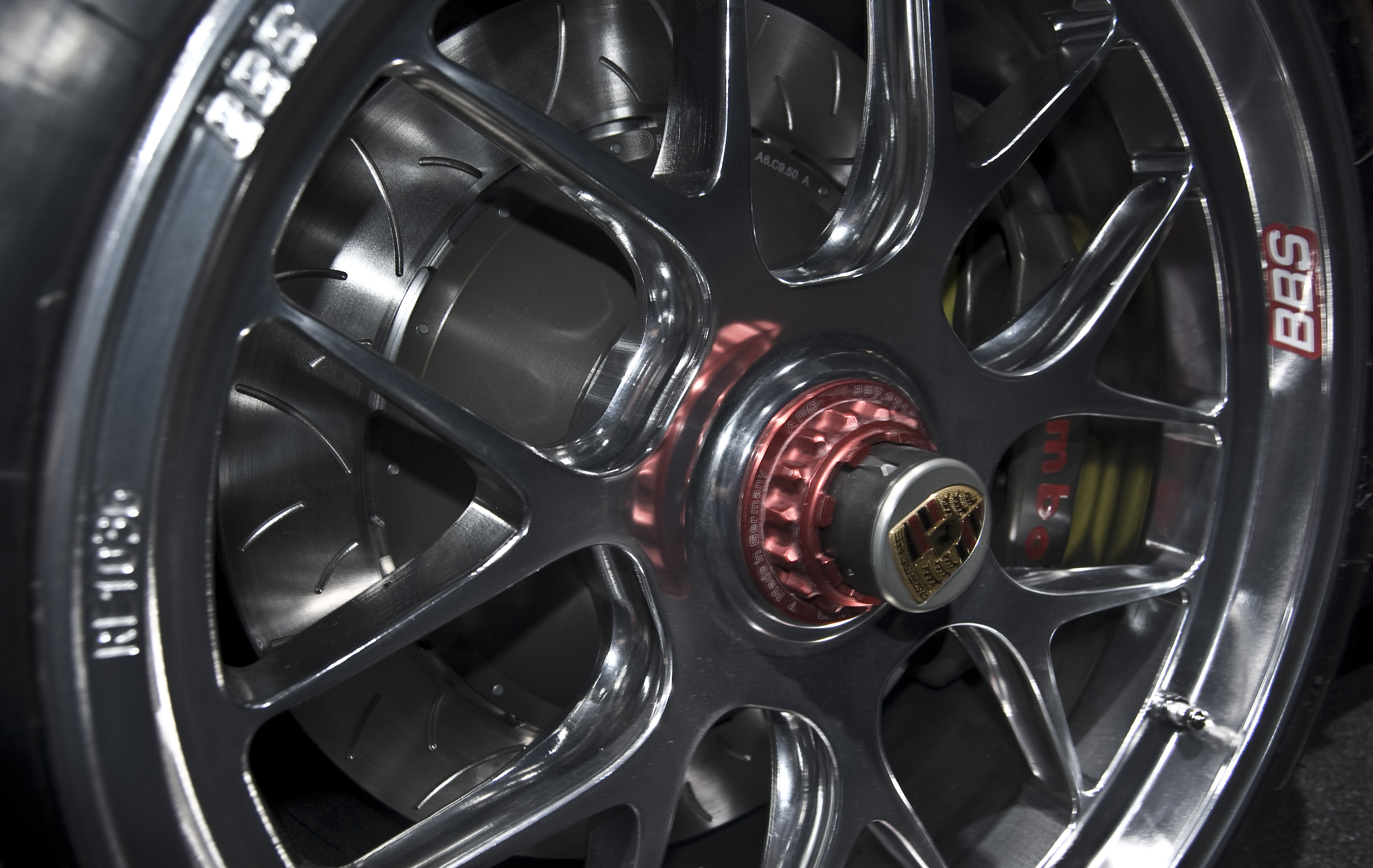

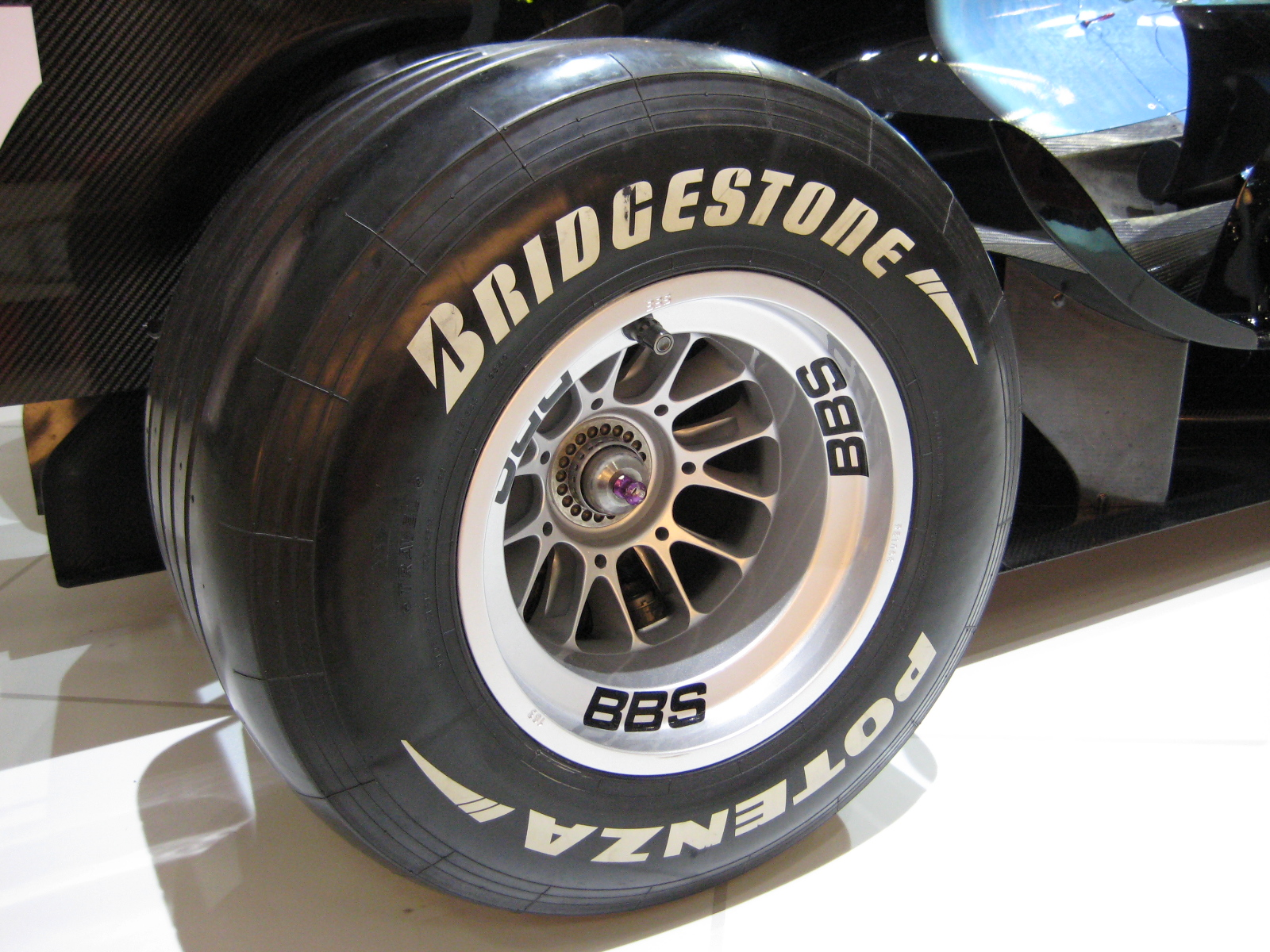

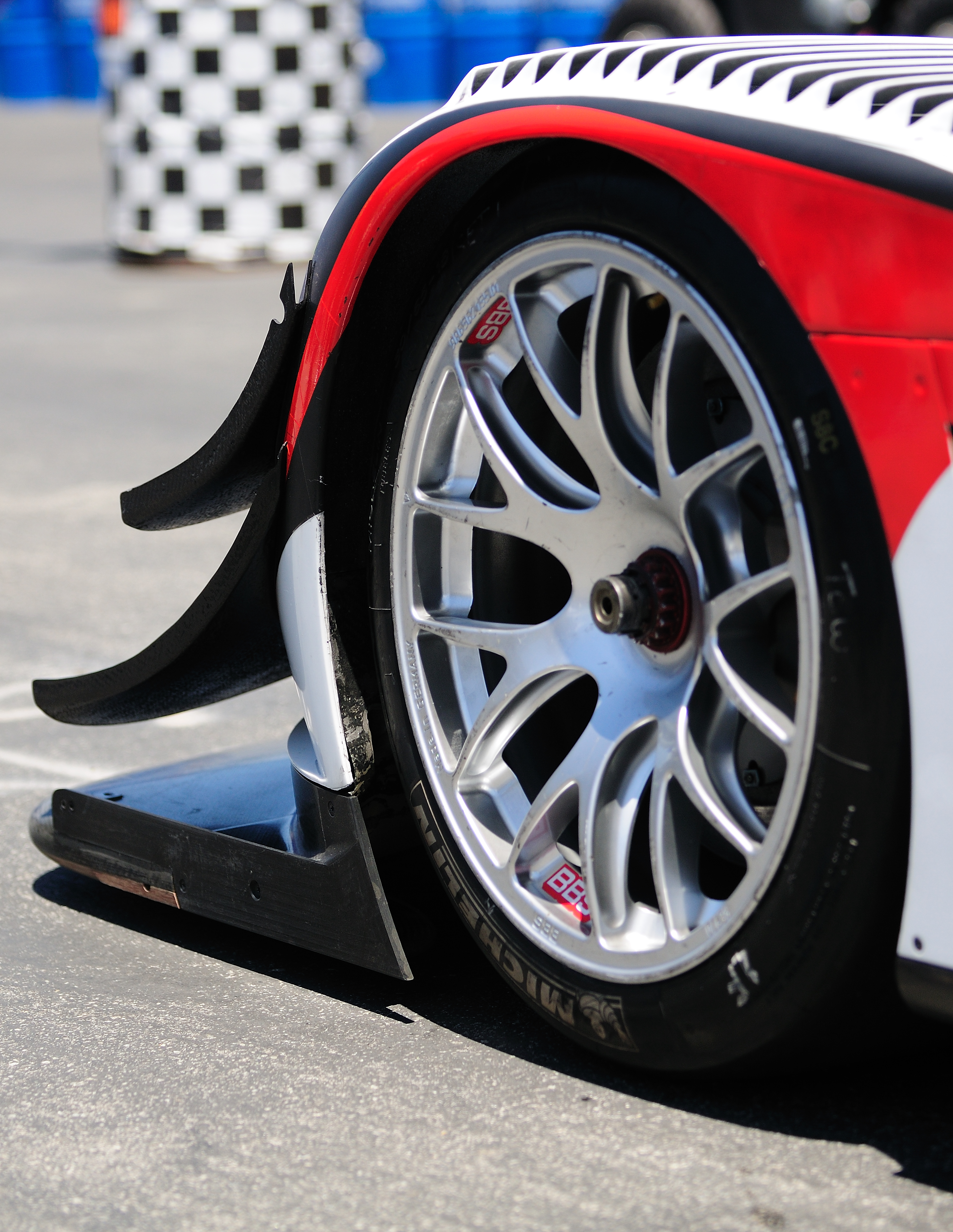
