= D&C =

D&C or D and C or variant, may refer to:

- Dilation and curettage, a medical procedure involving the dilation of the cervix to remove uterine contents
- Divide and conquer algorithm, a strategy for dynamic programming
- Doctrine and Covenants, part of the scripture of the Latter Day Saint movement
- Drill & Ceremony, a term used in the U.S. Army for a method that enables leaders to direct the movement of soldiers in an orderly manner.
- Dennis and Callahan, an American morning radio show
- Democrat and Chronicle, a Rochester, New York, daily newspaper

== See also ==
- Divide and conquer (disambiguation)
- DNC (disambiguation)
- DC (disambiguation)
- D (disambiguation)
- C (disambiguation)
- C&D (disambiguation)
