= Nameplate capacity =

Registered sustainable power output of an industrial facility

Nameplate capacity, also known as the rated capacity, nominal capacity, installed capacity, maximum effect or gross capacity, is the intended full-load sustained output of a facility such as a power station, electric generator, a chemical plant, fuel plant, mine, metal refinery, and many others. Nameplate capacity is the theoretical output registered with authorities for classifying the unit. For intermittent power sources, such as wind and solar, nameplate power is the source's output under ideal conditions, such as maximum usable wind or high sun on a clear summer day.

Capacity factor measures the ratio of actual output over an extended period to nameplate capacity. Power plants with an output consistently near their nameplate capacity have a high capacity factor.

For electric power stations, the power output is expressed in megawatt electrical (MWe). For fuel plants, it is the refinery capacity in barrels per day.

== Power stations ==
=== Dispatchable power ===
For dispatchable power, this capacity depends on the internal technical capability of the plant to maintain output for a reasonable amount of time (for example, a day), neither momentarily nor permanently, and without considering external events such as lack of fuel or internal events such as maintenance. Actual output can be different from nameplate capacity for a number of reasons depending on equipment and circumstances.

=== Non-dispatchable power ===
For non-dispatchable power, particularly renewable energy, nameplate capacity refers to generation under ideal conditions. Output is generally limited by weather conditions, hydroelectric dam water levels, tidal variations and other outside forces. Equipment failures and maintenance usually contribute less to capacity factor reduction than the innate variation of the power source. In photovoltaics, capacity is rated under Standard Test Conditions usually expressed as watt-peak (W_{p}). In addition, a PV system's nameplate capacity is sometimes denoted by a subindex, for example, MW_{DC} or MW_{AC}, to identify the raw DC power or converted AC power output.

=== Generator capacity ===
Diagram of a turbo-electric COGES power-plant, with power-consuming pump

The term is connected with nameplates on electrical generators as these plates describing the model name and manufacturer usually also contain the rated output, but the rated output of a power station to the electrical grid is invariably less than the generator nameplate capacity, because the components connecting the actual generator to the grid also use power. Thus there is a distinction between component capacity and facility capacity.

== See also ==
- Availability factor
- Declared net capacity (power plants)
- Electricity generation
- Intermittent power source § Terminology
- List of energy storage projects
