= The Best of Astounding: Classic Short Novels from the Golden Age of Science Fiction =

- Cover of first edition
- Author: edited by James Gunn
- Cover artist: Tony Greco
- Language: English
- Genre: Science fiction
- Publisher: Carroll & Graf
- Publication date: 1992
- Publication place: United States
- Media type: Print (hardcover)
- Pages: x, 438 pp.
- ISBN: 0-88184-808-5

The Best of Astounding: Classic Short Novels from the Golden Age of Science Fiction is an anthology of science fiction short works edited by James Gunn. It was first published in hardcover by Carroll & Graf in August 1992.

The book collects six novels, novellas and novelettes by various science fiction authors that were originally published in the 1930s-1950s in the science fiction magazine Astounding, together with an introduction by Poul Anderson.

== Contents ==
- "Introduction" (Poul Anderson)
- "Sucker Bait" (Isaac Asimov)
- "The Stolen Dormouse" (L. Sprague de Camp)
- "The Fifth-Dimension Tube" (Murray Leinster)
- "The Shadow Out of Time" (H. P. Lovecraft)
- "Bindlestiff" (James Blish)
- "We Have Fed Our Sea" (Poul Anderson)
