= Ishtehari =

Pakistani police term for a person with a criminal record

Ishtehari (Urdu:اشتہاری English: Proclaimed offender) is a Pakistani police term for a person with a criminal record. They are demanded by the police in offences such as murder, dacoity, robbery, and rape and all other offenses. When the accused person does not come before the court, the police get a proclaimed Offender Order from a magistrate.

== See also ==
- Chargesheet
- History-sheeter
