= Divide and conquer (disambiguation) =

Divide and conquer or divide and rule (Latin: divide et impera) is a method for gaining and maintaining power in politics and sociology.

Divide and conquer or divide and rule may also refer to:

== Arts and entertainment ==
=== Film ===
- Divide and Conquer (film), a 1943 propaganda film
- Divide and Conquer: The Story of Roger Ailes, a 2018 American documentary

=== Literature ===
- Divide and Rule (collection), two science fiction novellas by L. Sprague de Camp, 1948
  - Divide and Rule (novella), 1939
- Divide and Rule: The Partition of Africa, 1880–1914, a 1991 history book by Henk Wesseling

=== Music ===
- Divide and Conquer (album), by Suicidal Angels, 2014
- "Divide and Conquer", a song by Hüsker Dü from the 1985 album Flip Your Wig
- "Divide and Conquer", a song by Story of the Year from the 2003 album Page Avenue
- "Divide and Conquer", a song by IDLES from the 2017 album Brutalism

=== Television episodes ===
- "Divide and Conquer" (Inhumans), 2017
- "Divide and Conquer" (Stargate SG-1), 2001
- "Divide and Conquer" (Teen Titans), 2003
- "Divide and Conquer" (Teenage Mutant Ninja Turtles episode), 1996
- "Divide and Conquer" (Transformers episode), 1984
- "Divide and Conquer" (Yu-Gi-Oh! Capsule Monsters episode), 2006
- "Divide and Rule" (Borgen), 2010
- "Divide and Conquer", an episode of Gangland (TV series), 2009
- "Divide" and "Conquer", two episodes of Star vs. the Forces of Evil, 2018
- "Divide and Conquer", an episode of W.I.T.C.H., 2005

== Other uses ==
- Defeat in detail, or divide and conquer, a military tactic
- Divide-and-conquer algorithm, in computer science
- Divide-and-conquer eigenvalue algorithm, in mathematics
- Divide and conquer algorithm for matrix multiplication, in mathematics

== See also ==
- Divide and choose, a procedure for fair division of a continuous resource
