= History-sheeter =

Person with a long criminal record

In Indian English, a history-sheeter (sometimes referred to as a rowdy-sheeter ) is a person with a long criminal record. Known as a career criminal outside of South Asia, the term is found in newspapers of South Asian countries such as India and Pakistan.

According to Anastasia Piliavsky, the concept of "history sheeter" has origins in the colonial era rule and its police surveillance codes. The legal codes allowed preemptive penalties against those listed as a "history sheeter", and these codes were copied into the post-independent Indian Penal Code Sections 109 and 110. The Indian states such as Rajasthan list a person as a "history sheeter" when "his or her criminal record reaches or exceeds thirty offenses," states Piliavsky.

History-sheeter is a broad term that refers to people who have been registered onto a history sheet which can include those who have a history of criminal activities or people who are considered to be a threat to society. This term is most commonly used in India. These history sheets can include a description of where a certain individual has been, a description of their features, jobs, previous crimes and the person’s relationships or connections.

There are two categories of history-sheeters: Class-A history-sheeters are those who are "less hardened criminals", whereas Class-B history-sheeters are those who are "professional criminals... dangerous persons and abettors". The local police officers oversee the regulation of these history sheets and are in control of the decision on whether to register somebody, meaning that many people who lack convictions are on a history sheet simply because an officer considers them to be suspicious.

These history-sheeters are subject to many policies such as the restriction of movement and police surveillance in order to ensure that further criminal activity does not occur, and they are often “treated as social outcasts”. Mrinal Satish describes the nature of the police surveillance of history-sheeters as being constant and not being confined to the specific area they were registered, as information on the individual is passed on to the relevant station if they were to move. These specific policies put in place to deal with these history-sheeters has many implications for both the individuals and the prevalence of crime in contemporary India.

The origin of the concept of history-sheeters can be seen in the British colonial understanding that nomadic lifestyles were difficult to maintain control over, and their efforts to subsequently repress these lifestyles led to the criminalisation of certain groups known as criminal tribes. The subsequent maintenance of these ideas following the independence of India in 1947, saw that the methods used for these criminal tribes were carried over to deal with crime in post-colonial India. These colonial origins help bring into perspective how the term history-sheeters entered the current Indian lexicon and how these policies entered its contemporary systems.

== Origins ==
The origin of the term history-sheeter can be traced back to British colonial rule in India. The conception of the classification of people as a history-sheeter can be seen in their efforts to suppress the way in which the lifestyle of nomadic groups “did not fit the “civilised” mould that the colonial rulers were familiar with”, especially regarding problems the colonial rulers had with collecting taxes and administrating policing.

From the outset, there was a degree of profiling utilised when identifying who may be classified as a history-sheeter, the Criminal Tribes Act of 1871 particularly showcases this concept. The Act was guised under the effort to reduce the prevalence of crime, but it was rooted in the ideas that people in a certain caste or group were inherently more inclined to crime. The act grouped these ‘criminally minded’ people into criminal tribes, who were to be surveyed and whose movement should be restricted, essentially suppressing the traditional nomadic lifestyles of many groups in India.

Therefore, in order to deal with this unique, hereditary type of criminality, there was increased significance placed on the police to maintain “pre-emptive surveillance” regardless of the presence of any suspicious behaviour.

The Criminal Tribes Act recognised the difficulties of surveying all the people that were considered to be a part of a ‘criminal tribe’, therefore there was a violent punishment sentiment that seemed to permeate the strategies for limiting the of these ‘criminals’, as it was seen as a prime way to instil fear in order to ensure that crime would not continue. This act went through amendments in 1911 and 1924 before it was formally repealed in 1952.

Following the independence of India from British colonial rule, the Habitual Offenders Act of 1952 was able to rid itself of the classification of certain groups as criminals, but it did retain some of the aspects of the Criminal Tribes Act. The Habitual Offenders Act regulated the activities of those who are labelled as ‘habitual offenders’, which can be described as those who have been sentenced to imprisonment more than twice in a period of five years or has been imprisoned for a total of 12 months.

Additionally, those groups that were considered to be a ‘criminal tribe’ under the Criminal Tribes Act were to be known as denotified tribes under the new Habitual Offenders Act. Under this act, these habitual offenders experienced the restriction of movement similar to those who were considered to be a part of a criminal tribe in colonial India.

Moreover, the police were given additional powers in order to limit the activities of these habitual offenders such as the “power to take finger impressions, photographs and foot-prints at any time”, and for these people to be registered in order to maintain the ability to effectively monitor their activities.

The policies put in place for these habitual offenders directly reflect the restrictions placed on those who are labelled as history-sheeters. Indian legislation like the Criminal Tribes Act and the Habitual Offenders Act have shaped how history-sheeters have been viewed and managed in contemporary India.

== Policies ==
The policies surrounding history-sheeters range from surveillance to the scrupulous attention to the up-keeping of records. These policies occur on various levels of society and they work with the goal of limiting the prevalence of crime and hope to ensure that criminally inclined individuals do not continue to commit crimes and do not become a habitual offender. Surveillance techniques such as monitoring, and restriction of movement are key methods in which these history-sheeters are managed. The reporting of activities is not only done by the police officers in the community but the community itself too.

The community plays a key role in the creation of a history-sheet for a person, as lodgements of complaints, and the opinions on a person’s “habits and general reputation” works in conjunction with the actual convictions of an individual and oversight of the court. History-sheets can also be created if an individual is arrested repeatedly, many of which tend to be made as preventative arrests, which is made possible due to the police’s ability to make these arrests without the authority of a magistrate.

These complaints and reports all contribute to the decision to create a history-sheet and once opened it gets recorded into the relevant Village Crime Diary, where an officer is specifically dedicated in updating this diary. The history sheet of an individual will remain open and in the Village Crime Diary until death, which is different to the policies surrounding convicts without a history-sheet whose names are “removed from this part of diary on expiry of twenty years from his conviction”.

It is further seen that the activities of surveillance get reported onto their file, and this information can be passed on if they were to move out of their area; the police would simply transfer the information to the other officers in the area they have moved to, which is another key feature of the Village Crime Diary. History-sheets also get recorded on the Crime and Criminal Tracking Network System (CCTNS) which is a database in which these history-sheets/records and other criminal records get further centrally uploaded on a national scale.

Further, history-sheeters are considered to be suspects when a crime has occurred. Those history-sheeters who live in the area of the crime are brought in for interrogation, where the threat of violence and the occurrence of violence such as a slap or a kick is occasionally used to receive a confession.

Preventative arrests also took place as a way to limit the occurrence of crime in India, for example in Mumbai alone, there were 15,738 preventative arrests in 2005, showing the prevalence of prevention as a motivation for these arrests that rather than arrests being made once somebody is found guilty of a crime. This is seen to be enshrined in Indian Law, as history-sheeters who are considered “antisocial elements… can be taken into police custody in anticipation of a possible problem”.

Surveillance is also seen as a key deterrent for crime, specifically the fear of it, which is enacted through the construction of non-uniformed shadow teams to ‘watch over’ history-sheeters to limit the possibility that crime could occur. Bhadauria has detailed another range of surveillance techniques used for history-sheeters such as the “secret picketing of the house or approaches to the house of suspects” or “periodical inquiries” regarding personal details of the history-sheeter. These policies aim to reduce the prevalence of crime within India, specifically in targeting history-sheeters.

== Impact ==
Academics have signalled how these policies that surround history-sheeters that work towards reducing the prevalence of crime have had an impact on their lives and Indian society generally. These policies can lead to the "profiling, discrimination, stigmatisation... (and) may result in lifetime suspicion" for history-sheeters. The ease in which a history-sheet is created for an individual poses a host of problems, specifically with regard to how history-sheeters are treated within Indian society. There are many instances which the creation of a history-sheet is done with ulterior motives such as those who use it to target their opponents, whether it be a personal or political opponent. Moreover, the way in which history-sheeters are labelled as 'anti-social elements' and targeted as a suspect when a crime occurs greatly disrupts the lives of history-sheeters, as seen in how "in Maharashtra preventive arrests can exceed the stipulated period of 24 hours and easily last up to two weeks."

These arrests often occur without much evidence or reasoning behind them and has resulted in complaints regarding false preventive arrests to the National Human Rights Commission in Delhi. This in turn frames the role of the police as "protecting peace... and protecting the status quo" rather than the enforcers of law, which as can lead to the and has resulted in resistance to change these systems despite its potential ineffectiveness.

Bhadauria has made alluded for the need for there to be a change in the way that police approach the surveillance of history-sheeters to allow for better rehabilitation and correction of criminal activity in a way that does not evoke a defiant response from history-sheeters. Moreover, Satish highlights the discrimination towards history-sheeters in aspects such as housing and employment opportunities, specifically with regard to private employment and enterprises.

Evidently, domestic servants in India are to be registered with a police station in order for background checks to be run, which includes checking for any criminal antecedents, which could include prior preventive arrests, if any criminal antecedents are found this is reported to employers which usually results in the firing of these domestic servants.

The lack of any legal protection against the discrimination of people with criminal antecedents within Indian courts means that there is the possibility that "if bye-laws of a housing society state that shares cannot be sold to anyone who has ever been arrested or to someone whose is on a surveillance database... their action would be valid". There have also been concerned raised about the privacy concerns for the individuals in Indian society surrounding these policies of surveillance and recording into databases, and can weaken democracy.

Further, 23% of deaths that occurred during police custody between 1980 and 1997 in Delhi were arrested without an alleged offence and 62% were those accused of petty crimes like theft, showing the violence that history-sheeters are subjugated to with the frequent preventive arrests and the specific surveillance of history-sheeters that are enacted in the hopes of reducing crimes.

== See also ==
- Dossier criminal
- Ishtehari
- Habitual offender
