= Excelsior Scholarship =

New York State's Excelsior Scholarship program provides certain residents with free tuition for full-time study at its state universities: State University of New York (SUNY) and City University of New York (CUNY). On April 11, 2017, New York became the first American state to make four-year public colleges tuition-free for those under an earnings threshold.

== Scholarship ==
New York State's Excelsior Scholarship provides in-state, public college tuition for residents whose families earn below a set annual income cap: $100,000 in 2017. This amounts to an annual savings between $4,000 and $6,500, depending on whether the student attends a community college or a four-year school. As the scholarship only covers tuition, students bear the additional cost of fees and room and board, which can cost up to $14,000 annually. To maintain the scholarship, Excelsior students must maintain 30 annual class credits at a state college: State University of New York (SUNY) or City University of New York (CUNY). There will also be a GPA requirement. After graduation, Excelsior students must live and work in New York for as many years as they received the scholarship.

The annual income cap will increase as the Excelsior program is phased in (to $110,000 in 2018, and $125,000 in 2019). By the time the program is fully implemented, an estimated 200,000 will be eligible.

== Criticism ==
The Excelsior Scholarship requires graduates to live and work in New York state for the number of years that they received the scholarship, which Sara Goldrick-Raab, among others, say will cost New York and scholarship recipients money and is fundamentally unfair. Senator Bernie Sanders praised the program as an example of the free college programs he supports but some in the free college movement say that it falls into the same trap as existing scholarship programs in being complicated and trapping recipients. In addition, the Excelsior Scholarship pays for only tuition and so has been assailed for not helping poorer students who can't afford books or living expenses. The Excelsior Scholarship is a "last dollar" scholarship, meaning that Federal aid and grants will be applied first, with the Excelsior Scholarship being applied to the remaining balance.

Marc J Cohen and the Student Assembly of the State University of New York have commended the program as one which will provide greater access to an affordable higher education, but have also articulated concerns that there are many other associated costs to higher education which must be addressed.

As of 2012, only 25.9% of CUNY students graduate with a bachelors within 4 years, as required by the Excelsior Scholarship, according to the CUNY Office of Institutional Research and Assessment. 48.9% of State University of New York students graduate with a bachelors within 4 years.

If students do not fulfill the work requirements, or fail to meet academic requirements the amount of scholarship funding they received will be converted into a loan.

The New York Times estimated that the program's requirement for finishing in two to four years, depending on the degree, would make more than 90% of community college students and 60% of four-year college students ineligible.
