= Divide and Rule (collection) =

1948 collection of science fiction novellas by L. Sprague de Camp

- Cover of the first edition.
- Author: L. Sprague de Camp
- Cover artist: A.J. Donnell
- Language: English
- Genre: Science fiction
- Publisher: Fantasy Press
- Publication date: 1948
- Publication place: United States
- Media type: Print (hardback)
- Pages: ix, 231

Divide and Rule is a 1948 collection of two science fiction novellas by American writer L. Sprague de Camp, first published in hardcover by Fantasy Press, and later reissued in paperback by Lancer Books in 1964. The collected pieces were previously published in 1939 and 1941 in the magazines Unknown and Astounding. The first stand-alone edition of the title story was published as a large-print hardcover by Thorndike Press in September 2003. An E-book edition of the title story was issued by Gollancz's SF Gateway imprint on September 29, 2011 as part of a general release of de Camp's works in electronic form.

The stories in the collection both postulate futures in which Earth has reverted to feudalism, in one instance by the dictate of alien invaders and in the other as a result of the accumulation of excessive power by corporations.

== Contents ==
- "Divide and Rule"
- "The Stolen Dormouse"

== Reception ==
John K. Aiken, writing in Fantasy Review, rates de Camp "very nearly at his best" in the two stories making up the collection, and his best as "very good indeed." He considers them "[a]ltogether, as sprightly and enjoyable a pair of tales as one might meet in a couple of years' reading." He appreciates the basis of de Camp's science fiction "in the behaviour of real people living in unfamiliar social set-ups, logically developed from to-day's trends or from a given premise." He does feel "that Mr. de Camp's sense of humour [can] sometimes run away with him," as in "the extremely improbable details of the feudal regime set up by the Hoppers in 'Divide and Rule,' ... but improbability is here outweighed by entertainment value and by a certain wild consistency which is supported by the reality of the characters." His primary criticism of the title story is of a "scientific flaw" he perceives in the gimmick that provides the resolution. He considers "The Stolen Dormouse... more solidly based," but nonetheless singles out for praise "the description of the hero's wedding night, spent under his wife's bed in the company of a tame puma and in the throes of hay fever."

Astounding reviewer P. Schuyler Miller praised the book for "provid[ing] more sheer entertainment than any the fantasy publishers have yet given us," noting that de Camp uses his "detailed knowledge of history" to depict "hypothetical future societies which ape those of the past--with differences."

Sam Moskowitz saw the influence of Mark Twain in the title story. Calling de Camp "the funniest writer in science fiction," he noted that "[t]hough the writing was choppy in spots, the details of an utterly unique social set-up, complete with its own slang, was engrossingly worked out and chuckle-provoking."

William Mattathias Robins calls the title piece "a story of the awakening of political consciousness [in which] Sir Howard progresses from viewing all his relationships in terms of class divisions to respecting people for their merit as individuals," and the second story one "which traces a boy's transition to manhood, his developing political awareness, and his winning of his heart's desire." He finds "the two stories ... appropriately linked because [each] takes place in the future, with an aristocratic social milieu."

According to Earl Terry Kemp "[t]his book ... shows de Camp's pre-war work at its best, [and] was a landmark in integrating adventure into the society out of which it arises." He feels the author "has played with the forces that form a society in a very amusing way which shows considerable sociological insight" and that "[a]s is frequently the case with de Camp's work, the ideas behind the story are even more interesting than the stories themselves. De Camp's work is a sort of Lewis Carroll nonsense-made-sensible--and that phrase best describes the two novellas in this book."
