= Dossier criminal =

Term used by Indian police forces

Dossier Criminal (DC) is a term used extensively in the Indian Police forces for the classification of criminals. A dossier criminal is a person who has committed specific crimes across police circles or sub-divisions. In most cases, a DC would have already been in the Known Depredator (KD) list maintained at every police station as part of the Station Diary. Radha Kumar summarised that at least in Madras, the KD designation was formally reserved for certain offences under the Indian Penal Code 1860 and other statutes, but in practice was applied loosely to justify more extensive police surveillance, and eventually passed into common usage in Tamil to refer to any real or suspected criminal behaviour.

== See also ==
- History-sheeter
