= Dore Numa College =

Secondary school in Warri, Nigeria

Coordinates: 5.5076°N 5.7624°E

Information
- Motto: Hardwork Is Success
- Established: October 1980; 45 years ago

Dore Numa College is a government-owned secondary school in Warri, Delta State, Nigeria. It is a day school named after Chief Dore Numa. It was established in October 1980 to provide secondary education for children and its motto is "Hardwork Is Success".

In June 2013, during the administration of Governor Emmanuel Uduaghan, Dore Numa College was one of the schools inspected by the Delta State Governor, who decried vandalisation of government projects in the newly constructed schools.

In December 2021, it was reported that there was a cult clash between some Dore Numa College students and other students who came from different schools in the area. A female student of Dore Numa College named Sharon Taiwo was also a victim of human trafficking and was assisted financially by the Delta State Governor's wife, Mrs. Dame Edith Okowa.

== Notable alumni ==
- Anderson Esiti, Nigerian footballer
