= Declared net capacity =

Declared net capacity (DNC) is a measure of the contribution that a power station makes to the overall capacity of a distribution grid. It is measured in megawatts (MW), or in megawatts electrical (MWe) for a thermal power station.

DNC is sometimes expanded as developed net capacity in British English; The two expansions have exactly the same meaning.

In a conventional power station, the DNC rating is simply the maximum rated output minus the power consumed onsite. It is sometimes termed the switchyard output, and takes no account of transmission losses in the grid, which may be considerable in the case of a remote hydro station for example. Most but not all quoted power station ratings are DNC ratings rather than the simple capacity of the alternators.

In the case of a wind power station, the situation is more complex. The alternator of a wind turbine is normally specified to match the strongest wind in which the turbine is designed to operate. This is because most of the cost of a wind turbine is in the rotor and the tower and bearings that support it, rather than in the alternator. It makes no economic sense to restrict the size of the alternator to anything less than the maximum that the rotor will deliver. However, this means that, unlike a conventional power station, a wind turbine rarely achieves its maximum rated output while operating.

While for conventional power stations, the station is only regarded as available if the full power output is achievable, for wind power stations no power at all may be available depending on the wind strength, and even if a turbine is operating it may be producing as little as a tenth of its maximum rated capacity. A typical average figure is between one-third and one-half of the maximum rated capacity.

There are several suggested methods of allowing for this when quoting a DNC figure for a wind farm, but none has gained general acceptance, and the capacity quoted for a wind farm is normally a simple total of the maximum rated capacities of the turbines, sometimes termed the peak capacity. Many wind schemes now also quote their expected or actual annual output in GWh, to allow more meaningful comparisons with other forms of generation than is possible just by considering this total rated output.

== See also ==
- Availability factor
- Capacity factor
