= Single-piece wheel manufacturing =

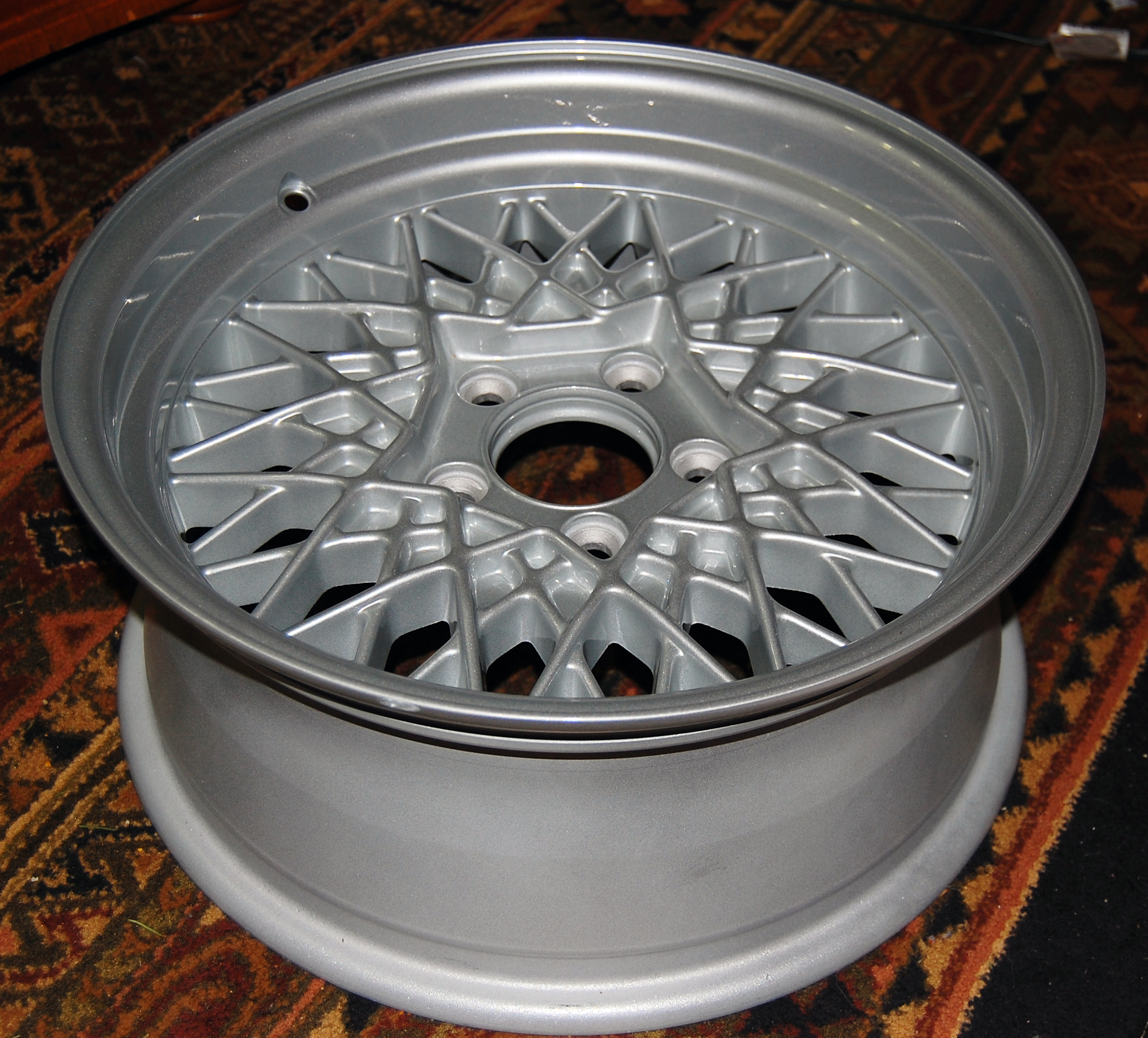
An aluminum wheel design

Discused here is the manufacturing of modern single-piece wheels, i.e., non-wire wheels, e.g., wheels of cars and other heavier vehicles. Wheels are constructed in a wide variety of designs using different materials, but in the early 21st century, aluminum and steel are most often used, with steel-made wheels being heavier and more durable than aluminum wheels. The performance of a wheel depends on the alloy and technique used to construct it. A wheel is usually made up of a rim, which connects with the tire, and a central disc, also known as the disc or spider, which connects the wheel to the vehicle. Wheel rims are usually of two types: semi-drop center (SDC), used in trucks, and drop center (DC), used in other vehicles.

Most single-piece wheels are made using casting, forging, rim rolling and/or high light methods.

== Casting ==
In casting, wheels are made by using a mold. The mold is filled with molten metal; as the metal cools, the wheel becomes strong and rigid. Various types of casting processes result in wheels with different properties. Gravity casting and low-pressure casting are common types of casting.

=== Gravity casting ===
In gravity casting, metal is poured into a mold and gravity alone causes the molten metal to fill the mold. This method is simple and low-cost, but aluminum cast this way will not be as dense as with other casting methods. Wheels constructed by this method are therefore made slightly heavier to achieve equivalent strength.

=== Low-pressure casting ===
In this method, molten aluminum is pumped into molds at heightened speed, which increases pressure and prevents formation of bubbles. Low-pressure casting is most common type of wheel casting because of the strength and quality of wheels formed by this method.

== Forging ==
The forging method is considered best for making single-piece wheels because the wheels made using this method are both lightweight and strong. In this method, a stronger and denser wheel is produced by shaping an aluminum billet under high heat and at about 900 bars of pressure.

== Rim-rolling ==
In this method, simple casting and a special rolling machine are used to construct wheels. The desired wheel is molded by heating its outer portion, with pressure provided by spinning the unfinished wheel, and sculpting the wheel using specialized rollers. This method creates a wheel similar in quality to forged wheels, but at a lower cost. OEM (original equipment manufacturing) wheels constructed by this method are used in special performance vehicles.

== High light technology ==
This method is used to construct light wheels of racing vehicles. In this method, the material is compressed using rollers along a low-pressure aluminum barrel, which gives it its required shape and form.

== Methods of multi-piece wheel construction ==
Two- or three-piece wheels, also known as multi-piece wheels, are assembled from pieces constructed separately by the methods mentioned above. Bolts or welding, or both, can be used to assemble the separate parts of such wheels.
