= Divide and Rule (novella) =

1939 novella by L. Sprague de Camp

- Short story by L. Sprague de Camp
- Country: United States
- Language: English
- Genre: Science fiction

Publication
- Published in: Unknown
- Publisher: Fantasy Press
- Media type: Print (Magazine)
- Publication date: April, May 1939

Divide and Rule is a science fiction novella by American writer L. Sprague de Camp. It was first published as a serial in the magazine Unknown from April to May, 1939 and first appeared in book form in de Camp's collection Divide and Rule (Fantasy Press, 1948). The story was revised for book publication. The first stand-alone book edition of the story was published as a large-print hardcover by Thorndike Press in September 2003. An E-book edition of the story was issued by Gollancz's SF Gateway imprint on September 29, 2011 as part of a general release of de Camp's works in electronic form.

The story has also appeared in the anthologies Cosmic Knights (Signet/NEL, 1985), The Mammoth Book of Classic Science Fiction: Short Novels of the 1930s (Robinson, 1988), Divide and Rule/The Sword of Rhiannon (Tor, 1990), and Great Tales of Classic Science Fiction (Galahad Books, 1990).

== Plot summary ==
A future earth has been conquered by the extraterrestrial "Hoppers," aliens resembling kangaroos. To secure their dominance, the Hoppers have reserved all advanced technology for their own use and resurrected the feudal society of the European Middle Ages, which they have imposed on the earthlings to prevent them from uniting against their conquerors. The story follows one such feudal lord, Sir Howard Van Slyck, a younger son of the Duke of Poughkeepsie, whose knight-errant quest leads him by degrees to question and challenge Hopper rule. After his brother Frank is executed for engaging in scientific research he joins the Wyoming knight Lyman Haas in the anti-Hopper underground, in which he becomes privy to a conspiracy to topple the alien rulers.

== Reception ==
John K. Aiken, writing in Fantasy Review, rates de Camp "very nearly at his best" in this story, and his best as "very good indeed." He considers it "[a]ltogether, as sprightly and enjoyable a [tale] as one might meet in a couple of years' reading." He appreciates the basis of de Camp's science fiction "in the behaviour of real people living in unfamiliar social set-ups, logically developed from to-day's trends or from a given premise." He does feel "that Mr. de Camp's sense of humour [can] sometimes run away with him," as in "the extremely improbable details of the feudal regime set up by the Hoppers ... but improbability is here outweighed by entertainment value and by a certain wild consistency which is supported by the reality of the characters." His primary criticism is of a "scientific flaw" he perceives in the gimmick that provides the resolution.

Astounding reviewer P. Schuyler Miller praised the book for "provid[ing] more sheer entertainment than any the fantasy publishers have yet given us," noting that de Camp uses his "detailed knowledge of history" to depict "hypothetical future societies which ape those of the past--with differences."

Sam Moskowitz saw the influence of Mark Twain in the story. Calling de Camp "the funniest writer in science fiction," he noted that "[t]hough the writing was choppy in spots, the details of an utterly unique social set-up, complete with its own slang, was engrossingly worked out and chuckle-provoking."

William Mattathias Robins calls the piece "a story of the awakening of political consciousness [in which] Sir Howard progresses from viewing all his relationships in terms of class divisions to respecting people for their merit as individuals."

Brian M. Stableford thought it "an eccentric story" and like the rest of "the work that de Camp [did] for Unknown ... quite impressive."

To Don D'Ammassa "Divide and Rule" is "of particular note" among the "many memorable short stories" de Camp wrote.

David Pringle, giving the story two out of three stars, rated it "[a] good-humoured adventure yarn."

According to Earl Terry Kemp the story "shows de Camp's pre-war work at its best, [and] was a landmark in integrating adventure into the society out of which it arises." He feels the author "has played with the forces that form a society in a very amusing way which shows considerable sociological insight" and that "[a]s is frequently the case with de Camp's work, the ideas behind the story are even more interesting than the [story itself]. De Camp's work is a sort of Lewis Carroll nonsense-made-sensible--and that phrase best describes the ... novella."

== Relationship to other works ==
In its portrait of a medieval-level society in the shadow of a technologically advanced one, "Divide and Rule" prefigures de Camp's later Krishna series, even down to such details as elephant-drawn trains (replaced by the elephant-analog "bishtars" in the Krishna stories).
