= Formula One drivers from Japan =

List of Formula One drivers who competed as Japanese

- Drivers: 22
- Grands Prix: 529
- Entries: 711
- Starts: 668
- Best season finish: 8th (2004)
- Wins: 0
- Podiums: 3
- Pole positions: 0
- Fastest laps: 3
- Points: 335
- First entry: 1975 Dutch Grand Prix
- Latest entry: 2026 Mexico City Grand Prix
- 2026 drivers: Ryo Hirakawa; Yuki Tsunoda

There have been 22 Formula One drivers from Japan, of whom 19 have started a race. Three drivers have each achieved a single podium finish, but none has won a Grand Prix.

== Former drivers ==
The first Japanese Formula One driver was Hiroshi Fushida. He qualified for the 1975 Dutch Grand Prix, but a blown engine prevented him from starting the race. He failed to qualify for the British Grand Prix later in the season.

Masahiro Hasemi started one World Championship race, the 1976 Japanese Grand Prix. He came into the event having won the non-championship Japanese GP the year prior. He finished the race 11th and 7 laps down, the last classified finisher.

Masami Kuwashima was entered in the 1976 Japanese GP with Wolf-Williams. He participated in the first practice session and was promptly replaced with Hans Binder having posted very uncompetitive times. He never entered another event.

Noritake Takahara participated in the Japanese Grands Prix of 1976 and 1977. He finished ninth in the former and retired following a first-lap crash with Mario Andretti and Hans Binder in the latter.

Motocross turned open-wheel racer Kazuyoshi Hoshino also participated in the first two World Championship Japanese Grands Prix. "The fastest man in Japan" retired from the 1976 race due to recurring tyre problems, before finishing 11th and two laps down in the 1977 event.

Kunimitsu Takahashi entered a single race, the 1977 Japanese Grand Prix, where he finished ninth. "The Father of Drifting" was the last Japanese driver to enter an F1 race for a decade.

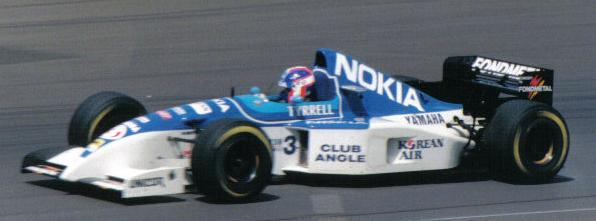
Katayama driving for Tyrrell at the 1995 British Grand Prix.

Satoru Nakajima became the first full-time Japanese Formula One driver in 1987, as a Honda-affiliated driver for Team Lotus alongside established Brazilian driver Ayrton Senna. He became the first Japanese F1 driver to score points, in only his second race. In a career that spanned 5 seasons and 80 Grands Prix, he made a name for himself as a respected mid-field runner, who despite never beating his team-mates in the Drivers' Championship was known as a formidable competitor.

Aguri Suzuki became the first Japanese driver to score a podium in a World Championship race when he finished third in his home race in 1990. He made his debut two years earlier, with Larrousse, and raced in Formula One for eight years with five different teams.

Naoki Hattori entered two Grands Prix, the 1991 events held in Japan and Australia as a replacement for Pedro Chaves. He failed to qualify for either race.

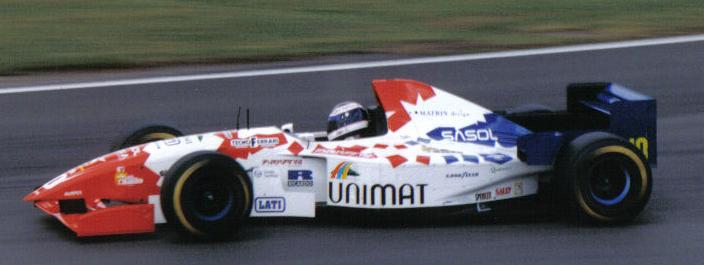
Inoue driving for Footwork at the 1995 British Grand Prix.

For many years, Ukyo Katayama was the Japanese driver with the most Grand Prix starts, until he was surpassed by Yuki Tsunoda. In a career that spanned 97 Grands Prix over six seasons, he scored a total of five World Championship points, all of them for the Tyrrell team in 1994. His career was largely unspectacular, failing to finish in 63 out of the 95 races he started, along with a disqualification in the 1996 European Grand Prix.

Toshio Suzuki (no relation to Aguri) qualified for the Japanese and Australian rounds of the 1993 season, he finished both races outside the points.

Hideki Noda became the Larrousse team's fourth different driver to race in the #19 Larrousse LH94 when he competed in the final three races of the 1994 season. He failed to finish any of them.

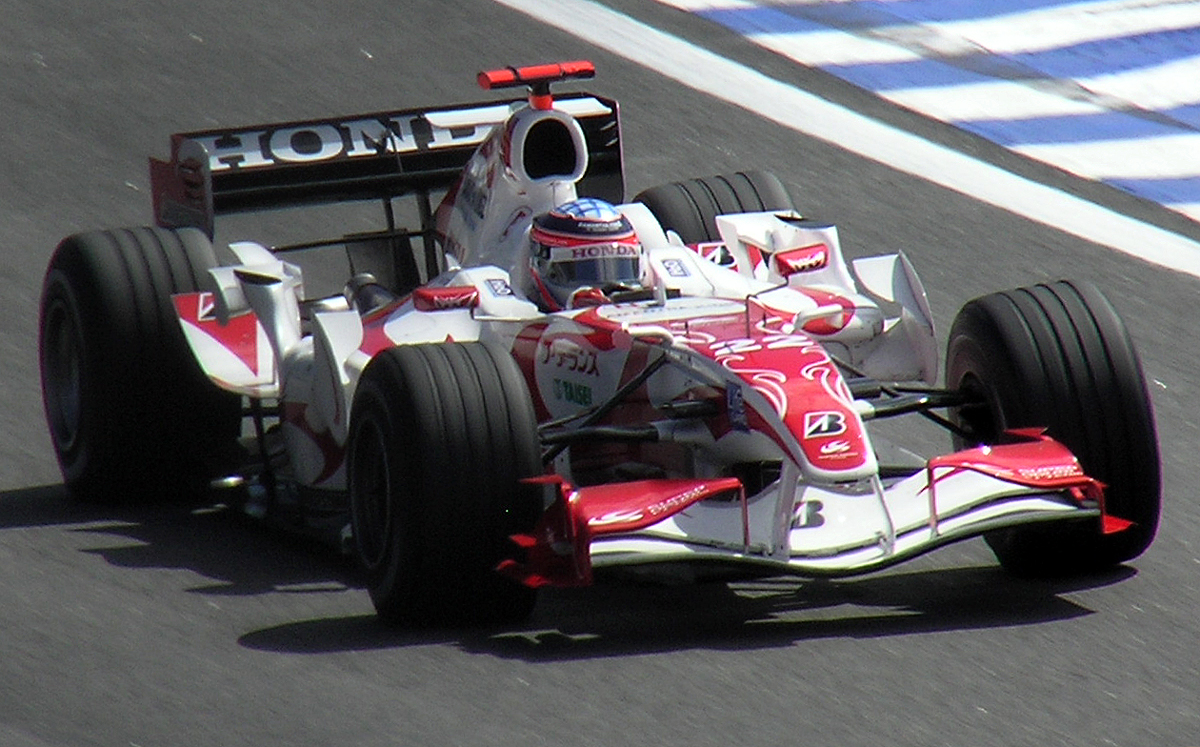
Sato driving for Super Aguri at the 2006 Brazilian Grand Prix.

Taki Inoue debuted with the Simtek team at the 1994 Japanese Grand Prix, failing to finish. Despite this, Footwork Arrows snapped him up for the 1995 season where he would complete the season. He did not score any points, but was involved in bizarre incidents involving the safety car at both the Monaco and Hungarian Grands Prix. He did not retain his drive the following season.

Mugen-affiliated driver Shinji Nakano made his debut with the Prost team in 1997 in return for an engine supply deal. He scored 2 points with 6th-place finishes in Canada and Hungary. He was dropped by the team when they switched to Peugeot engines in 1998, and was picked up by the Minardi squad. He failed to score any points that year, and was dropped post-season.

Toranosuke Takagi was scouted by Satoru Nakajima from an early age, and was fast-tracked to a Formula One seat with Tyrrell for the 1998 season. An unsuccessful season led to his release from the team, where he was hired by Arrows for 1999. This season was equally unsuccessful and Takagi was again released following the season, ending his Formula One career.

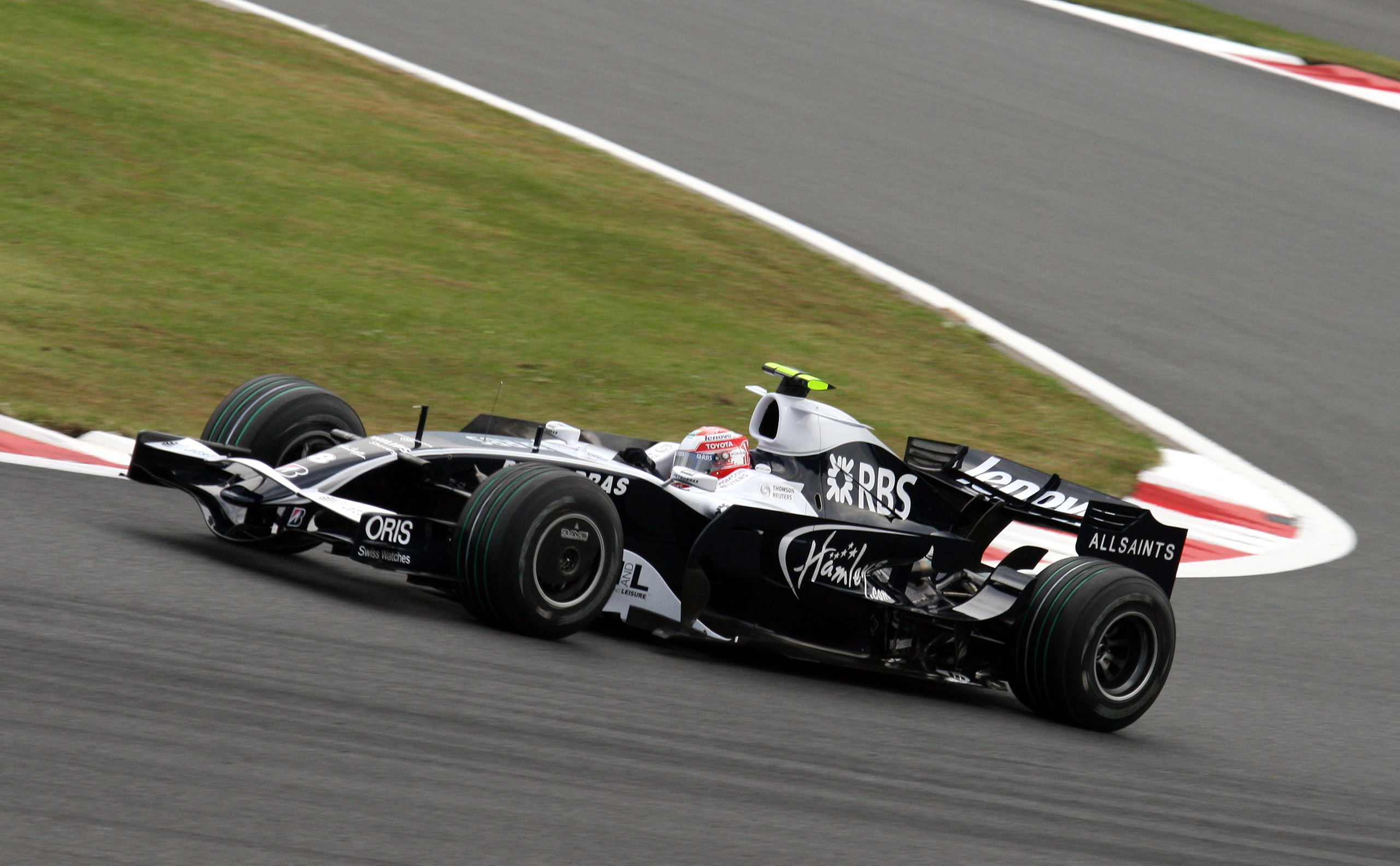
Kazuki Nakajima driving for Williams at the 2008 Japanese Grand Prix.

The 2002 season saw the debut of Takuma Sato, having been hired by the Jordan team due to his relationship with Honda. His debut season was one of contrasts, from a 5th-place finish in his home race to a spectacular crash in Austria. His inconsistency led to him being replaced by Ralph Firman for the 2003 season. He was hired by B.A.R. as a test driver for the 2003 season and was elevated to a race seat for the last race of the season following the departure of Jacques Villeneuve. Sato's next two seasons were also contrasting - from scoring his only podium finish at the 2004 United States Grand Prix to the suspension of the team's competition for a period of the 2005 season. He was hired by Aguri Suzuki's team for the 2006 season and spearheaded the backmarker team for its lifespan. He scored the only points for the team at the Spanish and Canadian round of the 2007 season before his Formula One career ended when the Super Aguri team pulled out before the 2008 Turkish Grand Prix. He attempted to join Scuderia Toro Rosso for 2009 but was unsuccessful. Sato competed in the IndyCar Series full-time from 2010 to 2022, and exclusively on oval tracks in 2023. He has won six IndyCar Series races as of 2024, including the Indianapolis 500 in 2017 and 2020.

Yuji Ide was hired by the Super Aguri team in 2006 as part of the team's plan to field the first all-Japanese line-up in Formula One history. He participated in the first 4 races of the season before having his FIA Super License revoked due to his backmarker status and a large crash he caused with Christijan Albers. He was replaced with Franck Montagny.

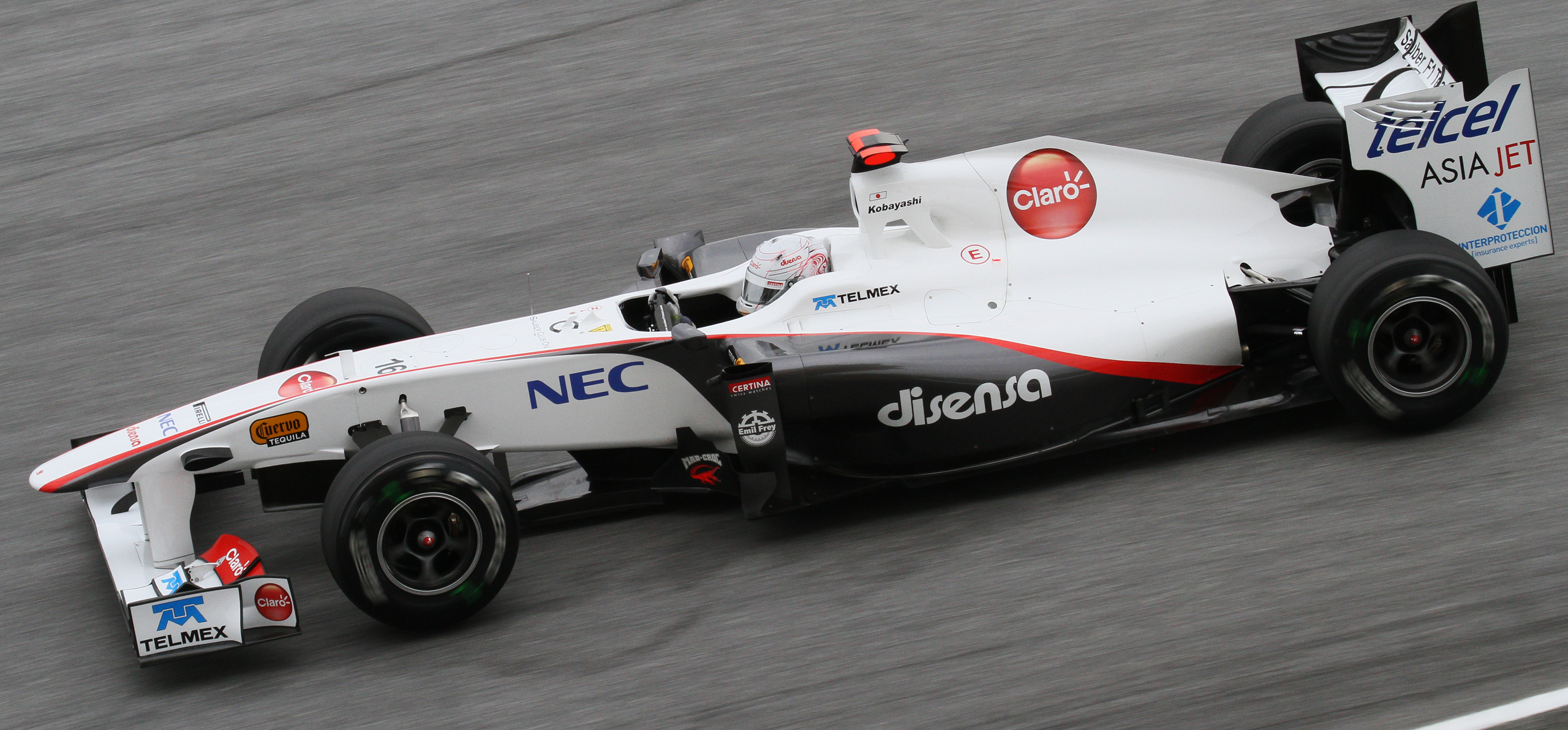
Kobayashi driving for Sauber at the 2011 Malaysian Grand Prix.

Sakon Yamamoto was signed as a test driver of Super Aguri following the revoking of Ide's Super License. He made his debut at the 2006 German Grand Prix later in the season, but failed to finish his first four races. Yamamoto later drove for Spyker in 2007 and HRT in 2010, failing to score a point in any of the subsequent Grands Prix he entered. His final appearance was the 2010 Korean Grand Prix.

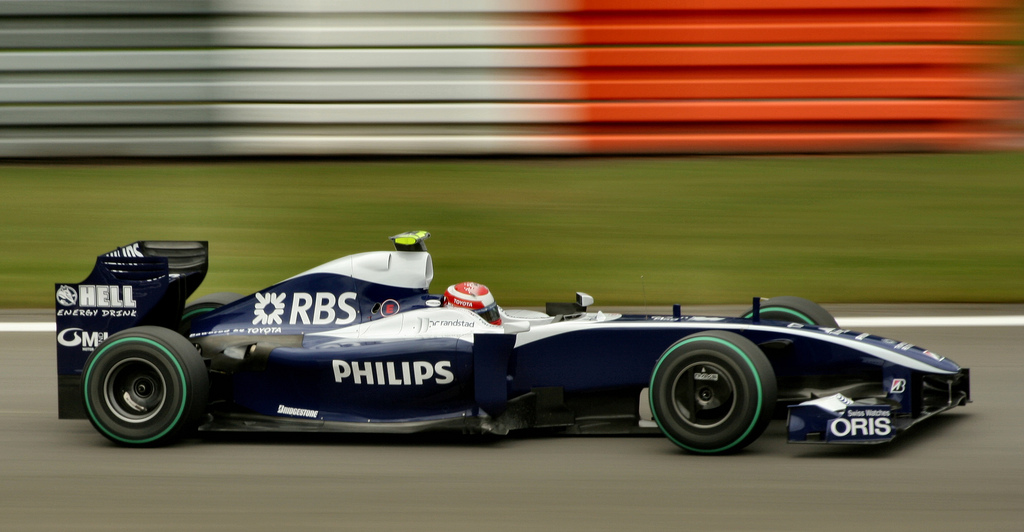
Nakajima driving for Williams at the 2009 German Grand Prix

At the 2007 Brazilian Grand Prix, Kazuki Nakajima, the son of Satoru Nakajima, became the first second-generation Japanese F1 driver. He filled the seat of Alexander Wurz, who had retired with immediate effect following the previous race. He made all his 36 starts with Williams alongside fellow second-generation driver (and 2016 World Champion) Nico Rosberg, with a best result of sixth at the 2008 Australian Grand Prix. He was dropped in favour of test driver Nico Hülkenberg for the 2010 season, and was signed by new-team candidate Stefan GP, who subsequently failed to make the grid and Kazuki was left without a drive.

Kamui Kobayashi made his debut at the 2009 Brazilian Grand Prix for Toyota Racing following an injury to regular driver Timo Glock. He was retained for the final race of the season in Abu Dhabi and scored a points-finish. This led to the Sauber team snapping him up for the next three seasons, where he consistently finished in points-scoring positions and made his name as an aggressive midfield driver. He was rewarded for his efforts with a podium at the 2012 Japanese Grand Prix, along with 3 other podium finishes for team-mate Sergio Pérez. Despite this, he was left without a drive for the 2013 season. For 2014 he was signed to the backmarker Caterham F1 alongside debutant Marcus Ericsson - and inevitably struggled with the financially inferior team. He was replaced with André Lotterer for the event in Belgium, and sat out the rounds in the United States and Brazil due to the team's financial issues. Kobayashi's (and Caterham's) last race ended in a retirement.

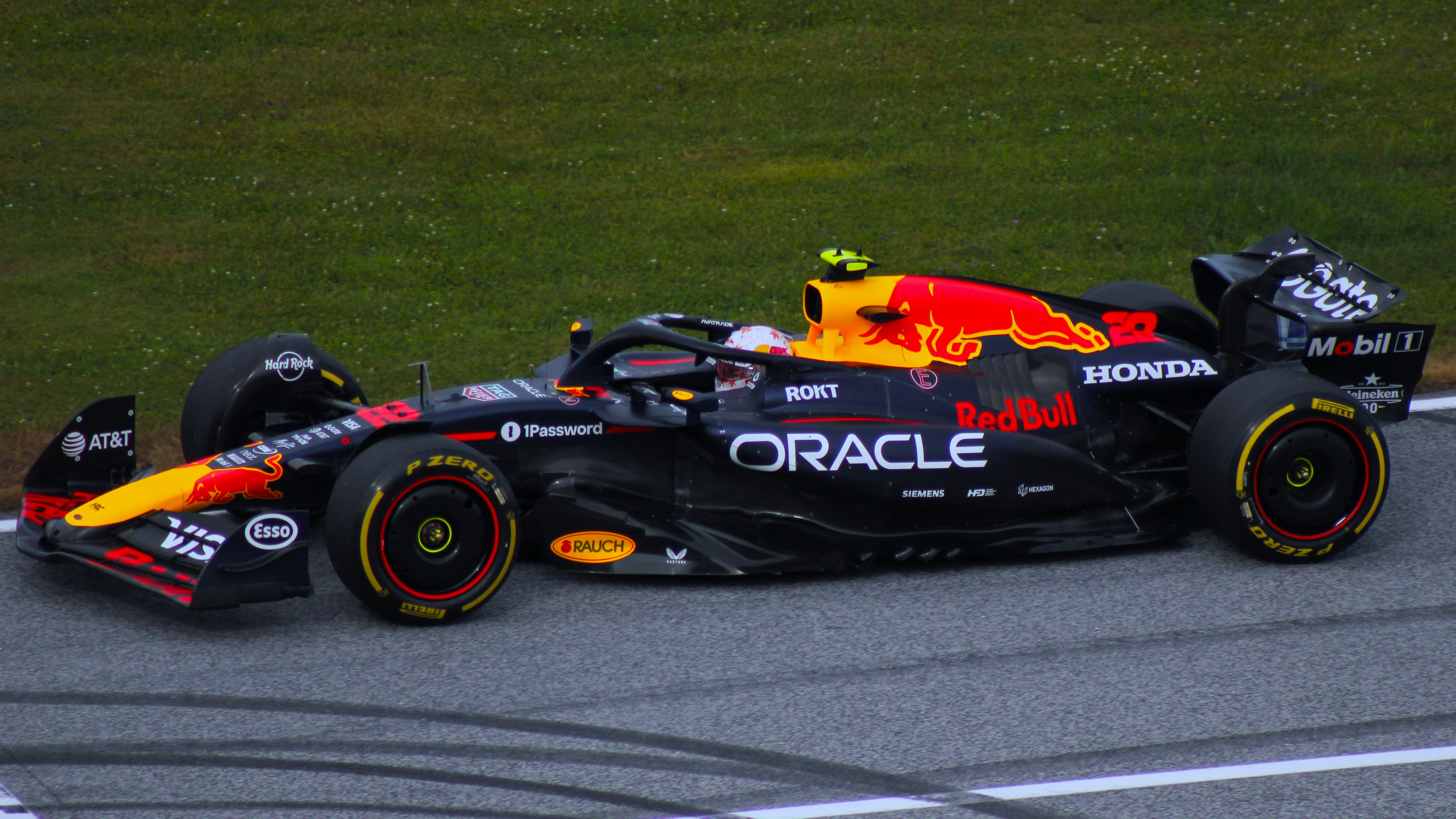
Tsunoda driving for Red Bull at the 2025 Austrian Grand Prix

Yuki Tsunoda drove for AlphaTauri when he joined Formula One in 2021 and remained with the team when they became RB in 2024. Tsunoda was contracted to stay at RB through to 2025, but was promoted to Red Bull Racing following the Chinese Grand Prix. He became a reserve driver for Red Bull and Racing Bulls in 2026, and made three Grand Prix appearances that year for Racing Bulls in place of Liam Lawson.

== Statistics ==
Drivers	Active Years	Entries	Wins	Podiums	Career Points	Poles	Fastest Laps
Hiroshi Fushida	1975	2 (0 starts)	0	0	0	0	0
Masahiro Hasemi	1976	1	0	0	0	0	0
Masami Kuwashima	1976	1 (0 starts)	0	0	0	0	0
Kazuyoshi Hoshino	1976–1977	2	0	0	0	0	0
Noritake Takahara	1976–1977	2	0	0	0	0	0
Kunimitsu Takahashi	1977	1	0	0	0	0	0
Satoru Nakajima	1987–1991	80 (74 starts)	0	0	16	0	1
Aguri Suzuki	1988–1995	88 (64 starts)	0	1	8	0	0
Naoki Hattori	1991	2 (0 starts)	0	0	0	0	0
Ukyo Katayama	1992–1997	97 (95 starts)	0	0	5	0	0
Toshio Suzuki	1993	2	0	0	0	0	0
Hideki Noda	1994	3	0	0	0	0	0
Taki Inoue	1994–1995	18	0	0	0	0	0
Shinji Nakano	1997–1998	33	0	0	2	0	0
Toranosuke Takagi	1998–1999	32	0	0	0	0	0
Takuma Sato	2002–2008	92 (90 starts)	0	1	44	0	0
Yuji Ide	2006	4	0	0	0	0	0
Sakon Yamamoto	2006–2007, 2010	21	0	0	0	0	0
Kazuki Nakajima	2007–2009	36	0	0	9	0	0
Kamui Kobayashi	2009–2012, 2014	76 (75 starts)	0	1	125	0	1
Yuki Tsunoda	2021–2026	117 (114 starts)	0	0	125	0	1
Ryo Hirakawa	2026	1 (1 starts)	0	0	1	0	0
