= Nissan Skyline RS Silhouette Formula =

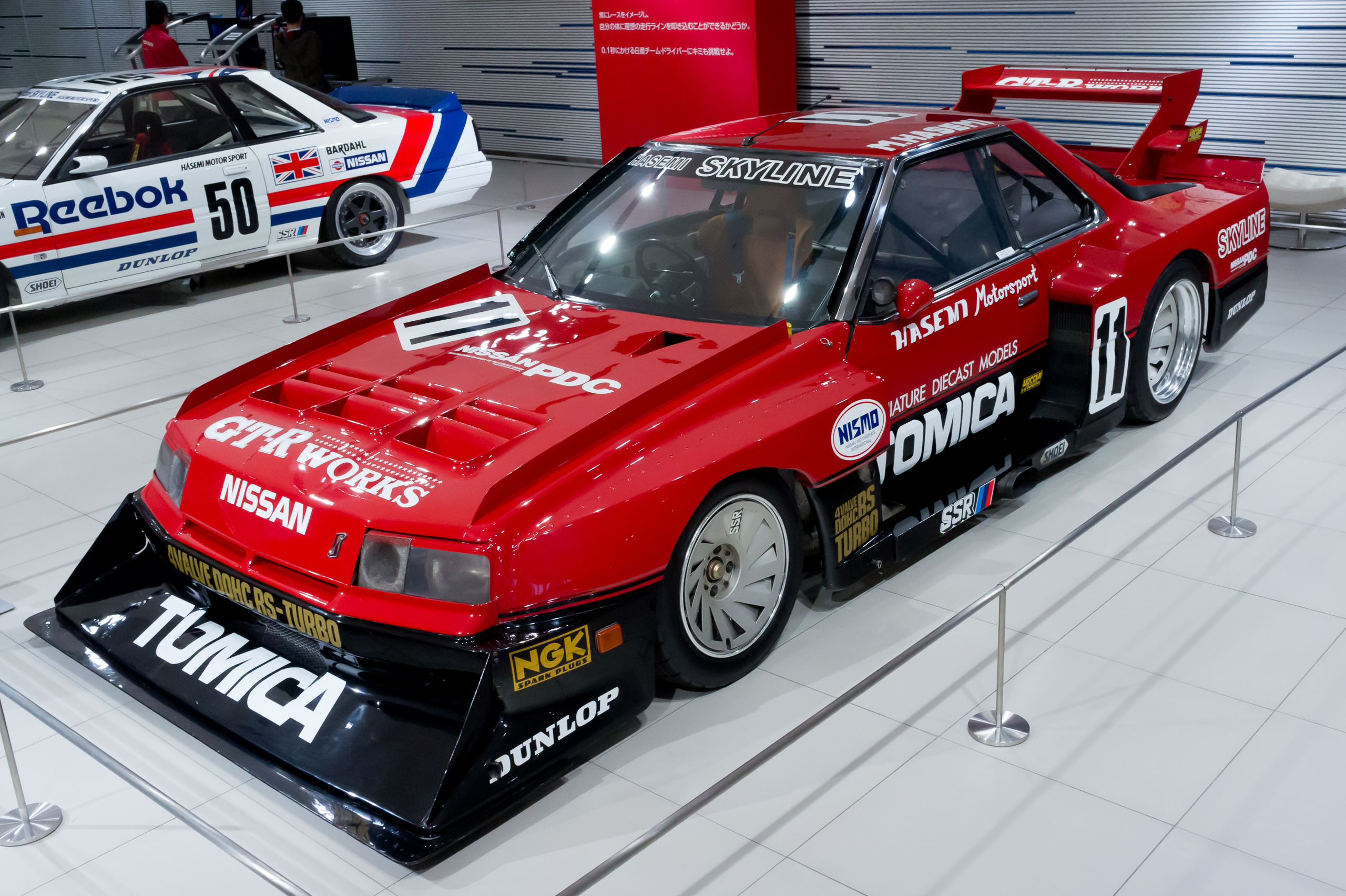
- Skyline RS Silhouette Formula in 1984 configuration
- Category: Group 5
- Constructor: Oppama Works; Nova Engineering; Mooncraft
- Designer: Takuya Yura
- Production: 1982
- Successor: Nissan Skyline Turbo C

Technical specifications
- Chassis: Steel tubular space frame
- Length: 5,065 mm (199.4 in)
- Width: 1,980 mm (78 in)
- Height: 1,239 mm (48.8 in)
- Axle track: 1,487 mm (58.5 in)
- Wheelbase: 2,615 mm (103.0 in)
- Engine: Nissan LZ20BT 2,083 cc (127 cu in) I4 twin Garrett T05B turbochargers longitudinally front-mounted
- Torque: 55 kg⋅m (539 N⋅m; 398 lb⋅ft) @ 6,400 rpm
- Transmission: Doug Nash 5-speed manual
- Power: 570 PS (562 hp; 419 kW) @ 7,600 rpm
- Weight: 1,005 kg (2,216 lb)
- Brakes: AP Lockheed 4-piston calipers
- Tyres: Dunlop 270/590-16 (front), 350/700-19 (rear); SSR Formula Mesh wheels
- Clutch: Borg & Beck triple plate

Competition history
- Notable entrants: Hasemi Motor Sport
- Notable drivers: Masahiro Hasemi; David Hobbs; Tony Pond; Kenji Tohira
- Debut: 1982 Super Silhouette Round 2
- First win: 1982 RRC Fuji Championship Super Silhouette Race
- Last win: 1984 Super Silhouette Super Cup (NC)
- Last season: 1983 Super Silhouette; 1984 Super Silhouette (NC)
Races	Wins
17	8 (7 NC)

The Nissan Skyline RS Silhouette Formula is a silhouette racing car designed and built by Nissan.

== Design ==
As with other silhouette cars, the Skyline RS Silhouette Formula shares design elements with the road-going R30 Skyline RS, but its engineering differs radically. Designed for Group 5 regulations, it combines a space frame built by Nova Engineering with Mooncraft bodywork and a turbocharged Nissan LZ20BT inline-four engine capable of approximately 570 PS (560 hp; 420 kW) and 55 kg⋅m (540 N⋅m; 400 lb⋅ft).

In 1983, the car received a minor styling update to go with the facelifted R30 Skyline.

== Competition history ==
Racing in the Fuji Super Silhouette Series, the Skyline RS Silhouette Formula scored 2 wins in 1982 and 5 wins in 1983 with Masahiro Hasemi behind the wheel. The car also competed in the 1982 Kyalami 9 Hours.
