= Kuwashima =

Kuwashima (桑島) is a Japanese surname. Notable people with the surname include:

- Houko Kuwashima (born 1975), Japanese voice actress and singer
- Masami Kuwashima (born 1950), Japanese racing driver
