= SSR Wheels =

Japanese wheel manufacturer

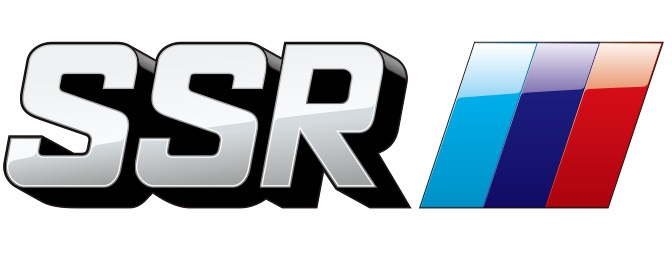
- Industry: Motorsport
- Founded: 1971
- Headquarters: Minoh, Osaka, Japan
- Products: Alloy wheels
- Revenue: ▲US$14.9 million
- Parent: Tanabe Co., Ltd
- Website: SSR-Wheels.com

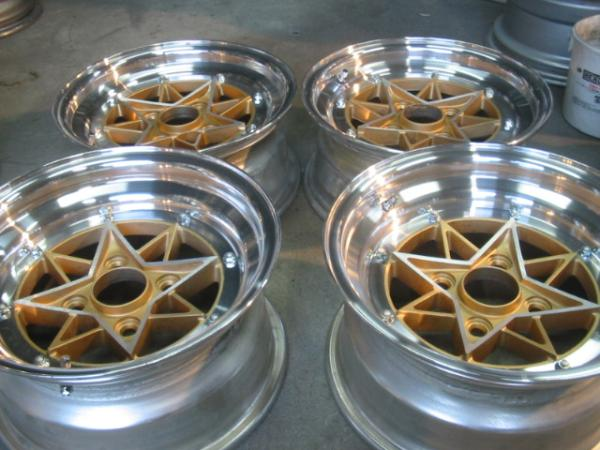
SSR Star Shark wheels

SSR Wheels (formerly known as Speed Star Racing Wheels) is a Japanese wheel manufacturer for both motorsport and aftermarket applications, headquartered in Osaka, Japan.

The company is often credited as being the first to ever make a three-piece wheel with their MK-I wheel in 1971, and remains one of the most notable Japanese producers of aftermarket and motorsport wheels.

== History ==
Speed Star Racing Wheels were launched in 1971 by Speed Star Co., Ltd. to produce three-piece wheels. The company later launched two-piece wheels, as well as both cast and forged wheels.

SSR notably helped motivate the creation of the JWL standard in 1973 and helped establish the VIA third-party statutory board in 1981, in order to certify quality standards within wheel manufacturing in Japan. These standards are regulated by the Ministry of Land, Infrastructure, Transport and Tourism.

In 1985, a new overseas office in Los Angeles was established for international sales.

SSR was the first and only alloy wheel manufacturer at the time to utilize the semi-solid forging (SSF) process in 1991, a process which the company later patented. A new factory in Nara was established in 1993. The lightest wheel by size made at the time, the SSR Type-C was released in 2000. In 2002, SSR invented a two-piece hybrid wheel using both semi-solid forging and heat treatment technologies.

The company was acquired by Tanabe Co., Ltd in 2005.

== Motorsport ==
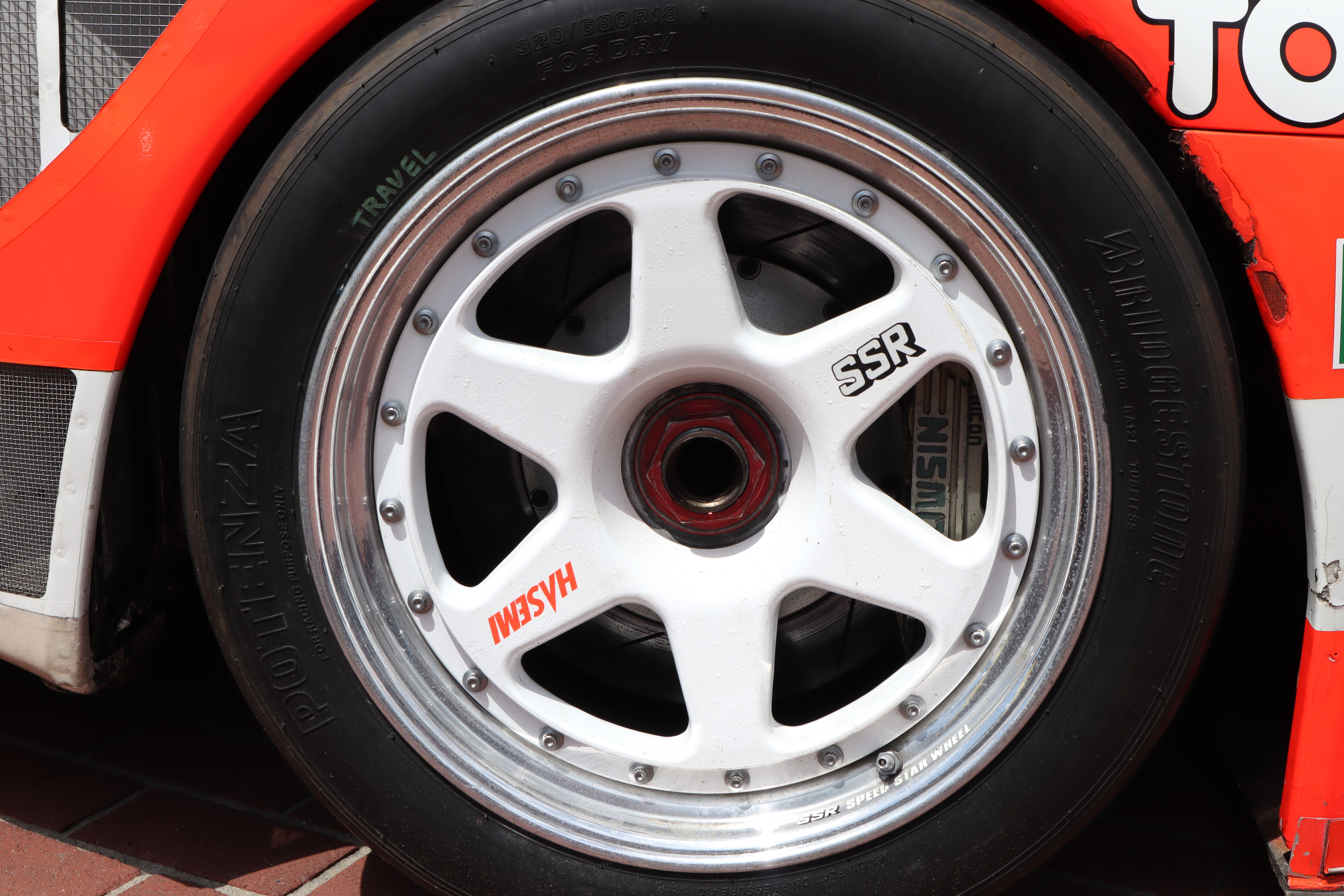
SSR wheel used on a JTCC Nissan Skyline GT-R race car

SSR has been a wheel supplier to factory race teams of Honda, Toyota, and Nissan, customer race teams, and operated its own race team, in racing series such as Super GT, Japanese Touring Car Championship (JTCC), All Japan Grand Touring Car Championship (JGTC), and Formula Nippon. Their aftermarket wheels are popular with owners of sport compact and import cars on the race and show circuits.

=== Formula racing ===
SSR's factory race team, Speed Star Racing, participated in the top flight of Japanese single-seater racing in the 1977 All-Japan Formula 2000 championship with Kunimitsu Takahashi, winning 3 races and finishing as the championship runner up.

The team also participated in the 1978 and 1979 All-Japan Formula Two Championship with Takahashi, finishing 6th and 4th respectively. Naohiro Fujita finished in 3rd place for the team in 1981. Motoharu Kurosawa also drove for the team in 1981 and 1982, and finished 10th and 6th respectively.

From 1984 to 1991, the Speed Star Wheel Racing Team participated in the All-Japan Formula Two Championship, which was then renamed the All-Japan Formula 3000 Championship from 1987 onwards, with Masahiro Hasemi, Jeff Krosnoff and Yoshiyasu Tachi as the drivers.

SSR supplied wheels for the Leyton House Racing team in Formula One for use on their March 881 for the 1988 season.

=== Endurance racing ===
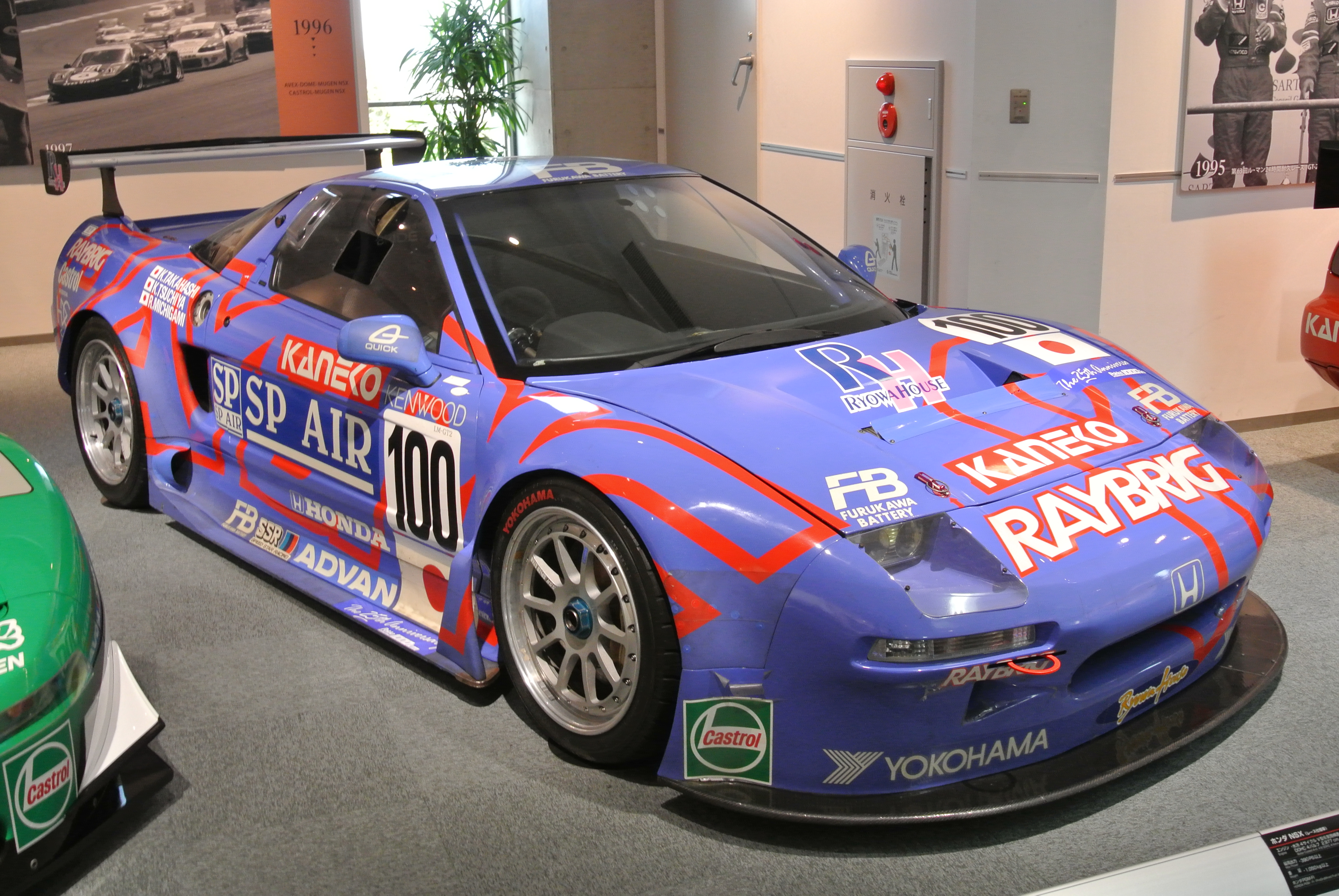
SSR wheels on the Team Kunimitsu Honda NSX used in the 1996 24 Hours of Le Mans

In the racing series predecessor to the All Japan Endurance Championship, as well as individual races, Speed Star Wheel Racing entered a Group 4 BMW M1 for endurance racing. This BMW M1, chassis #1077, was built and sold by Ron Dennis and Project Four Racing in 1979 instead of being used in the defunct BMW M1 Procar Championship. In Group C, the SSR M1 won the 1979 Group C Suzuka 500 mile. In Group 4, the team won the 1980 Japanese Endurance Championship, as well as the 1980 Mt Fuji 500 km, 1980 Mt Fuji 1000 km, 1980 All Japan Mt Fuji 500 mile, and the 1981 Fuji 1000 km. The M1 was rebuilt to Group 5 regulations for 1982. In Group 5, the SSR M1 won the 1982 All Japan Fuji 500 km, 1982 All Japan Mt Fuji 1000 km, 1982 International Suzuka 1000 km, and the 1982 All Japan Mt Fuji 500 km, as well as finishing 4th overall in the 1982 World Endurance Championship round at Mt Fuji. With this level of dominance in 1982, the team again won the Japanese Endurance Championship. The M1 was retired in 1984 and has since been used for historic races and promotional purposes.

Team Kunimitsu raced an SSR-sponsored Honda NSX piloted by Kunimitsu Takahashi, Keiichi Tsuchiya, and Ryo Michigami in the 1996 24 Hours of Le Mans, finishing 3rd in the LMGT2 class and 16th overall.

Speed Star Racing was the title sponsor of Mark Hein and TI Racing's entrant into the 2000 Spa 24 Hours. The team raced an Acura Integra Type R and finished in 24th place.

=== Sports car racing ===
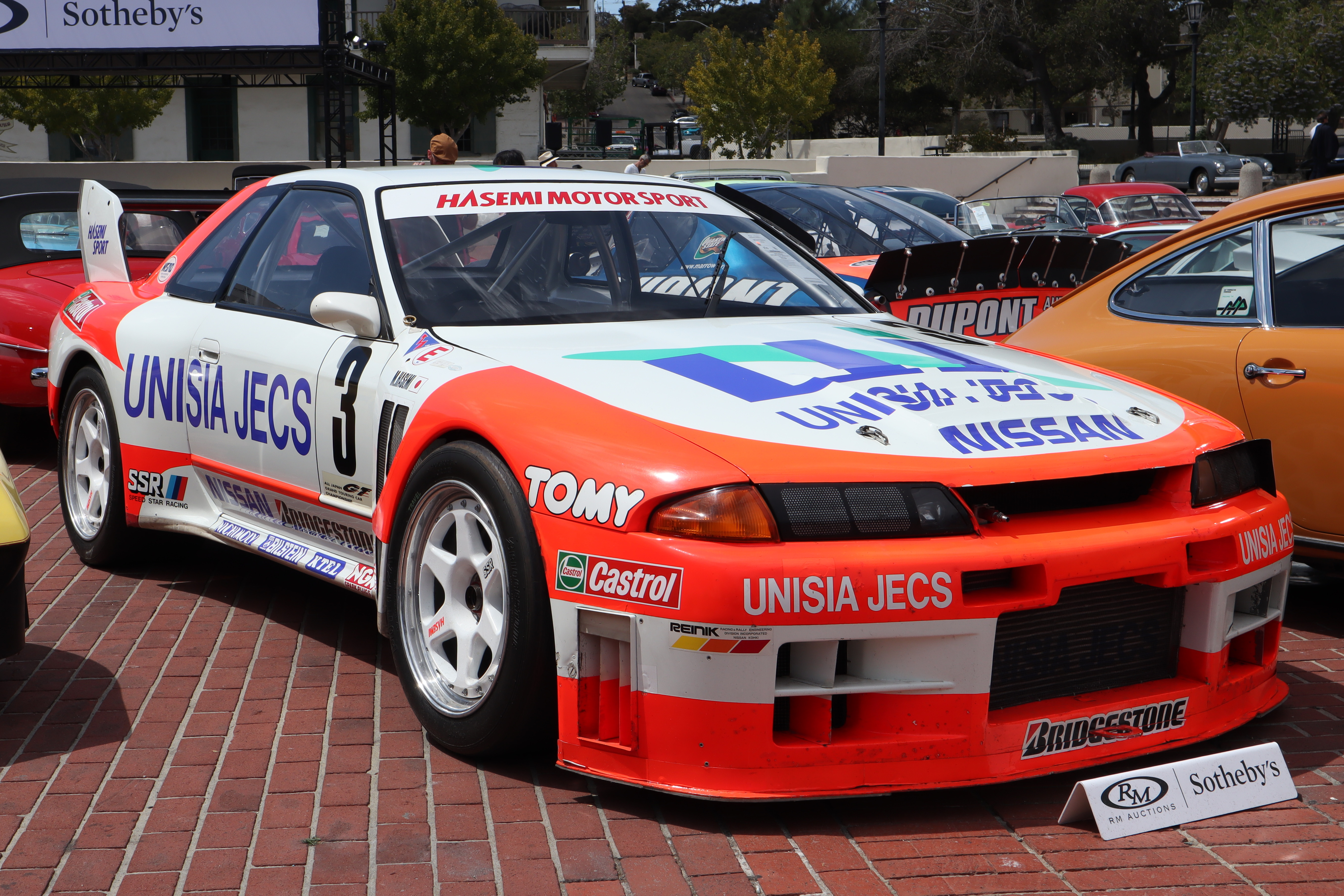
JTCC Hasemi Motorsport Skyline GT-R equipped with SSR wheels

SSR wheels were heavily used in Japanese touring car racing, most notably by SSR-sponsored team Hasemi Motorsport in the Japanese Touring Car Championship and All Japan Grand Touring Car Championship. In these series, Masahiro Hasemi raced an SSR-equipped Nissan Skyline GT-R. The team raced in the JTC-1 class of the JTCC from 1989 to 1993, winning the championship in 1989, 1991, and 1992, while finishing in 3rd in 1990 and 7th in 1993. In the JGTC, the team raced in the GT500 class from 1994 to 2000, with a best standing of 2nd place in the 1994 and 1995 championships.

Hasemi Motorsport also entered an SSR-sponsored Nissan Skyline RS Silhouette Formula in the 1980's. This car was built to Group 5 standards, and raced in the Group 5 class in super silhouette sports car races across Japan, primarily at Fuji Speedway. This Super Silhouette Skyline went on to win 2 races in 1982 and 5 races in 1983.

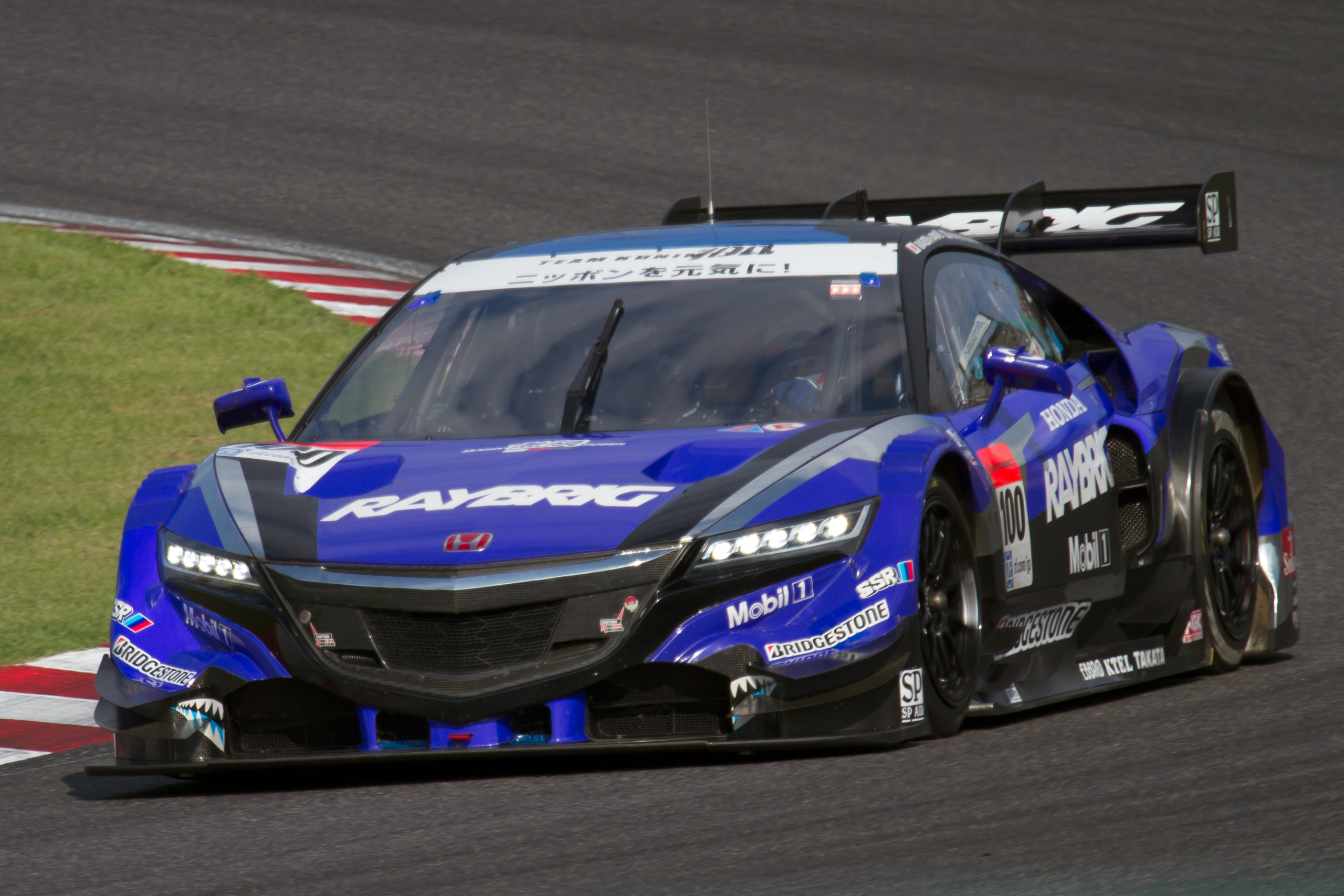
Team Kunimitsu Honda NSX Concept-GT with SSR wheels racing in the Super GT series

SSR also supplies wheels to many teams in the Super GT sports car racing series. The company has been an official sponsor for Team Mugen and Autobacs Racing Team Aguri in the GT300 series, as well as for Team Real Racing and Team Kunimitsu in the GT500 series. Team Mugen went on to win the 2013 GT300 championship, while Team Kunimitsu won the 2018 and 2020 GT500 championship.

=== Drifting ===
From 2006 to 2021, SSR sponsored Chris Forsberg and his team Forsberg Racing in the Formula D drifting series.

== Current lines ==
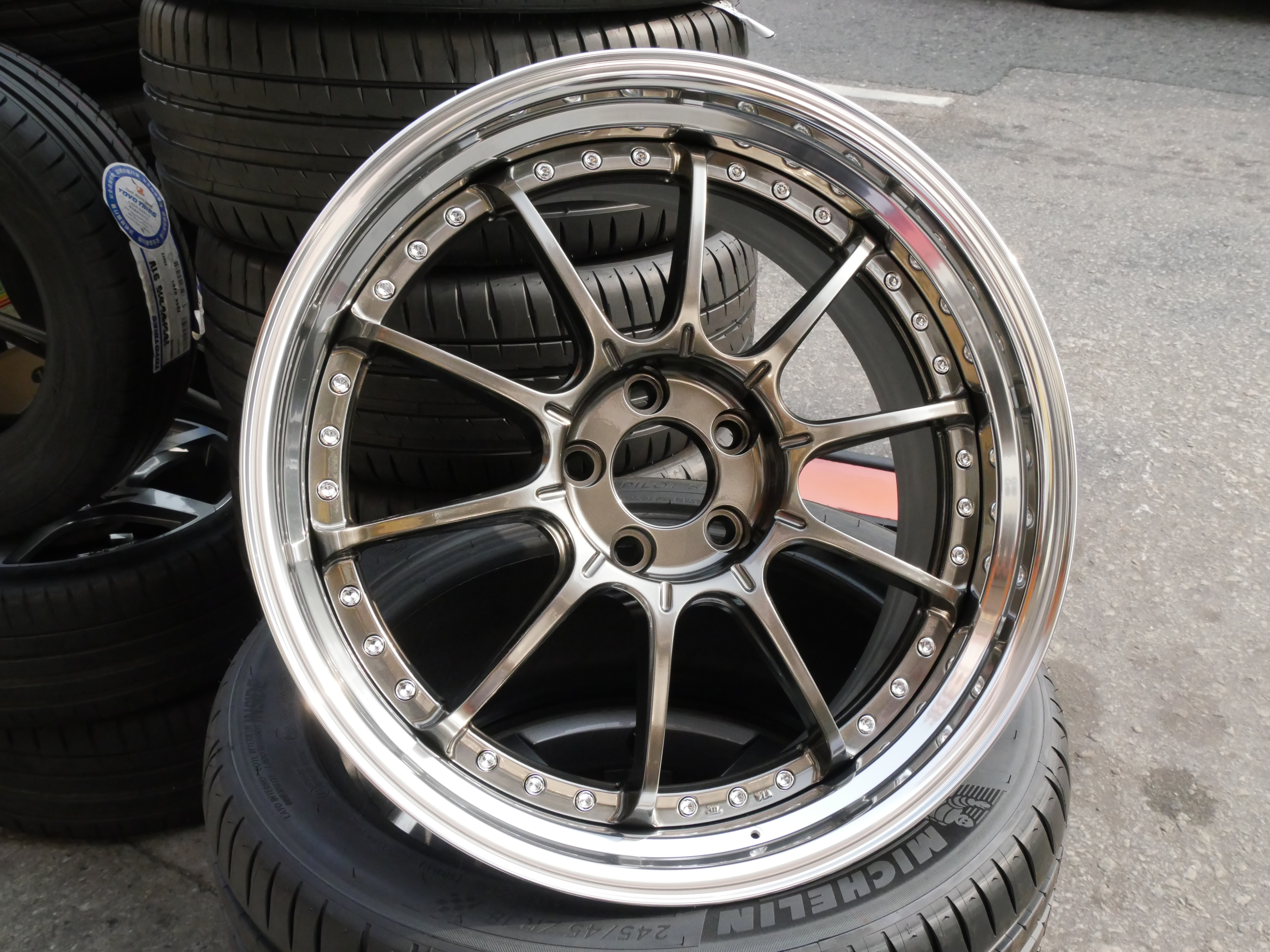
SSR Professor SP5 3-piece wheel

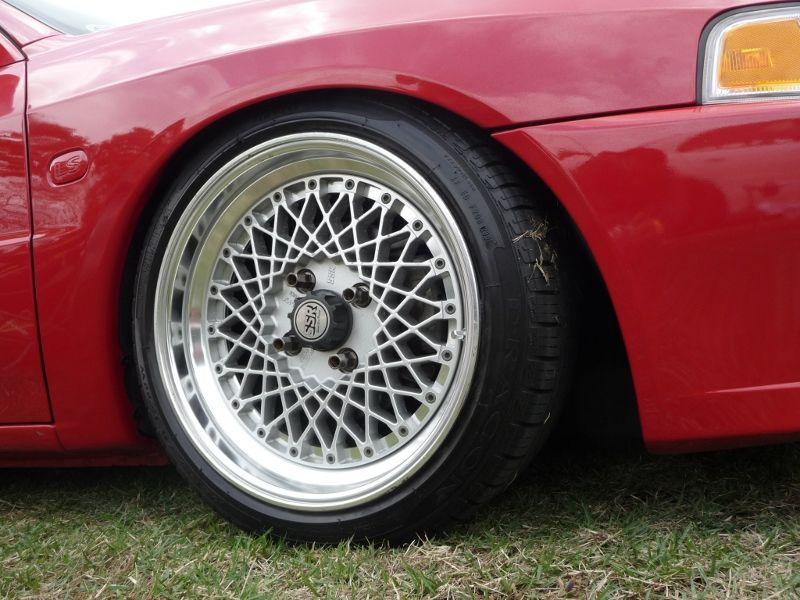
SSR Formula Mesh wheels

- GT
- Professor
- REINER
- MINERVA
- Formula
- SPEED STAR
- EXECUTOR
- ABELA
- Blikker
- DEVIDE
