= 2000 Spa 24 Hours =

2000 Proximus Spa 24 Hours

Seasons
- ← 1999 2001 →

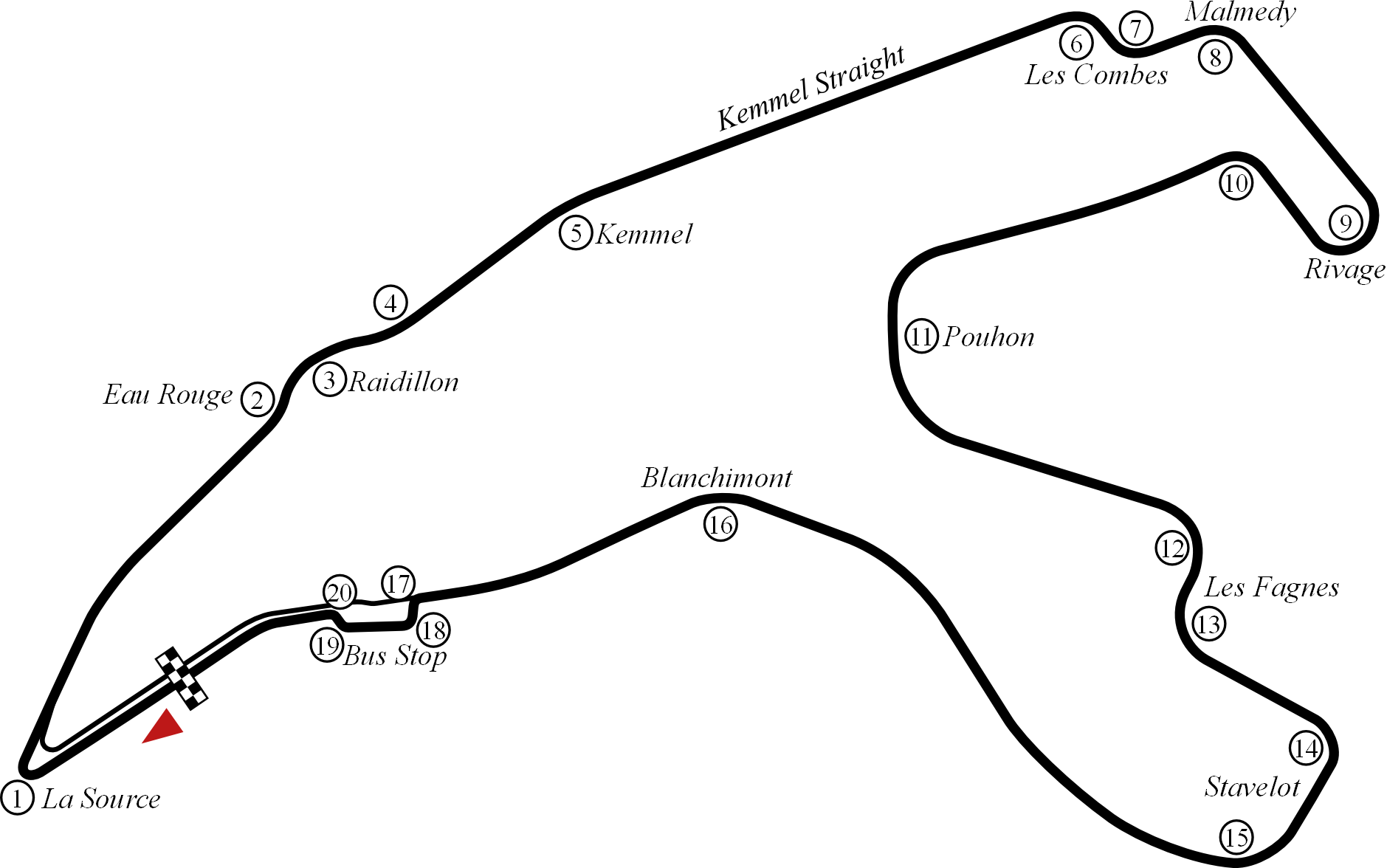
Layout of the Circuit de Spa-Francorchamps (1995-2003)

The 2000 Proximus 24 Spa World Championship GT was the 54th running of the Spa 24 Hours. It took place at the Circuit de Spa-Francorchamps, Belgium, over August 6, 2000. The event was won by the #1 Peugeot Team Belgique Luxembourg Peugeot 306 GTi.

3 classes ran in the event. Superproduction fuel (SP), Group N (N), and Superproduction diesel (SPD). 82 cars started with 38 being classified.

== Official results ==
Class winners in bold. Cars failing to complete 70% of winner's distance marked as Not Classified (NC).

| Pos | Class | No | Team | Drivers | Chassis | Tyre | Laps |
| Pos | Class | No | Team | Drivers | Engine | Tyre | Laps |
|---|---|---|---|---|---|---|---|
| 1 | **SP** | 1 | (Belgium) **Peugeot Team Belgique Luxembourg** | (Belgium) **Kurt Mollekens** (Belgium) **Frédéric Bouvy** (Belgium) **Didier Defourny** | **Peugeot 306 GTi** | **D** | **478** |
| 1 | **SP** | 1 | (Belgium) **Peugeot Team Belgique Luxembourg** | (Belgium) **Kurt Mollekens** (Belgium) **Frédéric Bouvy** (Belgium) **Didier Defourny** | Peugeot 2.0L I4 | **D** | **478** |
| 2 | **N** | **25** | (Austria) **Düller Motorsport** | (Belgium) Jean-Michel Martin (Belgium) Thierry Tassin (Belgium) Frédéric Moreau | **BMW M3** | ? | **478** |
| 2 | **N** | **25** | (Austria) **Düller Motorsport** | (Belgium) Jean-Michel Martin (Belgium) Thierry Tassin (Belgium) Frédéric Moreau | BMW 3.0L I6 | ? | **478** |
| 3 | SP | 3 | (Belgium) Peugeot Team Belgique Luxembourg | (Belgium) Vanina Ickx (France) Anthony Beltoise (Belgium) Thierry van Dalen | Peugeot 306 GTi | **D** | 463 |
| 3 | SP | 3 | (Belgium) Peugeot Team Belgique Luxembourg | (Belgium) Vanina Ickx (France) Anthony Beltoise (Belgium) Thierry van Dalen | Peugeot 2.0L I4 | **D** | 463 |
| 4 | SP | 15 | (Netherlands) BPR | (Netherlands) Peter Kox (Netherlands) Cor Euser (Netherlands) Bert Ploeg | Honda Integra Type-R | **D** | 460 |
| 4 | SP | 15 | (Netherlands) BPR | (Netherlands) Peter Kox (Netherlands) Cor Euser (Netherlands) Bert Ploeg | Honda 2.0L I4 | **D** | 460 |
| 5 | N | 26 | (Austria) Düller Motorsport | (Belgium) Louis Zurstrassen (France) Eric van de Vyver (Belgium) Marc Schoonbroodt | BMW M3 | ? | 458 |
| 5 | N | 26 | (Austria) Düller Motorsport | (Belgium) Louis Zurstrassen (France) Eric van de Vyver (Belgium) Marc Schoonbroodt | BMW 3.2L I6 | ? | 458 |
| 6 | **SPD** | **12** | (Belgium) **Belgian VW Club** | (France) **Jean-François Hemroulle** (Belgium) **Tim Verbergt** (Belgium) **Fanny Duchateau** | **Volkswagen Bora TDi** | ? | **454** |
| 6 | **SPD** | **12** | (Belgium) **Belgian VW Club** | (France) **Jean-François Hemroulle** (Belgium) **Tim Verbergt** (Belgium) **Fanny Duchateau** | Volkswagen 1.9L I4 | ? | **454** |
| 7 | SP | 54 | (Belgium) Mühlner Motorsport | (Belgium) Benoit Galand (Belgium) Eric Neve (Switzerland) Peter Wyss | Opel Astra OPC | ? | 452 |
| 7 | SP | 54 | (Belgium) Mühlner Motorsport | (Belgium) Benoit Galand (Belgium) Eric Neve (Switzerland) Peter Wyss | Opel 2.0L I4 | ? | 452 |
| 8 | SP | 22 | (Belgium) PSI Motorsport | (Belgium) Damien Coens (Belgium) Alain di Duca (Germany) Wolfgang Haugg | Honda Integra Type-R | ? | 449 |
| 8 | SP | 22 | (Belgium) PSI Motorsport | (Belgium) Damien Coens (Belgium) Alain di Duca (Germany) Wolfgang Haugg | Honda 2.0L I4 | ? | 449 |
| 9 | SP | 11 | (Belgium) Ecurie Baudoin Visétoise | (Belgium) Guy Katsers (Belgium) François-Xavier Boucher (Belgium) François Turco | Alfa Romeo 156 | | 448 |
| 9 | SP | 11 | (Belgium) Ecurie Baudoin Visétoise | (Belgium) Guy Katsers (Belgium) François-Xavier Boucher (Belgium) François Turco | Alfa Romeo 2.0L I4 | | 448 |
| 10 | N | 47 | (Italy) Taverna Racing & Classic | (Italy) Valerio Leone (Switzerland) Andrea Chiesa (Belgium) Michel Heydens | BMW M3 | ? | 447 |
| 10 | N | 47 | (Italy) Taverna Racing & Classic | (Italy) Valerio Leone (Switzerland) Andrea Chiesa (Belgium) Michel Heydens | BMW 3.0L I6 | ? | 447 |
| 11 | N | 49 | (Luxembourg) Dumont J. M. | (Luxembourg) Jean-Marie Dumont (Belgium) Frédéric Schmit (Luxembourg) Nico Demuth | BMW M3 | ? | 445 |
| 11 | N | 49 | (Luxembourg) Dumont J. M. | (Luxembourg) Jean-Marie Dumont (Belgium) Frédéric Schmit (Luxembourg) Nico Demuth | BMW 3.0L I6 | ? | 445 |
| 12 | N | 37 | (United Kingdom) Gilford Racing | (United Kingdom) Ross Bygrave (United Kingdom) Tony Dunderdale (United Kingdom) Jeff Wyatt | BMW M3 | ? | 444 |
| 12 | N | 37 | (United Kingdom) Gilford Racing | (United Kingdom) Ross Bygrave (United Kingdom) Tony Dunderdale (United Kingdom) Jeff Wyatt | BMW 3.0L I6 | ? | 444 |
| 13 | N | 72 | (Italy) Luca Tassetti | (Italy) Luca Tassetti (Italy) Adriano de Micheli (Italy) Massimiliano Biancardi | Honda Integra Type-R | **D** | 441 |
| 13 | N | 72 | (Italy) Luca Tassetti | (Italy) Luca Tassetti (Italy) Adriano de Micheli (Italy) Massimiliano Biancardi | Honda 2.0L I4 | **D** | 441 |
| 14 | SP | 70 | (United Kingdom) Mardi Gras Motorsport | (Italy) Tobia Masini (United Kingdom) Stephen Day (United Kingdom) Matt Kelly | Honda Integra Type-R | **D** | 440 |
| 14 | SP | 70 | (United Kingdom) Mardi Gras Motorsport | (Italy) Tobia Masini (United Kingdom) Stephen Day (United Kingdom) Matt Kelly | Honda 2.0L I4 | **D** | 440 |
| 15 | SP | 99 | Renault Sport Belgium | (Belgium) Pierre-Yves Corthals (France) Serge Jordan (France) Jean Ragnotti | Renault Clio RS | ? | 440 |
| 15 | SP | 99 | Renault Sport Belgium | (Belgium) Pierre-Yves Corthals (France) Serge Jordan (France) Jean Ragnotti | Renault 2.0L I4 | ? | 440 |
| 16 | N | 65 | (Italy) Challenge Team | (Italy) Alberto Radaelli (Italy) Andrea Peruchetti (Italy) Luigi Moccia | Peugeot 306 16S | **M** | 438 |
| 16 | N | 65 | (Italy) Challenge Team | (Italy) Alberto Radaelli (Italy) Andrea Peruchetti (Italy) Luigi Moccia | Peugeot 2.0L I4 | **M** | 438 |
| 17 | N | 31 | (United Kingdom) Redhouse | (United Kingdom) Pete Hannen (United Kingdom) Gregor Fisken (United Kingdom) Ian Donaldson | BMW M3 | ? | 433 |
| 17 | N | 31 | (United Kingdom) Redhouse | (United Kingdom) Pete Hannen (United Kingdom) Gregor Fisken (United Kingdom) Ian Donaldson | BMW 3.0L I6 | ? | 433 |
| 18 | N | 44 | (France) Ecurie Villeneuve-les-Avignon | (Belgium) Willy Maljean (France) Alexandre Debanne (France) Michel Borens | BMW M3 | ? | 433 |
| 18 | N | 44 | (France) Ecurie Villeneuve-les-Avignon | (Belgium) Willy Maljean (France) Alexandre Debanne (France) Michel Borens | BMW 3.0L I6 | ? | 433 |
| 19 | SP | 98 | (France) JMT Racing | (Italy) Ludovico Manfredi (Belgium) Bert Lambrecht (Belgium) Rudi Stevens | BMW 320i | ? | 431 |
| 19 | SP | 98 | (France) JMT Racing | (Italy) Ludovico Manfredi (Belgium) Bert Lambrecht (Belgium) Rudi Stevens | BMW 2.0L I6 | ? | 431 |
| 20 | SP | 13 | (France) MG Racing | (France) Henri Pescarolo (Belgium) Bas Leinders (Belgium) Jean-Michel Delporte | Peugeot 306 GTi | ? | 428 |
| 20 | SP | 13 | (France) MG Racing | (France) Henri Pescarolo (Belgium) Bas Leinders (Belgium) Jean-Michel Delporte | Peugeot 2.0L I4 | ? | 428 |
| 21 | SP | 20 | (United Kingdom) Synchro Motorsport | (United Kingdom) Kevin Hicks (United Kingdom) Dave Allan (United Kingdom) Bill Stillwell | Honda Civic V-Tec | ? | 426 |
| 21 | SP | 20 | (United Kingdom) Synchro Motorsport | (United Kingdom) Kevin Hicks (United Kingdom) Dave Allan (United Kingdom) Bill Stillwell | Honda 1.6L I4 | ? | 426 |
| 22 | N | 53 | (United Kingdom) Moore International Motorsport | (United Kingdom) Jonathan Baker (United Kingdom) Dave Cox (United Kingdom) Willie Moore | BMW M3 | ? | 422 |
| 22 | N | 53 | (United Kingdom) Moore International Motorsport | (United Kingdom) Jonathan Baker (United Kingdom) Dave Cox (United Kingdom) Willie Moore | BMW 3.0L I6 | ? | 422 |
| 23 | SP | 97 | (France) Bravo | (France) Hubert Cailleton (France) Sébastien Cailleton (Belgium) Luc Deneve | BMW 320i | ? | 421 |
| 23 | SP | 97 | (France) Bravo | (France) Hubert Cailleton (France) Sébastien Cailleton (Belgium) Luc Deneve | BMW 2.0L I6 | ? | 421 |
| 24 | SP | 38 | (United States) Speed Star Racing | (United States) Mark Hein (United States) John Green (United States) Gary Blackman | Acura Integra Type R | ? | 421 |
| 24 | SP | 38 | (United States) Speed Star Racing | (United States) Mark Hein (United States) John Green (United States) Gary Blackman | Honda 2.0L I4 | ? | 421 |
| 25 | N | 52 | (United Kingdom) Alistair Davidson | (United Kingdom) Simon Duerden (United Kingdom) Alistair Davidson (United Kingdom) Chris Longmore | BMW M3 | ? | 415 |
| 25 | N | 52 | (United Kingdom) Alistair Davidson | (United Kingdom) Simon Duerden (United Kingdom) Alistair Davidson (United Kingdom) Chris Longmore | BMW 3.0L I6 | ? | 415 |
| 26 | N | 39 | (Italy) Francesco Ciani | (Italy) Francesco Ciani (Italy) Marco Polani (Belgium) Loris de Sordi | BMW M3 | ? | 414 |
| 26 | N | 39 | (Italy) Francesco Ciani | (Italy) Francesco Ciani (Italy) Marco Polani (Belgium) Loris de Sordi | BMW 3.0L I6 | ? | 414 |
| 27 | N | 43 | (France) Ecurie Villeneuve-les-Avignon | (France) Laurent Milara (France) Laurent Richard (France) Pascal Lavanchi | BMW M3 | ? | 414 |
| 27 | N | 43 | (France) Ecurie Villeneuve-les-Avignon | (France) Laurent Milara (France) Laurent Richard (France) Pascal Lavanchi | BMW 3.0L I6 | ? | 414 |
| 28 | N | 68 | (Poland) Wizja TV | (Belgium) Luc Manset (Belgium) Thierry Preumont (Belgium) Didier Noirhomme | Volkswagen Golf Mk3 | ? | 412 |
| 28 | N | 68 | (Poland) Wizja TV | (Belgium) Luc Manset (Belgium) Thierry Preumont (Belgium) Didier Noirhomme | Volkswagen 2.6L V6 | ? | 412 |
| 29 | SP | 62 | (Belgium) Ecurie Bruxelloise | (Belgium) Pierre Sevrin (Belgium) Alain Thiebaut (Belgium) Eddy Hernould | Saab 900 | ? | 409 |
| 29 | SP | 62 | (Belgium) Ecurie Bruxelloise | (Belgium) Pierre Sevrin (Belgium) Alain Thiebaut (Belgium) Eddy Hernould | Saab 2.5L V6 | ? | 409 |
| 30 | SP | 17 | (France) JMT Racing | (Belgium) Jean-Michael Taymans (Belgium) Didier Miquée (Belgium) Christophe Kerkhove | BMW 320i | ? | 409 |
| 30 | SP | 17 | (France) JMT Racing | (Belgium) Jean-Michael Taymans (Belgium) Didier Miquée (Belgium) Christophe Kerkhove | BMW 2.0L I6 | ? | 409 |
| 31 | N | 33 | (United Kingdom) Matthew Marsh | (United Kingdom) Matthew Marsh (United Kingdom) Harry Handkammer (Austria) Thomas Jakobitsch | BMW M3 | ? | 409 |
| 31 | N | 33 | (United Kingdom) Matthew Marsh | (United Kingdom) Matthew Marsh (United Kingdom) Harry Handkammer (Austria) Thomas Jakobitsch | BMW 3.2L I6 | ? | 409 |
| 32 | SPD | 82 | (Belgium) Gentse Autosport | (Belgium) Erik Crabbe (Belgium) Philippe Maertens (Belgium) Patrick Lombaerts | Audi A4 TDI | ? | 404 |
| 32 | SPD | 82 | (Belgium) Gentse Autosport | (Belgium) Erik Crabbe (Belgium) Philippe Maertens (Belgium) Patrick Lombaerts | Audi 2.5L V6 | ? | 404 |
| 33 | N | 78 | (Belgium) EBRT | (Belgium) Jacky Delvaux (Belgium) Lionel Jaminet (Belgium) Pierre Chaudoir | Renault Clio | ? | 403 |
| 33 | N | 78 | (Belgium) EBRT | (Belgium) Jacky Delvaux (Belgium) Lionel Jaminet (Belgium) Pierre Chaudoir | Renault 2.0L I4 | ? | 403 |
| 34 | N | 42 | (France) Ecurie Villeneuve-les-Avignon | (France) Jean-Luc Blanchemain (Belgium) Roger Visconti (United Kingdom) Jean-Pierre Glath | BMW M3 | ? | 403 |
| 34 | N | 42 | (France) Ecurie Villeneuve-les-Avignon | (France) Jean-Luc Blanchemain (Belgium) Roger Visconti (United Kingdom) Jean-Pierre Glath | BMW 3.2L I6 | ? | 403 |
| 35 | SPD | 83 | (Belgium) Ecurie Azur | (Belgium) Thierry de Bonhome (Belgium) Alain Derette (Belgium) Marc Theunissen | SEAT Ibiza GT TDI | ? | 398 |
| 35 | SPD | 83 | (Belgium) Ecurie Azur | (Belgium) Thierry de Bonhome (Belgium) Alain Derette (Belgium) Marc Theunissen | SEAT 1.9L I4 | ? | 398 |
| 36 | SP | 64 | (Belgium) Ecure Bruxelloise | (Belgium) Xavier de Saeger (Belgium) Didier de Saeger (Belgium) Michel Schmitz | Suzuki Baleno | ? | 393 |
| 36 | SP | 64 | (Belgium) Ecure Bruxelloise | (Belgium) Xavier de Saeger (Belgium) Didier de Saeger (Belgium) Michel Schmitz | Suzuki 1.8L I4 | ? | 393 |
| 37 | SP | 28 | (Belgium) Gentse Motorsport | (Belgium) Bert Redant (Belgium) Pierre-Olivier Businaro (Belgium) Lionel de Leener | Opel Vectra | ? | 387 |
| 37 | SP | 28 | (Belgium) Gentse Motorsport | (Belgium) Bert Redant (Belgium) Pierre-Olivier Businaro (Belgium) Lionel de Leener | Opel 2.0L I4 | ? | 387 |
| 38 | N | 76 | (Belgium) EBRT | (Belgium) Didier Flohimont (Belgium) René Marin (Belgium) Didier de Potter (Serbia) Igor Ljubas | Renault Clio | ? | 379 |
| 38 | N | 76 | (Belgium) EBRT | (Belgium) Didier Flohimont (Belgium) René Marin (Belgium) Didier de Potter (Serbia) Igor Ljubas | Renault 2.0L I4 | ? | 379 |
| NC | SP | 29 | (Belgium) Gentse Autosport | (Belgium) Philippe Eliard (Belgium) Amaury Heurckmans (Belgium) Philippe Ménage | Opel Vectra | ? | 407 |
| NC | SP | 29 | (Belgium) Gentse Autosport | (Belgium) Philippe Eliard (Belgium) Amaury Heurckmans (Belgium) Philippe Ménage | Opel 2.0L I4 | ? | 407 |
| DNF | SP | 4 | (Germany) BMW Fina | (Belgium) Marc Duez (Belgium) Vincent Vosse (Netherlands) Patrick Huisman | BMW 320i | ? | ? |
| DNF | SP | 4 | (Germany) BMW Fina | (Belgium) Marc Duez (Belgium) Vincent Vosse (Netherlands) Patrick Huisman | BMW 2.0L I6 | ? | ? |
| DNF | SP | 21 | (Belgium) PSI Motorsport | (Belgium) Stéphane De Groodt (Belgium) Éric Bachelart (Finland) Markus Palttala | Honda Integra Type-R | ? | ? |
| DNF | SP | 21 | (Belgium) PSI Motorsport | (Belgium) Stéphane De Groodt (Belgium) Éric Bachelart (Finland) Markus Palttala | Honda 2.0L I4 | ? | ? |
| DNF | SP | 5 | (Belgium) LO Racing | (Belgium) Sébastien Ugeux (Belgium) Martial Chouvel (Belgium) Geoffroy Horion | Alfa Romeo 156 | ? | ? |
| DNF | SP | 5 | (Belgium) LO Racing | (Belgium) Sébastien Ugeux (Belgium) Martial Chouvel (Belgium) Geoffroy Horion | Alfa Romeo 2.0L I4 | ? | ? |
| DNF | SP | 2 | (Belgium) Peugeot Team Belgique Luxembourg | (Belgium) Vincent Radermecker (Belgium) Jeffrey van Hooydonk (Belgium) Eric van de Poele | Peugeot 306 GTI | **D** | ? |
| DNF | SP | 2 | (Belgium) Peugeot Team Belgique Luxembourg | (Belgium) Vincent Radermecker (Belgium) Jeffrey van Hooydonk (Belgium) Eric van de Poele | Peugeot 2.0L I4 | **D** | ? |
| DNF | SP | 7 | (United Kingdom) ELR & Barwell Motorsport | (Italy) Gabriele Tarquini (Denmark) Tom Kristensen (Belgium) Philippe Tollenaire | Honda Accord | ? | ? |
| DNF | SP | 7 | (United Kingdom) ELR & Barwell Motorsport | (Italy) Gabriele Tarquini (Denmark) Tom Kristensen (Belgium) Philippe Tollenaire | Honda 2.0L I4 | ? | ? |
| DNF | SP | 10 | (Germany) BMW Fina | (Belgium) Grégoire de Mévius (Belgium) David Saelens (Germany) Thomas Winkelhock | BMW 320i | ? | ? |
| DNF | SP | 10 | (Germany) BMW Fina | (Belgium) Grégoire de Mévius (Belgium) David Saelens (Germany) Thomas Winkelhock | BMW 2.0L I6 | ? | ? |
| DNF | SP | 57 | (Germany) Kissling Motorsport | (Belgium) Nicolas Kropp (Belgium) Luigi Vroman (Germany) Stefan Kissling | Opel Astra OPC | ? | ? |
| DNF | SP | 57 | (Germany) Kissling Motorsport | (Belgium) Nicolas Kropp (Belgium) Luigi Vroman (Germany) Stefan Kissling | Opel 2.0L I4 | ? | ? |
| DNF | SP | 8 | (United Kingdom) ELR & Barwell Motorsport | (United Kingdom) David Leslie (United Kingdom) James Kaye (United Kingdom) Mark Lemmer | Honda Accord | ? | ? |
| DNF | SP | 8 | (United Kingdom) ELR & Barwell Motorsport | (United Kingdom) David Leslie (United Kingdom) James Kaye (United Kingdom) Mark Lemmer | Honda 2.0L I4 | ? | ? |
| DNF | N | 51 | (Italy) Max Team | (Italy) Sandro Sardelli (Italy) Paolo Zadra (Italy) Walter Meloni | BMW M3 | ? | ? |
| DNF | N | 51 | (Italy) Max Team | (Italy) Sandro Sardelli (Italy) Paolo Zadra (Italy) Walter Meloni | BMW 3.0L I6 | ? | ? |
| DNF | SP | 9 | (Germany) BMW Fina | (Belgium) Frédéric Baugnée (Belgium) Eric Jamar (Belgium) Sylvie Delcour | BMW 320i | | |
| DNF | SP | 9 | (Germany) BMW Fina | (Belgium) Frédéric Baugnée (Belgium) Eric Jamar (Belgium) Sylvie Delcour | BMW 2.0L I6 | | |
| DNF | SP | 23 | (United Kingdom) RJN Motorsport | (Belgium) Stéphane Lémeret (United Kingdom) Chris Buncombe (Norway) Tommy Rustad | Nissan Primera | ? | ? |
| DNF | SP | 23 | (United Kingdom) RJN Motorsport | (Belgium) Stéphane Lémeret (United Kingdom) Chris Buncombe (Norway) Tommy Rustad | Nissan 2.0L I4 | ? | ? |
| DNF | SP | 6 | (Belgium) LO Racing | (Belgium) Larry Cols (France) Sylvain Noël (Belgium) Stefan van Campenhoudt | Alfa Romeo 156 | ? | ? |
| DNF | SP | 6 | (Belgium) LO Racing | (Belgium) Larry Cols (France) Sylvain Noël (Belgium) Stefan van Campenhoudt | Alfa Romeo 2.0L I4 | ? | ? |
| DNF | N | 48 | (Italy) Taverna Racing & Classic | (Italy) Alex Caffi (Italy) Beppe Gabbiani (Italy) Ettore Bonaldi | BMW M3 | ? | ? |
| DNF | N | 48 | (Italy) Taverna Racing & Classic | (Italy) Alex Caffi (Italy) Beppe Gabbiani (Italy) Ettore Bonaldi | BMW 3.0L I6 | ? | ? |
| DNF | N | 34 | (Germany) Automobil Club München | (New Zealand) Rod Hicks (New Zealand) Kevin Bell (Germany) Alfrid Hilger | BMW M3 | ? | ? |
| DNF | N | 34 | (Germany) Automobil Club München | (New Zealand) Rod Hicks (New Zealand) Kevin Bell (Germany) Alfrid Hilger | BMW 3.0L I6 | ? | ? |
| DNF | N | 32 | (United Kingdom) Ian Khan | (United Kingdom) Adrian Willmott (United Kingdom) Ian Khan (United Kingdom) Mark Peters | BMW M3 | | ? |
| DNF | N | 32 | (United Kingdom) Ian Khan | (United Kingdom) Adrian Willmott (United Kingdom) Ian Khan (United Kingdom) Mark Peters | BMW 3.0L I6 | | ? |
| DNF | N | 30 | (United Kingdom) Redhouse | (United Kingdom) Howard Redhouse (United Kingdom) Stuart Wright (United Kingdom) Arthur Atkinson | BMW M3 | ? | ? |
| DNF | N | 30 | (United Kingdom) Redhouse | (United Kingdom) Howard Redhouse (United Kingdom) Stuart Wright (United Kingdom) Arthur Atkinson | BMW 3.0L I6 | ? | ? |
| DNF | N | 35 | (Belgium) EBRT | (Belgium) Jean-Pierre Blaise (Belgium) Bernard Crouquet (Belgium) Jean-Louis Raxhon | BMW M3 | ? | ? |
| DNF | N | 35 | (Belgium) EBRT | (Belgium) Jean-Pierre Blaise (Belgium) Bernard Crouquet (Belgium) Jean-Louis Raxhon | BMW 3.0L I6 | ? | ? |
| DNF | SP | 14 | (France) MG Racing | (France) Marc Rostan (France) Pierre Petit (France) Jean-Bernard Bouvet | Peugeot 306 GTI | ? | ? |
| DNF | SP | 14 | (France) MG Racing | (France) Marc Rostan (France) Pierre Petit (France) Jean-Bernard Bouvet | Peugeot 2.0L I4 | ? | ? |
| DNF | N | 24 | (Austria) Düller Motorsport | (Belgium) Anthony Kumpen (Belgium) Jérôme Thiry (Belgium) Carlo Geeraedts | BMW M3 | ? | ? |
| DNF | N | 24 | (Austria) Düller Motorsport | (Belgium) Anthony Kumpen (Belgium) Jérôme Thiry (Belgium) Carlo Geeraedts | BMW 3.2L I6 | ? | ? |
| DNF | N | 75 | (United Kingdom) Team Jota | (United Kingdom) John Stack (United Kingdom) Sam Hignett (United Kingdom) Gavin Pickering | Honda Integra Type-R | ? | ? |
| DNF | N | 75 | (United Kingdom) Team Jota | (United Kingdom) John Stack (United Kingdom) Sam Hignett (United Kingdom) Gavin Pickering | Honda 1.8L I4 | ? | ? |
| DNF | SP | 18 | (Belgium) Gurzo Racing | (Italy) Giovanni Bruno (Belgium) Pierre Bousson (Belgium) Peter Gurzo | Honda Integra Type-R | ? | ? |
| DNF | SP | 18 | (Belgium) Gurzo Racing | (Italy) Giovanni Bruno (Belgium) Pierre Bousson (Belgium) Peter Gurzo | Honda 1.8L I4 | ? | ? |
| DNF | SP | 55 | (Germany) Mühlner Motorsport | (Germany) Wolfgang Sevelsbergh (Germany) Heinz-Josef Bermes (Germany) Marco Werner | Opel Astra OPC | ? | ? |
| DNF | SP | 55 | (Germany) Mühlner Motorsport | (Germany) Wolfgang Sevelsbergh (Germany) Heinz-Josef Bermes (Germany) Marco Werner | Opel 2.2L I4 | ? | ? |
| DNF | N | 46 | (Germany) MSC Adenau | (Belgium) Alain Goffin (Belgium) Michel Plennevaux (Belgium) Jean-Paul Libert | BMW M3 | ? | ? |
| DNF | N | 46 | (Germany) MSC Adenau | (Belgium) Alain Goffin (Belgium) Michel Plennevaux (Belgium) Jean-Paul Libert | BMW 3.0L I6 | ? | ? |
| DNF | N | 45 | (Japan) Kimoto Racing Team | (Japan) Masahiro Kimoto (United Kingdom) Dave Karaskas (Belgium) Paul Simons | BMW M3 | ? | ? |
| DNF | N | 45 | (Japan) Kimoto Racing Team | (Japan) Masahiro Kimoto (United Kingdom) Dave Karaskas (Belgium) Paul Simons | BMW 3.0L I6 | ? | ? |
| DNF | SP | 27 | (Belgium) EBRT | (Luxembourg) Christophe Geoffroy (Belgium) Vincent Grignard (Belgium) Eric Gressens | BMW 320i | ? | ? |
| DNF | SP | 27 | (Belgium) EBRT | (Luxembourg) Christophe Geoffroy (Belgium) Vincent Grignard (Belgium) Eric Gressens | BMW 2.0L I6 | ? | ? |
| DNF | SP | 77 | (Belgium) Ecurie Bruxelloise | (Belgium) Eric Allegaert (Belgium) Frédérick Colaux (Belgium) Franck Colaux | Peugeot 306 GTi | ? | ? |
| DNF | SP | 77 | (Belgium) Ecurie Bruxelloise | (Belgium) Eric Allegaert (Belgium) Frédérick Colaux (Belgium) Franck Colaux | Peugeot 2.0L I4 | ? | ? |
| DNF | SP | 63 | (France) Ecurie Le Perron | (France) Ludovic Simon (France) Patrick Gonin (France) Philippe Haezebrouck | Renault Mégane | ? | ? |
| DNF | SP | 63 | (France) Ecurie Le Perron | (France) Ludovic Simon (France) Patrick Gonin (France) Philippe Haezebrouck | Renault 2.0L I4 | ? | ? |
| DNF | N | 41 | (France) Ecurie Villeneuve-les-Avignon | (France) Gérard Tremblay (France) Christian Tant (France) Francis Maillet | BMW M3 | ? | ? |
| DNF | N | 41 | (France) Ecurie Villeneuve-les-Avignon | (France) Gérard Tremblay (France) Christian Tant (France) Francis Maillet | BMW 3.0L I6 | ? | ? |
| DNF | SP | 59 | (Belgium) Patrick Racing | (Belgium) Pascal Witmeur (Belgium) Pierre van Vilet (France) Christophe Giltaire | Peugeot 306 16S | ? | ? |
| DNF | SP | 59 | (Belgium) Patrick Racing | (Belgium) Pascal Witmeur (Belgium) Pierre van Vilet (France) Christophe Giltaire | Peugeot 2.0L I4 | ? | ? |
| DNF | SP | 19 | (Belgium) Spork Racing Team | (Belgium) Ronny De Lannoy (Belgium) Herman Adriaenssens (Belgium) Georges Colman | Volkswagen Golf Mk3 | ? | ? |
| DNF | SP | 19 | (Belgium) Spork Racing Team | (Belgium) Ronny De Lannoy (Belgium) Herman Adriaenssens (Belgium) Georges Colman | Volkswagen 2.6L V6 | ? | ? |
| DNF | SP | 66 | (Belgium) Ecurie Bruxelloise | (Belgium) Pascal Vandeput (Belgium) Philippe Houtmans (Belgium) Luc Havelange | Honda Integra Type-R | ? | ? |
| DNF | SP | 66 | (Belgium) Ecurie Bruxelloise | (Belgium) Pascal Vandeput (Belgium) Philippe Houtmans (Belgium) Luc Havelange | Honda 1.8L I4 | ? | ? |
| DNF | SP | 58 | (France) GZ Team | (France) Sébastien Giltaire (France) Richard Labro (France) Michel Carle | Peugeot 306 16S | ? | ? |
| DNF | SP | 58 | (France) GZ Team | (France) Sébastien Giltaire (France) Richard Labro (France) Michel Carle | Peugeot 2.0L I4 | ? | ? |
| DNF | N | 73 | (Belgium) Racing Car Mosan | (Belgium) Michel Wilders (Belgium) Catherine Liegeois (Belgium) Alexandre Leens | Honda Integra Type-R | ? | ? |
| DNF | N | 73 | (Belgium) Racing Car Mosan | (Belgium) Michel Wilders (Belgium) Catherine Liegeois (Belgium) Alexandre Leens | Honda 1.8L I4 | ? | ? |
| DNF | N | 74 | (United Kingdom) Quartz Racing | (United Kingdom) Del Delaronde (United Kingdom) Peter Morss (Belgium) Paul Michael | Honda Integra Type-R | ? | ? |
| DNF | N | 74 | (United Kingdom) Quartz Racing | (United Kingdom) Del Delaronde (United Kingdom) Peter Morss (Belgium) Paul Michael | Honda 1.8L I4 | ? | ? |
| DNF | SP | 69 | (Belgium) Peter Gurzo | (Belgium) Marc Voussure (Belgium) Jean-Pierre Baudart (Belgium) Alain Ronchail | Honda Civic | ? | ? |
| DNF | SP | 69 | (Belgium) Peter Gurzo | (Belgium) Marc Voussure (Belgium) Jean-Pierre Baudart (Belgium) Alain Ronchail | Honda 1.6L I4 | ? | ? |
| DNF | N | 79 | (France) Savoie | (France) Jean-Luc Crétier (France) Henri Leconte (France) Christophe Couvert | Renault Clio | ? | ? |
| DNF | N | 79 | (France) Savoie | (France) Jean-Luc Crétier (France) Henri Leconte (France) Christophe Couvert | Renault 2.0L I4 | ? | ? |
| DNF | N | 67 | (Poland) Wizja TV | (Belgium) Olivier de Wilde (Belgium) Claude Corthals (Belgium) David Sterckx | Volkswagen Golf Mk3 | ? | ? |
| DNF | N | 67 | (Poland) Wizja TV | (Belgium) Olivier de Wilde (Belgium) Claude Corthals (Belgium) David Sterckx | Volkswagen 2.8L V6 | ? | ? |
| DNF | N | 36 | (Belgium) EBRT | (Belgium) Marc Lander (Belgium) Lino Pecoraro (Belgium) Serge Hercek-Pilek | Honda Integra Type-R | ? | ? |
| DNF | N | 36 | (Belgium) EBRT | (Belgium) Marc Lander (Belgium) Lino Pecoraro (Belgium) Serge Hercek-Pilek | Honda 1.8L I4 | ? | ? |
| DNF | SPD | 85 | (Netherlands) Eurotech / HP Team | (Netherlands) Rob Knook (Netherlands) Leon Bastiaens (Netherlands) Huub Vermeulen | SEAT Ibiza TDI | ? | ? |
| DNF | SPD | 85 | (Netherlands) Eurotech / HP Team | (Netherlands) Rob Knook (Netherlands) Leon Bastiaens (Netherlands) Huub Vermeulen | SEAT 1.9L I4 | ? | ? |
| DNF | N | 71 | (Japan) Kimoto Racing Team | (Japan) Akira Yoshimoto (Japan) Toshihisa Kouno (Belgium) Jozef van Samang | Honda Integra Type-R | ? | ? |
| DNF | N | 71 | (Japan) Kimoto Racing Team | (Japan) Akira Yoshimoto (Japan) Toshihisa Kouno (Belgium) Jozef van Samang | Honda 1.8L I4 | ? | ? |
| DNF | SP | 61 | (Belgium) Excelsior Antwerpen | (Belgium) Luc Meeusen (Belgium) Dirk van Rompuy (Belgium) Patrick Schreurs | Saab 9-3 Viggen | ? | ? |
| DNF | SP | 61 | (Belgium) Excelsior Antwerpen | (Belgium) Luc Meeusen (Belgium) Dirk van Rompuy (Belgium) Patrick Schreurs | Saab 2.3L I4 | ? | ? |
| DNF | SPD | 84 | (Netherlands) Eurotech / HP Team | (Netherlands) Peter van der Kolk (Netherlands) Herman Buurman (Netherlands) Wim Noorman | SEAT Ibiza TDI | ? | ? |
| DNF | SPD | 84 | (Netherlands) Eurotech / HP Team | (Netherlands) Peter van der Kolk (Netherlands) Herman Buurman (Netherlands) Wim Noorman | SEAT 1.9L I4 | ? | ? |
| DNF | N | 80 | (Belgium) Ecurie Baudouin Visétoise | (Belgium) Robert Matot (Belgium) Jérôme Naveaux (United Kingdom) Andrew Delahunty | Citroën Xsara | ? | ? |
| DNF | N | 80 | (Belgium) Ecurie Baudouin Visétoise | (Belgium) Robert Matot (Belgium) Jérôme Naveaux (United Kingdom) Andrew Delahunty | Citroën 2.0L I4 | ? | ? |
