= 1975 Japanese Grand Prix =

- Race 1 of 5 in the 1975 All-Japan Formula 2000 championship

Race details
- Date: 4 May 1975
- Official name: '75 Japanese Grand Prix
- Location: Fuji Speedway, Oyama, Shizuoka Prefecture
- Course: Permanent racing facility
- Course length: 4.3 km (2.7 miles)
- Distance: 35 laps, 150.5 km (93.5 miles)
- Weather: Wet
- Attendance: 41,000

Pole position
Driver	(Japan) Masahiro Hasemi	March-BMW
- Time: 1:26.89

Fastest lap
Driver	(N/A) Unknown	Unknown
- Time: Unknown

Podium
First	(Japan) Masahiro Hasemi	March-BMW
Second	(Japan) Noritake Takahara	March-BMW
Third	(United Kingdom) Brian Henton	March-BMW

The 1975 Japanese Grand Prix was held at Fuji Speedway from 3 to 4 May 1975.

== Touring car race ==
=== TS/GTS-A ===
==== Race classification ====
Pos.	No.	Driver	Car	Laps	Time/Retired	Grid
1	17	(Japan) Nobuhide Tachi	Toyota Starlet	20	35:25.51	1
2	11	(Japan) Naoki Nagasaka	Nissan Sunny Coupé	20	+0.69	5
3	14	(Japan) Kenichi Takeshita	Toyota Starlet	20	+13.15	16

- Pole position: Nobuhide Tachi, 1:34.97

=== TS/GTS-B ===
==== Race classification ====
Pos.	No.	Driver	Car	Laps	Time/Retired	Grid
1	77	(Japan) Yoshimi Katayama	Mazda Savanna RX-3	20	31:52.16	1
2	9	(Japan) Yoshinori Ihara	Mazda Savanna RX-3	20	+10.08	2
3	5	(Japan) Yojiro Terada	Mazda Savanna RX-3	20	+13.44	3

- Pole position: Yoshimi Katayama, 1:36.11

== Formula car race ==
=== FL500 ===
31 cars took part in qualifying for the FL500 race, 29 cars took to the start, and 19 finished the race. The first four drivers were the only ones to complete all 15 laps.

==== Race classification ====
Pos.	No.	Driver	Chassis-Engine	Laps	Time/Retired	Grid
1	30	(Japan) Takashi Yamamoto	KE-Suzuki	15	30:28.71	1
2	11	(Japan) Satoru Nakajima	West-Suzuki	15	+25.16	3
3	20	(Japan) Haruto Yanagida	Capricious-Suzuki	15	+1:01.26	4

- Pole position: Takashi Yamamoto, 1:45.54

=== All-Japan FJ1300 championship race ===
==== Race classification ====
Pos.	No.	Driver	Chassis-Engine	Laps	Time/Retired	Grid
1	10	(Japan) Masahiro Hasemi	March-Nissan	20	38:22.87	1
2	19	(Japan) Yasuaki Mori	March-Nissan	20	+5.93	7
3	5	(Japan) Naoshi Sugisaki	March-Mugen	20	+37.57	6

- Pole position: Masahiro Hasemi, 1:34.66

=== All-Japan Formula 2000 championship race ===
==== Entry list ====
Team	No.	Driver	Chassis	Engine	Tyre
Sakai Racing Team	1	(Japan) Masahiro Hasemi	March 742	BMW M12	B
Sakai Racing Team	2	(Japan) Kunimitsu Takahashi	Surtees TS15	Ford BDA	B
Takahara Racing Co., Ltd.	3	(Japan) Noritake Takahara	March 742	BMW M12	B
Japan Racing Development	4	(Japan) Moto Kitano	Brabham BT40	BMW M12	D
Japan Racing Development	11	(Japan) Kenji Tohira	Brabham BT40	Ford BDA	D
Victory Circle Club	5	(United Kingdom) Brian Henton	March 742	BMW M12	B
Victory Circle Club	6	(United Kingdom) Peter Gethin	March 752	BMW M12	B
Victory Circle Club	8	(Japan) Kuniomi Nagamatsu	March 742	Mitsubibshi R39BII	B
ISCC Team J.K.	9	(Japan) Shigeaki Asaoka	Brabham BT36	Ford BDA	Y
Fushida Racers	18	(Japan) Hiroshi Fushida	March 752	BMW M12	D
Hickok Racing Team	50	(Japan) Jiro Yoneyama	Surtees TS15	Ford BDA	D
Tomohiko Tsutsumi	55	(Japan) Tomohiko Tsutsumi	March 732	Ford BDA	D
Team Phoenix	88	(Japan) Naohiro Fujita	Nova 02	BMW M12	D

==== Classification ====
===== Qualifying classification =====
Pos.	No.	Driver	Team	Chassis-Engine	Time	Gap
1	1	(Japan) Masahiro Hasemi	Sakai Racing Team	March-BMW	1:26.89	
2	2	(Japan) Kunimitsu Takahashi	Sakai Racing Team	Surtees-Ford	1:27.72	+0.83
3	5	(United Kingdom) Brian Henton	Victory Circle Club	March-BMW	1:28.10	+1.21
4	3	(Japan) Noritake Takahara	Takahara Racing	March-BMW	1:28.20	+1.31
5	8	(Japan) Kuniomi Nagamatsu	Victory Circle Club	March-Mitsubishi	1:29.29	+2.40
6	4	(Japan) Moto Kitano	Japan Racing Development	Brabham-Ford	1:31.76	+4.87
7	6	(United Kingdom) Peter Gethin	Victory Circle Club	March-BMW	1:33.36	+6.47
8	50	(Japan) Jiro Yoneyama	Hickok Racing Team	Surtees-Ford	1:34.65	+7.76
9	18	(Japan) Hiroshi Fushida	Fushida Racers	March-BMW	1:34.87	+7.98
10	88	(Japan) Naohiro Fujita	Team Phoenix	Nova-BMW	1:35.41	+8.52
11	9	(Japan) Shigeaki Asaoka	ISCC Team J.K.	Brabham-Ford	1:39.23	+12.34
12	55	(Japan) Tomohiko Tsutsumi	Tomohiko Tsutsumi	March-Ford	1:39.38	+12.49
13	11	(Japan) Kenji Tohira	Japan Racing Development	Brabham-Ford	1:42.37	+15.48

===== Race classification =====
Pos.	No.	Driver	Team	Chassis-Engine	Laps	Time/Retired	Grid	Points
1	1	(Japan) Masahiro Hasemi	Sakai Racing Team	March-BMW	35	51:39.94	1	20
2	3	(Japan) Noritake Takahara	Takahara Racing	March-BMW	35	+11.61	4	15
3	5	(United Kingdom) Brian Henton	Victory Circle Club	March-BMW	35	+16.53	3	Not awarded
4	8	(Japan) Kuniomi Nagamatsu	Victory Circle Club	March-Mitsubibshi	35	+1:12.73	5	12
5	18	(Japan) Hiroshi Fushida	Fushida Racers	March-BMW	34	+1 lap	9	10
6	50	(Japan) Jiro Yoneyama	Hickok Racing Team	Surtees-Ford	34	+1 lap	8	8
7	55	(Japan) Tomohiko Tsutsumi	Tomohiko Tsutsumi	March-Ford	33	+2 laps	12	6
8	6	(United Kingdom) Peter Gethin	Victory Circle Club	March-BMW	32	+3 laps	7	Not awarded
9	9	(Japan) Shigeaki Asaoka	ISCC Team J.K.	Brabham-Ford	32	+3 laps	11	4
10	88	(Japan) Naohiro Fujita	Team Phoenix	Nova-BMW	32	+3 laps	10	3
11	11	(Japan) Kenji Tohira	Japan Racing Development	Brabham-Ford	32	+3 laps	13	2
DNF	4	(Japan) Moto Kitano	Japan Racing Development	Brabham-Ford	0	Accident	6	
DNS	2	(Japan) Kunimitsu Takahashi	Sakai Racing Team	Surtees-Ford	0	Unknown	2	

- Average speed of pole position driver: 178.1 km/h
- Average speed of winning driver: 174.4 km/h
