= Masami Kuwashima =

Japanese racing driver (born 1950)

- Born: 14 September 1950 (age 76); Kumagaya, Saitama, Japan

Formula One World Championship career
- Nationality: (Japan) Japanese
- Active years: 1976
- Team: Wolf–Williams
- Entries: 1 (0 starts)
- Championships: 0
- Wins: 0
- Podiums: 0
- Career points: 0
- Pole positions: 0
- Fastest laps: 0
- First entry: 1976 Japanese Grand Prix

Masami Kuwashima (桑島 正美; born 14 September 1950) is a former racing driver from Japan.

== Career ==
Kuwashima was initially supposed to drive a Brabham BT44 in the 1976 Japanese Grand Prix with the RAM team, but the car was unavailable after it had been impounded at the German Grand Prix in August. Kuwashima subsequently found a seat for the race with the then-struggling Wolf–Williams Racing team, driving a Wolf–Williams FW05.

Kuwashima took part in the first two qualifying sessions for the race, and posted a time of 1:17.90 in the first session on the Friday morning, which was 23rd fastest of the 26 entrants, ahead of Hans-Joachim Stuck, Tony Trimmer and Harald Ertl. In the afternoon session, he was unable to improve, posting a time of 1:19.27. Trimmer and Masahiro Hasemi did not participate in this second session, so Kuwashima placed 24th, the slowest runner in the session. Stuck and Ertl improved their times, so overall, Kuwashima was lying 25th of the 26 entrants at the end of Friday's running, ahead only of Trimmer.

This caused Kuwashima's sponsors to withdraw their financing of the Williams deal, and Frank Williams promptly replaced him with Austrian Hans Binder for the third qualifying session and the race itself. Binder had previously driven for Ensign at the Austrian Grand Prix that year. In the third qualifying session, Binder posted a time of 1:17.36, just over half a second faster than Kuwashima, but still placed 25th overall. With only 24 entrants due to start the race, Williams had to ask permission from the other teams for Binder to take part, which he received, although the car retired from the race on lap 49 with a wheel bearing failure.

Kuwashima was not to have another chance in Formula One, and he returned to the Japanese Formula 2000 and Formula Two series where he spent the rest of his career. Continuing to struggle for sponsorship, he ended his single-seater career in 1979. He later worked as a team director in the Japanese GT Championship in the early 2000s, and worked as a stunt driver for films and television.

== Complete Formula One results ==
(key)

| Year | Entrant | Chassis | Engine | 1 | 2 | 3 | 4 | 5 | 6 | 7 | 8 | 9 | 10 | 11 | 12 | 13 | 14 | 15 | 16 | WDC | Pts |
|---|---|---|---|---|---|---|---|---|---|---|---|---|---|---|---|---|---|---|---|---|---|
| 1976 | Walter Wolf Racing | Wolf–Williams FW05 | Ford Cosworth DFV 3.0 V8 | BRA | RSA | USW | ESP | MON | BEL | SWE | FRA | GBR | GER | AUT | NED | ITA | USA | CAN | JPN; DNS | NC | 0 |
