= Masahiro Hasemi =

Japanese racing driver (born 1945)

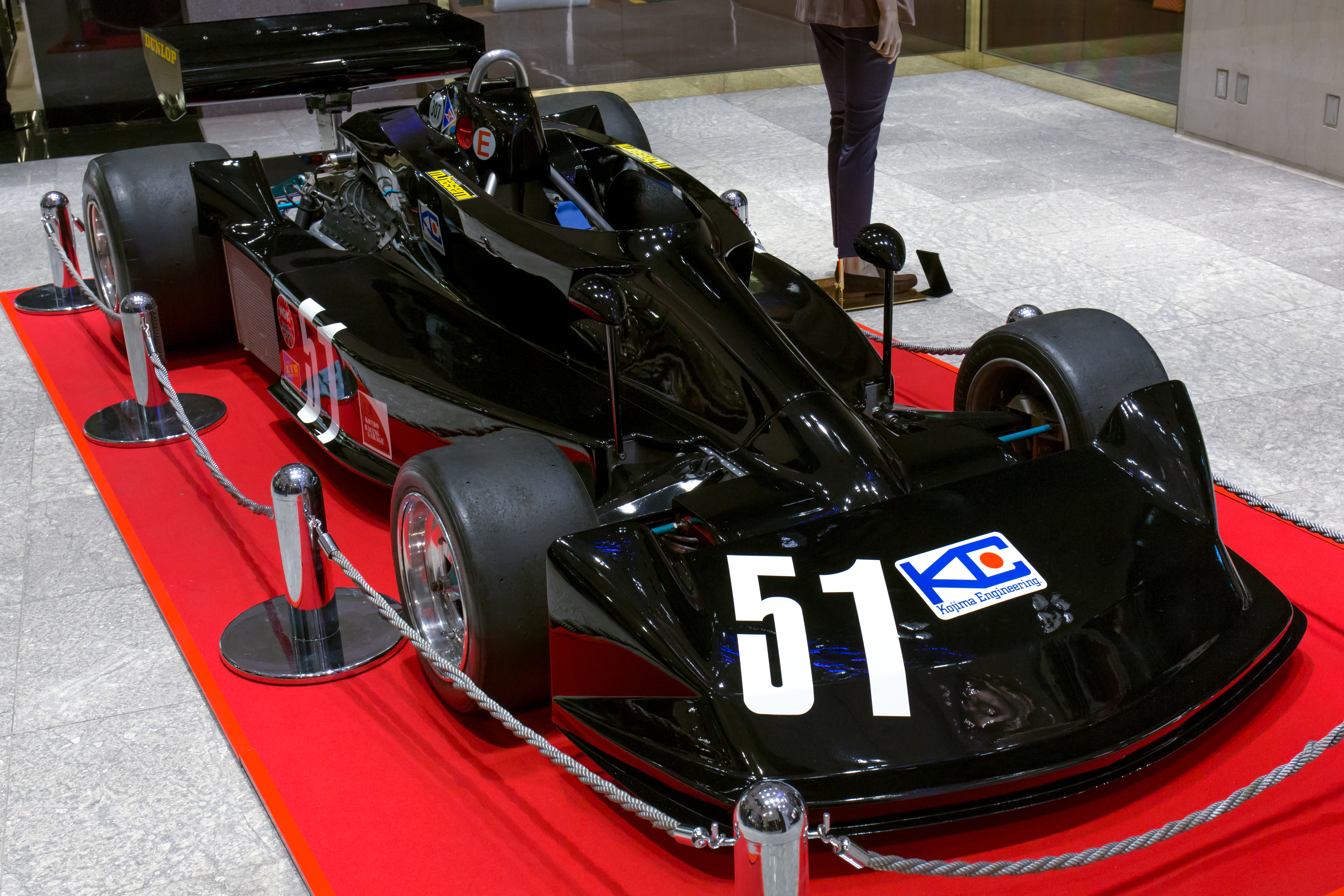
- Hasemi's former Kojima KE007 on display at Yurakucho Marion in 2013
- Born: 13 November 1945 (age 81); Tokyo, Japan

Formula One World Championship career
- Nationality: (Japan) Japanese
- Active years: 1976
- Team: Kojima
- Entries: 1
- Championships: 0
- Wins: 0
- Podiums: 0
- Career points: 0
- Pole positions: 0
- Fastest laps: 0^{1}
- First entry: 1976 Japanese Grand Prix

Masahiro Hasemi (Shinjitai: 長谷見 昌弘, Hasemi Masahiro; born 13 November 1945) is a former racing driver and team owner from Japan.

== Career ==
He started racing motocross when he was 15 years old. In 1964 he signed to drive for Nissan. After establishing himself in saloon car and GT races in Japan, he notably entered two rounds of the 1973 British Saloon Car Championship. He took part in his only Formula One race at the 1976 Japanese Grand Prix for Kojima on 24 October 1976. He qualified tenth after an error which cost him his chance of a pole position and finished 11th, seven laps behind the winner. Contrary to a widely propagated but mistaken result, however, he never set a fastest lap in a Formula One championship race.^{1} Along with compatriots Noritake Takahara and Kazuyoshi Hoshino, he was the first Japanese driver to start a Formula One Grand Prix.

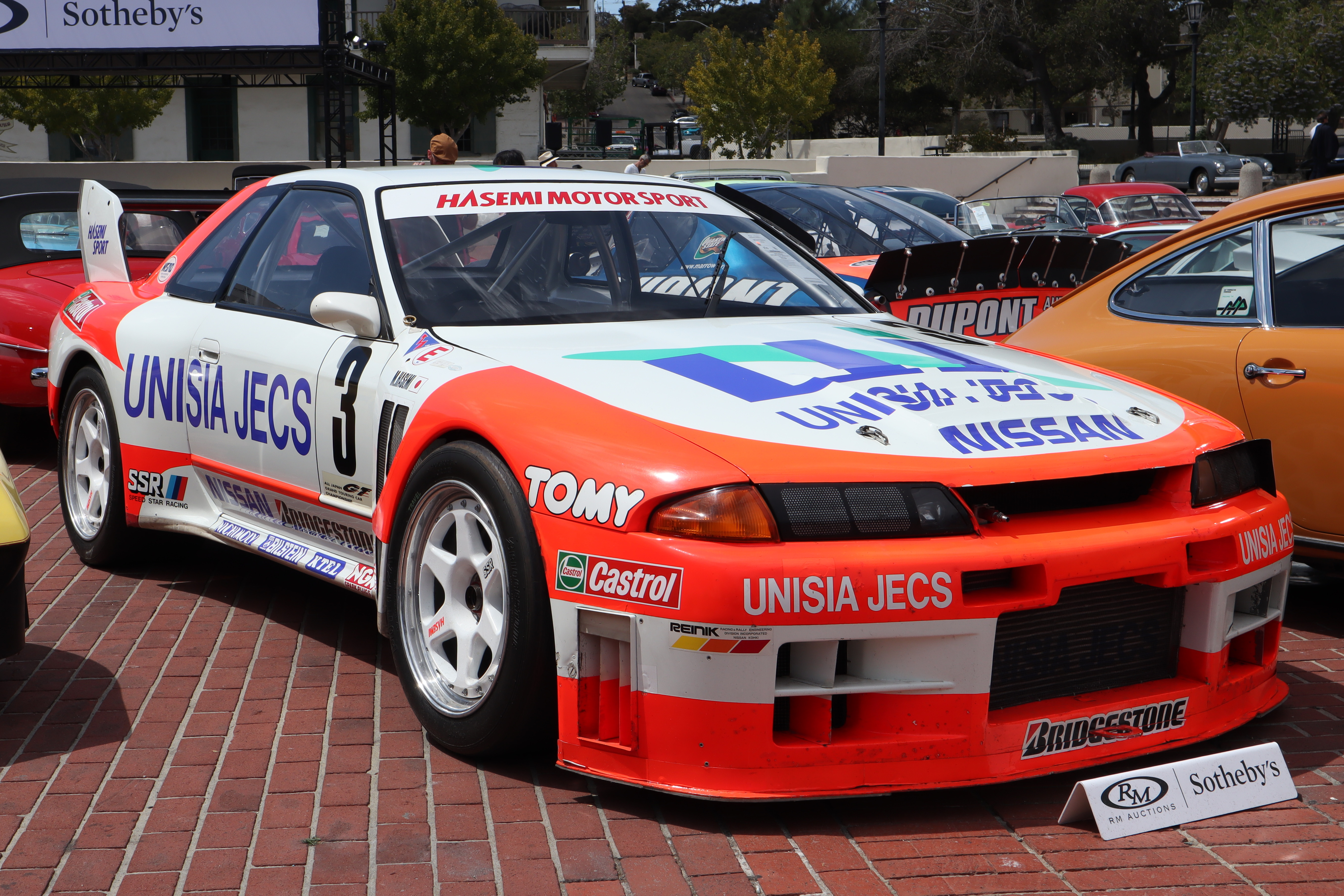
1994 Nissan Skyline GT-R prepared by Hasemi Motorsport and driven by Masahiro Hasemi in the 1994 JGTC season

Hasemi became the Japanese Formula 2 Champion in 1980, and got two titles in the Fuji Grand Champion Series in 1974 and 1980. After that he reverted to racing Skylines, which he became heavily synonymous with in Group 5, touring cars and JGTC. He won the Japanese Touring Car Championship in 1989, 1991 and 1992. He also won the All Japan Sports Prototype Championship in 1990, with the controversial win at the Guia Touring Car race at the Macau Grand Prix in 1990 and Daytona 24 hour in 1992. Hasemi retired from driving in 2001 and now runs NDDP Racing, a Super GT team that currently competes in the GT500 class. Hasemi also owns Hasemi Sport, a former Super GT racing team that ran under the Hasemi Motorsport banner and Nissan aftermarket parts company.

Hasemi is the most recent Japanese driver to win his home Grand Prix, winning it in 1975, when it was a non-championship race.

== Racing record ==
=== Japanese Top Formula Championship results ===
(key)

Year	Entrant	1	2	3	4	5	6	7	8	9	10	11	DC	Points
1974	Kojima Engineering	SUZ	SUZ; 1	SUZ; 3	SUZ; 9								2nd	20
1975	Sakai Racing Team	**FUJ**; 1	SUZ; 1	FUJ	SUZ; Ret								3rd	45
1975	Kojima Engineering					SUZ; 5							3rd	45
1976	Kojima Engineering	FUJ; 5	SUZ	FUJ; 2	SUZ; 2	SUZ; 4							2nd	52
1977	Kojima Engineering	SUZ	SUZ	MIN	SUZ; 1	FUJ; 3							4th	46
1977	Private Hasemi						FUJ; 9	SUZ; 4	SUZ; 9				4th	46
1978	Tomy Racing Team	SUZ; 2	FUJ; 3	SUZ; 4	SUZ; Ret	SUZ; 3	**MIN**; 1	SUZ; 4					2nd	72 (82)
1979	Tomy Racing Team	**SUZ**; 3	**MIN**; 4	SUZ; 7	FUJ; 6	**SUZ**; 1	SUZ; 9	SUZ; Ret					5th	55 (58)
1980	Tomy Racing Team	SUZ; 2	**MIN**; 1	SUZ; 2	SUZ; 1	SUZ; 5	**SUZ**; 3						1st	71 (79)
1981	Tomy Racing Team	SUZ; 7	SUZ; Ret	SUZ; 7	SUZ; 4	SUZ; 7							9th	22
1984	Speed Star Wheel Racing Team	SUZ; 12	FUJ; 5	MIN; 5	SUZ; 15	SUZ; 3	FUJ; 12	SUZ; 5	SUZ; 8				6th	39
1985	Speed Star Wheel Racing Team	SUZ; 8	FUJ; Ret	MIN; 4	SUZ; 2	SUZ; 7	FUJ; 8	SUZ; 11	SUZ; 9				8th	37
1986	Speed Star Wheel Racing Team	SUZ; 7	FUJ; 7	MIN; 5	SUZ; 11	SUZ; 7	FUJ; 7	SUZ; 7	SUZ; 9				9th	28 (30)
1987	Speed Star Wheel Racing Team	SUZ; Ret	FUJ; 4	MIN; 6	SUZ; 12	SUZ; 12	SUG; 4	FUJ; 3	SUZ; Ret	SUZ; Ret			7th	38
1988	Speed Star Wheel Racing Team	SUZ; Ret	FUJ; Ret	MIN; 8	SUZ; 13	SUG; 8	FUJ; 7	SUZ; Ret	SUZ; 3				9th	4
1989	Speed Star Wheel Racing Team	SUZ; 6	FUJ; 4	MIN; 5	SUZ; 3	**SUG**; Ret	FUJ; 8	SUZ; 5	SUZ; 1				4th	21
1990	Speed Star Wheel Racing Team	SUZ; 4	FUJ; 6	MIN; Ret	SUZ; 6	SUG; 13	FUJ; 8	FUJ; Ret	SUZ; 11	FUJ; 12	SUZ; 8		13th	5
1991	Speed Star Wheel Racing Team	SUZ; 9	AUT; DNQ	FUJ; 14	MIN; DNQ	SUZ; Ret	SUG; Ret	FUJ; 19	SUZ; 15	FUJ; C	SUZ; 14	FUJ; 5	21st	2

=== Complete Formula One results ===
(key)

Year	Entrant	Chassis	Engine	1	2	3	4	5	6	7	8	9	10	11	12	13	14	15	16	WDC	Pts
1976	Kojima Engineering	Kojima KE007	Ford Cosworth DFV 3.0 V8	BRA	RSA	USW	ESP	BEL	MON	SWE	FRA	GBR	GER	AUT	NED	ITA	CAN	USA	JPN; 11	NC	0

=== Complete JTC/JTCC results ===
(key) (Races in bold indicate pole position) (Races in italics indicate fastest lap)

Year	Team	Car	Class	1	2	3	4	5	6	7	8	9	10	11	12	13	14	15	16	17	18	DC	Pts
1989	Hasemi Motorsport	Nissan Skyline GTS-R	JTC-1	NIS; 4	SEN; 2	TSU; 1	SUG; 1	SUZ; 1	FUJ; Ret													1st	161
1990	Hasemi Motorsport	Nissan Skyline GT-R	JTC-1	NIS; 2	SUG; 2	SUZ; 1	TSU; Ret	SEN; 2	FUJ; 2													3rd	160
1991	Hasemi Motorsport	Nissan Skyline GT-R	JTC-1	SUG; 2	SUZ; 1	TSU; 1	SEN; 2	AUT; 1	FUJ; 4													1st	200
1992	Hasemi Motorsport	Nissan Skyline GT-R	JTC-1	AID; 1	AUT; 7	SUG; 5	SUZ; 2	MIN; 1	TSU; 4	SEN; 3	FUJ; 2											1st	110
1993	Hasemi Motorsport	Nissan Skyline GT-R	JTC-1	MIN; 2	AUT; 4	SUG; 4	SUZ; 1	AID; 4	TSU; 5	TOK; 5	SEN; Ret	FUJ; 5										7th	89
1994	Nismo	Nissan Primera		AUT; 1; 4	AUT; 2; 2	SUG; 1; 4	SUG; 2; 2	TOK; 1; 9	TOK; 2; 8	SUZ; 1; 6	SUZ; 2; 8	MIN; 1; 5	MIN; 2 Ret	AID; 1; 5	AID; 2 Ret	TSU; 1 Ret	TSU; 2 DNS	SEN; 1	SEN; 2	FUJ; 1; 4	FUJ; 2; 5	6th	76
1995	Hasemi Motorsport	Nissan Primera		FUJ; 1; 14	FUJ; 2; 13	SUG; 1; 7	SUG; 2; 11	TOK; 1; 17	TOK; 2; 11	SUZ; 1; 13	SUZ; 2 Ret	MIN; 1; 13	MIN; 2; 15	AID; 1; 11	AID; 2; 8	SEN; 1; 15	SEN; 2; 13	FUJ; 1; 3	FUJ; 2; 8			16th	19
1996	HKS Opel Team Japan	Opel Vectra		FUJ; 1; 8	FUJ; 2; 12	SUG; 1 Ret	SUG; 2; 8	SUZ; 1; 10	SUZ; 2; 9	MIN; 1; 12	MIN; 2; 15	SEN; 1 Ret	SEN; 2; 8	TOK; 1; 8	TOK; 2; 10	FUJ; 1; 8	FUJ; 2; 6					14th	24

=== Complete JGTC results ===
(key) (Races in bold indicate pole position) (Races in italics indicate fastest lap)

Year	Team	Car	Class	1	2	3	4	5	6	7	DC	Pts
1994	Hasemi Motorsport	Nissan Skyline GT-R	GT500	FUJ; 6	**SEN**; 1	FUJ; 4	SUG; 3	MIN; 5			2nd	56
1995	Hasemi Motorsport	Nissan Skyline GT-R	GT500	**SUZ**; 4	FUJ; 2	SEN; 14	FUJ; 1	SUG; 4	**MIN**; 6		2nd	61
1996	Hasemi Motorsport	Nissan Skyline GT-R	GT500	SUZ; 3	FUJ; 6	SEN; 2	FUJ; 14	SUG; 6	MIN; 5		5th	47
1997	Hasemi Motorsport	Nissan Skyline GT-R	GT500	SUZ; 4	FUJ; 2	SEN; 9	FUJ; 6	MIN; 7	SUG; Ret		7th	37
1998	Hasemi Motorsport	Nissan Skyline GT-R	GT500	SUZ; 5	FUJ; C	SEN; Ret	FUJ; 2	MOT; 8	MIN; 8	SUG; 5	5th	37
1999	Hasemi Motorsport	Nissan Skyline GT-R	GT500	SUZ; 6	FUJ; 7	SUG; 7	MIN; 4	FUJ; 11	TAI; 12	MOT; 8	17th	27
2000	Hasemi Motorsport	Nissan Skyline GT-R	GT500	MOT; 5	FUJ; 9	SUG; Ret	FUJ; 11	TAI; 15	MIN; 11	SUZ; 8	16th	13

=== Complete Bathurst 1000 results ===
Year	Team	Co-Drivers	Car	Class	Laps	Pos.	Class Pos.
1981	(Australia) Nissan Motor Co.	(Japan) Kazuyoshi Hoshino	Nissan Bluebird Turbo	4 Cylinder	66	DNF	DNF
1982	(Australia) Nissan Motor Co.	(Japan) Kazuyoshi Hoshino	Nissan Bluebird Turbo	B	153	8th	**1st**

=== 24 Hours of Le Mans results ===
Year	Team	Co-Drivers	Car	Class	Laps	Pos.	Class Pos.
1986	(Japan) Nismo	(United Kingdom) James Weaver (Japan) Takao Wada	Nissan R85V	C1	285	16th	10th
1987	(Japan) Nismo	(Japan) Takao Wada (Japan) Aguri Suzuki	Nissan R87E	C1	117	DNF	DNF
1989	(Japan) Nismo	(Japan) Kazuyoshi Hoshino (Japan) Toshio Suzuki	Nissan R89C	C1	167	DNF	DNF
1990	(Japan) Nismo	(Japan) Kazuyoshi Hoshino (Japan) Toshio Suzuki	Nissan R90CP	C1	348	5th	5th
1996	(Japan) Nismo	(Japan) Kazuyoshi Hoshino (Japan) Toshio Suzuki	Nissan Nismo GT-R LM	GT1	307	15th	10th

== Notes ==
It was initially announced that Hasemi set the fastest lap at the 1976 Japanese Grand Prix, but it was a measurement mistake, and, several days later, the circuit issued a press release to correct the fastest lap holder of the race to Jacques Laffite. This press release was promptly made known in Japan, and the Japan Automobile Federation (JAF) and Japanese media corrected the record. But this correction was not made well known outside Japan, thus, Hasemi remains credited with a fastest lap in many record books.

Sporting positions
Preceded by Keiji Matsumoto	Japanese Formula Two; Champion; 1980	Succeeded by Satoru Nakajima
Preceded by Hisashi Yokoshima	Japanese Touring Car Championship; Champion; 1989	Succeeded by Kazuyoshi Hoshino
Preceded by Tim Harvey	Guia Race winner 1990	Succeeded by Emanuele Pirro
Preceded by Kazuyoshi Hoshino	Japanese Touring Car Championship; Champion; 1991–1992	Succeeded by Masahiko Kageyama
