= Chrysler SERV =

Rocket design submitted for the Space Shuttle contest

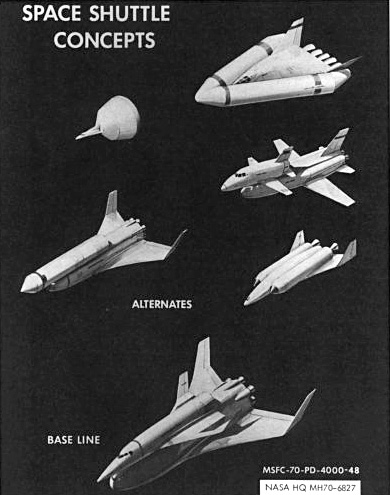
In the top left is SERV with MURP. In comparison to the DC-3 design, with the straight wings to the right of SERV, SERV would be just over 100 feet long, while DC-3 was just under 300.

SERV, short for Single-stage Earth-orbital Reusable Vehicle, was a proposed space launch system designed by Chrysler's Space Division for the Space Shuttle project. SERV was radically different from the two-stage spaceplanes that almost every other competitor entered into the Shuttle development process and was never given serious consideration for the shuttle program.

SERV was to be a single-stage to orbit spacecraft that would take off from the existing Saturn V complexes and land vertically at Kennedy for re-use. SERV looked like a greatly expanded Apollo capsule, with an empty central core able to carry 125,000 lb (57,000 kg) of cargo. SERV could be launched uncrewed for cargo missions, ejecting a cargo capsule and returning to Earth. For crewed missions, a separate spaceplane, MURP (Manned Upper-stage Reusable Payload), could be carried atop the vehicle.

The name "SERV" was also used by an entirely unrelated NASA project, the "Space Emergency Re-entry Vehicle".

== History ==
=== Background ===
In 1966 the US Air Force started a study effort that explored a variety of crewed spacecraft and associated launchers. As the proposals were studied, they broke them down into one of three classes, based on the level of reusability. On the simpler end of the development scale were the "Class I" vehicles that placed a spaceplane on top of an existing or modified ICBM-based launcher. "Class II" vehicles added partial reusability for some of the launcher components, while the "Class III" vehicles were fully reusable. The USAF had already started work on a Class I design in their X-20 Dyna Soar program, which had been cancelled in December 1963, but were interested in the Lockheed Star Clipper Class II design as a possible future development. Nothing ever came of the study effort, as the USAF wound down their interest in crewed space programs.

At the time, NASA was in the midst of winding down the Project Apollo build-out, as the vehicles progressed to flight. Looking into the future, a number of NASA offices started programs to explore crewed missions in the 1970s and beyond. Among the many proposals, a permanently crewed space station was a favorite. These plans generally assumed the use of the existing Saturn rockets to launch the stations, and even the crews, but the Saturn systems were not set up for the sort of constant supply and crew turnaround being envisioned. The idea of a simple and inexpensive crewed launcher, a "ferry and logistics vehicle", developed out of the space station studies almost as an afterthought, the first mention of it being in the fiscal year 1967 budgets.

Design of a low cost, reusable Space Transportation System (STS) started in earnest in December 1967, when George Mueller organized a one-day brainstorming session on the topic. He jump-started the discussion by inviting the USAF to attend, even keeping the original USAF acronym for the project, "ILRV". Like the original USAF studies, a small vehicle was envisioned, carrying replacement crews and basic supplies, with an emphasis on low cost of operations and fast turnarounds. Unlike the USAF, however, NASA's Space Task Force quickly decided to move directly to the Class III designs.

=== Phase A ===
NASA envisioned a four-phase program of development for the STS. "Phase A" was a series of initial studies to select an overall technology path, and development contracts for proposals were released in 1968 with the proposals expected back in the fall of 1969. A number of designs were presented from a variety of industry partners. Almost universally, the designs were small, fully reusable, and based around delta wing or lifting body spaceplanes.

Chrysler Aerospace won contract NAS8-26341 for their entry into the Phase A series, forming a team under Charles Tharratt. Their 1969 report, NASA-CR-148948, outlined the SERV design, preliminary performance measures, and basic mission profiles. This report described a 23 foot (7.0 m) wide cargo bay (Note: Similar in diameter to the Saturn IV stage, allowing easy carriage of cargo on either platform.) Tharratt was convinced that SERV offered better flexibility than any of the winged platforms, allowing it to launch both crewed and uncrewed missions, and being much smaller overall.

With most of the NASA centers backing one of the winged vehicles, and being dramatically different from any of them, SERV found no supporters within the bureaucracy and was never seriously considered for STS. Additionally, the astronaut corps was adamant that any future NASA spacecraft would have to be crewed, (so the potentially uncrewed SERV won no converts there either), and the concept had high technological risk as an SSTO due to weight growth sensitivity.

An extension contract was offered anyway, producing the final NASA-CR-150241 report on the SERV design that was turned in on 1 July 1971. This differed mostly in minor details, the major change being the reduction of the cargo bay width from 23 feet to 15 foot (4.6 m) in keeping with the rest of the Shuttle proposals.

== Description ==
=== Vehicle design ===
SERV consisted of a large conical body with a rounded base that Chrysler referred to as a "modified Apollo design". The resemblance is due to the fact that both vehicles used blunt body re-entry profiles, which lessen heating load during re-entry by creating a very large shock wave in front of a rounded surface. Tilting the vehicle in relation to the direction of motion changes the pattern of the shock waves, producing lift that can be used to maneuver the spacecraft - in the case of SERV, up to about 100 NM on either side of its ballistic path. To aid lift generation, SERV was "stepped", with the lower portion of the cone angled in at about 30 degrees, and the upper portion closer to 45 degrees. SERV was 96 feet (29 m) across at the widest point, and 83 feet (25 m) tall. Gross lift off weight was just over 6,000,000 lb (2,700,000 kg), about the same as the Saturn V's 6,200,000 lb (2,800,000 kg) but more than the Shuttle's 4,500,000 lb (2,000,000 kg).

The majority of the SERV airframe consisted of steel composite honeycomb. The base was covered with screw-on ablative heat shield panels, which allowed for easy replacement between missions. The upper portions of the airframe, which received dramatically lower heating loads, were covered with metal shingles covering a quartz insulation below. Four landing legs extended from the bottom, their "foot" forming their portion of heat shield surface when retracted.

A twelve module LH2/LOX aerospike engine was arranged around the rim of the base, covered by movable metal shields. During the ascent the shields would move out from the body to adjust for decreasing air pressure, forming a large altitude compensating nozzle. The module was fed from a set of four cross-linked turbopumps that in normal operations would run at 75% of their design capacity, if one turbopump failed then throttling up the remaining 3 to 100% would allow full power to be maintained. The engine as a whole would provide 7,454,000 lbf (25.8 MN) of thrust, about the same as the S-IC, the first stage of the Saturn V.

Also arranged around the base were forty 20,000 lbf (89 kN) jet engines, which were fired just prior to touchdown in order to slow the descent. Movable doors above the engines opened for feed air. Two RL10's provided de-orbit thrust, so the main engine did not have to be restarted in space. Even on-orbit maneuvering, which was not extensive for the SERV (see below), was provided by small LOX/LH2 engines instead of thrusters using different fuels.

A series of conical tanks around the outside rim of the craft, just above the engines, stored the LOX. LH2 was stored in much larger tanks closer to the center of the craft. Much smaller spherical tanks, located in the gaps below the rounded end of the LOX tanks, held the JP-4 used to feed the jet engines. Orbital maneuvering and de-orbit engines were clustered around the top of the spacecraft, fed by their own tanks interspersed between the LH2. This arrangement of tanks left a large open space in the middle of the craft, 15 by 60 feet (18 m), which served as the cargo hold. (Note: Some sources based on the original 1969 version of the SERV design state the cargo hold is 23 feet wide, but the final vehicle selection reduced this to 15 by 60 feet in keeping with the other shuttle designs.)

=== Operational modes ===
Two basic spacecraft configurations and mission profiles were envisioned. "Mode A" missions flew SERV to a high-altitude parking orbit at 260 nmi (480 km) inclined at 55 degrees, just below the space station's orbit at 270 nmi (500 km). "Mode B" missions flew to a 110 nmi (200 km) low Earth orbit (LEO) inclined at 28.5 degrees, a due-east launch from the Kennedy Space Center. In either case the SERV was paired with a long cargo container in its bay, and optionally combined with a crewed spacecraft on top.

The original proposals used a lifting body spaceplane known as MURP to support crewed missions. The MURP was based on the HL-10 design already under study by North American Rockwell as part of their STS efforts. MURP was fitted on top of a cargo container and fairing, which was 114 feet (35 m) long overall. In the second version of the study, Chrysler also added an option that replaced MURP with a "personnel module", based on the Apollo CSM, which was 74 feet (23 m) long when combined with the same cargo container. The original, "SERV-MURP", was 137 ft (42 m) when combined with SERV, while the new configuration, "SERV-PM", was 101 ft (31 m) tall. Both systems included an all-aspect abort of the crewed portion throughout the entire ascent.

After considering all four combinations of mode and module, two basic mission profiles were selected as the most efficient. With SERV-PM the high Earth orbit would be used and the PM would maneuver only a short distance to reach the station. With SERV-MURP, the low Earth orbit would be used and the MURP would maneuver the rest of the way on its own. In either case, the SERV could return to Earth immediately and let the PM or MURP land on their own, or more commonly, wait in the parking orbit for a cargo module from an earlier mission to rendezvous with it for return to Earth. Weight and balance considerations limited the return payload.

Both configurations delivered 25,000 lb (11,000 kg) of cargo to the space station, although in the PM configuration the overall thrown weights were much lower. If the PM configuration was used with a fairing instead of the capsule, SERV could deliver 112,000 lb (51,000 kg) to LEO, or as much as 125,000 lb (57,000 kg) with an "Extended Nosecone". The Extended Nosecone was a long spike with a high fineness ratio that lowered atmospheric drag by creating shock waves that cleared the vehicle body during ascent.

In addition, Chrysler also outlined ways to support 33 ft (10 m) wide loads on the front of SERV. This was the diameter of the S-IC and S-II, the lower stages of the Saturn V. NASA had proposed a wide variety of payloads for the Apollo Applications Program that were based on this diameter that were intended to be launched on the Saturn INT-21. Chrysler demonstrated that they could also be launched on SERV, if weight considerations taken into account. However, these plans were based on the earlier SERV designs with the larger 23 ft (7.0 m) cargo bay. When NASA's loads were adapted to fit to the smaller 15 ft (4.6 m) bay common to all the STS proposals, this option was dropped.

SERV was not expected to remain on orbit for extended periods of time, with the longest missions outlined in the report at just under 48 hours. Typically it would return after a small number of orbits brought its ground track close enough to Kennedy, and abort-once-around missions were contemplated. The vehicle was designed to return to a location within four miles (6 km) of the touchdown point using re-entry maneuvering, the rest would be made up during the jet-powered descent.

=== Construction and operations ===
NASA had partnered with Chrysler to build the NASA-designed Saturn IB, at the Michoud Assembly Facility outside New Orleans. Chrysler proposed building SERVs at Michoud as well, delivering them to KSC on the Bay-class ships used to deliver Boeing's S-IC from the same factory. Since the SERV was wider than the ships, it had to be carried slightly tilted in order to reduce its overall width. Pontoons were then added to the side of the ships to protect the spacecraft from spray.

SERVs would be fitted out in the Vehicle Assembly Building (VAB) High Bay, mated with the PM or MURP which were prepared in the Low Bay, and then transported to the LC39 pads on the existing crawler-transporters. The LC39 pads required only minor modifications for SERV use, similar to those needed to launch the Saturn IB. Chrysler proposed building several SERV landing pads between LC39 and the VAB, and a landing strip for the MURP near the existing Space Shuttle landing strip. The SERVs would be returned to the VAB on an enormous flatbed truck. The only other new infrastructure was a set of test stands at the Mississippi Test Operations engine testing complex, near Michoud.

=== Development and construction costs ===
Re-using much of the existing infrastructure lowered overall program costs; total costs were estimated as $3.565 billion, with each SERV costing $350 million in FY1971 dollars, and being rated for 100 flights over a 10-year service life. This was far less expensive than the two-stage flyback proposals entered by most companies, which had peak development costs on the order of $10 billion.

== Similar designs ==
SERV was similar to the later McDonnell Douglas DC-X design. The primary difference between the two was that the DC-X was built to a military mission and required much greater re-entry maneuvering capability. Because of this, the airframe was long and skinny, and the spacecraft re-entered nose-first. Tilting this shape relative to the path of motion generates considerably more lift than the blunt base of SERV, but also subjects the airframe to much higher heating loads.

More recently, the original SERV layout was used in the Blue Origin Goddard spacecraft. Like the SERV, Goddard did not need the extended crossrange capabilities of a military launcher, and returned to the simpler blunt-base re-entry profile. The similar Kankoh-maru design study also used the same blunt-body VTOL profile.

== See also ==
- Douglas SASSTO
- List of space launch system designs
