= DDDC =

DDDC may refer to:

- double-device data correction, in computer memory
- Derbyshire Dales District Council, Derbyshire Dales, Derbyshire, East Midlands, Midlands, England, UK
- Da Daghay Development Corporation, Ta’an Kwäch’än Council, Whitehorse, Yukon, Canada; see Fred Koe

== See also ==
- DCCC (disambiguation)
- 3DC (disambiguation)
- DC (disambiguation)
