= DCC =

DCC may refer to:

== Biology ==
- Netrin receptor DCC, human receptor protein, and the gene encoding it
- Dosage compensation complex

== Business ==
- Day Chocolate Company
- DCC plc, an Irish holding company
- Doppelmayr Cable Car, cable car company
- Digital Cybercherries Ltd., a British game development studio
- Dynamic currency conversion

== Chemistry ==
- Dynamic combinatorial chemistry, a method to the generation of new molecules formed by the reversible reaction of relatively simple components under thermodynamic control
- N,N'-Dicyclohexylcarbodiimide, a peptide coupling chemical reagent used in organic synthesis

== Computing and electronics ==
- Data communication channel, a concept in synchronous optical networking
- Digital Command Control, a system for controlling model trains
- Digital Compact Cassette, Philips system with digital audio on compact cassette
- Digital content creation, a category of tools used for creation of electronic media
- Direct cable connection, for networking two computers together
- Direct Client-to-Client, a protocol for file transfer and direct chat on Internet Relay Chat (IRC)
- Directed channel change, part of the Program and System Information Protocol
- Distributed Checksum Clearinghouse, a hash-sharing system for detecting e-mail spam

== Education ==
- Dallas Christian College, a four-year undergraduate college located in Farmers Branch, Texas
- Danville Community College, a junior college in Danville, Virginia
- Darrin Communications Center, a building in Rensselaer Polytechnic Institute
- Delgado Community College, a junior college in New Orleans, Louisiana
- Dhaka City College, a private college of Bangladesh
- Discovery Canyon Campus, a public PK–12 school in Colorado Springs, Colorado
- Dutchess Community College, a junior college in Poughkeepsie, New York

== Government ==
- Arkansas Department of Community Correction
- Dallas City Council - see Law and government of Dallas
- Devon County Council in the United Kingdom
- Dhaka City Corporation in Bangladesh
- Derbyshire County Council in the United Kingdom
- Dorset County Council in the United Kingdom
- Dublin City Council in Ireland
- Dunedin City Council in New Zealand
- Department of Climate Change, a now defunct government department in Australia

== Mathematics ==
- Descending Chain Condition, in the field of order theory in mathematics

== Organizations ==
- DCC Alliance, a now-defunct Debian-based industry consortium
- Dennistoun Community Council, a community council in Glasgow, Scotland
- Digital Copyright Canada, a group advocating against excessive intellectual property laws in Canada
- Downcounty Consortium, A consortium of five high schools in the Montgomery County, Maryland, public school system

== Politics ==
- District Coordination Committee, a district level authority found in Nepal

== Other uses ==
- Dallas Convention Center
- Dallas Country Club
- Dallas Cowboys Cheerleaders
- Daejeon Convention Center, a facility in South Korea
- Dead Club City, a studio album by English alternative rock band Nothing but Thieves
- Death Crew Council, a wrestling stable in TNA
- Derriaghy Cricket Club
- Defence Construction Canada
- Denver Comic Con, a three-day multigenre convention held annually in Denver, Colorado
- Deputy chief constable, a British police rank
- Digital Curation Centre, a United Kingdom Centre of Leadership for digital longevity
- Dungeon Crawl Classics, a fantasy role playing game
- Dungeon Crawler Carl, a science fantasy LitRPG book series by Matt Dinniman
- The Roman number for 700
- Document kind classification code, according to IEC 61355

== See also ==
- DC (disambiguation)
- DCCC (disambiguation)
