= 3DC =

3DC may refer to:

- 3Dc, a lossy data compression algorithm for normal maps invented by ATI
- .3dc, a file extension for Cadwork
- 3DC, a 1987 videogame from Hit-Pak for the ZX Spectrum; see List of ZX Spectrum games
- 3D Camera Experiment (3DC) in the ESA Scientific Research on the International Space Station
- Direct debit dividend contributions

== See also ==
- DDDC
- DC3 (disambiguation)
- DC (disambiguation)
