= Lockheed Star Clipper =

1966 proposed Earth-to-orbit spaceplane

The Lockheed Star Clipper was a proposed Earth-to-orbit spaceplane based on a large lifting body spacecraft and a wrap-around drop tank. Originally proposed during a United States Air Force program in 1966, the basic Star Clipper concept lived on during the early years of the NASA Space Shuttle program, and as that project evolved, in a variety of new versions like the LS-200.

Although the Star Clipper design did not progress far in the Space Transportation System (STS) program, it had an enormous effect on the emerging Space Shuttle design. The detailed study of the cost advantages of the drop tank design demonstrated a dramatic reduction in development risk, and as a result, development costs. When funding for STS development was cut, the drop tank was taken up as a way to meet the developmental budgets, leading to the semi-reusable Space Shuttle design.

== History ==
=== Max Hunter ===
Maxwell Hunter was working at Douglas Aircraft where he formalized the calculation of aircraft operation economics. His methodologies were first published in 1940, and were later applied to the Douglas DC-6 and DC-7. The methodologies were later adopted as a standard by the Air Transport Association.

He later joined the Thor missile project as the chief design engineer, and this introduced him to the world of space launchers. With new upper stages, Thor became the Delta, one of the most-used launchers in the 1960s. In spite of Thor's success, Hunter was dissatisfied with the state of the launcher market and later wrote that "by the end of 1963 the state of recoverable rockets was terrible." He was convinced that as long as launchers were thrown away, access to space would never be affordable.

Several companies had already completed early feasibility studies of fully reusable spacecraft, like the Martin Marietta Astrorocket and Douglas Astro. The designs used two flyback stages, one of which flew back to the launch point, while the other flew into orbit and landed after its mission. Hunter thought that any such design was tantamount to making two aircraft to do the job of one, and it was only the upper stage that was of any real use. By March 1964 he had developed a new concept, the stage-and-a-half configuration.

In a two-stage rocket, one rocket fires to lift a second high into the air, and then falls off. The second then fires and travels into orbit. The advantage to this design is that the weight of the rocket decreases as it climbs, reducing the amount of mass that has to be carried all the way into orbit. The downside to this approach is that it needs two complete rockets, both expensive, and a time-consuming operation.

In his stage-and-a-half configuration, Hunter had only one rocket. However, no rocket of the era had the performance needed to reach orbit on its own with a useful payload, so some sort of staging was needed. Hunter's solution was to place just the fuel tanks in the "stage", which would be ejected during the ascent. This gave the vehicle the advantages of staging, but threw away only the tankage, returning all of the expensive parts for re-use. After landing the vehicle would be refit, mated with another tank, and be ready for another mission.

Hunter moved to Lockheed in the fall of 1965. On his first day he was asked if there was anything Lockheed should be looking at, and he immediately suggested development of his stage-and-a-half design. His suggestions caught the ear of Eugene Root, president of Lockheed Missiles and Space, who gave him the go-ahead to study what became known as the Star Clipper.

=== Space Transportation System ===
As the Apollo build-out started to wind down in 1966, NASA started looking at their future through and after the 1970s. In the short term a number of different uses of surplus Saturn hardware were grouped together into the Apollo Applications Program office, rounding out missions into the mid-1970s. Beyond that, NASA evolved an aggressive program that included a permanently crewed space station, a small lunar base, and eventually a crewed mission to Mars. Almost as an afterthought, the idea of a "logistics vehicle" developed in order to lower the cost of space station operations. The vehicle was dedicated to changing crews on the space station on a weekly basis, or as Walter Dornberger put it, "an economical space plane capable of putting a fresh egg, every morning, on the table of every crew member of a space station circling the globe."

In 1967, George Mueller organized a one-day meeting to discuss the logistics vehicle concept. A year earlier the Air Force and NASA had collaborated on a study of existing technologies in the "Integrated Launch and Re-entry Vehicle" project, or ILRV. ILRV had grouped the various industry submissions into three groups, "Class I" which placed a reusable spaceplane on top of an expendable booster, "Class II" were fully reusable rocket-based designs, and "Class III" used advanced air-breathing engines. Mueller dusted off the ILRV work and invited the same industry partners to present, deciding to concentrate only on the Class II designs.

Lockheed submitted Star Clipper, and McDonnell introduced another stage-and-a-half design, Tip Tank. General Dynamics addressed Hunters concerns about building two aircraft for one mission in their Triamese, which used several identical spacecraft grouped together with only one travelling onto orbit. Chrysler had the oddest submission, SERV, which was so different that it was never considered seriously. The vast majority of the entries, however, were two-stage spaceplanes. As it became clear that the program was moving forward, NASA's own teams entered the fray, adding their own designs to the mix.

NASA supported the "classic" flyback design until 1971, when the maximum development budget was cut in half by the Office of Management and Budget, from about $10 to $5 billion. This was not enough to develop a fully reusable design, and the entire concept went back to the drawing board. It was then that Hunter's arguments for the Star Clipper made their lasting mark; the development costs for a stage-and-a-half design were much lower because there was only one spacecraft being developed. Ironically it was not Lockheed's spacecraft that would be eventually built, but North American Aviation's version of the concept.

== Description ==
Star Clipper was based around a large lifting body re-entry vehicle known as the LSC-8MX, which was based on the FDL-5LD and FDL-8H designs developed at the Air Force's Flight Dynamics Laboratory. At hypersonic speeds, during re-entry, the craft had a lift-to-drag ratio of 1.8 to 1, giving it ample maneuvering capability. In the lower atmosphere this was far too low to allow safe landings in the case of a go-around, so the Star Clipper featured small wings that rotated out of the side of the spacecraft at subsonic speeds, improving the L/D to 8.1:1. To aid landings, two jet engines extended from the top of the fuselage, giving it the ability to abort landings. It was 186 ft (57 m) long and had a 106 ft (32 m) wide at the tips of its upturned wingtips.

The Clipper was powered by three 1.5-million-pound-force (6,700 kN) thrust M-1 engines. Public versions of the design showed the engines being equipped with expanding nozzles, a way to improve the performance of the rocket engines by better matching them to the local atmospheric pressure as it climbs. However it was later revealed that Lockheed was actually proposing using a linear aerospike engine for the production design. LOX and some of the LH2 fuel was carried in tanks in the fuselage, but most of the LH2 was carried in a large external tank. The tank was shaped like an upside-down V, matching the shape of the sharply swept leading-edge of the lifting body. LH2 would be drawn from this tank first, and when it was empty it would detach and be released during the ascent. It was mounted and shaped such that the airflow around the craft would pull the tank up and over the spacecraft.

As the Space Transportation System (STS) proposals moved from the initial Phase A designs into the Phase B detailed development, NASA set the cargo requirements smaller than the original Star Clipper's capabilities. A new version of the same design, the LS-200, emerged. Although the LS-200 was very similar to the earlier version, it was smaller overall, reduced the tank diameter from 285 to 156 inches (7,200 to 4,000 mm), the maximum allowed for road transport, and reduced payload from 50,000 to 25,000 lb (23,000 to 11,000 kg). The M-1 engines were replaced with the Space Shuttle Main Engine, reducing total thrust from 5,000,000 to 915,085 lbf (22,241.11 to 4,070.50 kN), while overall gross lift off weight fell from 3,500,000 to 662,286 lb (1,587,573 to 300,408 kg).

== See also ==
- List of space launch system designs
