= Space Shuttle design process =

Development program of the NASA Space Shuttle

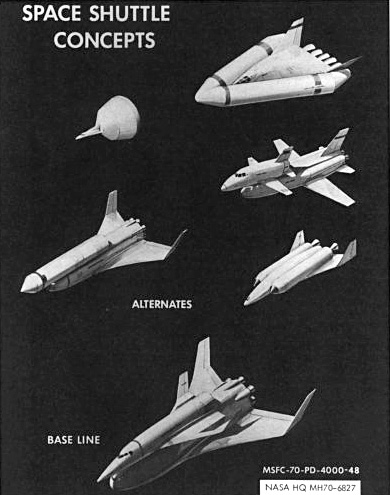
Early U.S. space shuttle concepts

Before the Apollo 11 Moon landing in 1969, NASA began studies of Space Shuttle designs as early as October 1968. The early studies were denoted "Phase A", and in June 1970, "Phase B", which were more detailed and specific. The primary intended use of the Phase A Space Shuttle was supporting the future space station, ferrying a minimum crew of four and about 20,000 pounds (9,100 kg) of cargo, and being able to be rapidly turned around for future flights, with larger payloads like space station modules being lifted by the Saturn V.

Two designs emerged as front-runners. One was designed by engineers at the Manned Spaceflight Center, and championed especially by George Mueller. This was a two-stage system with delta-winged spacecraft, and generally complex. An attempt to re-simplify was made in the form of the DC-3, designed by Maxime Faget, who had designed the Mercury capsule among other vehicles. Numerous offerings from a variety of commercial companies were also considered but generally fell by the wayside as each NASA lab pushed for its own version.

All of this was taking place in the midst of other NASA teams proposing a wide variety of post-Apollo missions, a number of which would cost as much as Apollo or more. As each of these projects fought for funding, the NASA budget was at the same time being severely constrained. Three were eventually presented to United States Vice President Spiro Agnew in 1969. The shuttle project rose to the top, largely due to tireless campaigning by its supporters. By 1970 the shuttle had been selected as the one major project for the short-term post-Apollo time frame.

When funding for the program came into question, there were concerns that the project might be canceled. This became especially pressing as it became clear that the Saturn V would no longer be produced, which meant that the payload to orbit needed to be increased in both mass - all the way to 60,600 pounds (27,500 kg) - and size to supplement its heavy-lift capabilities, necessary for planned interplanetary probes and space station modules, which meant a bigger and costlier vehicle was needed during Phase B. Therefore, NASA tried to interest the US Air Force and a variety of other customers in using the shuttle for their missions as well. To lower the development costs of the proposed designs, boosters were added, a throw-away fuel tank was adopted, and many other changes were made that greatly lowered the reusability and greatly added to the vehicle and operational costs.

== Decision-making process ==
In 1969, United States Vice President Spiro Agnew chaired the National Aeronautics and Space Council, which discussed post-Apollo options for human space activities. The recommendations of the Council would heavily influence the decisions of the administration. The Council considered four major options:

- A human mission to Mars
- Follow-on lunar program
- A low Earth orbital infrastructure program
- Discontinuing human space activities

Based on the advice of the Space Council, President Nixon made the decision to pursue the low Earth orbital infrastructure option. This program mainly consisted of the construction of a space station, along with the development of a Space Shuttle. Funding restrictions precluded pursuing the development of both programs simultaneously, however. NASA chose to develop the Space Shuttle program first, and then planned to use the shuttle in order to construct and service a space station.

== Shuttle design debate ==
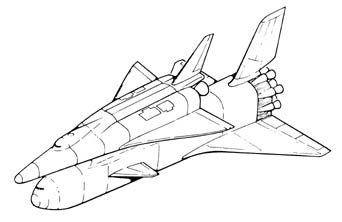
Original North American Rockwell Shuttle delta wing design, 1969: fully reusable, with a flyback crewed booster

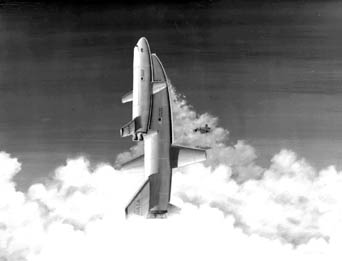
Maxime Faget's DC-3 concept employed conventional straight wings.

During the early shuttle studies, there was a debate over the optimal shuttle design that best-balanced capability, development cost, and operational cost. Initially, a fully reusable design was preferred. This involved a very large winged crewed booster which would carry a smaller winged crewed orbiter. The booster vehicle would lift the orbiter to a certain altitude and speed, then separate. The booster would return and land horizontally, while the orbiter continued into low Earth orbit. After completing its mission, the winged orbiter would re-enter and land horizontally on a runway. The idea was that full reusability would promote lower operating costs.

However, further studies showed a huge booster was needed to lift an orbiter with the desired payload capability. In space and aviation systems, the cost is closely related to mass, so this meant the overall vehicle cost would be very high. Both booster and orbiter would have rocket engines plus jet engines for use within the atmosphere, plus separate fuel and control systems for each propulsion mode. In addition, there were concurrent discussions about how much funding would be available to develop the program.

Another competing approach was maintaining the Saturn V production line and using its large payload capacity to launch a space station in a few payloads rather than many smaller shuttle payloads. A related concept was servicing the space station using the Air Force Titan III-M to launch a larger Gemini capsule, called "Big Gemini", or a smaller "glider" version of the shuttle with no main engines and a 15 ft × 30 ft (4.6 m × 9.1 m) payload bay.

The shuttle supporters answered that given enough launches, a reusable system would have lower overall costs than disposable rockets. If dividing total program costs over a given number of launches, a high shuttle launch rate would result in lower pre-launch costs. This in turn would make the shuttle cost-competitive with or superior to expendable launchers. Some theoretical studies mentioned 55 shuttle launches per year; however, the final design chosen did not support that launch rate. In particular, the maximum external tank production rate was limited to 24 tanks per year at NASA's Michoud Assembly Facility.

The combined space station and Air Force payload requirements were not sufficient to reach desired shuttle launch rates. Therefore, the plan was for all future U.S. space launches—space stations, Air Force, commercial satellites, and scientific research—to use only the Space Shuttle. Most other expendable boosters would be phased out.

The reusable booster was eventually abandoned due to several factors: high price (combined with limited funding), technical complexity, and development risk. Instead, a partially (not fully) reusable design was selected, where an external propellant tank was discarded for each launch, and the booster rockets and shuttle orbiter were refurbished for reuse.

Initially, the orbiter was to carry its own liquid propellant. However, studies showed carrying the propellant in an external tank allowed a larger payload bay in an otherwise much smaller craft. It also meant throwing away the tank after each launch, but this was a relatively small portion of operating costs.

Earlier designs assumed the winged orbiter would also have jet engines to assist maneuvering in the atmosphere after re-entering. However NASA ultimately chose a gliding orbiter, based partially on experience from previous rocket-then-glide vehicles such as the X-15 and lifting bodies. Omitting the jet engines and their fuel would reduce complexity and increase payload.

Another decision was the size of the crew. Some said that the shuttle should not carry more than four, the most that could use ejection seats. A commander, pilot, mission specialist, and payload specialist were sufficient for any mission. NASA expected to carry more space flight participants as payload specialists, so designed the vehicle to carry more.

The last remaining debate was over the nature of the boosters. NASA examined four solutions to this problem: development of the existing Saturn lower stage, simple pressure-fed liquid-fuel engines of a new design, a large single solid rocket, or two (or more) smaller ones. Engineers at NASA's Marshall Space Flight Center (where the Saturn V development was managed) were particularly concerned about solid rocket reliability for crewed missions.

== Air Force involvement ==
During the mid-1960s the United States Air Force had both of its major piloted space projects, X-20 Dyna-Soar and Manned Orbiting Laboratory, canceled. This demonstrated its need to cooperate with NASA to place military astronauts and payloads in orbit. The Air Force launched more than 200 satellite reconnaissance missions between 1959 and 1970, and the military's large volume of payloads would be valuable in making the shuttle more economical. In turn, by serving Air Force needs, the Shuttle became a truly national system, carrying all military as well as civilian payloads.

NASA sought Air Force support for the shuttle. After the Six-Day War and the Soviet invasion of Czechoslovakia exposed limitations in the United States satellite reconnaissance network, Air Force involvement emphasized the ability to launch spy satellites southward into polar orbit from Vandenberg AFB. This required higher energies than for lower inclination orbits. However, to be able to return to Earth after one orbit, despite the Earth rotating 1,000 miles beneath the orbital track, required a larger delta wing size than the earlier simple "DC-3" shuttle. In addition, the straight-wing configuration favored by Max Faget would've required the vehicle to fly in a stall for most of the reentry and had issues during launch aborts, a situation disliked by NASA. It is a common misconception that the delta wing was solely by demand of the USAF, however that is merely a myth.

Despite the potential benefits for the Air Force, the military was satisfied with its expendable boosters, and had less need for the shuttle than NASA. Because the space agency needed outside support, the Defense Department (DoD) and the National Reconnaissance Office (NRO) gained primary control over the design process. For example, NASA planned a 40-by-15-foot (12.2 by 4.6 m) cargo bay, but NRO specified a 60-by-15-foot (18.3 by 4.6 m) bay because it expected future intelligence satellites to become larger. When Faget again proposed a 12 ft (3.7 m) wide payload bay, the military almost immediately insisted on retaining the 15 ft (4.6 m) width. The Air Force also gained the equivalent of the use of one of the shuttles for free despite not paying for the shuttle's development or construction. In exchange for the NASA concessions, the Air Force testified to the Senate Space Committee on the shuttle's behalf in March 1971.

As another incentive for the military to use the shuttle, Congress reportedly told DoD that it would not pay for any satellites not designed to fit into the shuttle cargo bay. Although NRO did not redesign existing satellites for the shuttle, the vehicle retained the ability to retrieve large cargos such as the KH-9 HEXAGON from orbit for refurbishment, and the agency studied resupplying the satellite in space.

Potential military use of the shuttle—including the possibility of using it to verify Soviet compliance with the SALT II treaty—probably caused President Jimmy Carter to not cancel the shuttle in 1979 and 1980, when the program was years behind schedule and hundreds of millions of dollars over budget. The Air Force planned on having its own fleet of shuttles and re-built a separate launch facility originally derived from the canceled Manned Orbiting Laboratory program at Vandenberg called Space Launch Complex Six (SLC-6). However, for various reasons, due in large part to the loss of Space Shuttle Challenger on January 28, 1986, work on SLC-6 was eventually discontinued and no shuttle launches from that location ever took place. SLC-6 was eventually used for launching the Lockheed Martin-built Athena expendable launch vehicles, which included the successful IKONOS commercial Earth observation satellite in September 1999 before being reconfigured once again to handle the new generation of Boeing Delta IV's. The first launch of the Delta IV heavy from SLC-6 occurred in June 2006, launching NROL-22, a classified satellite for the U.S. National Reconnaissance Office (NRO).

== Final design ==
Final semi-reusable design with throwaway external fuel tank and recoverable solid rocket boosters

While NASA would likely have chosen liquid boosters had it had complete control over the design, the Office of Management and Budget insisted on less expensive solid boosters due to their lower projected development costs. While a liquid-fueled booster design provided better performance, lower per-flight costs, less environmental impact and less developmental risk, solid boosters were seen as requiring less funding to develop at a time when the Shuttle program had many different elements competing for limited development funds. The final design which was selected was a winged orbiter with three liquid-fueled engines, a large expendable external tank which held liquid propellant for these engines, and two reusable solid rocket boosters.

In the spring of 1972 Lockheed Aircraft, McDonnell Douglas, Grumman, and North American Rockwell submitted proposals to build the shuttle. The NASA selection group thought that Lockheed's shuttle was too complex and too expensive, and the company had no experience with building crewed spacecraft. McDonnell Douglas's was too expensive and had technical issues. Grumman had an excellent design which also seemed too expensive. North American's shuttle had the lowest cost and most realistic cost projections, its design was the easiest for ongoing maintenance, and the Apollo 13 accident involving North American's command and service module demonstrated its experience with electrical system failures. NASA announced its choice of North American on July 26, 1972.

The Space Shuttle program used the HAL/S programming language. The first microprocessor used was the 8088 and later the 80386. The Space Shuttle orbiter avionics computer was the IBM AP-101.

== Retrospection ==
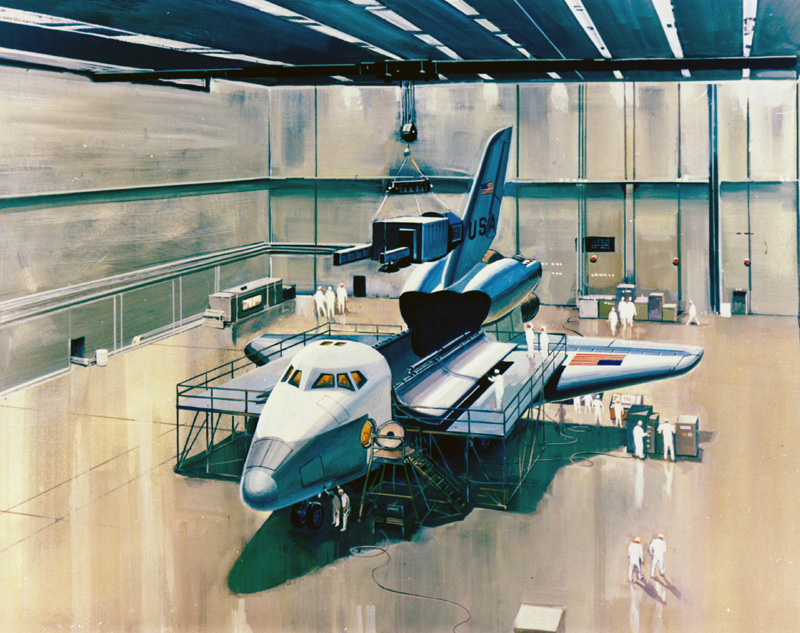
Early concept of how the Space Shuttle was to be serviced

Opinions differ on the lessons of the Shuttle. It was developed with the original development cost and time estimates given to President Richard M. Nixon in 1971, at a cost of $6.744 billion in 1971 dollars (equivalent to $41 billion in 2025) versus an original $5.15 billion estimate. The operational costs, flight rate, payload capacity, and reliability were different than anticipated, however.

== See also ==
- Buran (spacecraft)
- Single-stage-to-orbit
- Space Shuttle abort modes
- Space Shuttle program
- SpaceX Starship design process
- Studied Space Shuttle designs
