= DC3 =

DC3 or DC-3 may refer to:

== Music ==
- Danelectro DC-3, a guitar
- DC3 Music Group, a multi-media entertainment company
- DC3, British rapper and singer

=== Bands ===
- DC3 (band) (stylized: D.C. 3), a defunct American rock band
- The DC3, a defunct Australian rock band
- DC3 (Cory in the House), a fictional band from the TV show Cory in the House

== Transportation ==
- Datsun DC-3, a 1952 automobile
- Douglas DC-3, a 1930s aircraft
- North American DC-3, a cancelled space shuttle design

== Groups, organizations ==
- Department of Defense Cyber Crime Center (DC3), a United States defense organization
- Dodge City Community College, Dodge City, Kansas, U.S.

== Other uses ==
- Device Control Three, a control codes used in text by computer systems
  - DC3 (control picture), a Unicode pictograph for the DC3 control code
- DC 3 (lotto), a lotto run by the D.C. Lottery

== See also ==
- "DC×3" (Dead Cat Three Times), a 1997 single by Grinspoon off the album Guide to Better Living
- #DCDCDC, a hex triplet for the gainsboro shade of grey
- DCCC (disambiguation)
- 3Dc
- DC (disambiguation)
