= Maxime Faget =

American engineer 1921–2004

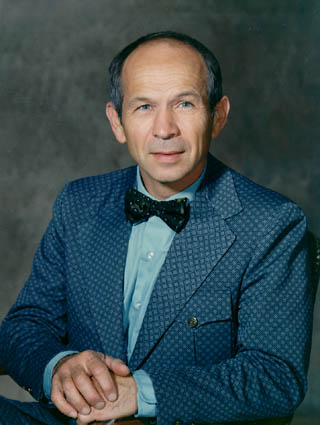
- Born: Maxime Allen Faget; August 26, 1921; Stann Creek Town, British Honduras (now Dangriga, Belize)
- Died: October 9, 2004 (aged 83); Houston, Texas, United States
- Other name: Max Faget
- Education: City College of San Francisco; Louisiana State University, B.S. 1943
- Occupation: Engineer
- Known for: Designer of the Mercury capsule
- Awards: ASME Medal (1975); NASA Outstanding Leadership Medal (1962)

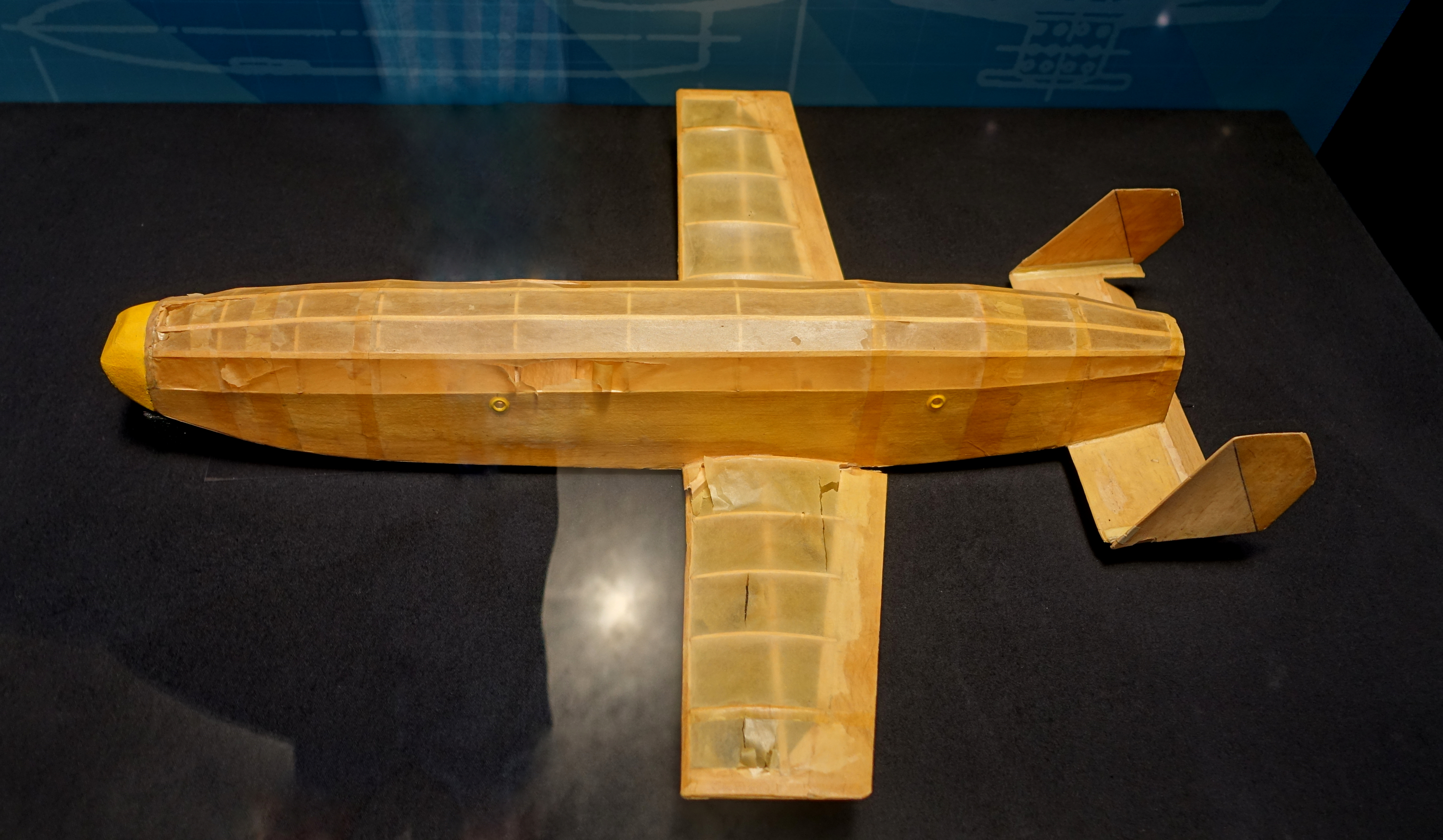
Space shuttle model, created by Faget, April 1, 1969

Maxime Allen "Max" Faget (pronounced fah-ZHAY; August 26, 1921 – October 9, 2004) was an American mechanical engineer. Faget was the designer of the Mercury spacecraft, and contributed to the later Gemini and Apollo spacecraft as well as the Space Shuttle.

== Life ==
Faget was the son of American doctor Guy Henry Faget, and great-grandson of another prominent physician, Jean Charles Faget. Born in Stann Creek Town, British Honduras (today Dangriga, Belize), he attended City College of San Francisco in San Francisco, California, and he received a Bachelor of Science degree in mechanical engineering from Louisiana State University in 1943.

After three years as a submariner aboard USS Guavina in the U.S. Navy, Faget joined the Langley Research Center in Hampton, Virginia as a research scientist. While working for NACA at Langley, he worked on the design of the X-15 hypersonic spacecraft.

In 1958, Faget became one of the 35 engineers who formed the Space Task Group, creating the Mercury spacecraft. He based his designs on the aerodynamic work of Harvey Allen from the mid-1950s, and was instrumental in selecting the blunt-body shape that won the Mercury competition over numerous contenders. He led the development of the escape tower system used on Mercury, which was used in various forms on almost all following crewed spacecraft. He also worked on the Gemini and Apollo vehicles, which shared many design points with the Mercury.

Faget filed a patent for a space shuttle vehicle design in 1972. His design, which he named "DC-3" in homage to the famed Douglas DC-3 airliner, was a small two-stage fully reusable shuttle with a payload capacity around 15,000 pounds (6,800 kg). DC-3 was officially studied by North American Aviation and shown in the press as a baseline contender for the Space Transportation System (STS). North American also studied a version of the same basic system with a much larger 50,000 pounds (23,000 kg) payload. However, the DC-3's nose-high re-entry profile was controversial, and eventually doomed it when the U.S. Air Force joined the Shuttle program and demanded cross-range performance that the DC-3 could not meet. In the end, its most lasting contribution was to clearly identify the trade-offs inherent in any reusable design.

In 1962 Faget became the Director of Engineering and Development at the Manned Spacecraft Center and continued to work for NASA until his retirement in 1981, shortly after the second Space Shuttle flight (STS-2). After his retirement, he was among the founders of Space Industries Inc., established in 1982. One of the projects of the company was the Wake Shield Facility, a device to create near-perfect vacuum in the thermosphere. The WSF flew three times with a Space Shuttle in 1994–1996 (STS-60, STS-69, STS-80).

In 1962, Faget received the Golden Plate Award of the American Academy of Achievement. Faget was inducted into the 1969 National Inventors Hall of Fame, and received the NASA Outstanding Leadership Medal and John J. Montgomery Award. He was inducted into the Houston National Space Hall of Fame in 1969, the International Space Hall of Fame in 1990, and the National Aviation Hall of Fame in 2020.

Faget died of bladder cancer on October 9, 2004, aged 83.

== Patents ==
Faget was co-inventor on five United States patents issued to Space Industries, Inc. between 1988 and 1992:

Patent No.	Title
U.S. patent 4,728,061	Spacecraft operable in two alternative flight modes
U.S. patent 4,747,567	Spacecraft with articulated solar array
U.S. patent 4,834,325	Modular spacecraft system
U.S. patent 4,903,919	Apparatus and method for docking spacecraft
U.S. patent 5,104,070	Structural latch for vehicle coupling mechanisms

== See also ==
- Sergei Korolev
