= Digital Copyright Canada Forum =

The Digital Copyright Canada forum was started in August 2001 by Russell McOrmond to allow for a public response to that phase of the Canadian copyright revision process. While the forum focuses on digital copyright, related issues of patents, copyright, trademarks (PCT) and other sui generis protections are included.

== About ==
Many of the participants are proponents of more recent "commons-based peer production" methodologies which include Free/Libre and Open Source Software (FLOSS) and the Creative Commons. Members represent both creators and users. Most creator members feel the greatest threat to their rights is not copyright infringement, but excessive control by past creators who stifle creativity that builds upon the past.

Activities include discussion forums, an active blog, letter writing to Members of Canadian Parliament, and two petitions: The Petition for Users Rights and the Petition to protect Information Technology Property rights.

Members of this forum met with members of the House of Commons of Canada to discuss digital copyright and related issues in the hope that they will take the concerns of this group into consideration with proposed bills such as Bill C-60 tabled by the Liberal Government in June 2005 and upcoming legislation proposed by the Conservative Government.

== See also ==
- Copyright Act of Canada
- Bill C-60
- Captain Copyright
- Private copying levy
- Digital rights management
- MP3 Newswire
