= Kankoh-maru =

Japanese orbital vehicle design

- Artist's concept of Kankoh-maru
- Function: Crewed re-usable rocket
- Country of origin: Japan

Size
- Height: 23.5 m (77 ft)
- Diameter: 18 m (59 ft)
- Mass: 550 t (1,210,000 lb)
- Stages: 1

Capacity

Payload to LEO
- Mass: 50 t (110,000 lb)

Launch history
- Status: Proposed

First stage
- Thrust: 6,888,000 N (1,548,000 lbf)

Boosters
- Total thrust: 2,900,000 N (650,000 lbf)

The Kankoh-maru (観光丸, Kankōmaru) is a proposed vertical takeoff and landing (VTVL), single-stage-to-orbit (SSTO), reusable launch system (rocket-powered spacecraft) by the Japanese Rocket Society.

== Overview ==
The concept was proposed by the Japanese Rocket Society in 1993. Although it was not an official project of any aerospace company, and no manufacturing plan was ever confirmed, a hypothetical flight manual presented at the July 1997 International Space Conference of Pacific-Basin Societies (ISCOPS) refers to the vehicle as the Kawasaki S-1. The estimated development cost was about ¥3.8 trillion (1995) (US$40.4 billion) in 1995.

The name Kankō Maru is derived from the first steam-powered vessel in Edo-era Japan.

== See also ==
- Chrysler SERV
- VentureStar
- Reusable Vehicle Testing program by JAXA/ISAS
- Blue Origin New Shepard
- Falcon 9 Full Thrust
