= DCCC =

DCCC may refer to:

== In general ==
- 800 (number), in Roman numerals
- 800 A.D., a year of the Common Era

== Groups, organizations ==
=== England ===
- Derbyshire County Cricket Club
- Durham County Cricket Club

=== United States ===
- Davidson County Community College, North Carolina
- Delaware County Community College, Pennsylvania
- Democratic Congressional Campaign Committee, Washington DC
- Dodge City Community College, Kansas

== Other uses ==
- droplet counter current chromatography, a type of countercurrent chromatography

== See also ==
- DDDC
- DC3 (disambiguation)
- DCC (disambiguation)
- DC (disambiguation)
