= Richard Menta =

American journalist

- Occupations: Information Security Executive, Journalist
- Notable credit(s): MP3 Newswire SC Magazine, Digital Music News, MP3.com, Amazon.com
- Title: Publisher MP3 Newswire
- Website: http://www.mp3newswire.net

Richard Menta is an American journalist, and the publisher of MP3 Newswire. Known for over a decade of commentary that followed the evolution of digital media and intellectual property protection, Menta is also an information security professional.

== Career ==
During the 1990s Menta worked for various publishers, including Simon and Schuster and American Lawyer Media, where he built business models designed to leverage offline content into the online world. This included early experimentation with digital audio and video, which he oversaw, and this eventually led him to found MP3 Newswire.

By 1999 Menta steered MP3 Newswire to original content, making it a place for knowledgeable professionals to share their opinions.
