= Direct debit dividend contributions =

Direct Debit Dividend Contributions (3DC) are payments made towards shareholders for shares which have been issued on credit.

Issuing stock on credit is considered appropriate when a Stakeholder (such as company's founder or other key person) wishes to retain involvement in a business but is unable to raise the capital required to pay for stock. In such circumstances the company's shareholders may agree to issue the desired level of stock against a plan where shares must be paid for through direct debit dividend contributions. 3DC differs from Stock options in that the recipient is awarded shareholder status from the moment the 3DC arrangement is agreed.

3DC is often regarded as a reward for efforts achieved (usually for the groundwork required in setting up a new business). It also serves as an incentive to ensure future performance of the company's stock.

== See also ==
- Direct debit
- Authorised capital
- Share capital
