= IEC 61355 =

IEC standard

The standard IEC 61355-1 Classification and designation of documents for plants, systems and equipment describes rules and guidelines for the uniform classification and identification of documents based on their characteristic content of information.

It is applied for all documents within the life cycle of a technical products like plants, systems or equipment. It also includes non-technical documents. The main application is the construction, erection and operation of industrial plants where the number of documents of all engineering disciplines may sum up to some 100,000 documents.

In 2024, the new cross-standard ISO/IEC 81355-1 was published and cancels and replaces IEC 61355-1 published in 2008. The new standard switches from "document classification" to "information classification" methods.

== Classification code ==
The standard provides with the document kind classification code (DCC) a structured letter-code for the classification of any kind of document.

A public access database IEC 61355 DB is available in order to facilitate the individuation of the correct code to be applied to a document

The document kind classification code consists of three code-letters A1, A2, A3, with the prefix "&".

- A1 Letter code for technical area class
- A2 Letter code for main class
- A3 Letter code for sub-class

The letter code A1 is optional, if all documents are from the same technical area. The letter codes A2 and A3 are identical for all technical areas.

== Technical Areas ==
The technical areas are:

A1	Technical area
A	Overall management
B	Overall technology
C	Construction engineering
E	Electrical engineering, instrumentation and control engineering
M	Mechanical engineering (normally including process engineering))
P	Process engineering (only if separation from M is required))

== Classes ==
The main classes are:

A2	document kind classes, main classes
A	Documentation describing documents
B	Management documents
C	Contractual and non-technical documents
D	General technical information documents
E	Technical requirement and dimensioning documents
F	Function describing documents
L	Location documents
M	Connection describing documents
P	Object listings
Q	Quality management documents; safety-describing documents
T	Geometry-related documents
W	Operation records

== Main classes and subclasses ==
Table of main classes and subclasses

A2 A3	Document kind classes, main class and subclass	Examples of document kinds
A	Documentation describing documents	
AA	Administrative documents	Cover sheet; Title sheet
AB	Lists (regarding documents)	List of documents; List of contents Index
AC	Explanatory documents (regarding documents)	Document description; Documentation structure diagram
AD ... AY	Reserved for future standardization	
AZ	Free for user	
B	Management documents	
BA	Registers	Vendor list; Supplier list; Distribution list
BB	Reports	Meeting report; Status report; Technical report; Damage report; Installation report; Commissioning report; Handing over protocol
BC	Correspondence	Letter; Note
BD	Project control documents	Document interchange list; Time sheet
BE	Resource planning documents	Time schedule; Activity network plan; Resource load diagram
BF	Dispatch, storage and transport documents	Dispatch specification; Shipping list; Packing list; Airway bill; Bill of lading; Certificate of origin; Storage specification; Transport specification
BG	Site planning and site organization documents	Site specification for personnel
BH	Documents regarding changes	Change notification; Change request
BJ ... BR	Reserved for future standardization	
BS	Security documents	Escape plan; Emergency instruction; Fire protection plan; Noise protection plan
BT	Training specific documents	Training description
BU ... BY	Reserved for future standardization	
BZ	Free for user	
C	Contractual and nontechnical documents	
CA	Inquiry, calculation and offer documents	Inquiry; Calculation sheet (commercial); Offer; Letter of intent; Letter of acceptance
CB	Approval documents	Approval application; Acceptance/ authorization; License
CC	Contractual documents	Contract; Final acceptance certificate; Terms of delivery
CD	Order and delivery documents	Order; Delivery note
CE	Invoice documents	Invoice
CF	Insurance documents	Insurance policy; Damage assessment
CG	Warranty documents	Certificate of guarantee
CH	Expertises	Expertise
CJ ... CY	Reserved for future standardization	
CZ	Free for user	
D	General technical information documents	
DA	Data sheets	Data sheet; Dimension drawing
DB	Explanatory documents	System description; Structure diagram; Description of designation system
DC	Instructions and manuals	Manufacturing instructions; Installation instructions; Operating instructions; Inspection instructions; Maintenance instructions; Operation manual
DD	Technical reports	Technical report; R&D report
DE	Catalogues Advertising documents	Catalogue; Product leaflet
DF	Technical publications	Technical publication
DG ... DY	Reserved for future standardization	
DZ	Free for user	
E	Technical requirement and dimensioning documents	
EA	Legal requirement documents	Building regulation; Operation decree; Environmental decree
EB	Standards and regulations	IEC standard; ISO standard
EC	Technical specification / requirement documents	Requirement specification; Technical specification; Consumer list; Component / device list of instrumentation and control equipment; Measuring point and criteria list; List of motors and loads; Test specification; Material specification
ED	Dimensioning documents	Calculation sheet (technical)
EE ... EY	Reserved for future standardization	
EZ	Free for user	
F	Function-describing documents	
FA	Functional overview documents	Network map
FB	Flow diagrams	Block diagram; Process flow diagram (PFD); Piping and instrumentation diagram (P & ID); Utility flow diagram (UFD)
FC	MMI layout documents (MMI = man-machine interface)	Screen display layout drawing
FD	Reserved for future standardization	
FE	Function descriptions	Function description
FF	Function diagrams	Function diagram; Logic function diagram; Function chart; Sequence chart; Equivalent circuit diagram; Time sequence chart
FG ... FN	Reserved for future standardization	
FP	Signal descriptions	Signal list
FQ	Setting value documents	Setting list
FR	Reserved for future standardization	
FS	Circuitry documents	Circuit diagram
FT	Software specific documents	Program diagram; Code list; Design description
FU ... FY	Reserved for future standardization	
FZ	Free for user	
L	Location documents	
LA	Exploitation and survey documents	Ground plan
LB	Earthwork and foundation work documents	Excavation plan; Foundation drawing
LC	Building carcass documents	Reinforcement plan; Static drawing
LD	On-site location documents	Arrangement drawing (site); Site plan; Installation drawing (site); Installation diagram (site); Cable routing drawing (site); Earthing plan, drawing (site)
LE ... LG	Reserved for future standardization	
LH	In-building location documents (also applied for ships, aircraft, etc.)	Arrangement drawing (building); Building drawing; Installation diagram (building); Cable routing drawing (building); Earthing drawing (building)
LJ ... LT	Reserved for future standardization	
LU	In/on-equipment location documents	Arrangement drawing (equipment); Assembly drawing
LV ... LY	Reserved for future standardization	
LZ	Free for user	
M	Connection-describing documents	
MA	Connection documents	Connection diagram; Connection table
MB	Cabling or piping documents	Cable diagram; Cable pulling card; Piping list
MC ... MY	Reserved for future standardization	
MZ	Free for user	
P	Object listings	
PA	Material lists	Material list
PB	Parts lists	Parts list; Spare parts list; Label list
PC	Item lists	Item list
PD	Product lists and product type lists	Product list; Product type list
PE	Reserved for future standardization	
PF	Function lists	Function list
PG ... PK	Reserved for future standardization	
PL	Location lists	Location list
PM ... PY	Reserved for future standardization	
PZ	Free for user	
Q	Quality management documents and safety-describing documents	
QA	Quality management documents	Quality manual; Quality plan; Quality record; Quality guideline; Audit plan; Audit report; Non-conformity report; Declaration of conformity
QB	Safety-describing documents	Safety study; Risk assessment
QC	Quality verifying documents	Test certificate; Material certificate; Test report; Fault report
QD ... QY	Reserved for future standardization	
QZ	Free for user	
T	Geometrical form describing documents	
TA	Planning drawings	Concept drawing; Design drawing
TB	Construction drawings	Dimension drawing; Interface drawing; Exploded-view drawing; 3D-drawing
TC	Manufacturing and erection drawings	Manufacturing drawing; Drilling plan; Welding plan
TD ... TK	Reserved for future standardization	
TL	Arrangement documents	Layout drawing
TM ... TY	Reserved for future standardization	
TZ	Free for user	
W	Operational protocols and records	
WA	Set point documents	Batch recipe
WB ... WS	Reserved for future standardization	
WT	Logbooks	Operational log; Maintenance and modification log; Test log
WU ... WY	Reserved for future standardization	
WZ	Free for user	

Source: IEC 61355–1
