= Space Transportation System =

Proposed system of reusable manned space vehicles

Space Transportation System, Integrated Program Plan
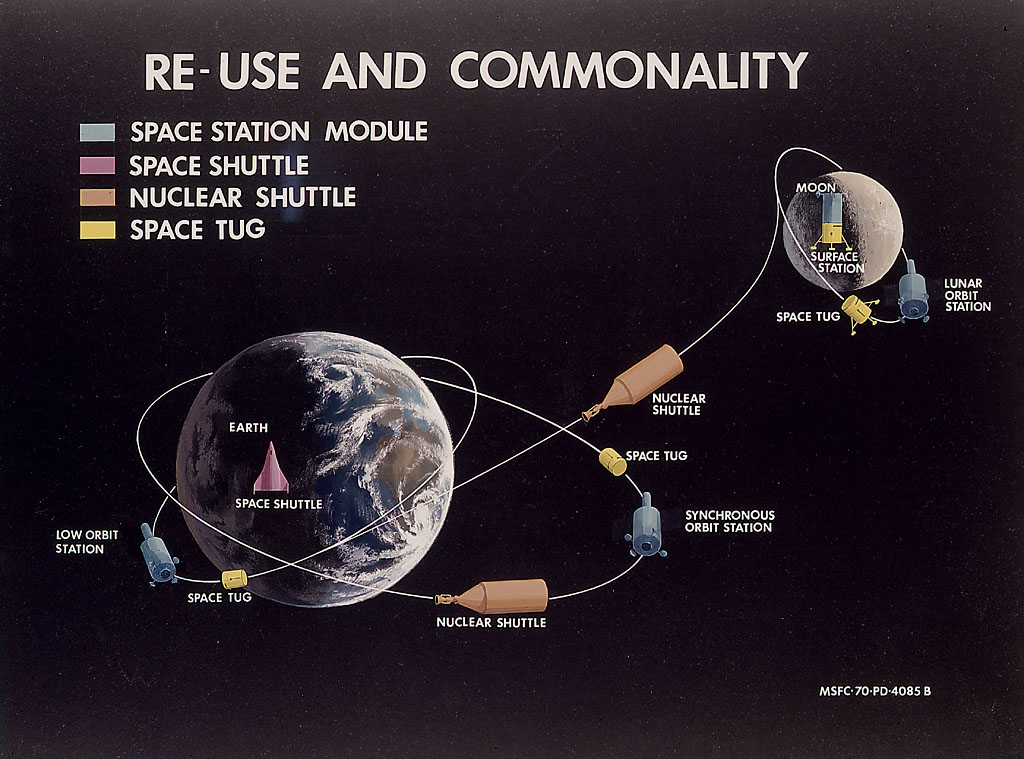
- 1970 artist's concept illustrating use of a Space Shuttle, Nuclear Shuttle, and Space Tug

Program overview
- Country: United States
- Organization: NASA Office of Manned Spaceflight
- Manager: George Mueller
- Purpose: Reusable, low-cost transportation to Earth orbit, cislunar and interplanetary space
- Status: Failed to gain political support

Program history
- Launch site: Kennedy Space Center

Vehicle information
- Uncrewed vehicle: Space tug
- Crewed vehicles: Space shuttle; Space tug; Nuclear shuttle; Space station module

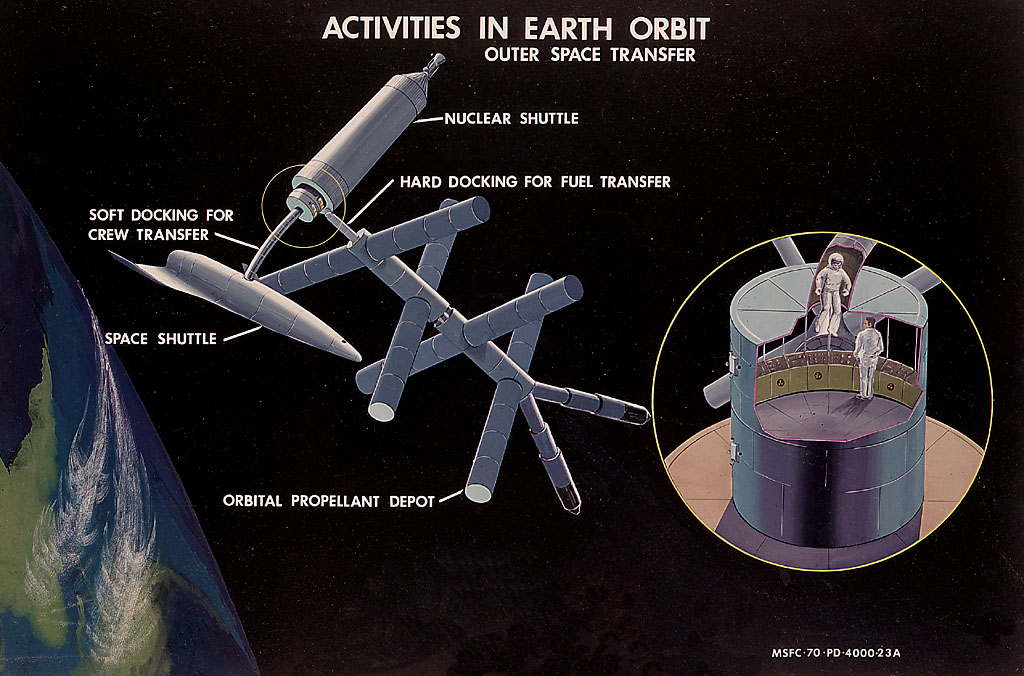
Nuclear Ferry and Shuttle Orbiter docked to an Orbital Propellant Depot

The Space Transportation System (STS), also known internally to NASA as the Integrated Program Plan (IPP), was a proposed system of reusable crewed space vehicles envisioned in 1969 to support extended operations beyond the Apollo program (NASA appropriated the name for its Space Shuttle program, the only component of the proposal to survive Congressional funding approval). The purpose of the system was two-fold: to reduce the cost of spaceflight by replacing the existing method of launching capsules on expendable rockets with reusable spacecraft; and to support ambitious follow-on programs including permanent orbiting space stations around Earth and the Moon, and a human landing mission to Mars.

In February 1969, President Richard Nixon appointed a Space Task Group headed by Vice President Spiro Agnew to recommend human space projects beyond Apollo. The group responded in September with the outline of the STS, and three different program levels of effort culminating with a human Mars landing by 1983 at the earliest, and by the end of the twentieth century at the latest. The system's major components consisted of:

- A permanent space station module designed for 6 to 12 occupants, in a 270-nautical-mile (500 km) low Earth orbit, and as a permanent lunar orbit station. Modules could be combined in Earth orbit to create a 50 to 100 person permanent station.
- A chemically fueled Earth-to-orbit shuttle.
- A chemically fueled space tug to move crew and equipment between Earth orbits as high as geosynchronous orbit, which could be adapted as a lunar orbit-to-surface shuttle.
- A nuclear-powered shuttle or ferry using the NERVA engine, to move crew, spacecraft and supplies between low Earth orbit and lunar orbit, geosynchronous orbit, or to other planets in the solar system. A crew module derived from the space station module would be used to send humans to the Moon or Mars.

The tug and ferry vehicles would be of a modular design, allowing them to be clustered, staged, or both for large payloads or interplanetary missions. The system would be supported by permanent Earth and lunar orbital propellant depots. The Saturn V might still have been used as a heavy lift launch vehicle for the nuclear ferry and space station modules. A special "Mars Excursion Module" would be the only remaining vehicle necessary for a human-Mars landing.

The STS was championed by NASA administrator Thomas O. Paine until May 1969 and gained Agnew's enthusiastic support. However, as Apollo accomplished its objective of landing the first humans on the Moon, Nixon realized that political support for further crewed space activities was beginning to wane, and Congress would be unwilling to provide funding for most of these extended activities. Based on this, Nixon rejected all parts of the program except the Space Shuttle, which inherited the STS name. Nixon accepted Paine's resignation in July 1970 and replaced him as administrator with James C. Fletcher.

As a result of funding constraints, Shuttle was significantly scaled back from its planned degree of reusability. The overall program scheduled was also delayed. The Shuttle first flew in 1981, and was retired in 2011.

A second part of the system, Space Station Freedom, was approved in the early 1980s and announced in 1984 by President Ronald Reagan. However, this also became politically unviable by 1993, and was replaced with the International Space Station (ISS), with substantial contribution by Russia. The ISS was completed in 2011.

== System vehicles ==
=== Earth-to-orbit shuttle ===
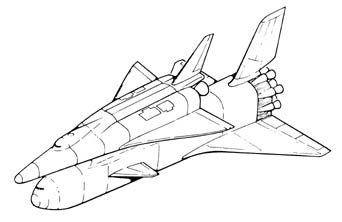
Early North American Rockwell shuttle concept, 1969

The system was supposed to include a "space shuttle", sometimes also referred to as an "Earth-to-orbit shuttle", for ferrying crew and supplies to Low Earth Orbit. Larger payloads like nuclear tugs or space station modules would be transported by an upgraded version of the Saturn V rocket, specializing the "shuttle" to relatively low-mass, high-frequency payloads like crew rotations, liquid hydrogen fuel, and liquid oxygen oxidizer. This vehicle is arguably the only one that was realized with the Space Shuttle, albeit significantly scaled back in nearly all aspects, and for most of its operational life left lacking the infrastructure it was supposed to support.

=== Space tug ===
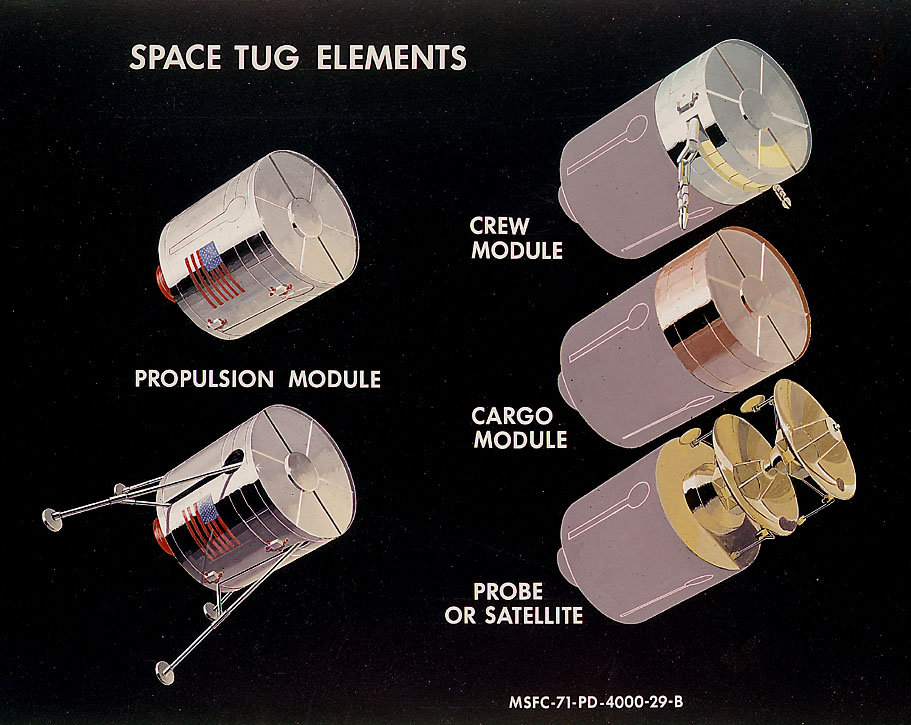
1971 Marshall Space Flight Center (MSFC) concept drawing of the space tug

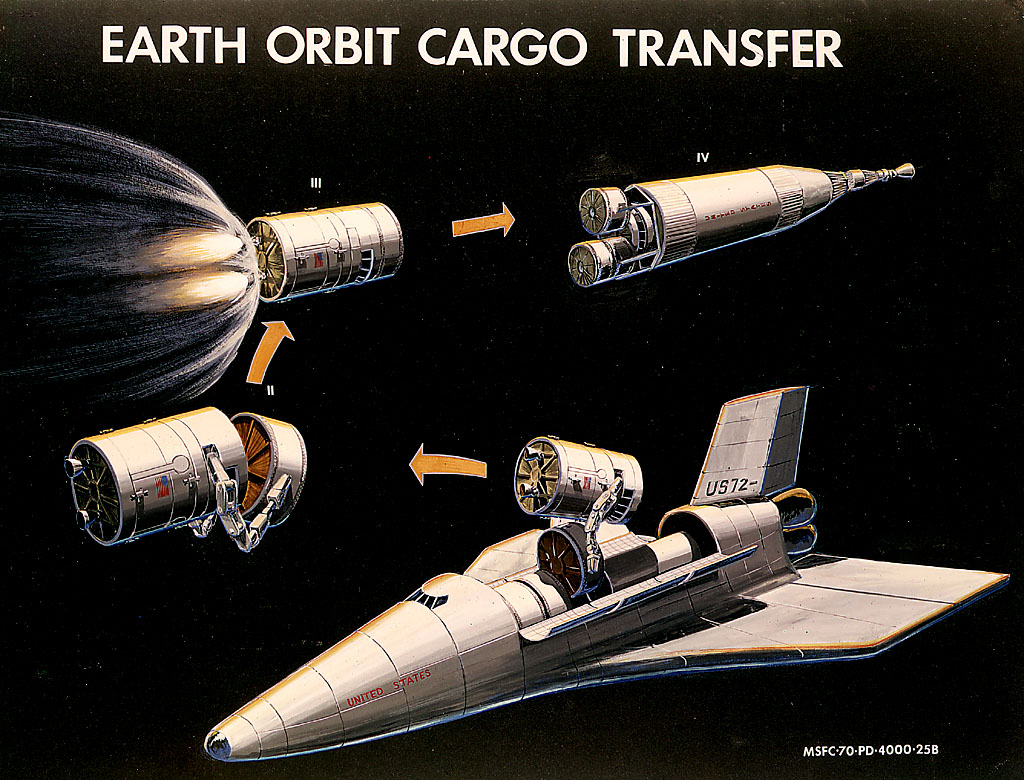
Demonstration of a Space Tug moving a cargo module from a Shuttle Orbiter to a Nuclear Shuttle

The MSFC space tug was designed to handle a number of missions including satellite repair, transfer to geosynchronous orbit, and as the name implies, towing payloads to the nuclear shuttle. Its modular design was centered around a cylindrical propulsion module, with an attachable crew module, cargo module, and lunar landing legs to convert it to a lunar orbit-to-surface shuttle. It was supposed to use liquid hydrogen and oxygen as its fuel and oxidizer, carried into orbit by the Earth-to-orbit shuttle.

=== Nuclear ferry ===
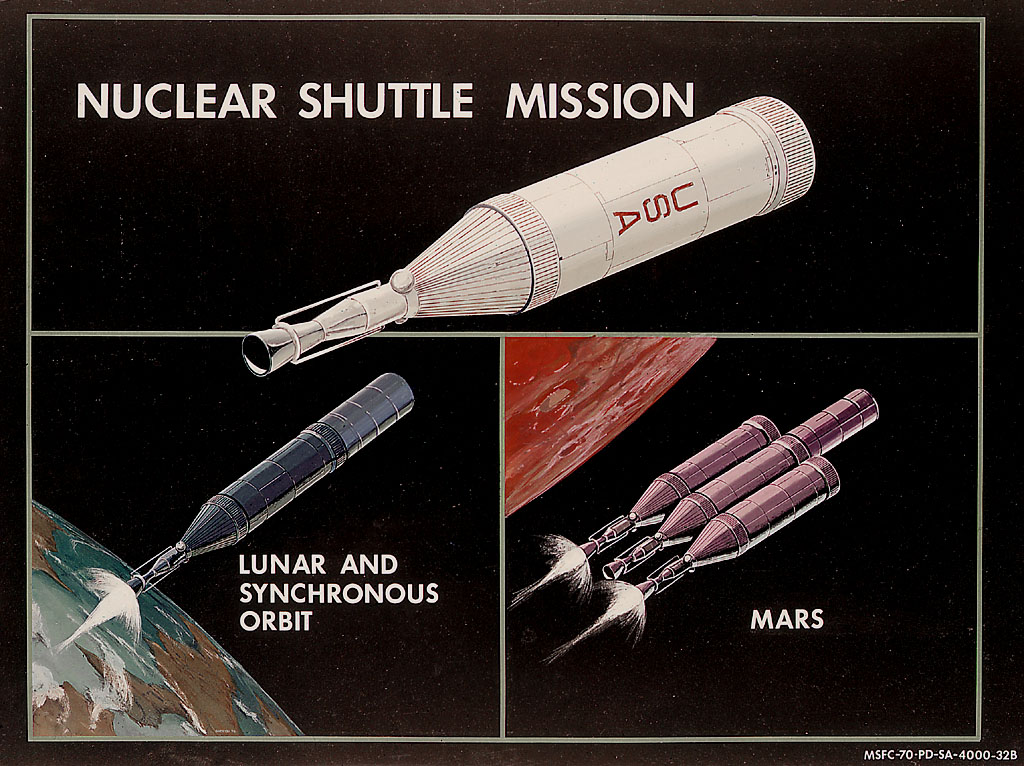
1971 MSFC drawing illustrates use of the nuclear shuttle (ferry) for lunar orbit, or Mars orbit missions

Planned uses for NERVA included a visit to Mars by 1978 and a permanent lunar base by 1981. NERVA rockets would be used for "nuclear tugs" or "nuclear shuttles" designed to take payloads from Low Earth Orbit to farther orbits, resupply of several space stations in various orbits around the Earth and Moon, and support for a permanent lunar base. The NERVA rocket would also be used in the Saturn S-N, an upper stage for the Saturn V rocket' upgrading the Saturn's low Earth orbit (LEO) capability to 340,000 pounds (150 t), as well as be used to propel a pair of Mars expedition vehicles.

=== Space station module ===
The program was supposed to include multiple space stations, built out of standardized space station modules. Those would be emplaced in low Earth orbit, polar Earth orbit, geostationary orbit, and lunar orbit. The Mars-focused aspects of the plan were supposed to use the station modules as crew sections for its Mars Transfer Vehicles.
