= North American DC-3 =

NASA Space Shuttle design candidate

DC-3
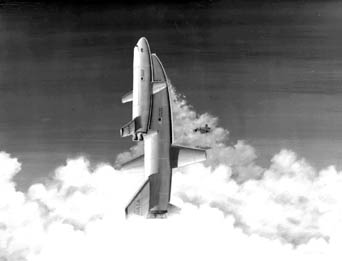
- Designer: Maxime Faget
- Country of origin: United States

Specifications
- Payload capacity: 12,000 pounds (5,400 kg)

The DC-3 was one of several early design proposals for the NASA Space Shuttle designed by Maxime Faget at the Manned Spacecraft Center (MSC) in Houston. It was nominally developed by North American Aviation (NAA), although it was a purely NASA-internal design. Unlike the design that eventually emerged, the DC-3 was a fully reusable launch vehicle two-stage-to-orbit spaceplane design with a small payload capacity of about 12,000 lb (5,400 kg) and limited maneuverability. Its inherent strengths were good low-speed handling during landing, and a low-risk development that was relatively immune to changes in weight and balance.

Work on the DC-3 program ended when the US Air Force joined the Shuttle program and demanded a much greater "cross-range" maneuverability than the DC-3 could deliver. There were also serious concerns about its stability during re-entry, as well as heating conditions on its straight wings. NAA eventually won the Shuttle Orbiter contract, based on a very different design from another team at MSC.

== History ==
=== Background ===
In the mid-1960s the US Air Force conducted a series of classified studies on next-generation space transportation systems. Among their many goals, the new launchers were intended to support a continued crewed military presence in space, and so needed to dramatically lower the cost of launches and increase launch rates. Selecting from a series of proposals, the Air Force concluded that semi-reusable designs were the best choice from an overall cost basis, and the Lockheed Star Clipper design was one of the most-studied examples. They proposed a development program with an immediate start on a "Class I" vehicle based on expendable boosters, followed by a slower development of a "Class II" semi-reusable design, and perhaps a "Class III" fully reusable design in the further future. Although it is estimated that the Air Force spent up to $1 billion on the associated studies, only the Class I program proceeded to development, as the X-20 Dyna-Soar, which was later cancelled.

Not long after the Air Force studies, NASA started studying the post-Project Apollo era. A wide variety of projects were examined, many based on re-using Apollo hardware (Apollo X, Apollo Applications Program, etc.) Flush with the success of the Moon landings, a series of ever-more ambitious projects gained currency, a process that was considerably expanded under the new NASA director, Thomas O. Paine. By about 1970 these had settled on the near-term launching of a 12-man space station in 1975, expanding this to a 50-man "space base" by 1980, a smaller lunar-orbiting station, and then eventually a crewed mission to Mars in the 1980s. NASA awarded $2.9-million study contracts for the space stations to North American and McDonnell Douglas in July 1969.

Almost as an afterthought the idea of a small and inexpensive "logistics vehicle" for supporting these missions developed in the late 1960s. George Mueller was handed the task of developing plans for such a system, and held a one-day symposium at NASA headquarters in December 1967 to study various options. Eighty people attended and presented a wide variety of potential designs, many from the earlier Air Force work, from small Dyna-Soar-like vehicles primarily carrying crew and launched on existing expendable boosters, to much larger fully reusable designs.

=== ILRV ===
On 30 October 1968 NASA officially began work on what was then known as the "Integral Launch and Re-entry Vehicle" (ILRV), a name they borrowed from the earlier Air Force studies. The development program was to take place in four phases; Phase A: Advanced Studies; Phase B: Project Definition; Phase C: Vehicle Design; and Phase D: Production and Operations. Four teams were to participate in Phase A; two in Phase B; and then a single prime contractor for Phases C and D. A separate Space Shuttle Main Engine (SSME) competition was to run in parallel.

NASA Houston and Huntsville jointly issued the Request for Proposal (RFP) for eight-month Phase A ILRV studies. The requirements were for 5,000 to 50,000 lb of payload to be delivered into a 500 km altitude orbit. The re-entry vehicle should have a cross range of at least 450 miles, meaning that it could fly to the left or right of its normal orbital path. General Dynamics, Lockheed, McDonnell-Douglas, Martin Marietta, and (the newly named) North American Rockwell were invited to bid. In February 1969, following study of the RFPs, Martin Marietta's entry was dropped, although they continued work on their own. The other entries were all given additional Phase A funding.

Supported by Paine's ambitious plans, in August 1969 the ILRV program was re-defined to be a "maximum effort" design, and only fully reusable designs would be accepted. This led to a second series of Phase A studies. The designs that were returned varied widely, meeting the huge payload range specified in the original RFP. Two basic fuselage designs seemed to be the most common; lifting body designs that offered high cross-range but limited maneuverability after re-entry, and delta-winged designs that reversed these criteria.

=== DC-3 ===
Faget felt that all of the proposed designs incorporated an unacceptable amount of development risk. Unlike a conventional aircraft, with separate fuselage and wings, the ILRV designs had blended wing-body layouts. This meant that changes in weight and balance, which are almost unavoidable during development, would require changes to the entire orbiter structure to compensate. He also felt that the poor low-speed handling of any of these layouts presented a real danger during landing. Upset by what he felt was a project that seemed to guarantee failure, he started work on his own design, and presented it as the DC-3.

Unlike the other entries, DC-3 was much more conventional in layout, with an almost cylindrical fuselage and low-mounted slightly swept wings. The design looked more like a cargo aircraft than a spacecraft. Re-entry was accomplished in a 60 degree nose-high attitude that presented the lower surface of the spacecraft to the airflow, using a ballistic blunt-body approach that was similar to the one Faget had successfully pioneered on the Mercury capsule. During re-entry, the wings provided little or no aerodynamic lift. After re-entry, when the spacecraft entered the lower atmosphere, it would pitch over into a conventional flying attitude, ducts would open, and jet engines would start up for landing.

The upside of this design approach was that changes in the weight and balance could be addressed simply by moving the wing or re-shaping it, a common solution that had been used for decades in aircraft design—including the original Douglas DC-3 whose wings were swept rearward for just this reason. The downside was that the spacecraft would have little hypersonic lift, so its ability to maneuver while re-entering would be limited and its cross-range would be about 300 miles. It could make up for some of this with its improved low-speed flying ability, but would still not be able to match the mandated 450 miles. The ballistic portion of its reentry profile also meant flying in a stall, which many NASA astronauts perceived as risky.

Although the DC-3 had never been part of the original ILRV plans, Faget's name was so well respected that others at NASA MSC in Houston quickly rallied around him. Other NASA departments all selected their own favorite designs, including recoverable versions of Saturn boosters developed at the Marshall Space Flight Center in Huntsville, lifting-bodies based on the HL-10 that were favored by the Langley Research Center and Dryden Flight Research Center (Edwards), and even a single-stage-to-orbit Aerospaceplane was also proposed. From then on, the entire program was beset with in-fighting between the various teams. On 1 June 1969, a report was published that attacked the DC-3 design, followed by several others over the remainder of the year. In spite of this, North American quickly took up the DC-3 design, having learned over the years that the best way to win a NASA contract was to make whatever design Faget favored. They won contract NAS9-9205 to develop the DC-3 in December 1969.

In order to clear the logjam developing between the departments, on 23 January 1970 a meeting was held in Houston to study all of the in-house concepts. Over the next year a number of proposed designs would be dropped, including the entire series of lifting-body-derived vehicles as it proved too difficult to fit cylindrical tanks into the airframe. This left two basic approaches, delta wings and Faget's DC-3 series. Development of the DC-3 continued, with a drop test of a 1/10-scale model starting on 4 May.

=== Space Task Group ===
On 12 February 1969 Richard Nixon formed the Space Task Group under the direction of Vice President Spiro Agnew, giving them the task of selecting missions for a post-Apollo NASA. Agnew quickly became a proponent of NASA's ambitious plans that would culminate in a Mars attempt. The Task Group's final report, delivered on 11 September 1969, outlined three broad plans; the first required funding at $8 to $10 billion a year and would fulfill all of NASA's goals, the second would reduce this to $8 billion or less if the crewed lunar orbiting station was dropped, and finally the third would require only $5 billion a year and would develop only the space stations and shuttle.

At first Nixon did not comment on the plans. Later he demanded that the program be greatly reduced even from the smallest of the Task Group's proposals, forcing them to select either the space base or the shuttle. Discussing the problem, NASA engineers concluded that the development of a shuttle would lower the cost of launching portions of the space station, so it seemed that proceeding with the shuttle might make the future development of the station more likely. However, NASA's estimates of the shuttle development costs were met with great skepticism by the Office of Management and Budget (OMB). Studies by RAND in 1970 showed that there was no benefit to developing a reusable spacecraft when development costs were taken into account. The report concluded that a crewed station would be more cheaply supported with expendable boosters.

By this time Paine had left NASA to return to General Electric, and had been replaced by the more pragmatic James Fletcher. Fletcher ordered independent reviews of the shuttle concept; Lockheed was to prepare a report on how the shuttle could reduce payload costs, Aerospace Corporation was to make an independent report on development and operational costs, and Mathematica would later combine these two into a final definitive report. Mathematica's report was extremely positive; it showed that development of a fully reusable design would lower the per-launch cost, thereby reducing payload costs and driving up demand. However, the report was based on a greatly increased rate of launch; inherent in the math was that lower launch rates would completely upset any advantage. Nevertheless, the report was extremely influential, and made the shuttle program an ongoing topic of discussion in Washington.

Looking to shore up support for the program, Fletcher directed NASA to develop the shuttle to be able to support the Air Force's requirements as well, as initially developed in their "Class III" fully reusable vehicles. If the shuttle became vital to the Air Force as well as NASA, it would be effectively unkillable. The Air Force's requirements were based on a projected series of large spy satellites then under development, which were 60 feet long and weighed 40,000 lbs. They needed to be launched into polar orbits, corresponding to a normal launch from Kennedy Space Center (KSC) of 65,000 lbs (launches to the east receive a free boost from the Earth's natural rotation).

The Air Force also demanded a cross-range capability of 1,500 miles, meaning that the spacecraft would have to be able to land at a point 1,500 miles (2,400 km) to either side of its orbital path when it started re-entry. This was due to the desire to be able to land again after one orbit, the so-called "orbit-once-around". This capacity was useful to NASA as well, as it made more abort possibilities available if needed.

=== End of DC-3 ===
The new cross-range requirements doomed the DC-3 design.

Satellites orbit around the center of the Earth, not the surface. If a spacecraft were launched due East from the equator into a 90-minute low Earth orbit, it will circle the Earth and return to the spot where it was launched 90 minutes later. However, the launch site will have moved due to the Earth's rotation. Over the 90-minute period, the Earth would rotate 2,500 kilometres (1,600 miles) to the east, escaping from the spacecraft as it returns. Given the orbital speed about 28,000 kilometres per hour (17,000 mph), simply starting the re-entry about 5 minutes later than the complete 90-minute orbit would make up this difference.

At Kennedy Space Center's 28.5° north latitude the situation is more complicated. Over the 90-minute orbit KSC will rotate about 1,350 miles (2,170 km). Unlike the equatorial orbit case, however, letting the spacecraft stay in the inclined orbit a little longer will start taking it south of the launch site (for the most efficient launch eastward, where the orbital inclination is equal to the launch latitude, making the launch point the most northerly of its ground path), its closest point of approach being about 300 miles (480 km) to the southwest. A spacecraft wishing to return to its launch site will need about 300 miles of cross-range maneuverability during re-entry, and the NASA shuttle designs demanded about 450 miles in order to have some working room.

Polar orbits from the Air Force's Vandenberg Air Force Base are another matter entirely. At almost 35° N, the distance it would move over a single orbit would be slightly smaller than KSC, but critically, the shuttle would be traveling south, not east. This meant that it was not flying toward the launch point as it traveled in its orbit, and when it completed one orbit it would have to make up the entire 1,350 miles during re-entry. These missions required a dramatically improved cross-range capability, set at 1,500 miles to give it a slight reserve. The ballistic re-entry profile of the DC-3 series simply could not come close to matching this requirement.

On 1 May 1971 the OMB finally released a budget plan, limiting NASA to $3.2 billion per year for the next five years. Given existing project budgets, this limited any spending on the shuttle to about $1 billion a year, far less than required to develop any of the completely reusable designs. Based on these constraints, NASA returned to a Class II-like vehicle with external tankage, which led to the MSC-020 design. Later that year all straight-wing designs were officially abandoned, although Faget's team continued to work on them for some time in spite of this.

== Description ==
The DC-3 was a two-stage vehicle with a large booster and smaller shuttle/orbiter of overall similar design. Both were similar to "jumbo jets" in layout in general terms, with their large cylindrical fuselage containing fuel tanks instead of passengers or cargo. The bottom of the fuselage was flattened for re-entry aerodynamics, with a slight upward toward the nose in early models. The wings were low-mounted, in-line with the bottom of the fuselage, with a 14 degree rearward sweep on the front and no sweep on the back. The general layout of the wing planform was similar to the original DC-3. The empennage was a conventional three-surface unit, although in the original MSC-001 design the delta-shaped horizontal stabilizer was located at the bottom of the fuselage and served double-duty in protecting the rear-mounted engines during re-entry. Later versions did not generally include this feature, and used more conventional surfaces mid-mounted on the fuselage.

The orbiter carried a crew of two, and had accommodations for up to ten passengers. A cargo area was mounted in the middle of the craft between the liquid hydrogen (LH2) tank behind it, and a combined LH2/liquid oxygen tank in front of it. This arrangement was used in order to center the cargo over the wing, with the heavier oxygen and crew compartment balancing the weight of the engines. The lighter weight hydrogen then filled out the rest of the internal space. The booster had no cargo area, so it used a simpler arrangement of tankage with a single LH2 tank at the rear. The booster normally flew uncrewed, but included a two-person cockpit area that was used during ferry flights.

The orbiter was powered by two modified XLR-129 engines with the thrust increased from 250,000 to 300,000 lbf, two 15,000 lbf RL10 orbital manoeuvring engines, and six Rolls-Royce RB162 jet engines for landing. The booster used eleven of the same XLR-129 engines, and four Pratt & Whitney JT8D for landing. XLR-129s on both the shuttle and booster were fired for vertical take-off. The orbiter was mounted relatively far forward for launch, its tail in-line with the booster's wings. The combined weight at launch would be about 2,030 tons.

The orbiter would re-enter nose-high at an angle of about 60 degrees above horizontal, decelerating at a peak of 2G until it reached low subsonic speeds at 40,000 ft. At this point the forward speed of the craft would be very low, so the nose was pitched down and the orbiter dove to pick up airspeed over the wings and transition to level flight. Expected re-entry heating rates on the orbiter were 1650 deg C on the leading edge, and 790 deg C over 80% of the lower surface.

In order to maximize overall performance, the booster released the orbiter at Mach 10 and 45 miles altitude. This required the booster to carry a complete thermal protection system in order to re-enter for landing. Both the orbiter and booster were to be protected with the LI-1500 silica tiles similar to those eventually used on the Space Shuttle, a design that had recently been introduced by Lockheed and quickly became a baseline design for all of the shuttle contenders. As a result, both airframes were able to be built out of aluminum, greatly reducing airframe cost.

Both craft carried just enough JP-4 for landing go-around. Both could also carry increased loads of JP-4 for test flights or ferrying. After dispatching the orbiter the booster would be too far down-range to easily turn around and return to Kennedy, so the normal mission profile had it coast across the ocean, land automatically, refuel and pick up a crew, and then be flown back to Kennedy on its JT8D engines.

Lockheed estimated that development and initial production would cost $5.912 billion over a period from 1970 to 1975. A fleet of six orbiters and four boosters would have supported a launch rate of 50 flights per year.
