= George Mueller (engineer) =

American electrical and aerospace engineer

George E. Mueller
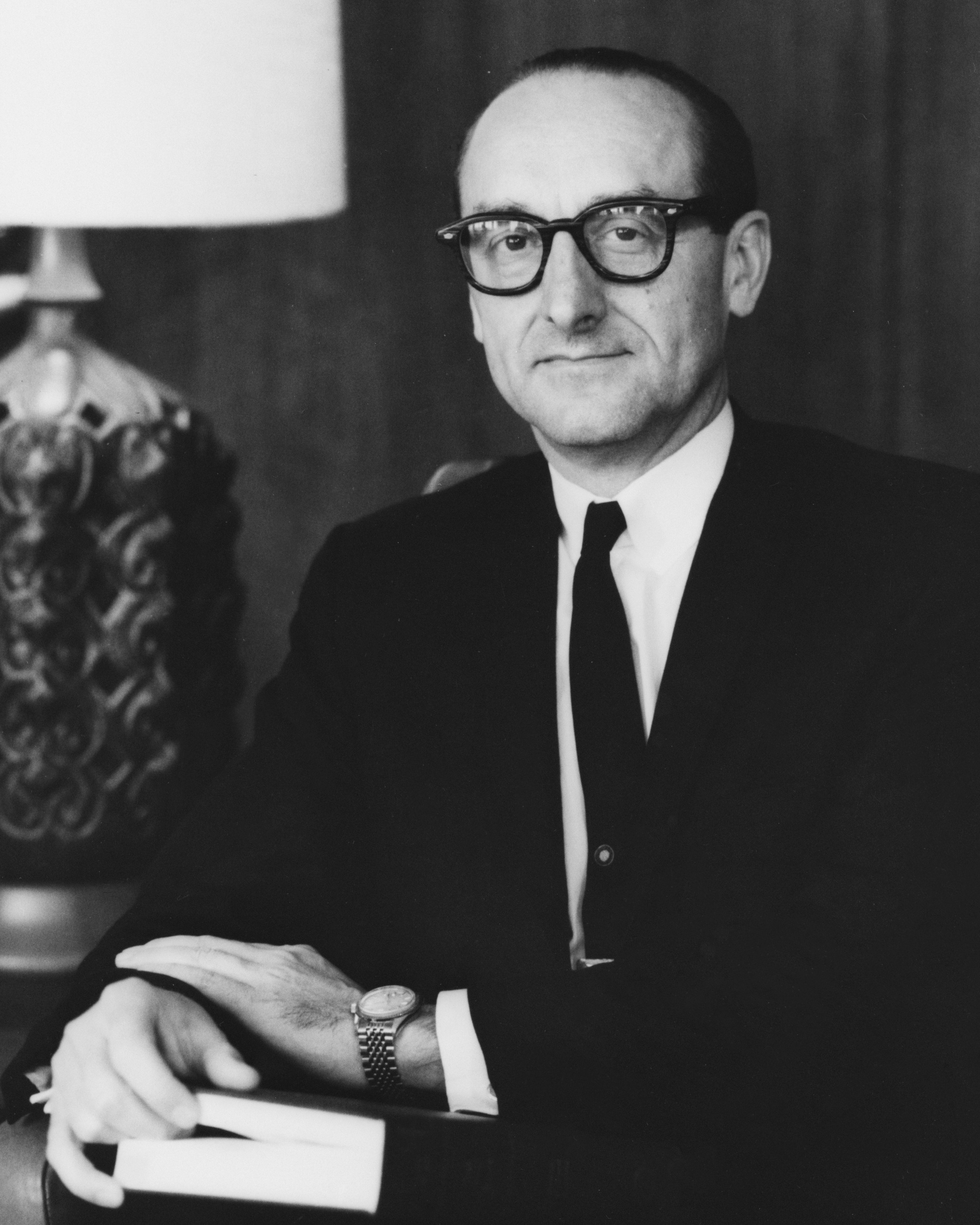
- Born: George Edwin Mueller; July 16, 1918; St. Louis, Missouri
- Died: October 12, 2015 (aged 97); Irvine, California
- Education: Missouri School of Mines and Metallurgy; Purdue University; Ohio State University
- Engineering career
- Discipline: Electrical Engineering
- Institutions: NASA
- Projects: Gemini; Apollo; Skylab
- Awards: National Medal of Science (1970)

George Edwin Mueller (/ˈmɪlər/; July 16, 1918 – October 12, 2015), was an American electrical engineer who was an associate administrator at NASA, heading the Office of Manned Space Flight from September 1963 until December 1969. Hailed as one of NASA's "most brilliant and fearless managers", he was instrumental in introducing the all-up testing philosophy for the Saturn V launch vehicle, which ensured the success of the Apollo program in landing a man on the Moon and returning him safely to the Earth by the end of 1969. Mueller also played a key part in the design of Skylab, and championed the Space Shuttle's development, which earned him the nickname, "the father of the Space Shuttle."

Mueller was chairman and chief vehicle architect of the now defunct Kistler Aerospace Corp.

== Early life and education ==
George Mueller was born in St. Louis, Missouri, on July 16, 1918, to parents of German descent. His mother, Ella Florence Bosch, a high school graduate, was from Belleville, Illinois, and had been a secretary, but she never worked after marriage. His father, Edwin Mueller, was an electrician who began working as a boy and never went to high school, but later became superintendent of an electrical motor repair shop in St. Louis. Both parents were English speakers, but also spoke German; Mueller never learned German well enough to converse. He went to Benton School in St. Louis until the 8th grade, when he and his parents moved to a larger house in the country called Bel Nor, and later graduated from Normandy High School.

The young Mueller enjoyed reading science fiction and, helped by his grandfather, woodworking. When he was aged 11 or 12 Mueller also built and raced model aircraft – such as gliders and rubber band model airplanes. Always curious about how things worked, he also built radios, following in the footsteps of his father. Interested in these activities, the teenage Mueller wanted to be an aeronautical engineer but discovered that where he could afford to go to school, the Missouri School of Mines and Metallurgy (now Missouri University of Science and Technology) in Rolla, Missouri, there was no aeronautical engineering department. They did offer mechanical engineering, so he enrolled in that program but found it discouraging and switched to electrical engineering.

Mueller assumed he would end up working in industry and so, in his senior year, went on a tour of various suitable companies. He applied to RCA, General Electric and Emerson but when he graduated in 1939 the economy took another downturn and he, like most of the class, had no job.

After applying to several graduate schools, he got an offer of a television fellowship (funded by RCA) at Purdue University. The fellowship led to his working on an early television project. Purdue was building a television transmitter for the campus, and it was the first of the kind that was using all vacuum tubes to produce the pictures. It was also the first using a cathode ray tube for display purposes. They still had mechanical disks for scanning but were trying to develop an all-electronic approach.

== Bell Labs ==
Near graduation, he applied for a research job at Bell Labs, which he received. After a year to establish himself there, he married Maude Rosenbaum, whom he had met in St. Louis and dated while at Purdue. The work Mueller did at Bell Labs deferred him from being drafted into the military during World War II. He initially researched orthicon technology, but, as Bell Labs geared up for war, it later became heavily involved in airborne radar technology. As the war progressed, his group was given the task of building the first airborne radar for Bell. Ultimately, the radar designed by MIT was chosen over the Bell Labs system, but not until after Mueller became spectacularly sick while flight testing Bell Labs' radar on a visit to Wright Airfield in Ohio. He continued his work on magnetrons and said he came close to co-inventing the transistor. If he and his co-workers had placed their contacts on a single crystal of zircon rather than working with multiple crystals, they would have beaten Shockley's team, also at Bell Labs.

== PhD and Ramo-Wooldridge ==
Mueller increasingly believed that to move up in the hierarchy of the Labs he would need a PhD, and he began working towards this goal on a part-time basis at Princeton University, getting up every morning at around 5 o'clock and driving to Princeton to take a couple of courses before driving back down to Holmdel to work all day at Bell Labs. In 1946 a colleague at the Labs: Milton Boone - a professor from Ohio State University on leave at Bell Labs during the war, encouraged Mueller to help set up a vacuum tube lab and run the communications group at Ohio State.

Moving to Columbus, Mueller taught electrical engineering and the new field of system engineering, and continued his research, focusing his PhD thesis on dielectric antennas. Upon obtaining his doctorate in physics in 1951, he became associate professor of electrical engineering. Ramo-Wooldridge Corporation, later part of TRW, recruited him and he took a one-year sabbatical in 1953. A consultant to Ramo-Wooldridge, Mueller got involved in the review of radar designs and the Bell Labs radar for the Titan rocket (which was originally radio-guided). Mueller was peripherally involved with some of the developments of the inertial systems and generally began to help out wherever there was a problem. Mueller admitted in 1987 that at this time he did not know anything about missiles.

After returning from his sabbatical year to Ohio State, Mueller taught but was also retained as a part-time consultant to R-W. In 1957 he joined Ramo-Wooldridge full-time as director of the Electronics Laboratories. This Laboratory soon merged with the mechanical group, and then Mueller became deputy leader of this larger research and development organization. He was also program director for the Pioneer program and later took over as head of R&D [Research and Development]. The Thompson Products Company bought R-W and merged it into what became TRW. While working on missile systems Mueller became convinced that all-up testing was essential as "you don't want to be testing piece-wise in space. You want to test the entire system because who knows which one's going to fail, and you'd better have it all together so that whatever fails, you have a reasonable chance of finding the real failure mode, not just the one you were looking for."

== NASA and the Apollo program ==
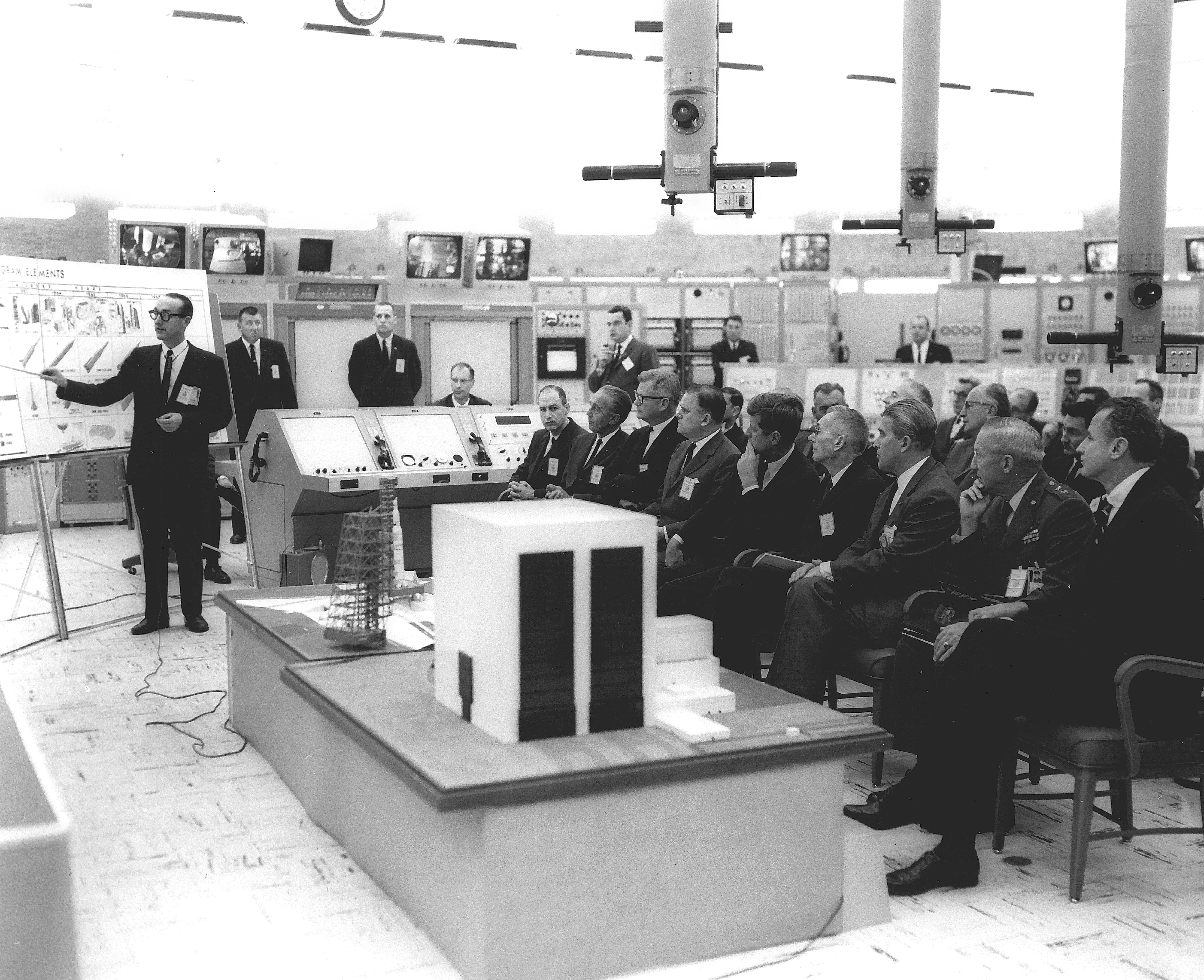
George Mueller gives a briefing to Kennedy six days before his assassination.

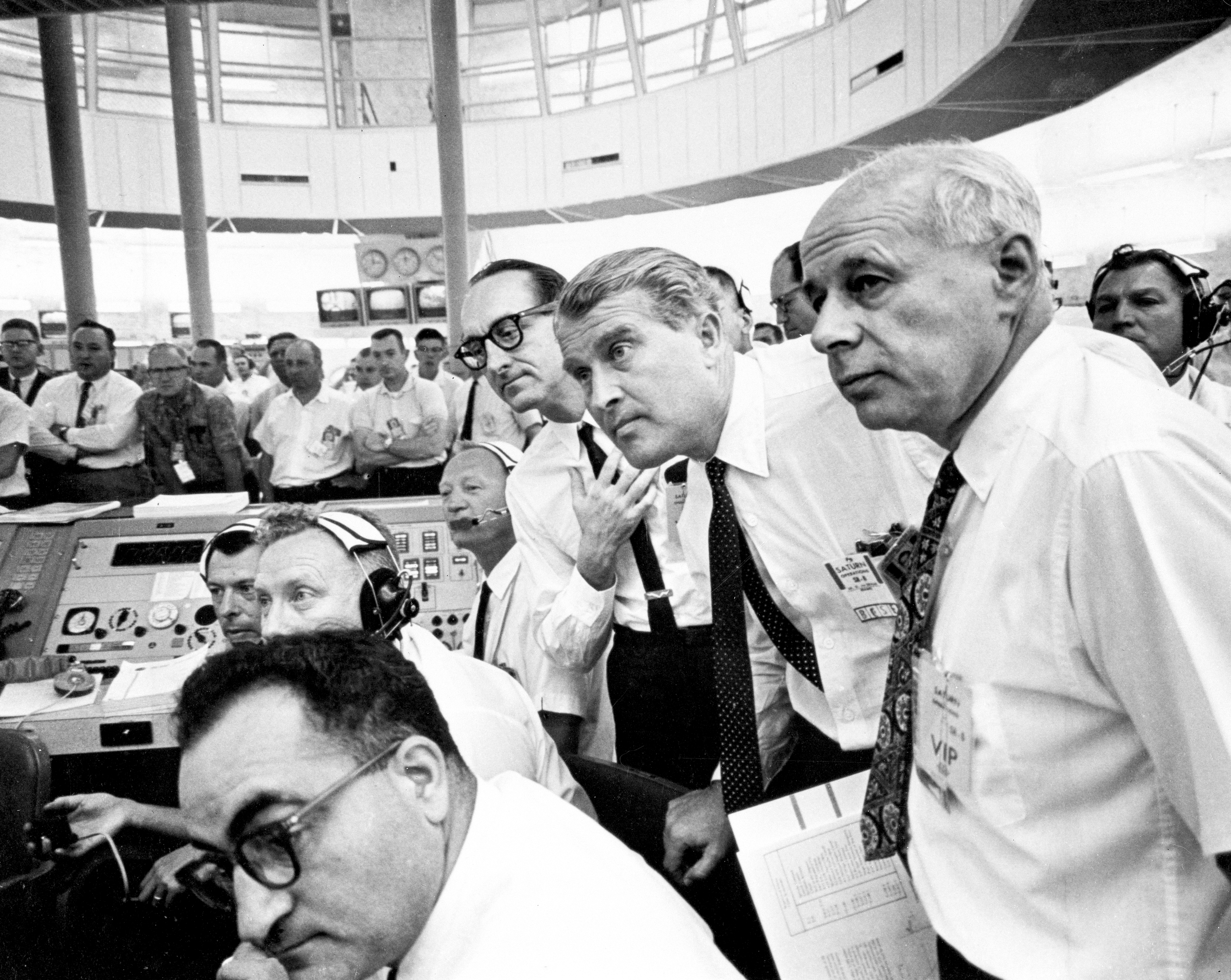
A tense moment during the AS-101 launch. Standing, from left to right are George Mueller, Wernher von Braun, and Eberhard Rees (Director for Research and Development at MSFC).

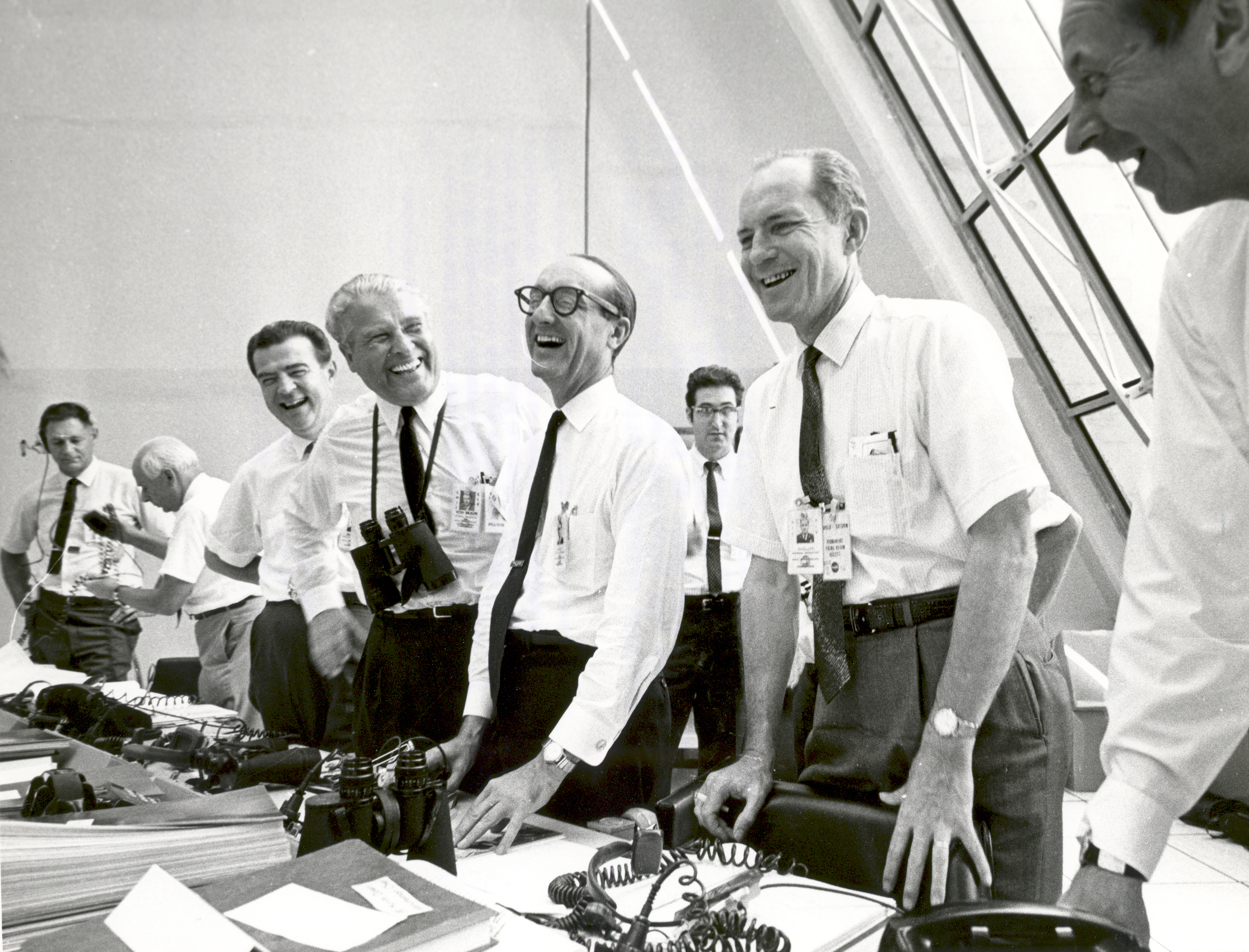
Charles W. Mathews (Deputy Associate Administrator, Office of Manned Space Flight), Wernher von Braun (Director, Marshall Space Flight Center), George Mueller, and Lt. Gen. Samuel C. Phillips (Director, Apollo Program) after the Apollo 11 liftoff.

Mueller became increasingly involved with NASA and the Apollo Program. NASA's Administrator James E. Webb sounded Mueller out for a top job. Mueller would only agree if the agency was restructured, and so during the fall of 1963 Webb worked with Associate Administrator Robert Seamans to restructure NASA, shifting three key centers (Manned Spacecraft Center (MSC), Marshall Space Flight Center (MSFC), and the Launch Operations Center (LOC)) to report directly to Mueller, as well as a local staff at Headquarters. Mueller accepted the job, and took a substantial pay cut. The reorganization of NASA and the Office of Manned Space Flight (OMSF) was announced in November 1963.

Encouraged by Webb, Mueller had studied the three centers, speaking with people he knew from his work at Ramo-Wooldridge. His impression: "there wasn't any management system in existence". More seriously, Mueller found no means to determine and control hardware configurations, which gave no way to determine costs or schedules. Mueller concluded he would have to "teach people what was involved in doing program control."

In August 1963, Mueller invited each of his three field center directors to visit him and explained how his proposed changes would put Apollo back on schedule and solve problems with the Bureau of the Budget. Change did not come easy and he had some problems with Wernher von Braun who gave "one of his impassioned speeches about how you can't change the basic organization of Marshall." After some argument, von Braun accepted Mueller's proposals and reorganized MSFC, strengthening its capacity in running large projects.

Mueller's position was strengthened by directors at MSC, MSFC and LOC reporting directly to OMSF. Mueller also reduced attendance at the Manned Space Flight Management Council to just himself and the Center directors. Borrowing from the US Air Force Minuteman program, Mueller formed the Apollo Executive Group, which consisted of himself and the presidents of Apollo's main contractors.

The biggest problem Mueller still faced was Apollo's slipping schedule and huge cost overruns. He had always thought the only way to resolve this, and achieve a lunar landing before 1970, was to reduce the number of test flights. Mueller wanted to use his "all-up testing" concept with each flight using the full number of live stages. This approach had been used successfully on the Titan II and Minuteman programs but violated von Braun's engineering concepts. The von Braun test plan called for the first live test to use the Saturn's first stage with dummy upper stages. If the first stage worked correctly then the first two stages would be live with a dummy third stage and so on, with at least ten test flights before a crewed version was put into low Earth orbit.

The Saturn V program manager Arthur Rudolph cornered Mueller with scale models of Saturn and Minuteman. The Saturn dwarfed the Minuteman but Mueller replied, "So what?"

Eventually von Braun and the others were won over. As von Braun stated: "It sounded reckless, but George Mueller's reasoning was impeccable. Water ballast in lieu of a second and third stage would require much less tank volume than liquid-hydrogen-fuelled stages, so that a rocket tested with only a live first stage would be much shorter than the final configuration. Its aerodynamic shape and its body dynamics would thus not be representative. Filling the ballast tanks with liquid hydrogen? Fine, but then why not burn it as a bonus experiment? And so the arguments went on until George in the end prevailed."

Mueller's concept of all-up testing worked. The first two uncrewed flights of the Saturn V were successful (the second less so), then the third Saturn V put Frank Borman's Apollo 8 crew in orbit round the Moon on Christmas 1968, and the sixth Saturn V carried Neil Armstrong's Apollo 11 to the first lunar landing.

In an interview Mueller acknowledged what would have happened if all-up testing had failed, "The whole Apollo program and my reputation would have gone down the drain".

With this battle won, in November 1965, Mueller reorganized the Gemini and Apollo Program Offices, creating a five-box structure at HQ and field center. This structure replicated Mueller's concept of system management and provided far better program overview. The key part of the idea was that inside these "GEM boxes" (named from his initials), managers and engineers communicated directly with their functional counterparts in NASA HQ, bypassing the usual chain of command and bureaucracy.

Mueller's reorganization of the Apollo program and Marshall Space Flight Center, integrated through the Saturn V development program

With another battle won, Mueller still found that he could not always find the right people with the right skills. Using his background with Air Force projects, Mueller sought Webb's permission to bring in skilled Air Force program managers. He proposed Minuteman program director Colonel Samuel C. Phillips as Apollo program director in OMSF. Webb agreed, and so did AFSC chief General Bernard Schriever. Phillips in turn agreed and brought with him 42 mid-grade officers and eventually 124 more junior officers. Ultimately, over 400 experienced military officers worked on Apollo and other NASA programs during the 1960s.

Seamans (promoted in 1965 to deputy administrator) stated that Mueller "didn't sell; he dictated – and without his direction, Apollo would not have succeeded."

Also well known were Mueller's Project Status Reviews, often held on Sundays and in brutal detail. The presentations were nicknamed "pasteurized" as the tired managers' ability to absorb the detail was waning, and the charts were merely "past your eyes."

After the Apollo 1 fire, NASA Administrator James Webb became distrustful of Mueller, but commented. "Even if I wanted to, I couldn't fire him because he was manager of our successful Apollo project, and one of the ablest men in the world ... The last thing I wanted was to lose him, but I also had another desire, which was not to let his way of working create too many difficulties."

== Apollo applications and Skylab ==
Even while Apollo was progressing Mueller and others were pushing for an aggressive post-Apollo program. He established the Apollo Applications Office in 1965. The Applications were extensive, involving a crewed lunar base, an Earth-orbiting space station, Apollo telescope, a Grand Tour of the Outer Solar System, and the original "Voyager program" of Mars Lander probes. Faced with Congressional disapproval and infighting within NASA, the ambitious Apollo Applications Program was cut back time and time again, until just Skylab remained.

== "Father of the Space Shuttle" ==
Mueller is often credited as being the "Father of the Space Shuttle". Whether this is entirely true is debatable – Scott Pace propounded the view that, in such a complex system with so many stakeholders, "everyone was a Shuttle designer." What is beyond doubt is that Mueller played a key role in early Space Shuttle decisions and in championing the cause for a reusable space vehicle. While perhaps not the 'Father' he has been accurately described by Professor John Logsdon as the 'Policy Father of the Space Shuttle'.

Mueller held a one-day symposium (held at NASA headquarters) in December 1967 to which 80 people from the Air Force, NASA and industry were invited to discuss low cost space flight and shuttle-like designs. The designs ranged from 'simple' concepts like Martin Marietta's six person reusable craft similar to the Dyna-Soar (launched by a Titan III-M), to partially reusable concepts like Lockheed's Star Clipper or Tip Tank from McDonnell Douglas, to fully reusable two-stage vehicles like the one proposed by General Dynamics.

Following this symposium Mueller continued to champion a "space shuttle". He did not invent the term, but he made it his own. He was also a keen proponent of space stations and was well aware that the Space Shuttle was to shuttle to and from such a station.

While in London in August 1968, to receive an award from the British Interplanetary Society, he again trumpeted the cause of the shuttle, "... there is a real requirement for an efficient earth to orbit transportation system – an economical space shuttle". "I forecast that the next major thrust in space will be the development of an economical launch vehicle for shuttling between Earth and the installations, such as the orbiting space station that will soon be orbiting in space." He also stated, as many others would do later, that "The shuttle ideally would be able to operate in a mode similar to that of a large commercial air transports and be compatible with the environment of major airports".

Mueller's optimism grew in 1968 and he chided Wernher von Braun (who had been cautiously promoting a cheap interim shuttle-type craft), "You'd be telling me that my Shuttle was in the future and you needed an interim system." Mueller was sure that the incoming president, Richard Nixon, would want to go "all out" and that "this may be the big program for Nixon".

In 1987 Mueller had this to say about the shuttle, "It was clear to us at that time that we needed to have a joint program between the Air Force and NASA, and that that program ought to be aimed at providing low cost space transportation for all of our needs. It's just in my view unfortunate that we made the compromise, after I left NASA, in terms of a partially reusable vehicle, and all that that implies in terms of not only the cost of the throw-away parts but also the cost of the ground troops that have to process it and put it together and fly it every time. That combination—and ground support is a not insignificant part of a Shuttle cost—was a set of decisions that doomed low cost space transportation for that generation of vehicles."

== Mueller's working style ==
Almost everyone who worked with Mueller on Apollo agreed he was technically brilliant and exceedingly capable. Even those who frequently disagreed with him like Christopher Kraft or George Low recognized his abilities. While Mueller could be described as intellectually arrogant he was not an office tyrant; one of his colleagues, John Disher, describes working for him as a "piece of cake". Nor did he try to belittle others or shout them down. While appearing affable and reasonably charming "with the epitome of politeness, but you know down deep he's just as hard as steel!".

== Resignation from NASA ==
Mueller resigned from NASA on November 10, 1969, effective from December 10. Rumors had been circulating for a while that he wanted to return to private industry. The New York Times stated that 'informed sources' "alleged clashes with (Administrator) Thomas Paine over space priorities for '70s and disputes with subordinates; he has twice been passed over for deputy admr post".

In an interview Mueller gave different reasons for leaving, "One is that the decision had been made to terminate the Apollo program, and that was a good time then to leave before, and let someone else take over for the next phase. From a practical point of view, I needed to go make some money so I could keep my family going. It was costly for us to join the Apollo program. My salary was half what I was making in industry when I went there, and it was just a strain to keep the family going and work going at the same time. So I went back to industry."

After a short time at General Dynamics, Mueller became chairman and president of the System Development Corporation, a spin-off from the RAND Corporation, in 1971. He remained with SDC following the Burroughs Corporation's acquisition of the company, and retired after growing the company successfully in 1984. While at SDC, Mueller married his second wife, Darla. After a short retirement, Mueller became the president of the International Academy of Astronautics, in addition to consulting and other volunteer work. Yearning to return to full-time employment, he became the CEO of Kistler Aerospace in 1996 and remained with the company for a number of years.

== Post NASA career ==
- Senior vice president of General Dynamics Corporation, Falls Church, Virginia (1969–1971)
- System Development Corporation, Santa Monica, California
  - Chairman, president (1971–1980)
  - Chairman, chief executive officer (1981–1983)
- Burroughs Corporation
  - Senior vice-president (1982–1983)
  - Consultant (1984 – date unknown)
- Kistler Aerospace (Rocketplane Kistler from 2006)
  - CEO 1995–2004
  - Chairman and chief vehicle architect 2004

Mueller died of congestive heart failure in Irvine, California, on October 12, 2015, at the age of 97.

== Awards and honors ==
- 1970, National Medal of Science
- 1972, Golden Plate Award of the American Academy of Achievement
