= Cosworth engine customers' Grand Prix results =

The table below details the Grand Prix results of the other teams for which Cosworth was an engine supplier.

== Formula One World Championship results ==
=== One-off entries (1963–1966) ===
(key)

Year	Entrant	Chassis	Engine	Tyres	Drivers	1	2	3	4	5	6	7	8	9	10	Points	WCC
1963	Canadian Stebro Racing	Stebro Mk IV	109E 1.5 L4	D		MON	BEL	NED	FRA	GBR	GER	ITA	USA	MEX	RSA	0	NC
1963	Canadian Stebro Racing	Stebro Mk IV	109E 1.5 L4	D	Peter Broeker								7			0	NC
1963	Ted Lanfear	Lotus 22	109E 1.5 L4	D	Brausch Niemann										14	0	NC
1963	David Prophet	Brabham BT6	109E 1.5 L4	D	David Prophet										Ret	0	NC
1964	Bob Gerard Racing	Cooper T71/T73	109E 1.5 L4	D		MON	NED	BEL	FRA	GBR	GER	AUT	ITA	USA	MEX	0	NC
1964	Bob Gerard Racing	Cooper T71/T73	109E 1.5 L4	D	John Taylor					14						0	NC
1964	John Willment Automobiles	Brabham BT10	109E 1.5 L4	D	Frank Gardner					Ret						0	NC
1965	John Willment Automobiles	Brabham BT10	109E 1.5 L4	D		RSA	MON	BEL	FRA	GBR	NED	GER	ITA	USA	MEX	0	NC
1965	John Willment Automobiles	Brabham BT10	109E 1.5 L4	D	Paul Hawkins	9										0	NC
1965	David Prophet Racing	Brabham BT10	109E 1.5 L4	D	David Prophet	14										0	NC
1965	Ted Lanfear	Lotus 22	109E 1.5 L4	D	Brausch Niemann	DNQ										0	NC
1965	Brian Raubenheimer	Lotus 20	109E 1.5 L4	D	Brian Raubenheimer	WD										0	NC
1965	Ecurie Tomahawk	Lotus 20	109E 1.5 L4	D	Dave Charlton	DNPQ										0	NC
1965	Trevor Blokdyk	Cooper T59	109E 1.5 L4	D	Trevor Blokdyk	DNQ										0	NC
1965	Bob Gerard Racing	Cooper T73	109E 1.5 L4	D	Alan Rollinson					DNQ						0	NC
1966	Caltex Racing Team	Brabham BT18	Cosworth SCA 1.0 L4	D		MON	BEL	FRA	GBR	NED	GER	ITA	USA	MEX		—N/a	
1966	Caltex Racing Team	Brabham BT18	Cosworth SCA 1.0 L4	D	Kurt Ahrens Jr.						Ret					—N/a	
1966	Roy Winkelmann Racing	Brabham BT18	Cosworth SCA 1.0 L4	D	Hans Herrmann						11					—N/a	
1966	Roy Winkelmann Racing	Brabham BT18	Cosworth SCA 1.0 L4	D	Alan Rees						Ret					—N/a	
1966	Team Lotus	Lotus 44	Cosworth SCA 1.0 L4	D	Pedro Rodríguez						Ret					—N/a	
1966	Team Lotus	Lotus 44	Cosworth SCA 1.0 L4	D	Piers Courage						Ret					—N/a	
1966	Team Lotus	Lotus 44	Cosworth SCA 1.0 L4	D	Gerhard Mitter						DNS					—N/a	
1966	Matra Sports	Matra MS5	Cosworth SCA 1.0 L4	D	Jean-Pierre Beltoise						8					—N/a	
1966	Matra Sports	Matra MS5	Cosworth SCA 1.0 L4	D	Jo Schlesser						10					—N/a	
1966	Tyrrell Racing	Matra MS5	Cosworth SCA 1.0 L4	D	Jacky Ickx						Ret					—N/a	
1966	Silvio Moser	Brabham BT16	Cosworth SCA 1.0 L4	D	Silvio Moser						DNS					—N/a	

=== 1967 ===
(key)

Year	Entrant	Chassis	Engine	Tyres	Drivers	1	2	3	4	5	6	7	8	9	10	11	Points	WCC
1967	Team Lotus	Lotus 49	Cosworth DFV 3.0 V8	F		RSA	MON	NED	BEL	FRA	GBR	GER	CAN	ITA	USA	MEX	44	2nd
1967	Team Lotus	Lotus 49	Cosworth DFV 3.0 V8	F	Jim Clark			1^{F}	6^{P}	Ret	1^{P}	Ret^{P}	Ret^{P}^{F}	3^{P}^{F}	1	1^{P}^{F}	44	2nd
1967	Team Lotus	Lotus 49	Cosworth DFV 3.0 V8	F	Graham Hill			Ret^{P}	Ret	Ret^{P}^{F}	Ret	Ret	4	Ret	2^{P}^{F}	Ret	44	2nd
1967	Team Lotus	Lotus 49	Cosworth DFV 3.0 V8	F	Eppie Wietzes								DSQ				44	2nd
1967	Team Lotus	Lotus 49	Cosworth DFV 3.0 V8	F	Giancarlo Baghetti									Ret			44	2nd
1967	Team Lotus	Lotus 49	Cosworth DFV 3.0 V8	F	Moisés Solana										Ret	Ret	44	2nd
1967	Team Lotus	Lotus 48	Cosworth FVA 1.6 L4	F	Jackie Oliver							5					44	2nd
1967	Matra Sports	Matra MS7	Cosworth FVA 1.6 L4	D	Jean-Pierre Beltoise		DNQ			DNA					7	7	0	NC
1967	Matra Sports	Matra MS7	Cosworth FVA 1.6 L4	D	Johnny Servoz-Gavin		Ret			DNA							0	NC
1967	Tyrrell Racing	Matra MS7	Cosworth FVA 1.6 L4	D	Jacky Ickx							Ret					0	NC
1967	Ecurie Ford-France	Matra MS5	Cosworth FVA 1.6 L4	D	Jo Schlesser							Ret					0	NC
1967	Roy Winkelmann Racing	Brabham BT23	Cosworth FVA 1.6 L4	D	Alan Rees							7					—N/a	
1967	Gerhard Mitter	Brabham BT23	Cosworth FVA 1.6 L4	D	Gerhard Mitter							Ret					—N/a	
1967	Ron Harris Racing Team	Protos F2	Cosworth FVA 1.6 L4	F	Brian Hart							NC					—N/a	
1967	Ron Harris Racing Team	Protos F2	Cosworth FVA 1.6 L4	F	Kurt Ahrens Jr.							Ret					—N/a	
1967	Lola Cars	Lola T100	Cosworth FVA 1.6 L4	F	Brian Redman							DNS					—N/a	

=== 1968 ===
(key)

Year	Entrant	Chassis	Engine	Tyres	Drivers	1	2	3	4	5	6	7	8	9	10	11	12	Points	WCC
1968	Team Lotus	Lotus 49	Ford Cosworth DFV 3.0 V8	F		RSA	ESP	MON	BEL	NED	FRA	GBR	GER	ITA	CAN	USA	MEX	62	1st
1968	Team Lotus	Lotus 49	Ford Cosworth DFV 3.0 V8	F	Jim Clark	1^{P}^{F}												62	1st
1968	Team Lotus	Lotus 49	Ford Cosworth DFV 3.0 V8	F	Graham Hill	2												62	1st
1968	Gold Leaf Team Lotus	Lotus 49 49B	Ford Cosworth DFV 3.0 V8	F	Graham Hill		1	1^{P}	Ret	9	Ret	Ret^{P}	2	Ret	4	2	1	62	1st
1968	Gold Leaf Team Lotus	Lotus 49 49B	Ford Cosworth DFV 3.0 V8	F	Jackie Oliver			Ret	5	NC		Ret	11	Ret^{F}	Ret	DNS	3	62	1st
1968	Gold Leaf Team Lotus	Lotus 49 49B	Ford Cosworth DFV 3.0 V8	F	Mario Andretti									DNS		Ret^{P}		62	1st
1968	Gold Leaf Team Lotus	Lotus 49 49B	Ford Cosworth DFV 3.0 V8	F	Bill Brack										Ret			62	1st
1968	Gold Leaf Team Lotus	Lotus 49 49B	Ford Cosworth DFV 3.0 V8	F	Moisés Solana												Ret	62	1st
1968	Rob Walker Racing Team	Lotus 49 49B	Ford Cosworth DFV 3.0 V8	F	Jo Siffert		Ret	Ret	7	Ret	11	1^{F}	Ret	Ret	Ret^{F}	5	6^{P}^{F}	62	1st
1968	Bruce McLaren Motor Racing	McLaren M7A	Ford Cosworth DFV 3.0 V8	G	Bruce McLaren		Ret	Ret	1	Ret	8	7	13	Ret	2	6	2	49	2nd
1968	Bruce McLaren Motor Racing	McLaren M7A	Ford Cosworth DFV 3.0 V8	G	Denny Hulme		2	5	Ret	Ret	5	4	7	1	1	Ret	Ret	49	2nd
1968	Anglo American Racers	McLaren M7A	Ford Cosworth DFV 3.0 V8	G	Dan Gurney										Ret	4	Ret	49	2nd
1968	Matra International (Tyrrell Racing)	Matra MS9 MS10	Ford Cosworth DFV 3.0 V8	D	Jackie Stewart	Ret			4	1	3	6	1^{F}	Ret	6	1^{F}	7	45	3rd
1968	Matra International (Tyrrell Racing)	Matra MS9 MS10	Ford Cosworth DFV 3.0 V8	D	Johnny Servoz-Gavin			Ret						2	Ret		Ret	45	3rd
1968	Matra International (Tyrrell Racing)	Matra MS9 MS10	Ford Cosworth DFV 3.0 V8	D	Jean-Pierre Beltoise		5^{F}											45	3rd
1968	Matra Sports	Matra MS7	Cosworth FVA 1.6 L4	D	Jean-Pierre Beltoise	6												45	3rd

=== 1969 ===
(key)

Year	Entrant	Chassis	Engine	Tyres	Drivers	1	2	3	4	5	6	7	8	9	10	11	Points	WCC
1969	Matra Sports	Matra MS7	Cosworth FVA 1.6 L4	D		RSA	ESP	MON	NED	FRA	GBR	GER	ITA	CAN	USA	MEX	66	1st
1969	Matra Sports	Matra MS7	Cosworth FVA 1.6 L4	D	Henri Pescarolo							5					66	1st
1969	Matra Sports	Matra MS7	Cosworth FVA 1.6 L4	D	Johnny Servoz-Gavin							Ret					66	1st
1969	Matra International (Tyrrell Racing)	Matra MS10 MS80 MS84	Ford Cosworth DFV 3.0 V8	D	Johnny Servoz-Gavin									6	NC	8	66	1st
1969	Matra International (Tyrrell Racing)	Matra MS10 MS80 MS84	Ford Cosworth DFV 3.0 V8	D	Jackie Stewart	1^{F}	1	Ret^{P}^{F}	1^{F}	1^{P}^{F}	1^{F}	2	1	Ret	Ret	4	66	1st
1969	Matra International (Tyrrell Racing)	Matra MS10 MS80 MS84	Ford Cosworth DFV 3.0 V8	D	Jean-Pierre Beltoise	6	3	Ret	8	2	9	12†	3^{F}	4	Ret	5	66	1st
1969	Motor Racing Developments Ltd	Brabham BT26A	Ford Cosworth DFV 3.0 V8	G	Jack Brabham	Ret^{P}	Ret	Ret	6				Ret	2^{F}	4	3^{P}	49 (51)	2nd
1969	Motor Racing Developments Ltd	Brabham BT26A	Ford Cosworth DFV 3.0 V8	G	Jacky Ickx	Ret	6	Ret	5	3	2	1^{P}^{F}	10	1^{P}^{F}	Ret	2^{F}	49 (51)	2nd
1969	Frank Williams Racing Cars	Brabham BT26A	Ford Cosworth DFV 3.0 V8	D	Piers Courage		Ret	2	Ret	Ret	5	Ret	5	Ret	2	10	49 (51)	2nd
1969	Frank Williams Racing Cars	Brabham BT30	Cosworth FVA 1.6 L4	D	Richard Attwood							6					49 (51)	2nd
1969	Ahrens Racing Team	Brabham BT30	Cosworth FVA 1.6 L4	D	Kurt Ahrens Jr.							7					49 (51)	2nd
1969	Felday Engineering Ltd	Brabham BT30	Cosworth FVA 1.6 L4	F	Peter Westbury							9					49 (51)	2nd
1969	Squadra Tartaruga	Brabham BT23C	Cosworth FVA 1.6 L4	F	Xavier Perrot							10					49 (51)	2nd
1969	Silvio Moser Racing Team	Brabham BT24	Ford Cosworth DFV 3.0 V8	G	Silvio Moser			Ret	Ret	7			Ret	Ret	6	11	49 (51)	2nd
1969	Gold Leaf Team Lotus	Lotus 49B 63	Ford Cosworth DFV 3.0 V8	F	Graham Hill	2	Ret	1	7	6	7	4	9	Ret	Ret		47	3rd
1969	Gold Leaf Team Lotus	Lotus 49B 63	Ford Cosworth DFV 3.0 V8	F	Jochen Rindt	Ret	Ret^{P}^{F}		Ret^{P}	Ret	4^{P}	Ret	2^{P}	3	1^{P}^{F}	Ret	47	3rd
1969	Gold Leaf Team Lotus	Lotus 49B 63	Ford Cosworth DFV 3.0 V8	F	Mario Andretti	Ret						Ret			Ret		47	3rd
1969	Gold Leaf Team Lotus	Lotus 49B 63	Ford Cosworth DFV 3.0 V8	F	Richard Attwood			4									47	3rd
1969	Gold Leaf Team Lotus	Lotus 49B 63	Ford Cosworth DFV 3.0 V8	F	John Miles					Ret	10		Ret	Ret		Ret	47	3rd
1969	Rob Walker Racing Team	Lotus 49B	Ford Cosworth DFV 3.0 V8	F	Jo Siffert	4	Ret	3	2	9	8	11†	8	Ret	Ret	Ret	47	3rd
1969	Team Gunston	Lotus 49	Ford Cosworth DFV 3.0 V8	D	John Love	Ret											47	3rd
1969	Ecurie Bonnier	Lotus 49B 63	Ford Cosworth DFV 3.0 V8	F	Jo Bonnier						Ret	Ret					47	3rd
1969	Roy Winkelmann Racing	Lotus 59B	Cosworth FVA 1.6 L4	F	Rolf Stommelen							8					47	3rd
1969	Roy Winkelmann Racing	Lotus 59B	Cosworth FVA 1.6 L4	F	Hans Herrmann							DNS					47	3rd
1969	Pete Lovely Volkswagen Inc.	Lotus 49B	Ford Cosworth DFV 3.0 V8	F	Pete Lovely										Ret	9	47	3rd
1969	Bruce McLaren Motor Racing	McLaren M7A M7C M9A	Ford Cosworth DFV 3.0 V8	G	Denny Hulme	3	4	6	4	8	Ret	Ret	7	Ret	Ret	1	38 (40)	4th
1969	Bruce McLaren Motor Racing	McLaren M7A M7C M9A	Ford Cosworth DFV 3.0 V8	G	Bruce McLaren	5	2	5	Ret	4	3	3	4	5	DNS	DNS	38 (40)	4th
1969	Bruce McLaren Motor Racing	McLaren M7A M7C M9A	Ford Cosworth DFV 3.0 V8	G	Derek Bell						Ret						38 (40)	4th
1969	Team Lawson	McLaren M7A	Ford Cosworth DFV 3.0 V8	D	Basil van Rooyen	Ret											38 (40)	4th
1969	Antique Automobiles	McLaren M7B	Ford Cosworth DFV 3.0 V8	G	Vic Elford				10	5	6	Ret					38 (40)	4th
1969	Tecno Racing Team	Tecno 69	Cosworth FVA 1.6 L4	D	François Cevert							Ret					—N/a	

=== 1970 ===
(key)

Year	Entrant	Chassis	Engine	Tyres	Drivers	1	2	3	4	5	6	7	8	9	10	11	12	13	Points	WCC
1970	Gold Leaf Team Lotus	Lotus 49 72 72C	Ford Cosworth DFV 3.0 V8	F		RSA	ESP	MON	BEL	NED	FRA	GBR	GER	AUT	ITA	CAN	USA	MEX	59*	1st
1970	Gold Leaf Team Lotus	Lotus 49 72 72C	Ford Cosworth DFV 3.0 V8	F	Jochen Rindt	13	Ret	1^{F}	Ret	1^{P}	1	1^{P}	1	Ret^{P}	DNS				59*	1st
1970	Gold Leaf Team Lotus	Lotus 49 72 72C	Ford Cosworth DFV 3.0 V8	F	John Miles	5	DNQ	DNQ	Ret	7	8	Ret	Ret	Ret	DNS				59*	1st
1970	Gold Leaf Team Lotus	Lotus 49 72 72C	Ford Cosworth DFV 3.0 V8	F	Emerson Fittipaldi							8	4	15	DNS		1	Ret	59*	1st
1970	Gold Leaf Team Lotus	Lotus 49 72 72C	Ford Cosworth DFV 3.0 V8	F	Reine Wisell												3	NC	59*	1st
1970	Brooke Bond Oxo Racing	Lotus 49C 72	Ford Cosworth DFV 3.0 V8	F	Graham Hill	6	4	5	Ret	NC	10	6	Ret		DNS	NC	Ret	Ret	59*	1st
1970	Brooke Bond Oxo Racing	Lotus 49C 72	Ford Cosworth DFV 3.0 V8	F	Brian Redman	DNS													59*	1st
1970	Team Gunston	Lotus 49	Ford Cosworth DFV 3.0 V8	D	John Love	8													59*	1st
1970	Scuderia Scribante	Lotus 49C	Ford Cosworth DFV 3.0 V8	F	Dave Charlton	12													59*	1st
1970	World Wide Racing	Lotus 49C 72	Ford Cosworth DFV 3.0 V8	F	Alex Soler-Roig		DNQ		DNS		DNQ								59*	1st
1970	Pete Lovely Volkswagen Inc.	Lotus 49B	Ford Cosworth DFV 3.0 V8	F	Pete Lovely					DNQ	DNQ	NC					DNQ		59*	1st
1970	March Engineering	March 701	Ford Cosworth DFV 3.0 V8	F	Chris Amon	Ret	Ret	Ret	2^{F}	Ret	2	5	Ret	8	7	3	5	4	48	3rd
1970	March Engineering	March 701	Ford Cosworth DFV 3.0 V8	F	Jo Siffert	10	DNQ	8	7	Ret	Ret	Ret	8	9	Ret	Ret	9	Ret	48	3rd
1970	STP Corporation	March 701	Ford Cosworth DFV 3.0 V8	F	Mario Andretti	Ret	3					Ret	Ret	Ret					48	3rd
1970	Antique Automobiles	March 701	Ford Cosworth DFV 3.0 V8	G	Ronnie Peterson			7	NC										48	3rd
1970	Colin Crabbe Racing	March 701	Ford Cosworth DFV 3.0 V8	G	Ronnie Peterson					9	Ret	9	Ret		Ret	NC	11		48	3rd
1970	Hubert Hahne	March 701	Ford Cosworth DFV 3.0 V8	G	Hubert Hahne								DNQ						48	3rd
1970	Tyrrell Racing Organisation	March 701	Ford Cosworth DFV 3.0 V8	G	Johnny Servoz-Gavin	Ret	5	DNQ											48	3rd
1970	Tyrrell Racing Organisation	March 701	Ford Cosworth DFV 3.0 V8	G	François Cevert					Ret	11	7	7	Ret	6	9	Ret	Ret	48	3rd
1970	Tyrrell Racing Organisation	March 701	Ford Cosworth DFV 3.0 V8	G	Jackie Stewart	3^{P}	1	Ret^{P}	Ret^{P}	2	9	Ret	Ret	Ret	2				48	3rd
1970	Tyrrell Racing Organisation	Tyrrell 001	Ford Cosworth DFV 3.0 V8	G	Jackie Stewart											Ret^{P}	Ret	Ret	0	-
1970	Motor Racing Developments Ltd	Brabham BT33	Ford Cosworth DFV 3.0 V8	G	Jack Brabham	1^{F}	Ret^{P}^{F}	2	Ret	11	3^{F}	2^{F}	Ret	13	Ret	Ret	10	Ret	35	4th
1970	Auto Motor Und Sport	Brabham BT33	Ford Cosworth DFV 3.0 V8	G	Rolf Stommelen	Ret	Ret	DNQ	5	DNQ	7	DNS	5	3	5	Ret	12	Ret	35	4th
1970	Team Gunston	Brabham BT26A	Ford Cosworth DFV 3.0 V8	G	Peter de Klerk	11													35	4th
1970	Tom Wheatcroft Racing	Brabham BT26A	Ford Cosworth DFV 3.0 V8	G	Derek Bell				Ret										35	4th
1970	Gus Hutchison	Brabham BT26A	Ford Cosworth DFV 3.0 V8	G	Gus Hutchison												Ret		35	4th
1970	Bruce McLaren Motor Racing	McLaren M14A	Ford Cosworth DFV 3.0 V8	G	Bruce McLaren	Ret	2	Ret											35	5th
1970	Bruce McLaren Motor Racing	McLaren M14A	Ford Cosworth DFV 3.0 V8	G	Denny Hulme	2	Ret	4			4	3	3	Ret	4	Ret	7	3	35	5th
1970	Bruce McLaren Motor Racing	McLaren M14A	Ford Cosworth DFV 3.0 V8	G	Dan Gurney					Ret	6	Ret							35	5th
1970	Bruce McLaren Motor Racing	McLaren M14A	Ford Cosworth DFV 3.0 V8	G	Peter Gethin					Ret			Ret	10	Ret	6	14	Ret	35	5th
1970	Ecurie Bonnier	McLaren M7C	Ford Cosworth DFV 3.0 V8	G	Jo Bonnier										DNQ		Ret		35	5th
1970	Team Surtees	McLaren M7C	Ford Cosworth DFV 3.0 V8	F	John Surtees	Ret	Ret	Ret		6									35	5th
1970	Team Surtees	Surtees TS7	Ford Cosworth DFV 3.0 V8	F	John Surtees							Ret	9	Ret	Ret	5	Ret	8	3	8th
1970	Team Surtees	Surtees TS7	Ford Cosworth DFV 3.0 V8	F	Derek Bell												6		3	8th
1970	Frank Williams Racing Cars	De Tomaso 505/38	Ford Cosworth DFV 3.0 V8	D	Piers Courage	Ret	DNS	NC	Ret	Ret									0	-
1970	Frank Williams Racing Cars	De Tomaso 505/38	Ford Cosworth DFV 3.0 V8	D	Brian Redman							DNS	DNQ						0	-
1970	Frank Williams Racing Cars	De Tomaso 505/38	Ford Cosworth DFV 3.0 V8	D	Tim Schenken									Ret	Ret	NC	Ret		0	-
1970	Silvio Moser Racing Team	Bellasi F1	Ford Cosworth DFV 3.0 V8	G	Silvio Moser					DNQ	DNQ		DNQ	Ret	DNQ				0	-

=== 1971 ===
(key)

Year	Entrant	Chassis	Engine	Tyres	Drivers	1	2	3	4	5	6	7	8	9	10	11	Points	WCC
1971	Elf Team Tyrrell	Tyrrell 001 002 003	Ford Cosworth DFV 3.0 V8	G		RSA	ESP	MON	NED	FRA	GBR	GER	AUT	ITA	CAN	USA	73	1st
1971	Elf Team Tyrrell	Tyrrell 001 002 003	Ford Cosworth DFV 3.0 V8	G	Jackie Stewart	2^{P}	1	1^{P}^{F}	11	1^{P}^{F}	1^{F}	1^{P}	Ret	Ret	1^{P}	5^{P}	73	1st
1971	Elf Team Tyrrell	Tyrrell 001 002 003	Ford Cosworth DFV 3.0 V8	G	François Cevert	Ret	7	Ret	Ret	2	10	2^{F}	Ret	3	6	1	73	1st
1971	Elf Team Tyrrell	Tyrrell 001 002 003	Ford Cosworth DFV 3.0 V8	G	Peter Revson											Ret	73	1st
1971	STP March Racing Team	March 711	Ford Cosworth DFV 3.0 V8	F	Ronnie Peterson	10	Ret	2	4		2	5	8	2	2	3	33 (34)	4th
1971	STP March Racing Team	March 711	Ford Cosworth DFV 3.0 V8	F	Alex Soler-Roig	Ret	Ret	DNQ	Ret	Ret							33 (34)	4th
1971	STP March Racing Team	March 711	Ford Cosworth DFV 3.0 V8	F	Nanni Galli					DNS	11			Ret	16	Ret	33 (34)	4th
1971	STP March Racing Team	March 711	Ford Cosworth DFV 3.0 V8	F	Niki Lauda								Ret				33 (34)	4th
1971	STP March Racing Team	March 711	Ford Cosworth DFV 3.0 V8	F	Mike Beuttler										NC		33 (34)	4th
1971	Clarke-Mordaunt-Guthrie Racing	March 711	Ford Cosworth DFV 3.0 V8	F	Mike Beuttler						Ret	DSQ	NC	Ret			33 (34)	4th
1971	Frank Williams Racing Cars	March 701 711	Ford Cosworth DFV 3.0 V8	F	Henri Pescarolo	11	Ret	8	NC	Ret	4	Ret	6	Ret^{F}	DNS	Ret	33 (34)	4th
1971	Frank Williams Racing Cars	March 701 711	Ford Cosworth DFV 3.0 V8	F	Max Jean						NC						33 (34)	4th
1971	Team Gunston	March 701	Ford Cosworth DFV 3.0 V8	G	John Love	Ret											33 (34)	4th
1971	Gene Mason Racing	March 711	Ford Cosworth DFV 3.0 V8	F	Skip Barber			DNQ	NC						Ret	NC	33 (34)	4th
1971	Jo Siffert Automobiles	March 701	Ford Cosworth DFV 3.0 V8	F	François Mazet					13							33 (34)	4th
1971	Shell Arnold Team	March 701	Ford Cosworth DFV 3.0 V8	F	Jean-Pierre Jarier									NC			33 (34)	4th
1971	Team Lotus	Lotus 72C 72D	Ford Cosworth DFV 3.0 V8	F	Emerson Fittipaldi	Ret	Ret	5		3	3	Ret	2		7	NC	21	5th
1971	Team Lotus	Lotus 72C 72D	Ford Cosworth DFV 3.0 V8	F	Reine Wisell	4	NC	Ret	DSQ	6		8	4		5	Ret	21	5th
1971	Team Lotus	Lotus 72C 72D	Ford Cosworth DFV 3.0 V8	F	Dave Charlton				DNS		Ret						21	5th
1971	Pete Lovely Volkswagen Inc.	Lotus 69	Ford Cosworth DFV 3.0 V8	F	Pete Lovely										NC	NC	21	5th
1971	Bruce McLaren Motor Racing	McLaren M14A M19A	Ford Cosworth DFV 3.0 V8	G	Denny Hulme	6	5	4	12	Ret	Ret	Ret	Ret		4^{F}	Ret	10	6th
1971	Bruce McLaren Motor Racing	McLaren M14A M19A	Ford Cosworth DFV 3.0 V8	G	Peter Gethin	Ret	8	Ret	Ret	9	Ret	Ret					10	6th
1971	Bruce McLaren Motor Racing	McLaren M14A M19A	Ford Cosworth DFV 3.0 V8	G	Jackie Oliver						Ret		9	7			10	6th
1971	Ecurie Bonnier	McLaren M7C	Ford Cosworth DFV 3.0 V8	G	Joakim Bonnier	Ret						DNQ	DNS	10		16	10	6th
1971	Ecurie Bonnier	McLaren M7C	Ford Cosworth DFV 3.0 V8	G	Helmut Marko							DNS					10	6th
1971	Penske-White Racing	McLaren M19A	Ford Cosworth DFV 3.0 V8	G	Mark Donohue										3	DNS	10	6th
1971	Penske-White Racing	McLaren M19A	Ford Cosworth DFV 3.0 V8	G	David Hobbs											10	10	6th
1971	Brooke Bond Oxo Team Surtees	Surtees TS7 TS9	Ford Cosworth DFV 3.0 V8	F	John Surtees	Ret	11	7	5	8	6	7	Ret	Ret	11	17	8	8th
1971	Auto Motor Und Sport Team Surtees	Surtees TS7 TS9	Ford Cosworth DFV 3.0 V8	F	Rolf Stommelen	12	Ret	6	DSQ	11	5	10	7	DNS	Ret		8	8th
1971	Team Surtees	Surtees TS7 TS9	Ford Cosworth DFV 3.0 V8	F	Brian Redman	7											8	8th
1971	Team Surtees	Surtees TS7 TS9	Ford Cosworth DFV 3.0 V8	F	Derek Bell						Ret						8	8th
1971	Team Surtees	Surtees TS7 TS9	Ford Cosworth DFV 3.0 V8	F	Mike Hailwood									4		15	8	8th
1971	Team Surtees	Surtees TS7 TS9	Ford Cosworth DFV 3.0 V8	F	Sam Posey											Ret	8	8th
1971	Team Surtees	Surtees TS7 TS9	Ford Cosworth DFV 3.0 V8	F	Gijs van Lennep											DNS	8	8th
1971	Stichting Autoraces Nederland	Surtees TS7	Ford Cosworth DFV 3.0 V8	F	Gijs van Lennep				8								8	8th
1971	Motor Racing Developments Ltd	Brabham BT33 BT34	Ford Cosworth DFV 3.0 V8	G	Graham Hill	9	Ret	Ret	10	Ret	Ret	9	5	Ret	Ret	7	5	9th
1971	Motor Racing Developments Ltd	Brabham BT33 BT34	Ford Cosworth DFV 3.0 V8	G	Dave Charlton	Ret											5	9th
1971	Motor Racing Developments Ltd	Brabham BT33 BT34	Ford Cosworth DFV 3.0 V8	G	Tim Schenken		9	10	Ret	12	12	6	3	Ret	Ret	Ret	5	9th
1971	Team Gunston	Brabham BT26A	Ford Cosworth DFV 3.0 V8	G	Jackie Pretorius	Ret											5	9th
1971	Ecurie Evergreen	Brabham BT33	Ford Cosworth DFV 3.0 V8	G	Chris Craft										DNQ	Ret	5	9th
1971	Jolly Club Switzerland	Bellasi F1	Ford Cosworth DFV 3.0 V8	G	Silvio Moser									Ret			0	-

=== 1972 ===
(key)

Year	Entrant	Chassis	Engine	Tyres	Drivers	1	2	3	4	5	6	7	8	9	10	11	12	Points	WCC
1972	John Player Team Lotus	Lotus 72D	Ford Cosworth DFV 3.0 V8	F		ARG	RSA	ESP	MON	BEL	FRA	GBR	GER	AUT	ITA	CAN	USA	61	1st
1972	John Player Team Lotus	Lotus 72D	Ford Cosworth DFV 3.0 V8	F	Emerson Fittipaldi	Ret	2	1	3^{P}	1^{P}	2	1	Ret	1^{P}	1	11	Ret	61	1st
1972	John Player Team Lotus	Lotus 72D	Ford Cosworth DFV 3.0 V8	F	David Walker	DSQ	10	9	14	14	18	Ret	Ret	Ret			Ret	61	1st
1972	John Player Team Lotus	Lotus 72D	Ford Cosworth DFV 3.0 V8	F	Reine Wisell											Ret	10	61	1st
1972	Scuderia Scribante	Lotus 72D	Ford Cosworth DFV 3.0 V8	F	Dave Charlton		Ret				DNQ	Ret	Ret					61	1st
1972	Elf Team Tyrrell	Tyrrell 002 003 004 005 006	Ford Cosworth DFV 3.0 V8	G	Jackie Stewart	1^{F}	Ret^{P}	Ret	4		1	2^{F}	11	7	Ret	1^{F}	1^{P}^{F}	51	2nd
1972	Elf Team Tyrrell	Tyrrell 002 003 004 005 006	Ford Cosworth DFV 3.0 V8	G	François Cevert	Ret	9	Ret	NC	2	4	Ret	10	9	Ret	Ret	2	51	2nd
1972	Elf Team Tyrrell	Tyrrell 002 003 004 005 006	Ford Cosworth DFV 3.0 V8	G	Patrick Depailler						NC						7	51	2nd
1972	Yardley Team McLaren	McLaren M19A M19C	Ford Cosworth DFV 3.0 V8	G	Denny Hulme	2	1	Ret	15	3	7	5	Ret	2^{F}	3	3	3	47	3rd
1972	Yardley Team McLaren	McLaren M19A M19C	Ford Cosworth DFV 3.0 V8	G	Peter Revson	Ret	3	5		7		3		3	4	2^{P}	18	47	3rd
1972	Yardley Team McLaren	McLaren M19A M19C	Ford Cosworth DFV 3.0 V8	G	Brian Redman				5		9		5					47	3rd
1972	Yardley Team McLaren	McLaren M19A M19C	Ford Cosworth DFV 3.0 V8	G	Jody Scheckter												9	47	3rd
1972	Brooke Bond Oxo Team Surtees	Surtees TS9B TS14	Ford Cosworth DFV 3.0 V8	F	Mike Hailwood		Ret^{F}	Ret	Ret	4	6	Ret	Ret	4	2		17	18	5th
1972	Brooke Bond Oxo Team Surtees	Surtees TS9B TS14	Ford Cosworth DFV 3.0 V8	F	Tim Schenken	5	Ret	8										18	5th
1972	Flame Out Team Surtees	Surtees TS9B TS14	Ford Cosworth DFV 3.0 V8	F	Tim Schenken						17	Ret						18	5th
1972	Team Surtees	Surtees TS9B TS14	Ford Cosworth DFV 3.0 V8	F	Tim Schenken				Ret	Ret			14	11	Ret	7	Ret	18	5th
1972	Team Surtees	Surtees TS9B TS14	Ford Cosworth DFV 3.0 V8	F	John Surtees										Ret		DNS	18	5th
1972	Ceramica Pagnossin Team Surtees	Surtees TS9B TS14	Ford Cosworth DFV 3.0 V8	F	Andrea de Adamich	Ret	NC	4	7	Ret	14	Ret	13	14	Ret	Ret	Ret	18	5th
1972	Team Gunston	Surtees TS9	Ford Cosworth DFV 3.0 V8	F	John Love		16											18	5th
1972	Champcar Inc.	Surtees TS9B	Ford Cosworth DFV 3.0 V8	G	Sam Posey												12	18	5th
1972	STP March Racing Team	March 721 721G 721X	Ford Cosworth DFV 3.0 V8	G	Ronnie Peterson	6	5	Ret	11	9	5	7	3	12	9	DSQ	4	15	6th
1972	STP March Racing Team	March 721 721G 721X	Ford Cosworth DFV 3.0 V8	G	Niki Lauda	11	7	Ret	16	12	Ret	9	Ret	10	13	DSQ	NC	15	6th
1972	Team Williams Motul	March 711 721	Ford Cosworth DFV 3.0 V8	G	Henri Pescarolo	8	11	11	Ret	NC	DNS		Ret	DNS	DNQ	13	14	15	6th
1972	Team Williams Motul	March 711 721	Ford Cosworth DFV 3.0 V8	G	Carlos Pace		17	6	17	5	Ret	Ret	NC	NC	Ret	9	Ret	15	6th
1972	Clarke-Mordaunt-Guthrie Racing	March 721G	Ford Cosworth DFV 3.0 V8	F	Mike Beuttler			DNQ	13	Ret	19	13	8	Ret	10	NC	13	15	6th
1972	Gene Mason Racing	March 711	Ford Cosworth DFV 3.0 V8	F	Skip Barber											NC	16	15	6th
1972	Motor Racing Developments Ltd	Brabham BT33 BT34 BT37	Ford Cosworth DFV 3.0 V8	F	Graham Hill	Ret	6	10	12	Ret	10	Ret	6	Ret	5	8	11	7	9th
1972	Motor Racing Developments Ltd	Brabham BT33 BT34 BT37	Ford Cosworth DFV 3.0 V8	F	Carlos Reutemann	7^{P}	Ret			13	12	8	Ret	Ret	Ret	4	Ret	7	9th
1972	Motor Racing Developments Ltd	Brabham BT33 BT34 BT37	Ford Cosworth DFV 3.0 V8	F	Wilson Fittipaldi			7	9	Ret	8	12	7	Ret	Ret	Ret	Ret	7	9th
1972	Team Gunston	Brabham BT33	Ford Cosworth DFV 3.0 V8	F	William Ferguson		DNS											7	9th
1972	Team Eifelland Caravans	Eifelland 21	Ford Cosworth DFV 3.0 V8	G	Rolf Stommelen		13	Ret	10	11	16	10	Ret	15				0	-
1972	Team Williams Motul	Politoys FX3	Ford Cosworth DFV 3.0 V8	G	Henri Pescarolo							Ret						0	-
1972	Connew Racing Team	Connew PC1	Ford Cosworth DFV 3.0 V8	F	François Migault							DNS		Ret				0	-

=== 1973 ===
(key)

Year	Entrant	Chassis	Engine	Tyres	Drivers	1	2	3	4	5	6	7	8	9	10	11	12	13	14	15	Points	WCC
1973	John Player Team Lotus	Lotus 72D 72E	Ford Cosworth DFV 3.0 V8	G		ARG	BRA	RSA	ESP	BEL	MON	SWE	FRA	GBR	NED	GER	AUT	ITA	CAN	USA	92 (96)	1st
1973	John Player Team Lotus	Lotus 72D 72E	Ford Cosworth DFV 3.0 V8	G	Emerson Fittipaldi	1^{F}	1^{F}	3^{F}	1	3	2	12	Ret	Ret	Ret	6	Ret^{P}	2	2^{F}	6	92 (96)	1st
1973	John Player Team Lotus	Lotus 72D 72E	Ford Cosworth DFV 3.0 V8	G	Ronnie Peterson	Ret	Ret^{P}	11	Ret^{P}^{F}	Ret	3	2^{P}	1	2^{P}	11^{P}^{F}	Ret	1	1^{P}	Ret^{P}	1^{P}	92 (96)	1st
1973	Scribante Lucky Strike Racing	Lotus 72D	Ford Cosworth DFV 3.0 V8	F	Dave Charlton			Ret													92 (96)	1st
1973	Elf Team Tyrrell	Tyrrell 005 006	Ford Cosworth DFV 3.0 V8	G	Jackie Stewart	3	2	1	Ret	1	1^{P}	5	4^{P}	10	1	1^{P}	2	4^{F}	5	DNS	82 (86)	2nd
1973	Elf Team Tyrrell	Tyrrell 005 006	Ford Cosworth DFV 3.0 V8	G	François Cevert	2	10	NC	2	2^{F}	4	3	2	5	2	2	Ret	5	Ret	DNS	82 (86)	2nd
1973	Elf Team Tyrrell	Tyrrell 005 006	Ford Cosworth DFV 3.0 V8	G	Chris Amon														10	DNS	82 (86)	2nd
1973	Blignaut Lucky Strike Racing	Tyrrell 004	Ford Cosworth DFV 3.0 V8	G	Eddie Keizan			NC													82 (86)	2nd
1973	Yardley Team McLaren	McLaren M19A M19C M23	Ford Cosworth DFV 3.0 V8	G	Denny Hulme	5	3^{F}	5^{P}	6	7	6	1^{F}	8^{F}	3	Ret	12	8	15	13	4	58	3rd
1973	Yardley Team McLaren	McLaren M19A M19C M23	Ford Cosworth DFV 3.0 V8	G	Peter Revson	8	Ret	2	4	Ret	5	7		1	4	9	Ret	3	1	5	58	3rd
1973	Yardley Team McLaren	McLaren M19A M19C M23	Ford Cosworth DFV 3.0 V8	G	Jody Scheckter			9					Ret	Ret					Ret	Ret	58	3rd
1973	Yardley Team McLaren	McLaren M19A M19C M23	Ford Cosworth DFV 3.0 V8	G	Jacky Ickx											3					58	3rd
1973	Motor Racing Developments Ltd	Brabham BT37 BT42	Ford Cosworth DFV 3.0 V8	G	Carlos Reutemann	Ret	11	7	Ret	Ret	Ret	4	3	6	Ret	Ret	4	6	8	3	22	4th
1973	Motor Racing Developments Ltd	Brabham BT37 BT42	Ford Cosworth DFV 3.0 V8	G	Wilson Fittipaldi	6	Ret	Ret	10	Ret	11	Ret	16	Ret	Ret	5	Ret	Ret	11	NC	22	4th
1973	Motor Racing Developments Ltd	Brabham BT37 BT42	Ford Cosworth DFV 3.0 V8	G	John Watson									Ret						Ret	22	4th
1973	Ceramica Pagnossin MRD	Brabham BT37 BT42	Ford Cosworth DFV 3.0 V8	G	Andrea de Adamich				Ret	4	7		Ret	Ret							22	4th
1973	Ceramica Pagnossin MRD	Brabham BT37 BT42	Ford Cosworth DFV 3.0 V8	G	Rolf Stommelen											11	Ret	12	12		22	4th
1973	STP March Racing Team	March 721G 731	Ford Cosworth DFV 3.0 V8	G	Jean-Pierre Jarier	Ret	Ret	NC		Ret	Ret	Ret	Ret				Ret		NC	11	14	5th
1973	STP March Racing Team	March 721G 731	Ford Cosworth DFV 3.0 V8	G	Henri Pescarolo				8												14	5th
1973	STP March Racing Team	March 721G 731	Ford Cosworth DFV 3.0 V8	G	Roger Williamson									Ret	Ret						14	5th
1973	Clarke-Mordaunt-Guthrie Racing	March 721G 731	Ford Cosworth DFV 3.0 V8	F	Mike Beuttler	10	Ret	NC	7	11	Ret	8		11	Ret	16	Ret	Ret	Ret	10	14	5th
1973	Clarke-Mordaunt-Guthrie Racing	March 721G 731	Ford Cosworth DFV 3.0 V8	F	Reine Wisell								Ret								14	5th
1973	Team Pierre Robert	March 721G 731	Ford Cosworth DFV 3.0 V8	G	Reine Wisell							DNS									14	5th
1973	Hesketh Racing	March 731	Ford Cosworth DFV 3.0 V8	G	James Hunt						9		6	4^{F}	3		Ret	DNS	7	2	14	5th
1973	LEC Refrigeration Racing	March 731	Ford Cosworth DFV 3.0 V8	G	David Purley						Ret			DNS	Ret	15		9			14	5th
1973	UOP Shadow Racing Team	Shadow DN1	Ford Cosworth DFV 3.0 V8	G	George Follmer			6	3	Ret	DNS	14	Ret	Ret	10	Ret	Ret	10	17	14	9	8th
1973	UOP Shadow Racing Team	Shadow DN1	Ford Cosworth DFV 3.0 V8	G	Jackie Oliver			Ret	Ret	Ret	10	Ret	Ret	Ret	Ret	8	Ret	11	3	15	9	8th
1973	UOP Shadow Racing Team	Shadow DN1	Ford Cosworth DFV 3.0 V8	G	Brian Redman															DSQ	9	8th
1973	Embassy Racing	Shadow DN1	Ford Cosworth DFV 3.0 V8	G	Graham Hill				Ret	9	Ret	Ret	10	Ret	NC	13	Ret	14	16	13	9	8th
1973	Brooke Bond Oxo Team Surtees	Surtees TS9B TS14A	Ford Cosworth DFV 3.0 V8	F	Carlos Pace	Ret	Ret	Ret	Ret	8	Ret	10	13	Ret	7	4^{F}	3	Ret	18	Ret	7	9th
1973	Brooke Bond Oxo Team Surtees	Surtees TS9B TS14A	Ford Cosworth DFV 3.0 V8	F	Mike Hailwood	Ret	Ret	Ret	Ret	Ret	8	Ret	Ret	Ret	Ret	14	10	7	9	Ret	7	9th
1973	Team Surtees	Surtees TS9B TS14A	Ford Cosworth DFV 3.0 V8	F	Luiz Bueno		12														7	9th
1973	Team Surtees	Surtees TS9B TS14A	Ford Cosworth DFV 3.0 V8	F	Jochen Mass									Ret		7				Ret	7	9th
1973	Ceramica Pagnossin Team Surtees	Surtees TS9B TS14A	Ford Cosworth DFV 3.0 V8	F	Andrea de Adamich			8													7	9th
1973	Frank Williams Racing Cars	Iso-Marlboro FX3B IR	Ford Cosworth DFV 3.0 V8	F	Howden Ganley	NC	7	10	Ret	Ret	Ret	11	14	9	9	DNS	NC	NC	6	12	2	10th
1973	Frank Williams Racing Cars	Iso-Marlboro FX3B IR	Ford Cosworth DFV 3.0 V8	F	Nanni Galli	Ret	9		11	Ret	Ret										2	10th
1973	Frank Williams Racing Cars	Iso-Marlboro FX3B IR	Ford Cosworth DFV 3.0 V8	F	Jackie Pretorius			Ret													2	10th
1973	Frank Williams Racing Cars	Iso-Marlboro FX3B IR	Ford Cosworth DFV 3.0 V8	F	Tom Belsø							DNS									2	10th
1973	Frank Williams Racing Cars	Iso-Marlboro FX3B IR	Ford Cosworth DFV 3.0 V8	F	Henri Pescarolo								Ret			10					2	10th
1973	Frank Williams Racing Cars	Iso-Marlboro FX3B IR	Ford Cosworth DFV 3.0 V8	F	Graham McRae									Ret							2	10th
1973	Frank Williams Racing Cars	Iso-Marlboro FX3B IR	Ford Cosworth DFV 3.0 V8	F	Gijs van Lennep										6		9	Ret			2	10th
1973	Frank Williams Racing Cars	Iso-Marlboro FX3B IR	Ford Cosworth DFV 3.0 V8	F	Tim Schenken														14		2	10th
1973	Frank Williams Racing Cars	Iso-Marlboro FX3B IR	Ford Cosworth DFV 3.0 V8	F	Jacky Ickx															7	2	10th
1973	Team Ensign	Ensign N173	Ford Cosworth DFV 3.0 V8	F	Rikky von Opel								15	13	DNS		Ret	Ret	NC	Ret	0	-

=== 1974 ===
(key)

Year	Entrant	Chassis	Engine	Tyres	Drivers	1	2	3	4	5	6	7	8	9	10	11	12	13	14	15	Points	WCC
1974	Marlboro Team Texaco	McLaren M23	Ford Cosworth DFV 3.0 V8	G		ARG	BRA	RSA	ESP	BEL	MON	SWE	NED	FRA	GBR	GER	AUT	ITA	CAN	USA	73 (75)	1st
1974	Marlboro Team Texaco	McLaren M23	Ford Cosworth DFV 3.0 V8	G	Emerson Fittipaldi	10	1^{P}	7	3	1	5	4	3	Ret	2	Ret	Ret	2	1^{P}	4	73 (75)	1st
1974	Marlboro Team Texaco	McLaren M23	Ford Cosworth DFV 3.0 V8	G	Denny Hulme	1	12	9	6	6^{F}	Ret	Ret	Ret	6	7	DSQ	2	6	6	Ret	73 (75)	1st
1974	Yardley Team McLaren	McLaren M23	Ford Cosworth DFV 3.0 V8	G	Mike Hailwood	4	5	3	9	7	Ret	Ret	4	7	Ret	15					73 (75)	1st
1974	Yardley Team McLaren	McLaren M23	Ford Cosworth DFV 3.0 V8	G	David Hobbs												7	9			73 (75)	1st
1974	Yardley Team McLaren	McLaren M23	Ford Cosworth DFV 3.0 V8	G	Jochen Mass														16	7	73 (75)	1st
1974	Scribante Lucky Strike Racing	McLaren M23	Ford Cosworth DFV 3.0 V8	G	Dave Charlton			19													73 (75)	1st
1974	Elf Team Tyrrell	Tyrrell 005 006 007	Ford Cosworth DFV 3.0 V8	G	Jody Scheckter	Ret	13	8	5	3	2	1	5	4^{F}	1	2	Ret	3	Ret	Ret	45	3rd
1974	Elf Team Tyrrell	Tyrrell 005 006 007	Ford Cosworth DFV 3.0 V8	G	Patrick Depailler	6	8	4	8	Ret	9	2^{P}^{F}	6	8	Ret	Ret	Ret	11	5	6	45	3rd
1974	Blignaut Embassy Racing	Tyrrell 004	Ford Cosworth DFV 3.0 V8	F	Eddie Keizan			14													45	3rd
1974	John Player Team Lotus	Lotus 72E 76	Ford Cosworth DFV 3.0 V8	G	Ronnie Peterson	13^{P}	6	Ret	Ret	Ret	1^{F}	Ret	8	1	10	4	Ret	1	3	Ret	38 (40)	4th
1974	John Player Team Lotus	Lotus 72E 76	Ford Cosworth DFV 3.0 V8	G	Jacky Ickx	Ret	3	Ret	Ret	Ret	Ret	Ret	11	5	3	5	Ret	Ret	13	Ret	38 (40)	4th
1974	John Player Team Lotus	Lotus 72E 76	Ford Cosworth DFV 3.0 V8	G	Tim Schenken															DSQ	38 (40)	4th
1974	Team Gunston	Lotus 72E	Ford Cosworth DFV 3.0 V8	F	Ian Scheckter			13													38 (40)	4th
1974	Team Gunston	Lotus 72E	Ford Cosworth DFV 3.0 V8	F	Paddy Driver			Ret													38 (40)	4th
1974	Motor Racing Developments Ltd	Brabham BT42 BT44	Ford Cosworth DFV 3.0 V8	G	Carlos Reutemann	7	7	1^{F}	Ret	Ret	Ret	Ret	12	Ret	6	3	4	Ret	1	1^{P}	35	5th
1974	Motor Racing Developments Ltd	Brabham BT42 BT44	Ford Cosworth DFV 3.0 V8	G	Richard Robarts	Ret	15	17													35	5th
1974	Motor Racing Developments Ltd	Brabham BT42 BT44	Ford Cosworth DFV 3.0 V8	G	Rikky von Opel				Ret	Ret	DNQ	9	9	DNQ							35	5th
1974	Motor Racing Developments Ltd	Brabham BT42 BT44	Ford Cosworth DFV 3.0 V8	G	Teddy Pilette					17											35	5th
1974	Motor Racing Developments Ltd	Brabham BT42 BT44	Ford Cosworth DFV 3.0 V8	G	Carlos Pace										9	12	Ret	5^{F}	8	2^{F}	35	5th
1974	John Goldie Racing with Hexagon	Brabham BT42 BT44	Ford Cosworth DFV 3.0 V8	F	Carlos Pace									DNQ							35	5th
1974	John Goldie Racing with Hexagon	Brabham BT42 BT44	Ford Cosworth DFV 3.0 V8	F	John Watson	12	Ret	Ret	11	11	6	11	7	16	11	Ret	4	7	Ret	5	35	5th
1974	Scuderia Finotto	Brabham BT42	Ford Cosworth DFV 3.0 V8	F	Gérard Larrousse					Ret				DNQ							35	5th
1974	Scuderia Finotto	Brabham BT42	Ford Cosworth DFV 3.0 V8	F	Helmut Koinigg												DNQ				35	5th
1974	Scuderia Finotto	Brabham BT42	Ford Cosworth DFV 3.0 V8	F	Carlo Facetti													DNQ			35	5th
1974	Allied Polymer Group	Brabham BT42	Ford Cosworth DFV 3.0 V8	G	Lella Lombardi										DNQ						35	5th
1974	Team Canada F1 Racing	Brabham BT42	Ford Cosworth DFV 3.0 V8	G	Eppie Wietzes														Ret		35	5th
1974	The Chequered Flag	Brabham BT42	Ford Cosworth DFV 3.0 V8	G	Ian Ashley														DNQ	DNQ	35	5th
1974	Hesketh Racing	Hesketh 308	Ford Cosworth DFV 3.0 V8	F G	James Hunt			Ret	10	Ret	Ret	3	Ret	Ret	Ret	Ret	3	Ret	4	3	15	6th
1974	Hesketh Racing	Hesketh 308	Ford Cosworth DFV 3.0 V8	F G	Ian Scheckter												DNQ				15	6th
1974	UOP Shadow Racing Team	Shadow DN1 DN3	Ford Cosworth DFV 3.0 V8	G	Jean-Pierre Jarier	Ret	Ret		Ret	13	3	5	Ret	12	Ret	8	8	Ret	Ret	10	7	8th
1974	UOP Shadow Racing Team	Shadow DN1 DN3	Ford Cosworth DFV 3.0 V8	G	Peter Revson	Ret	Ret														7	8th
1974	UOP Shadow Racing Team	Shadow DN1 DN3	Ford Cosworth DFV 3.0 V8	G	Brian Redman				7	18	Ret										7	8th
1974	UOP Shadow Racing Team	Shadow DN1 DN3	Ford Cosworth DFV 3.0 V8	G	Bertil Roos							Ret									7	8th
1974	UOP Shadow Racing Team	Shadow DN1 DN3	Ford Cosworth DFV 3.0 V8	G	Tom Pryce								Ret	Ret	8	6	Ret	10	Ret	NC	7	8th
1974	March Engineering	March 741	Ford Cosworth DFV 3.0 V8	G	Hans-Joachim Stuck	Ret	Ret	5	4	Ret	Ret		Ret	DNQ	Ret	7	11	Ret	Ret	DNQ	6	9th
1974	March Engineering	March 741	Ford Cosworth DFV 3.0 V8	G	Reine Wisell							Ret									6	9th
1974	March Engineering	March 741	Ford Cosworth DFV 3.0 V8	G	Howden Ganley	8	Ret														6	9th
1974	March Engineering	March 741	Ford Cosworth DFV 3.0 V8	G	Vittorio Brambilla			10	DNS	9	Ret	10	10	11	Ret	13	6	Ret	DNQ	Ret	6	9th
1974	Hesketh Racing	March 731	Ford Cosworth DFV 3.0 V8	F	James Hunt	Ret	9														6	9th
1974	Dempster International Racing Team	March 731	Ford Cosworth DFV 3.0 V8	F	Mike Wilds										DNQ						6	9th
1974	Frank Williams Racing Cars	Iso-Marlboro FW	Ford Cosworth DFV 3.0 V8	F	Arturo Merzario	Ret	Ret	6	Ret	Ret	Ret	DNS	Ret	9	Ret	Ret	Ret	4	Ret	Ret	4	10th
1974	Frank Williams Racing Cars	Iso-Marlboro FW	Ford Cosworth DFV 3.0 V8	F	Tom Belsø			Ret	DNQ			8			DNQ						4	10th
1974	Frank Williams Racing Cars	Iso-Marlboro FW	Ford Cosworth DFV 3.0 V8	F	Gijs van Lennep					14			DNQ								4	10th
1974	Frank Williams Racing Cars	Iso-Marlboro FW	Ford Cosworth DFV 3.0 V8	F	Richard Robarts							DNS									4	10th
1974	Frank Williams Racing Cars	Iso-Marlboro FW	Ford Cosworth DFV 3.0 V8	F	Jacques Laffite											Ret	NC	Ret	15	Ret	4	10th
1974	Frank Williams Racing Cars	Iso-Marlboro FW	Ford Cosworth DFV 3.0 V8	F	Jean-Pierre Jabouille									DNQ							4	10th
1974	Team Surtees	Surtees TS16	Ford Cosworth DFV 3.0 V8	F	Jean-Pierre Jabouille												DNQ				3	11th
1974	Team Surtees	Surtees TS16	Ford Cosworth DFV 3.0 V8	F	Carlos Pace	Ret	4														3	11th
1974	Team Surtees	Surtees TS16	Ford Cosworth DFV 3.0 V8	F	Jochen Mass	Ret	17	Ret	Ret	Ret	DNS	Ret	Ret	Ret	14	Ret					3	11th
1974	Team Surtees	Surtees TS16	Ford Cosworth DFV 3.0 V8	F	José Dolhem									DNQ				DNQ		Ret	3	11th
1974	Team Surtees	Surtees TS16	Ford Cosworth DFV 3.0 V8	F	Helmut Koinigg														10	Ret	3	11th
1974	Team Surtees	Surtees TS16	Ford Cosworth DFV 3.0 V8	F	Derek Bell												DNQ	DNQ	DNQ		3	11th
1974	Bang & Olufsen Team Surtees	Surtees TS16	Ford Cosworth DFV 3.0 V8	F	Derek Bell										DNQ	11					3	11th
1974	Bang & Olufsen Team Surtees	Surtees TS16	Ford Cosworth DFV 3.0 V8	F	Carlos Pace			11	13	Ret	Ret	Ret									3	11th
1974	Memphis International Team Surtees	Surtees TS16	Ford Cosworth DFV 3.0 V8	F	Dieter Quester												9				3	11th
1974	AAW Racing Team	Surtees TS16	Ford Cosworth DFV 3.0 V8	F	Leo Kinnunen					DNQ		Ret		DNQ	DNQ		DNQ	DNQ			3	11th
1974	Embassy Racing with Graham Hill	Lola T370	Ford Cosworth DFV 3.0 V8	F	Graham Hill	Ret	11	12	Ret	8	7	6	Ret	13	13	9	12	8	14	8	1	12th
1974	Embassy Racing with Graham Hill	Lola T370	Ford Cosworth DFV 3.0 V8	F	Guy Edwards	11	Ret		DNQ	12	8	7	Ret	15	DNQ	DNQ					1	12th
1974	Embassy Racing with Graham Hill	Lola T370	Ford Cosworth DFV 3.0 V8	F	Peter Gethin										Ret						1	12th
1974	Embassy Racing with Graham Hill	Lola T370	Ford Cosworth DFV 3.0 V8	F	Rolf Stommelen												Ret	Ret	11	12	1	12th
1974	Vel's Parnelli Jones Racing	Parnelli VPJ4	Ford Cosworth DFV 3.0 V8	F	Mario Andretti														7	DSQ	0	NC
1974	Trojan–Tauranac Racing	Trojan T103	Ford Cosworth DFV 3.0 V8	F	Tim Schenken				14	10	Ret		DNQ		Ret	DNQ	10	Ret			0	NC
1974	Penske Cars	Penske PC1	Ford Cosworth DFV 3.0 V8	G	Mark Donohue														NC	NC	0	NC
1974	Token Racing	Token RJ02	Ford Cosworth DFV 3.0 V8	F	Tom Pryce					Ret											0	NC
1974	Token Racing	Token RJ02	Ford Cosworth DFV 3.0 V8	F	David Purley										DNQ						0	NC
1974	Token Racing	Token RJ02	Ford Cosworth DFV 3.0 V8	F	Ian Ashley											14	NC				0	NC
1974	Team Ensign	Ensign N174	Ford Cosworth DFV 3.0 V8	F	Rikky von Opel	DNS															0	NC
1974	Team Ensign	Ensign N174	Ford Cosworth DFV 3.0 V8	F	Vern Schuppan					15	Ret	DSQ	DSQ	DNQ	DNQ	Ret					0	NC
1974	Team Ensign	Ensign N174	Ford Cosworth DFV 3.0 V8	F	Mike Wilds												DNQ	DNQ	DNQ	NC	0	NC
1974	Chris Amon Racing	Amon AF101	Ford Cosworth DFV 3.0 V8	F	Chris Amon				Ret		DNS					DNQ		DNQ			0	NC
1974	Chris Amon Racing	Amon AF101	Ford Cosworth DFV 3.0 V8	F	Larry Perkins											DNQ					0	NC
1974	Maki Engineering	Maki F101	Ford Cosworth DFV 3.0 V8	F	Howden Ganley										DNQ	DNQ					0	NC
1974	Pinch Plant Ltd.	Lyncar 006	Ford Cosworth DFV 3.0 V8	F	John Nicholson										DNQ						0	NC

=== 1975 ===
(key)

Year	Entrant	Chassis	Engine	Tyres	Drivers	1	2	3	4	5	6	7	8	9	10	11	12	13	14	Points	WCC
1975	Martini Racing	Brabham BT44B	Ford Cosworth DFV 3.0 V8	G		ARG	BRA	RSA	ESP	MON	BEL	SWE	NED	FRA	GBR	GER	AUT	ITA	USA	54 (56)	2nd
1975	Martini Racing	Brabham BT44B	Ford Cosworth DFV 3.0 V8	G	Carlos Reutemann	3	8	2	3^{‡}	9	3	2	4	14	Ret	1	14	4	Ret	54 (56)	2nd
1975	Martini Racing	Brabham BT44B	Ford Cosworth DFV 3.0 V8	G	Carlos Pace	Ret	1	4^{P}^{F}	Ret	3	8	Ret	5	Ret	2	Ret	Ret	Ret	Ret	54 (56)	2nd
1975	Marlboro Team McLaren	McLaren M23	Ford Cosworth DFV 3.0 V8	G	Emerson Fittipaldi	1	2	NC	DNS	2	7	8	Ret	4	1	Ret	9	2	2^{F}	53	3rd
1975	Marlboro Team McLaren	McLaren M23	Ford Cosworth DFV 3.0 V8	G	Jochen Mass	14	3	6	1^{‡}	6	Ret	Ret	Ret	3	7	Ret	4^{‡}	Ret	3	53	3rd
1975	Lucky Strike Racing	McLaren M23	Ford Cosworth DFV 3.0 V8	G	Dave Charlton			14												53	3rd
1975	Hesketh Racing	Hesketh 308 308B 308C	Ford Cosworth DFV 3.0 V8	G	James Hunt	2	6	Ret	Ret	Ret	Ret	Ret	1	2	4	Ret	2^{‡}	5	4	33	4th
1975	Hesketh Racing	Hesketh 308 308B 308C	Ford Cosworth DFV 3.0 V8	G	Brett Lunger							13	10	Ret						33	4th
1975	Polar Caravans	Hesketh 308 308B 308C	Ford Cosworth DFV 3.0 V8	G	Torsten Palm					DNQ		10								33	4th
1975	Warsteiner Brewery	Hesketh 308 308B 308C	Ford Cosworth DFV 3.0 V8	G	Harald Ertl											8	Ret	9		33	4th
1975	Custom Made Harry Stiller Racing	Hesketh 308B	Ford Cosworth DFV 3.0 V8	G	Alan Jones				Ret	Ret	Ret	11								33	4th
1975	Elf Team Tyrrell	Tyrrell 007	Ford Cosworth DFV 3.0 V8	G	Jody Scheckter	11	Ret	1	Ret	7	2	7	16	9	3	Ret	8	8	6	25	5th
1975	Elf Team Tyrrell	Tyrrell 007	Ford Cosworth DFV 3.0 V8	G	Patrick Depailler	5	Ret	3	Ret	5^{F}	4	12	9	6	9	9	11	7	Ret	25	5th
1975	Elf Team Tyrrell	Tyrrell 007	Ford Cosworth DFV 3.0 V8	G	Jean-Pierre Jabouille									12						25	5th
1975	Elf Team Tyrrell	Tyrrell 007	Ford Cosworth DFV 3.0 V8	G	Michel Leclère														Ret	25	5th
1975	Lexington Racing	Tyrrell 007	Ford Cosworth DFV 3.0 V8	G	Ian Scheckter			Ret												25	5th
1975	UOP Shadow Racing Team	Shadow DN3B DN5	Ford Cosworth DFV 3.0 V8	G	Tom Pryce	12	Ret	9	Ret	Ret	6	Ret	6	Ret	Ret	4	3^{‡}	6	NC	9.5	6th
1975	UOP Shadow Racing Team	Shadow DN3B DN5	Ford Cosworth DFV 3.0 V8	G	Jean-Pierre Jarier	DNS^{P}	Ret^{P}^{F}	Ret	4^{‡}	Ret	Ret	Ret	Ret	8	14	Ret			Ret	9.5	6th
1975	John Player Team Lotus	Lotus 72E 72F	Ford Cosworth DFV 3.0 V8	G	Ronnie Peterson	Ret	15	10	Ret	4	Ret	9	15	10	Ret	Ret	5^{‡}	Ret	5	9	7th
1975	John Player Team Lotus	Lotus 72E 72F	Ford Cosworth DFV 3.0 V8	G	Jacky Ickx	8	9	12	2^{‡}	8	Ret	15	Ret	Ret						9	7th
1975	John Player Team Lotus	Lotus 72E 72F	Ford Cosworth DFV 3.0 V8	G	Jim Crawford										Ret			13		9	7th
1975	John Player Team Lotus	Lotus 72E 72F	Ford Cosworth DFV 3.0 V8	G	Brian Henton										16		DNS		NC	9	7th
1975	John Player Team Lotus	Lotus 72E 72F	Ford Cosworth DFV 3.0 V8	G	John Watson											Ret				9	7th
1975	Team Gunston	Lotus 72	Ford Cosworth DFV 3.0 V8	G	Guy Tunmer			11												9	7th
1975	Team Gunston	Lotus 72	Ford Cosworth DFV 3.0 V8	G	Eddie Keizan			13												9	7th
1975	Beta Team March	March 741 751	Ford Cosworth DFV 3.0 V8	G	Vittorio Brambilla	9	Ret	Ret	5^{‡}	Ret	Ret	Ret^{P}	Ret	Ret	6	Ret	1^{F}^{‡}	Ret	7	7.5	8th
1975	March Engineering	March 741 751	Ford Cosworth DFV 3.0 V8	G	Lella Lombardi			Ret												7.5	8th
1975	Lavazza March	March 741 751	Ford Cosworth DFV 3.0 V8	G	Lella Lombardi				6^{‡}	DNQ	Ret	Ret	14	8	Ret	7	17	Ret		7.5	8th
1975	Lavazza March	March 741 751	Ford Cosworth DFV 3.0 V8	G	Hans-Joachim Stuck										Ret	Ret	Ret	Ret	8	7.5	8th
1975	Penske Cars	March 751	Ford Cosworth DFV 3.0 V8	G	Mark Donohue										5	Ret	DNS			7.5	8th
1975	Frank Williams Racing Cars	Williams FW FW04	Ford Cosworth DFV 3.0 V8	G	Jacques Laffite	Ret	11	NC		DNQ	Ret		Ret	11	Ret	2	Ret	Ret	DNS	6	9th
1975	Frank Williams Racing Cars	Williams FW FW04	Ford Cosworth DFV 3.0 V8	G	Arturo Merzario	NC	Ret	Ret	Ret	DNQ	Ret									6	9th
1975	Frank Williams Racing Cars	Williams FW FW04	Ford Cosworth DFV 3.0 V8	G	Tony Brise				7											6	9th
1975	Frank Williams Racing Cars	Williams FW FW04	Ford Cosworth DFV 3.0 V8	G	Damien Magee							14								6	9th
1975	Frank Williams Racing Cars	Williams FW FW04	Ford Cosworth DFV 3.0 V8	G	Ian Scheckter							Ret	12							6	9th
1975	Frank Williams Racing Cars	Williams FW FW04	Ford Cosworth DFV 3.0 V8	G	François Migault									DNS						6	9th
1975	Frank Williams Racing Cars	Williams FW FW04	Ford Cosworth DFV 3.0 V8	G	Ian Ashley											DNS				6	9th
1975	Frank Williams Racing Cars	Williams FW FW04	Ford Cosworth DFV 3.0 V8	G	Jo Vonlanthen												Ret			6	9th
1975	Frank Williams Racing Cars	Williams FW FW04	Ford Cosworth DFV 3.0 V8	G	Renzo Zorzi													14		6	9th
1975	Frank Williams Racing Cars	Williams FW FW04	Ford Cosworth DFV 3.0 V8	G	Lella Lombardi														DNS	6	9th
1975	Vel's Parnelli Jones Racing	Parnelli VPJ4	Ford Cosworth DFV 3.0 V8	F G	Mario Andretti	Ret	7	17	Ret^{F}	Ret		4		5	12	10	Ret	Ret	Ret	5	10th
1975	Embassy Racing with Graham Hill	Hill GH1	Ford Cosworth DFV 3.0 V8	G	Rolf Stommelen				Ret									16	Ret	3	11th
1975	Embassy Racing with Graham Hill	Hill GH1	Ford Cosworth DFV 3.0 V8	G	François Migault				NC		Ret									3	11th
1975	Embassy Racing with Graham Hill	Hill GH1	Ford Cosworth DFV 3.0 V8	G	Graham Hill					DNQ										3	11th
1975	Embassy Racing with Graham Hill	Hill GH1	Ford Cosworth DFV 3.0 V8	G	Tony Brise						Ret	6	7	7	15	Ret	15	Ret	Ret	3	11th
1975	Embassy Racing with Graham Hill	Hill GH1	Ford Cosworth DFV 3.0 V8	G	Vern Schuppan							Ret								3	11th
1975	Embassy Racing with Graham Hill	Hill GH1	Ford Cosworth DFV 3.0 V8	G	Alan Jones								13	16	10	5				3	11th
1975	Penske Cars	Penske PC1	Ford Cosworth DFV 3.0 V8	G	Mark Donohue	7	Ret	8	Ret	Ret	11	5	8	Ret						2	12th
1975	Penske Cars	Penske PC1	Ford Cosworth DFV 3.0 V8	G	John Watson														9	2	12th
1975	HB Bewaking Team Ensign	Ensign N174 N175	Ford Cosworth DFV 3.0 V8	G	Roelof Wunderink				Ret	DNQ					DNQ		NC	DNQ	Ret	1	13th
1975	HB Bewaking Team Ensign	Ensign N174 N175	Ford Cosworth DFV 3.0 V8	G	Gijs van Lennep								10	15		6				1	13th
1975	HB Bewaking Team Ensign	Ensign N174 N175	Ford Cosworth DFV 3.0 V8	G	Chris Amon												12	12		1	13th
1975	Embassy Racing with Graham Hill	Lola T370 T371	Ford Cosworth DFV 3.0 V8	G	Graham Hill	10	12	DNQ												0	NC
1975	Embassy Racing with Graham Hill	Lola T370 T371	Ford Cosworth DFV 3.0 V8	G	Rolf Stommelen	13	14	7												0	NC
1975	Team Surtees	Surtees TS16	Ford Cosworth DFV 3.0 V8	G	John Watson	DSQ	10	Ret	8	Ret	10	16	Ret	13	11		10			0	NC
1975	National Organs Team Surtees	Surtees TS16	Ford Cosworth DFV 3.0 V8	G	Dave Morgan										18					0	NC
1975	Copersucar-Fittipaldi	Fittipaldi FD01 FD02 FD03	Ford Cosworth DFV 3.0 V8	G	Wilson Fittipaldi	Ret	13	DNQ	Ret	DNQ	12	17	11	Ret	19	Ret	DNS		10	0	NC
1975	Copersucar-Fittipaldi	Fittipaldi FD01 FD02 FD03	Ford Cosworth DFV 3.0 V8	G	Arturo Merzario													11		0	NC
1975	Pinch Plant Ltd.	Lyncar 006	Ford Cosworth DFV 3.0 V8	G	John Nicholson										17					0	NC
1975	Maki Engineering	Maki F101C	Ford Cosworth DFV 3.0 V8	G	Hiroshi Fushida								DNS		DNQ					0	NC
1975	Maki Engineering	Maki F101C	Ford Cosworth DFV 3.0 V8	G	Tony Trimmer											DNQ	DNQ	DNQ		0	NC

=== 1976 ===
(key)

Year	Entrant	Chassis	Engine	Tyres	Drivers	1	2	3	4	5	6	7	8	9	10	11	12	13	14	15	16	Points	WCC
1976	Marlboro Team McLaren	McLaren M23 M26	Ford Cosworth DFV 3.0 V8	G		BRA	RSA	USW	ESP	BEL	MON	SWE	FRA	GBR	GER	AUT	NED	ITA	CAN	USA	JPN	74 (75)	2nd
1976	Marlboro Team McLaren	McLaren M23 M26	Ford Cosworth DFV 3.0 V8	G	James Hunt	Ret^{P}	2^{P}	Ret	1^{P}	Ret	Ret	5	1^{P}	DSQ	1^{P}	4^{P}^{F}	1	Ret	1^{P}	1^{P}^{F}	3	74 (75)	2nd
1976	Marlboro Team McLaren	McLaren M23 M26	Ford Cosworth DFV 3.0 V8	G	Jochen Mass	6	3	5	Ret^{F}	6	5	11	15	Ret	3	7	9	Ret	5	4	Ret	74 (75)	2nd
1976	Elf Team Tyrrell	Tyrrell 007 P34	Ford Cosworth DFV 3.0 V8	G	Jody Scheckter	5	4	Ret	Ret	4	2	1^{P}	6	2	2^{F}	Ret	5	4	4	2	Ret	71	3rd
1976	Elf Team Tyrrell	Tyrrell 007 P34	Ford Cosworth DFV 3.0 V8	G	Patrick Depailler	2	9	3	Ret	Ret	3	2	2	Ret	Ret	Ret	7	6	2	Ret	2	71	3rd
1976	Lexington Racing	Tyrrell 007	Ford Cosworth DFV 3.0 V8	G	Ian Scheckter		Ret															71	3rd
1976	Scuderia Gulf Rondini	Tyrrell 007	Ford Cosworth DFV 3.0 V8	G	Alessandro Pesenti-Rossi										14	11	DNQ	18				71	3rd
1976	ÖASC Racing Team	Tyrrell 007	Ford Cosworth DFV 3.0 V8	G	Otto Stuppacher													DNS	DNQ	DNQ		71	3rd
1976	Heros Racing	Tyrrell 007	Ford Cosworth DFV 3.0 V8	B	Kazuyoshi Hoshino																Ret	71	3rd
1976	John Player Team Lotus	Lotus 77	Ford Cosworth DFV 3.0 V8	G	Mario Andretti	Ret			Ret	Ret		Ret^{F}	5	Ret	12	5	3	Ret	3	Ret	1^{P}	29	4th
1976	John Player Team Lotus	Lotus 77	Ford Cosworth DFV 3.0 V8	G	Ronnie Peterson	Ret																29	4th
1976	John Player Team Lotus	Lotus 77	Ford Cosworth DFV 3.0 V8	G	Bob Evans		10	DNQ														29	4th
1976	John Player Team Lotus	Lotus 77	Ford Cosworth DFV 3.0 V8	G	Gunnar Nilsson		Ret	Ret	3	Ret	Ret	Ret	Ret	Ret	5	3	Ret	13	12	Ret	6	29	4th
1976	Citibank Team Penske	Penske PC3 PC4	Ford Cosworth DFV 3.0 V8	G	John Watson	Ret	5	NC	Ret	7	10	Ret	3	3	7	1	Ret	11	10	6	Ret	20	5th
1976	F&S Properties	Penske PC3	Ford Cosworth DFV 3.0 V8	G	Boy Hayje												Ret					20	5th
1976	Beta Team March	March 761	Ford Cosworth DFV 3.0 V8	G	Vittorio Brambilla	Ret	8	Ret	Ret	Ret	Ret	10	Ret	Ret	Ret	Ret	6	7	14	Ret	Ret	19	7th
1976	Lavazza March	March 761	Ford Cosworth DFV 3.0 V8	G	Lella Lombardi	14																19	7th
1976	March Engineering	March 761	Ford Cosworth DFV 3.0 V8	G	Hans-Joachim Stuck	4	12	Ret	Ret	Ret	4	Ret	7	Ret	Ret	Ret	Ret	Ret	Ret	5	Ret	19	7th
1976	March Engineering	March 761	Ford Cosworth DFV 3.0 V8	G	Ronnie Peterson		Ret	10	Ret	Ret	Ret	7	19	Ret	Ret	6	Ret^{P}	1^{F}	9	Ret	Ret	19	7th
1976	Ovoro Team March	March 761	Ford Cosworth DFV 3.0 V8	G	Arturo Merzario			DNQ	Ret	Ret	DNQ	14	9	Ret								19	7th
1976	Shadow Racing Team	Shadow DN5B DN8	Ford Cosworth DFV 3.0 V8	G	Tom Pryce	3	7	Ret	8	10	7	9	8	4	8	Ret	4	8	11	Ret	Ret	10	8th
1976	Shadow Racing Team	Shadow DN5B DN8	Ford Cosworth DFV 3.0 V8	G	Jean-Pierre Jarier	Ret^{F}	Ret	7	Ret	9	8	12	12	9	11	Ret	10	19	18	10	10	10	8th
1976	Team P R Reilly	Shadow DN3B	Ford Cosworth DFV 3.0 V8	G	Mike Wilds									DNQ								10	8th
1976	Team Surtees	Surtees TS19	Ford Cosworth DFV 3.0 V8	G	Brett Lunger		11	DNQ	DNQ	Ret		15	16	Ret	Ret	10		14	15	11		7	10th
1976	Team Surtees	Surtees TS19	Ford Cosworth DFV 3.0 V8	G	Conny Andersson												Ret					7	10th
1976	Team Surtees	Surtees TS19	Ford Cosworth DFV 3.0 V8	G	Noritake Takahara																9	7	10th
1976	Durex Team Surtees	Surtees TS19	Ford Cosworth DFV 3.0 V8	G	Alan Jones			NC	9	5	Ret	13	Ret	5	10	Ret	8	12	16	8	4	7	10th
1976	Team Norev / BS Fabrications	Surtees TS19	Ford Cosworth DFV 3.0 V8	G	Henri Pescarolo						DNQ		Ret	Ret	DNQ	9	11	17	9	NC		7	10th
1976	Shellsport Whiting	Surtees TS16	Ford Cosworth DFV 3.0 V8	G	Divina Galica									DNQ								7	10th
1976	Copersucar-Fittipaldi	Fittipaldi FD03 FD04	Ford Cosworth DFV 3.0 V8	G	Emerson Fittipaldi	13	17	6	Ret	DNQ	6	Ret	Ret	6	13	Ret	Ret	15	Ret	9	Ret	3	11th
1976	Copersucar-Fittipaldi	Fittipaldi FD03 FD04	Ford Cosworth DFV 3.0 V8	G	Ingo Hoffmann	11		DNQ	DNQ				DNQ									3	11th
1976	Team Ensign	Ensign N174 N176	Ford Cosworth DFV 3.0 V8	G	Chris Amon		14	8	5	Ret	13	Ret		Ret	Ret							2	12th
1976	Team Ensign	Ensign N174 N176	Ford Cosworth DFV 3.0 V8	G	Patrick Nève								18									2	12th
1976	Team Ensign	Ensign N174 N176	Ford Cosworth DFV 3.0 V8	G	Hans Binder											Ret						2	12th
1976	Team Ensign	Ensign N174 N176	Ford Cosworth DFV 3.0 V8	G	Jacky Ickx												Ret	10	13	Ret		2	12th
1976	Vel's Parnelli Jones Racing	Parnelli VPJ4	Ford Cosworth DFV 3.0 V8	G	Mario Andretti		6	Ret														1	13th
1976	Hesketh Racing	Hesketh 308D	Ford Cosworth DFV 3.0 V8	G	Harald Ertl		15	DNQ	DNQ	Ret	DNQ	Ret	Ret	7	Ret	8	Ret	16	DNS	13	8	0	NC
1976	Hesketh Racing	Hesketh 308D	Ford Cosworth DFV 3.0 V8	G	Rolf Stommelen												12					0	NC
1976	Hesketh Racing	Hesketh 308D	Ford Cosworth DFV 3.0 V8	G	Alex Ribeiro															12		0	NC
1976	Penthouse Rizla Racing	Hesketh 308D	Ford Cosworth DFV 3.0 V8	G	Guy Edwards					DNQ			17	Ret	15			DNS	20			0	NC
1976	Wolf-Williams Racing	Wolf-Williams FW04 FW05	Ford Cosworth DFV 3.0 V8	G	Jacky Ickx	8	16	DNQ	7	DNQ	DNQ		10	DNQ								0	NC
1976	Wolf-Williams Racing	Wolf-Williams FW04 FW05	Ford Cosworth DFV 3.0 V8	G	Renzo Zorzi	9																0	NC
1976	Wolf-Williams Racing	Wolf-Williams FW04 FW05	Ford Cosworth DFV 3.0 V8	G	Michel Leclère		13	DNQ	10	11	11	Ret	13									0	NC
1976	Wolf-Williams Racing	Wolf-Williams FW04 FW05	Ford Cosworth DFV 3.0 V8	G	Arturo Merzario										Ret	Ret	Ret	DNS	Ret	Ret	Ret	0	NC
1976	Wolf-Williams Racing	Wolf-Williams FW04 FW05	Ford Cosworth DFV 3.0 V8	G	Chris Amon														DNS			0	NC
1976	Wolf-Williams Racing	Wolf-Williams FW04 FW05	Ford Cosworth DFV 3.0 V8	G	Warwick Brown															14		0	NC
1976	Wolf-Williams Racing	Wolf-Williams FW04 FW05	Ford Cosworth DFV 3.0 V8	G	Hans Binder																Ret	0	NC
1976	Wolf-Williams Racing	Wolf-Williams FW04 FW05	Ford Cosworth DFV 3.0 V8	G	Masami Kuwashima																DNS	0	NC
1976	HB Bewaking Alarm Systems	Boro 001	Ford Cosworth DFV 3.0 V8	G	Larry Perkins				13	8	DNQ	Ret					Ret	Ret				0	NC
1976	Kojima Engineering	Kojima KE007	Ford Cosworth DFV 3.0 V8	D	Masahiro Hasemi																11	0	NC
1976	RAM Racing	Brabham BT44B	Ford Cosworth DFV 3.0 V8	G	Loris Kessel				DNQ	12		Ret	DNQ			NC						0	NC
1976	RAM Racing	Brabham BT44B	Ford Cosworth DFV 3.0 V8	G	Emilio de Villota				DNQ													0	NC
1976	RAM Racing	Brabham BT44B	Ford Cosworth DFV 3.0 V8	G	Patrick Nève					Ret												0	NC
1976	RAM Racing	Brabham BT44B	Ford Cosworth DFV 3.0 V8	G	Jac Nellemann							DNQ										0	NC
1976	RAM Racing	Brabham BT44B	Ford Cosworth DFV 3.0 V8	G	Damien Magee								DNQ									0	NC
1976	RAM Racing	Brabham BT44B	Ford Cosworth DFV 3.0 V8	G	Bob Evans									Ret								0	NC
1976	RAM Racing	Brabham BT44B	Ford Cosworth DFV 3.0 V8	G	Lella Lombardi									DNQ	DNQ	12						0	NC
1976	RAM Racing	Brabham BT44B	Ford Cosworth DFV 3.0 V8	G	Rolf Stommelen										DNS							0	NC
1976	Mapfre-Williams	Williams FW04	Ford Cosworth DFV 3.0 V8	G	Emilio Zapico				DNQ													0	NC
1976	Maki Engineering	Maki F102A	Ford Cosworth DFV 3.0 V8	G	Tony Trimmer																DNQ	0	NC

=== 1977 ===
(key)

Year	Entrant	Chassis	Engine	Tyres	Drivers	1	2	3	4	5	6	7	8	9	10	11	12	13	14	15	16	17	Points	WCC
1977	John Player Team Lotus	Lotus 78	Ford Cosworth DFV 3.0 V8	G		ARG	BRA	RSA	USW	ESP	MON	BEL	SWE	FRA	GBR	GER	AUT	NED	ITA	USA	CAN	JPN	62	2nd
1977	John Player Team Lotus	Lotus 78	Ford Cosworth DFV 3.0 V8	G	Mario Andretti	5	Ret	Ret	1	1^{P}	5	Ret^{P}	6^{P}^{F}	1^{P}^{F}	14	Ret	Ret	Ret^{P}	1^{F}	2	9^{P}^{F}	Ret^{P}	62	2nd
1977	John Player Team Lotus	Lotus 78	Ford Cosworth DFV 3.0 V8	G	Gunnar Nilsson	DNS	5	12	8	5	Ret	1^{F}	19	4	3	Ret	Ret	Ret	Ret	Ret	Ret	Ret	62	2nd
1977	Marlboro Team McLaren	McLaren M23 M26	Ford Cosworth DFV 3.0 V8	G	James Hunt	Ret^{P}^{F}	2^{P}^{F}	4^{P}	7	Ret	Ret	7	12	3	1^{P}^{F}	Ret	Ret	Ret	Ret^{P}	1^{P}	Ret	1	60	3rd
1977	Marlboro Team McLaren	McLaren M23 M26	Ford Cosworth DFV 3.0 V8	G	Jochen Mass	Ret	Ret	5	Ret	4	4	Ret	2	9	4	Ret	6	Ret	4	Ret	3	Ret	60	3rd
1977	Marlboro Team McLaren	McLaren M23 M26	Ford Cosworth DFV 3.0 V8	G	Gilles Villeneuve										11								60	3rd
1977	Marlboro Team McLaren	McLaren M23 M26	Ford Cosworth DFV 3.0 V8	G	Bruno Giacomelli														Ret				60	3rd
1977	Chesterfield Racing	McLaren M23	Ford Cosworth DFV 3.0 V8	G	Brett Lunger							DNS	11	DNQ	13	Ret	10	9	Ret	10	11		60	3rd
1977	Iberia Airlines	McLaren M23	Ford Cosworth DFV 3.0 V8	G	Emilio de Villota					13		DNQ	DNQ		DNQ	DNQ	17		DNQ				60	3rd
1977	Walter Wolf Racing	Wolf WR1 WR2 WR3	Ford Cosworth DFV 3.0 V8	G	Jody Scheckter	1	Ret	2	3	3	1^{F}	Ret	Ret	Ret	Ret	2^{P}	Ret	3	Ret	3	1	10^{F}	55	4th
1977	Elf Team Tyrrell	Tyrrell P34	Ford Cosworth DFV 3.0 V8	G	Ronnie Peterson	Ret	Ret	Ret	Ret	8	Ret	3	Ret	12	Ret	9	5	Ret	6	16^{F}	Ret	Ret	27	5th
1977	Elf Team Tyrrell	Tyrrell P34	Ford Cosworth DFV 3.0 V8	G	Patrick Depailler	Ret	Ret	3	4	Ret	Ret	8	4	Ret	Ret	Ret	13	Ret	Ret	14	2	3	27	5th
1977	Meiritsu Racing Team	Tyrrell 007	Ford Cosworth DFV 3.0 V8	D	Kunimitsu Takahashi																	9	27	5th
1977	Shadow Racing Team	Shadow DN5B DN8	Ford Cosworth DFV 3.0 V8	G	Tom Pryce	NC	Ret	Ret															23	7th
1977	Shadow Racing Team	Shadow DN5B DN8	Ford Cosworth DFV 3.0 V8	G	Renzo Zorzi	Ret	6	Ret	Ret	Ret													23	7th
1977	Shadow Racing Team	Shadow DN5B DN8	Ford Cosworth DFV 3.0 V8	G	Alan Jones				Ret	Ret	6	5	17	Ret	7	Ret	1	Ret	3	Ret	4	4	23	7th
1977	Shadow Racing Team	Shadow DN5B DN8	Ford Cosworth DFV 3.0 V8	G	Riccardo Patrese						9	Ret		Ret	Ret	10		13	Ret		10	6	23	7th
1977	Shadow Racing Team	Shadow DN5B DN8	Ford Cosworth DFV 3.0 V8	G	Jackie Oliver								9										23	7th
1977	Shadow Racing Team	Shadow DN5B DN8	Ford Cosworth DFV 3.0 V8	G	Arturo Merzario												Ret						23	7th
1977	Shadow Racing Team	Shadow DN5B DN8	Ford Cosworth DFV 3.0 V8	G	Jean-Pierre Jarier															9			23	7th
1977	Copersucar-Fittipaldi	Fittipaldi FD04 F5	Ford Cosworth DFV 3.0 V8	G	Emerson Fittipaldi	4	4	10	5	14	Ret	Ret	18	11	Ret	DNQ	11	4	DNQ	13	Ret		11	9th
1977	Copersucar-Fittipaldi	Fittipaldi FD04 F5	Ford Cosworth DFV 3.0 V8	G	Ingo Hoffmann	Ret	7																11	9th
1977	Team Ensign	Ensign N177	Ford Cosworth DFV 3.0 V8	G	Clay Regazzoni	6	Ret	9	Ret	Ret	DNQ	Ret	7	7	DNQ	Ret	Ret	Ret	5	5	Ret	Ret	10	10th
1977	Team Ensign	Ensign N177	Ford Cosworth DFV 3.0 V8	G	Jacky Ickx						10												10	10th
1977	Theodore Racing Hong Kong	Ensign N177	Ford Cosworth DFV 3.0 V8	G	Patrick Tambay										Ret	6	Ret	5	Ret	DNQ	5	Ret	10	10th
1977	Team Surtees	Surtees TS19	Ford Cosworth DFV 3.0 V8	G	Patrick Tambay									DNQ									6	11th
1977	Team Surtees	Surtees TS19	Ford Cosworth DFV 3.0 V8	G	Larry Perkins							12	DNQ	DNQ									6	11th
1977	Team Surtees	Surtees TS19	Ford Cosworth DFV 3.0 V8	G	Vern Schuppan										12	7	16	DNQ					6	11th
1977	Team Surtees	Surtees TS19	Ford Cosworth DFV 3.0 V8	G	Lamberto Leoni														DNQ				6	11th
1977	Durex Team Surtees	Surtees TS19	Ford Cosworth DFV 3.0 V8	G	Hans Binder	Ret	Ret	11	11	9	Ret									11	Ret	Ret	6	11th
1977	Beta Team Surtees	Surtees TS19	Ford Cosworth DFV 3.0 V8	G	Vittorio Brambilla	7	Ret	7	Ret	Ret	8	4	Ret	13	8	5	15	12	Ret	19	6	8	6	11th
1977	Melchester Racing	Surtees TS19	Ford Cosworth DFV 3.0 V8	G	Tony Trimmer										DNPQ								6	11th
1977	ATS Racing Team	Penske PC4	Ford Cosworth DFV 3.0 V8	G	Jean-Pierre Jarier				6	DNQ	11	11	8	Ret	9	Ret	14	Ret	Ret	9			1	12th
1977	ATS Racing Team	Penske PC4	Ford Cosworth DFV 3.0 V8	G	Hans Heyer											DSQ*							1	12th
1977	ATS Racing Team	Penske PC4	Ford Cosworth DFV 3.0 V8	G	Hans Binder												12	8	DNQ				1	12th
1977	Interscope Racing	Penske PC4	Ford Cosworth DFV 3.0 V8	G	Danny Ongais															Ret	7		1	12th
1977	Hollywood March Racing	March 761B 771	Ford Cosworth DFV 3.0 V8	G	Alex Ribeiro	Ret	Ret	Ret	Ret	DNQ	DNQ	DNQ	DNQ	DNQ	DNQ	8	DNQ	11	DNQ	15	8	12	0	NC
1977	Team Rothmans International	March 761B 771	Ford Cosworth DFV 3.0 V8	G	Ian Scheckter	Ret	Ret			11	DNQ	Ret	Ret	NC	Ret	Ret	Ret	10	Ret	Ret	Ret		0	NC
1977	Team Rothmans International	March 761B 771	Ford Cosworth DFV 3.0 V8	G	Hans-Joachim Stuck			Ret															0	NC
1977	Team Rothmans International	March 761B 771	Ford Cosworth DFV 3.0 V8	G	Brian Henton				10														0	NC
1977	British Formula One Racing Team	March 761	Ford Cosworth DFV 3.0 V8	G	Brian Henton					DNQ					DNQ		DNQ						0	NC
1977	British Formula One Racing Team	March 761	Ford Cosworth DFV 3.0 V8	G	Bernard de Dryver							DNQ											0	NC
1977	Williams Grand Prix Engineering	March 761	Ford Cosworth DFV 3.0 V8	G	Patrick Nève					12		10	15	DNQ	10	DNQ	9	DNQ	7	18	Ret		0	NC
1977	Chesterfield Racing	March 761	Ford Cosworth DFV 3.0 V8	G	Brett Lunger			14	Ret	10													0	NC
1977	Team Merzario	March 761	Ford Cosworth DFV 3.0 V8	G	Arturo Merzario					Ret	DNQ	14		Ret	Ret	DNQ		DNQ					0	NC
1977	RAM Racing/F&S Properties	March 761	Ford Cosworth DFV 3.0 V8	G	Boy Hayje			Ret		DNQ	DNQ	NC	DNQ					DNQ					0	NC
1977	RAM Racing/F&S Properties	March 761	Ford Cosworth DFV 3.0 V8	G	Mikko Kozarowitzky								DNQ		DNPQ								0	NC
1977	RAM Racing/F&S Properties	March 761	Ford Cosworth DFV 3.0 V8	G	Michael Bleekemolen													DNQ					0	NC
1977	RAM Racing	March 761	Ford Cosworth DFV 3.0 V8	G	Andy Sutcliffe										DNPQ								0	NC
1977	Penthouse Rizla Racing	Hesketh 308E	Ford Cosworth DFV 3.0 V8	G	Rupert Keegan					Ret	12	Ret	13	10	Ret	Ret	7	Ret	9	8	Ret		0	NC
1977	Hesketh Racing	Hesketh 308E	Ford Cosworth DFV 3.0 V8	G	Harald Ertl					Ret	DNQ	9	16	Ret									0	NC
1977	Hesketh Racing	Hesketh 308E	Ford Cosworth DFV 3.0 V8	G	Héctor Rebaque							DNQ	DNQ	DNQ		Ret	DNQ	DNQ					0	NC
1977	Hesketh Racing	Hesketh 308E	Ford Cosworth DFV 3.0 V8	G	Ian Ashley												DNQ	DNQ	DNQ	17	DNS		0	NC
1977	Kojima Engineering	Kojima KE009	Ford Cosworth DFV 3.0 V8	B	Noritake Takahara																	Ret	0	NC
1977	Heros Racing	Kojima KE009	Ford Cosworth DFV 3.0 V8	B	Kazuyoshi Hoshino																	11	0	NC
1977	LEC Refrigeration Racing	LEC CRP1	Ford Cosworth DFV 3.0 V8	G	David Purley					DNQ		13	14	Ret	DNPQ								0	NC
1977	HB Bewaking Alarm Systems	Boro 001	Ford Cosworth DFV 3.0 V8	G	Brian Henton													DSQ	DNQ				0	NC
1977	Jolly Club Switzerland	Apollon Fly	Ford Cosworth DFV 3.0 V8	G	Loris Kessel														DNQ				0	NC
1977	Brian McGuire	McGuire BM1	Ford Cosworth DFV 3.0 V8	G	Brian McGuire										DNPQ								0	NC

=== 1978 ===
(key)

Year	Entrant	Chassis	Engine	Tyres	Drivers	1	2	3	4	5	6	7	8	9	10	11	12	13	14	15	16	Points	WCC
1978	John Player Team Lotus	Lotus 78 79	Ford Cosworth DFV 3.0 V8	G		ARG	BRA	RSA	USW	MON	BEL	ESP	SWE	FRA	GBR	GER	AUT	NED	ITA	USA	CAN	86	1st
1978	John Player Team Lotus	Lotus 78 79	Ford Cosworth DFV 3.0 V8	G	Mario Andretti	1^{P}	4	7^{F}	2	11	1^{P}	1^{P}^{F}	Ret^{P}	1	Ret	1^{P}	Ret	1^{P}	6^{P}^{F}	Ret^{P}	10	86	1st
1978	John Player Team Lotus	Lotus 78 79	Ford Cosworth DFV 3.0 V8	G	Ronnie Peterson	5	Ret^{P}	1	4	Ret	2^{F}	2	3	2	Ret^{P}	Ret^{F}	1^{P}^{F}	2	Ret			86	1st
1978	John Player Team Lotus	Lotus 78 79	Ford Cosworth DFV 3.0 V8	G	Jean-Pierre Jarier															15^{F}	Ret^{P}	86	1st
1978	Team Rebaque	Lotus 78	Ford Cosworth DFV 3.0 V8	G	Héctor Rebaque	DNQ	Ret	10	DNPQ	DNPQ	DNPQ	Ret	12	DNQ	Ret	6	Ret	11	DNQ	Ret	DNQ	86	1st
1978	Elf Team Tyrrell	Tyrrell 008	Ford Cosworth DFV 3.0 V8	G	Didier Pironi	14	6	6	Ret	5	6	12	Ret	10	Ret	5	Ret	Ret	Ret	10	7	38	4th
1978	Elf Team Tyrrell	Tyrrell 008	Ford Cosworth DFV 3.0 V8	G	Patrick Depailler	3	Ret	2	3	1	Ret	Ret	Ret	Ret	4	Ret	2	Ret	11	Ret	5	38	4th
1978	Walter Wolf Racing	Wolf WR1 WR3 WR5 WR6	Ford Cosworth DFV 3.0 V8	G	Jody Scheckter	10	Ret	Ret	Ret	3	Ret	4	Ret	6	Ret	2	Ret	12	12	3	2	24	5th
1978	Walter Wolf Racing	Wolf WR1 WR3 WR5 WR6	Ford Cosworth DFV 3.0 V8	G	Bobby Rahal															12	Ret	24	5th
1978	Theodore Racing Hong Kong	Wolf WR3 WR4	Ford Cosworth DFV 3.0 V8	G	Keke Rosberg											12	NC	Ret	DNPQ			24	5th
1978	Fittipaldi Automotive	Fittipaldi F5A	Ford Cosworth DFV 3.0 V8	G	Emerson Fittipaldi	9	2	Ret	8	9	Ret	Ret	6	Ret	Ret	4	4	5	8	5	Ret	17	7th
1978	Marlboro Team McLaren	McLaren M26	Ford Cosworth DFV 3.0 V8	G	James Hunt	4	Ret	Ret	Ret	Ret	Ret	6	8	3	Ret	DSQ	Ret	10	Ret	7	Ret	15	8th
1978	Marlboro Team McLaren	McLaren M26	Ford Cosworth DFV 3.0 V8	G	Patrick Tambay	6	Ret	Ret	12	7		Ret	4	9	6	Ret	Ret	9	5	6	8	15	8th
1978	Marlboro Team McLaren	McLaren M26	Ford Cosworth DFV 3.0 V8	G	Bruno Giacomelli						8			Ret	7			Ret	14			15	8th
1978	Centro Asegurador F1	McLaren M23 M25	Ford Cosworth DFV 3.0 V8	G	Emilio de Villota							DNQ										15	8th
1978	Liggett Group / BS Fabrications	McLaren M23 M26	Ford Cosworth DFV 3.0 V8	G	Brett Lunger	13	Ret	11	DNQ	DNPQ	7	DNQ	DNQ	Ret	8	DNPQ	8	Ret	Ret			15	8th
1978	BS Fabrications	McLaren M23 M26	Ford Cosworth DFV 3.0 V8	G	Nelson Piquet												Ret	Ret	9			15	8th
1978	Melchester Racing	McLaren M23	Ford Cosworth DFV 3.0 V8	G	Tony Trimmer										DNQ							15	8th
1978	Williams Grand Prix Engineering	Williams FW06	Ford Cosworth DFV 3.0 V8	G	Alan Jones	Ret	11	4	7^{F}	Ret	10	8	Ret	5	Ret	Ret	Ret	Ret	13	2	9^{F}	11	9th
1978	Arrows Racing Team	Arrows FA1 A1	Ford Cosworth DFV 3.0 V8	G	Riccardo Patrese		10	Ret	6	6	Ret	Ret	2	8	Ret	9	Ret	Ret	Ret		4	11	10th
1978	Arrows Racing Team	Arrows FA1 A1	Ford Cosworth DFV 3.0 V8	G	Rolf Stommelen			9	9	Ret	Ret	14	14	15	DNQ	DSQ	DNPQ	DNPQ	DNPQ	16	DNQ	11	10th
1978	Shadow Racing Team	Shadow DN8 DN9	Ford Cosworth DFV 3.0 V8	G	Hans-Joachim Stuck	17	Ret	DNQ	DNS	Ret	Ret	Ret	11	11	5	Ret	Ret	Ret	Ret	Ret	Ret	6	11th
1978	Shadow Racing Team	Shadow DN8 DN9	Ford Cosworth DFV 3.0 V8	G	Clay Regazzoni	15	5	DNQ	10	DNQ	Ret	15	5	Ret	Ret	DNQ	NC	DNQ	NC	14	DNQ	6	11th
1978	Interscope Racing	Shadow DN9	Ford Cosworth DFV 3.0 V8	G	Danny Ongais				DNPQ									DNPQ				6	11th
1978	Durex Team Surtees	Surtees TS19 TS20	Ford Cosworth DFV 3.0 V8	G	Rupert Keegan	Ret	Ret	Ret	DNS	Ret	DNQ	11	DNQ	Ret	DNQ	DNQ	DNQ	DNS				1	13th
1978	Durex Team Surtees	Surtees TS19 TS20	Ford Cosworth DFV 3.0 V8	G	René Arnoux															9	Ret	1	13th
1978	Team Surtees	Surtees TS19 TS20	Ford Cosworth DFV 3.0 V8	G	Brian Henton												PO					1	13th
1978	Team Surtees	Surtees TS19 TS20	Ford Cosworth DFV 3.0 V8	G	Gimax														DNQ			1	13th
1978	Team Surtees	Surtees TS19 TS20	Ford Cosworth DFV 3.0 V8	G	Beppe Gabbiani															DNQ	DNQ	1	13th
1978	Beta Team Surtees	Surtees TS19 TS20	Ford Cosworth DFV 3.0 V8	G	Vittorio Brambilla	18	DNQ	12	Ret	DNQ	13	7	Ret	17	9	Ret	6	DSQ	Ret			1	13th
1978	Team Tissot Ensign	Ensign N177	Ford Cosworth DFV 3.0 V8	G	Danny Ongais	Ret	Ret															1	14th
1978	Team Tissot Ensign	Ensign N177	Ford Cosworth DFV 3.0 V8	G	Lamberto Leoni	Ret	DNS	DNQ	DNQ													1	14th
1978	Team Tissot Ensign	Ensign N177	Ford Cosworth DFV 3.0 V8	G	Jacky Ickx					Ret	12	Ret	DNQ									1	14th
1978	Team Tissot Ensign	Ensign N177	Ford Cosworth DFV 3.0 V8	G	Bernard de Dryver						DNP											1	14th
1978	Team Tissot Ensign	Ensign N177	Ford Cosworth DFV 3.0 V8	G	Derek Daly									DNQ	Ret		DSQ	Ret	10	8	6	1	14th
1978	Team Tissot Ensign	Ensign N177	Ford Cosworth DFV 3.0 V8	G	Nelson Piquet											Ret						1	14th
1978	Team Tissot Ensign	Ensign N177	Ford Cosworth DFV 3.0 V8	G	Brett Lunger															13		1	14th
1978	Sachs Racing	Ensign N177	Ford Cosworth DFV 3.0 V8	G	Harald Ertl											11	Ret	DNPQ	DNPQ			1	14th
1978	Mario Deliotti Racing	Ensign N175	Ford Cosworth DFV 3.0 V8	G	Geoff Lees										DNQ							1	14th
1978	ATS Racing Team	ATS HS1 D1	Ford Cosworth DFV 3.0 V8	G	Jochen Mass	11	7	Ret	Ret	DNQ	11	9	13	13	NC	Ret	DNQ	DNQ				0	NC
1978	ATS Racing Team	ATS HS1 D1	Ford Cosworth DFV 3.0 V8	G	Jean-Pierre Jarier	12	DNS	8	11	DNQ						DNQ						0	NC
1978	ATS Racing Team	ATS HS1 D1	Ford Cosworth DFV 3.0 V8	G	Alberto Colombo						DNQ	DNQ										0	NC
1978	ATS Racing Team	ATS HS1 D1	Ford Cosworth DFV 3.0 V8	G	Keke Rosberg								15	16	Ret					Ret	NC	0	NC
1978	ATS Racing Team	ATS HS1 D1	Ford Cosworth DFV 3.0 V8	G	Hans Binder											DNQ						0	NC
1978	ATS Racing Team	ATS HS1 D1	Ford Cosworth DFV 3.0 V8	G	Harald Ertl														DNQ			0	NC
1978	F&S Properties/ATS Racing Team	ATS HS1 D1	Ford Cosworth DFV 3.0 V8	G	Michael Bleekemolen													DNQ	DNQ	Ret	DNQ	0	NC
1978	Automobiles Martini	Martini MK23	Ford Cosworth DFV 3.0 V8	G	René Arnoux			DNQ		DNPQ	9			14		DNPQ	9	Ret				0	NC
1978	Team Merzario	Merzario A1	Ford Cosworth DFV 3.0 V8	G	Arturo Merzario	Ret	DNQ	Ret	Ret	DNPQ	DNPQ	DNQ	NC	DNQ	Ret	DNQ	DNQ	Ret	Ret	Ret	DNQ	0	NC
1978	Team Merzario	Merzario A1	Ford Cosworth DFV 3.0 V8	G	Alberto Colombo														DNPQ			0	NC
1978	Theodore Racing Hong Kong	Theodore TR1	Ford Cosworth DFV 3.0 V8	G	Eddie Cheever	DNQ	DNQ															0	NC
1978	Theodore Racing Hong Kong	Theodore TR1	Ford Cosworth DFV 3.0 V8	G	Keke Rosberg			Ret	DNPQ	DNPQ	DNQ	DNPQ										0	NC
1978	Olympus Cameras/Hesketh Racing	Hesketh 308E	Ford Cosworth DFV 3.0 V8	G	Divina Galica	DNQ	DNQ															0	NC
1978	Olympus Cameras/Hesketh Racing	Hesketh 308E	Ford Cosworth DFV 3.0 V8	G	Eddie Cheever			Ret														0	NC
1978	Olympus Cameras/Hesketh Racing	Hesketh 308E	Ford Cosworth DFV 3.0 V8	G	Derek Daly				DNPQ	DNPQ	DNQ											0	NC
1978	Patrick Nève	March 781S	Ford Cosworth DFV 3.0 V8	G	Patrick Nève						DNP											0	NC

=== 1979 ===
(key)

Year	Entrant	Chassis	Engine	Tyres	Drivers	1	2	3	4	5	6	7	8	9	10	11	12	13	14	15	Points	WCC
1979	Albiad-Saudia Racing Team	Williams FW06 FW07	Ford Cosworth DFV 3.0 V8	G		ARG	BRA	RSA	USW	ESP	BEL	MON	FRA	GBR	GER	AUT	NED	ITA	CAN	USA	75	2nd
1979	Albiad-Saudia Racing Team	Williams FW06 FW07	Ford Cosworth DFV 3.0 V8	G	Alan Jones	9	Ret	Ret	3	Ret	Ret	Ret	4	Ret^{P}	1	1	1	9	1^{P}^{F}	Ret^{P}	75	2nd
1979	Albiad-Saudia Racing Team	Williams FW06 FW07	Ford Cosworth DFV 3.0 V8	G	Clay Regazzoni	10	15	9	Ret	Ret	Ret	2	6	1^{F}	2	5	Ret	3^{F}	3	Ret	75	2nd
1979	Ligier Gitanes	Ligier JS11	Ford Cosworth DFV 3.0 V8	G	Patrick Depailler	4	2	Ret	5	1	Ret	(5)^{F}									61	3rd
1979	Ligier Gitanes	Ligier JS11	Ford Cosworth DFV 3.0 V8	G	Jacky Ickx								Ret	6	Ret	Ret	5	Ret	Ret	Ret	61	3rd
1979	Ligier Gitanes	Ligier JS11	Ford Cosworth DFV 3.0 V8	G	Jacques Laffite	1^{P}^{F}	1^{P}^{F}	Ret	Ret	Ret^{P}	2^{P}	Ret	8	Ret	3	3	3	Ret	Ret	Ret	61	3rd
1979	Martini Racing Team Lotus	Lotus 79 80	Ford Cosworth DFV 3.0 V8	G	Mario Andretti	5	Ret	4	4	3	Ret	Ret	Ret	Ret	Ret	Ret	Ret	5	10	Ret	39	4th
1979	Martini Racing Team Lotus	Lotus 79 80	Ford Cosworth DFV 3.0 V8	G	Carlos Reutemann	2	3	5	Ret	2	4	3	13	8	Ret	Ret	Ret	7	Ret	Ret	39	4th

Notes

- * – Started illegally.
- ^{‡} – Half points awarded as less than 75% of the race distance was completed.

=== 2000s ===
(key)

Year	Entrant	Chassis	Engine	Tyres	Drivers	1	2	3	4	5	6	7	8	9	10	11	12	13	14	15	16	17	18	19	Points	WCC
2000	Jaguar Racing F1 Team	Jaguar R1	Cosworth CR-2 3.0 V10	B		AUS	BRA	SMR	GBR	ESP	EUR	MON	CAN	FRA	AUT	GER	HUN	BEL	ITA	USA	JPN	MAL			4	9th
2000	Jaguar Racing F1 Team	Jaguar R1	Cosworth CR-2 3.0 V10	B	(United Kingdom) Eddie Irvine	Ret	Ret	7	13	11	Ret	4	13	13	PO	10	8	10	Ret	7	8	6			4	9th
2000	Jaguar Racing F1 Team	Jaguar R1	Cosworth CR-2 3.0 V10	B	(Brazil) Luciano Burti										11										4	9th
2000	Jaguar Racing F1 Team	Jaguar R1	Cosworth CR-2 3.0 V10	B	(United Kingdom) Johnny Herbert	Ret	Ret	10	12	13	11^{†}	9	Ret	Ret	7	Ret	Ret	8	Ret	11	7	Ret			4	9th
2001	Jaguar Racing F1 Team	Jaguar R2	Cosworth CR-3 3.0 V10	M		AUS	MAL	BRA	SMR	ESP	AUT	MON	CAN	EUR	FRA	GBR	GER	HUN	BEL	ITA	USA	JPN			9	8th
2001	Jaguar Racing F1 Team	Jaguar R2	Cosworth CR-3 3.0 V10	M	(United Kingdom) Eddie Irvine	11	Ret	Ret	Ret	Ret	7	3	Ret	7	Ret	9	Ret	Ret	DNS	Ret	5	Ret			9	8th
2001	Jaguar Racing F1 Team	Jaguar R2	Cosworth CR-3 3.0 V10	M	(Brazil) Luciano Burti	8	10	Ret	11																9	8th
2001	Jaguar Racing F1 Team	Jaguar R2	Cosworth CR-3 3.0 V10	M	(Spain) Pedro de la Rosa					Ret	Ret	Ret	6	8	14	12	Ret	11	Ret	5	12	Ret			9	8th
2002	Jaguar Racing F1 Team	Jaguar R3 Jaguar R3B	Cosworth CR-3 3.0 V10 Cosworth CR-4 3.0 V10	M		AUS	MAL	BRA	SMR	ESP	AUT	MON	CAN	EUR	GBR	FRA	GER	HUN	BEL	ITA	USA	JPN			8	7th
2002	Jaguar Racing F1 Team	Jaguar R3 Jaguar R3B	Cosworth CR-3 3.0 V10 Cosworth CR-4 3.0 V10	M	(United Kingdom) Eddie Irvine	4	Ret	7	Ret	Ret	Ret	9	Ret	Ret	Ret	Ret	Ret	Ret	6	3	10	9			8	7th
2002	Jaguar Racing F1 Team	Jaguar R3 Jaguar R3B	Cosworth CR-3 3.0 V10 Cosworth CR-4 3.0 V10	M	(Spain) Pedro de la Rosa	8	10	8	Ret	Ret	Ret	10	Ret	11	11	9	Ret	13	Ret	Ret	Ret	Ret			8	7th
2002	Orange Arrows	Arrows A23	Cosworth CR-3 3.0 V10 Cosworth CR-4 3.0 V10	B	(Germany) Heinz-Harald Frentzen	DSQ	11	Ret	Ret	6	11	6	13	13	Ret	DNQ	Ret								2	11th
2002	Orange Arrows	Arrows A23	Cosworth CR-3 3.0 V10 Cosworth CR-4 3.0 V10	B	(Brazil) Enrique Bernoldi	DSQ	Ret	Ret	Ret	Ret	Ret	12	Ret	10	Ret	DNQ	Ret								2	11th
2003	Jaguar Racing F1 Team	Jaguar R4	Cosworth CR-5 3.0 V10	M		AUS	MAL	BRA	SMR	ESP	AUT	MON	CAN	EUR	FRA	GBR	GER	HUN	ITA	USA	JPN				18	7th
2003	Jaguar Racing F1 Team	Jaguar R4	Cosworth CR-5 3.0 V10	M	(Australia) Mark Webber	Ret	Ret	9^{†}	Ret	7	7	Ret	7	6	6	14	11^{†}	6	7	Ret	11				18	7th
2003	Jaguar Racing F1 Team	Jaguar R4	Cosworth CR-5 3.0 V10	M	(Brazil) Antônio Pizzonia	13^{†}	Ret	Ret	14	Ret	9	Ret	10^{†}	10	10	Ret									18	7th
2003	Jaguar Racing F1 Team	Jaguar R4	Cosworth CR-5 3.0 V10	M	(United Kingdom) Justin Wilson												Ret	Ret	Ret	8	13				18	7th
2003	B&H Jordan Ford	Jordan EJ13	Ford RS1 3.0 V10	B	(Italy) Giancarlo Fisichella	12^{†}	Ret	1	15^{†}	Ret	Ret	10	Ret	12	Ret	Ret	13^{†}	Ret	10	7	Ret				13	9th
2003	B&H Jordan Ford	Jordan EJ13	Ford RS1 3.0 V10	B	(Republic of Ireland) Ralph Firman	Ret	10	Ret	Ret	8	11	12	Ret	11	15	13	Ret			Ret	14				13	9th
2003	B&H Jordan Ford	Jordan EJ13	Ford RS1 3.0 V10	B	(Hungary) Zsolt Baumgartner													Ret	11						13	9th
2003	European Minardi F1 Team	Minardi PS03	Cosworth CR-3 3.0 V10	B	(United Kingdom) Justin Wilson	Ret	Ret	Ret	Ret	11	13	Ret	Ret	13	14	16									0	10th
2003	European Minardi F1 Team	Minardi PS03	Cosworth CR-3 3.0 V10	B	(Denmark) Nicolas Kiesa												12	13	12	11	16				0	10th
2003	European Minardi F1 Team	Minardi PS03	Cosworth CR-3 3.0 V10	B	(Netherlands) Jos Verstappen	11	13	Ret	Ret	12	Ret	Ret	9	14	16	15	Ret	12	Ret	10	15				0	10th
2004	Jaguar Racing F1 Team	Jaguar R5 Jaguar R5B	Cosworth CR-6 3.0 V10	M		AUS	MAL	BHR	SMR	ESP	MON	EUR	CAN	USA	FRA	GBR	GER	HUN	BEL	ITA	CHN	JPN	BRA		10	7th
2004	Jaguar Racing F1 Team	Jaguar R5 Jaguar R5B	Cosworth CR-6 3.0 V10	M	(Australia) Mark Webber	Ret	Ret	8	13	12	Ret	7	Ret	Ret	9	8	6	10	Ret	9	10	Ret	Ret		10	7th
2004	Jaguar Racing F1 Team	Jaguar R5 Jaguar R5B	Cosworth CR-6 3.0 V10	M	(Austria) Christian Klien	11	10	14	14	Ret	Ret	12	9	Ret	11	14	10	13	6	13	Ret	12	14		10	7th
2004	Jordan Ford	Jordan EJ14	Ford RS2 3.0 V10	B	(Germany) Nick Heidfeld	Ret	Ret	15	Ret	Ret	7	10	8	Ret	16	15	Ret	12	11	14	13	13	Ret		5	9th
2004	Jordan Ford	Jordan EJ14	Ford RS2 3.0 V10	B	(Italy) Giorgio Pantano	14	13	16	Ret	Ret	Ret	13		Ret	17	Ret	15	Ret	Ret	Ret					5	9th
2004	Jordan Ford	Jordan EJ14	Ford RS2 3.0 V10	B	(Germany) Timo Glock								7								15	15	15		5	9th
2004	Minardi F1 Team	Minardi PS04B	Cosworth CR-3L 3.0 V10	B	(Italy) Gianmaria Bruni	Ret	14	17	Ret	Ret	Ret	14	Ret	Ret	18^{†}	16	17	14	Ret	Ret	Ret	16	17		1	10th
2004	Minardi F1 Team	Minardi PS04B	Cosworth CR-3L 3.0 V10	B	(Hungary) Zsolt Baumgartner	Ret	16	Ret	15	Ret	9	15	10	8	Ret	Ret	16	15	Ret	15	16	Ret	16		1	10th
2005	Red Bull Racing	Red Bull RB1	Cosworth TJ2005 3.0 V10	M		AUS	MAL	BHR	SMR	ESP	MON	EUR	CAN	USA	FRA	GBR	GER	HUN	TUR	ITA	BEL	BRA	JPN	CHN	34	7th
2005	Red Bull Racing	Red Bull RB1	Cosworth TJ2005 3.0 V10	M	(United Kingdom) David Coulthard	4	6	8	11	8	Ret	4	7	DNS	10	13	7	Ret	7	15	Ret	Ret	6	9	34	7th
2005	Red Bull Racing	Red Bull RB1	Cosworth TJ2005 3.0 V10	M	(Austria) Christian Klien	7	8	DNS					8	DNS	Ret	15	9	Ret	8	13	9	9	9	5	34	7th
2005	Red Bull Racing	Red Bull RB1	Cosworth TJ2005 3.0 V10	M	(Italy) Vitantonio Liuzzi				8	Ret	Ret	9													34	7th
2005	Minardi F1 Team	Minardi PS04B Minardi PS05	Cosworth CR-3L 3.0 V10 Cosworth TJ2005 3.0 V10	B	(Austria) Patrick Friesacher	17	Ret	12	Ret	Ret	Ret	18	Ret	6	Ret	19									7	10th
2005	Minardi F1 Team	Minardi PS04B Minardi PS05	Cosworth CR-3L 3.0 V10 Cosworth TJ2005 3.0 V10	B	(Monaco) Robert Doornbos												18	Ret	13	18	13	Ret	14	14^{†}	7	10th
2005	Minardi F1 Team	Minardi PS04B Minardi PS05	Cosworth CR-3L 3.0 V10 Cosworth TJ2005 3.0 V10	B	(Netherlands) Christijan Albers	Ret	13	13	Ret	Ret	14	17	11	5	Ret	18	13	NC	Ret	19	12	14	16	16^{†}	7	10th
2006	Williams F1 Team	Williams FW28	Cosworth CA2006 2.4 V8	B		BHR	MAL	AUS	SMR	EUR	ESP	MON	GBR	CAN	USA	FRA	GER	HUN	TUR	ITA	CHN	JPN	BRA		11	8th
2006	Williams F1 Team	Williams FW28	Cosworth CA2006 2.4 V8	B	(Australia) Mark Webber	6	Ret	Ret	6	Ret	9	Ret	Ret	12	Ret	Ret	Ret	Ret	10	10	8	Ret	Ret		11	8th
2006	Williams F1 Team	Williams FW28	Cosworth CA2006 2.4 V8	B	(Germany) Nico Rosberg	7^{F}	Ret	Ret	11	7	11	Ret	9	Ret	9	14	Ret	Ret	Ret	Ret	11	10	Ret		11	8th
2006	Scuderia Toro Rosso	Toro Rosso STR1	Cosworth TJ2005 3.0 V10	M	(Italy) Vitantonio Liuzzi	11	11	Ret	14	Ret	15^{†}	10	13	13	8	13	10	Ret	Ret	14	10	14	13		1	9th
2006	Scuderia Toro Rosso	Toro Rosso STR1	Cosworth TJ2005 3.0 V10	M	(United States) Scott Speed	13	Ret	9	15	11	Ret	13	Ret	10	Ret	10	12	11	13	13	14	18^{†}	11		1	9th
2007–2009: Cosworth did not supply any engines in Formula One.

Notes

- ^{†} – Driver did not finish the Grand Prix, but was classified as he completed over 90% of the race distance.

=== 2010s ===
(key)

Year	Entrant	Chassis	Engine	Tyres	Drivers	1	2	3	4	5	6	7	8	9	10	11	12	13	14	15	16	17	18	19	20	Points	WCC
2010	AT&T Williams	Williams FW32	Cosworth CA2010 2.4 V8	B		BHR	AUS	MAL	CHN	ESP	MON	TUR	CAN	EUR	GBR	GER	HUN	BEL	ITA	SIN	JPN	KOR	BRA	ABU		69	6th
2010	AT&T Williams	Williams FW32	Cosworth CA2010 2.4 V8	B	(Brazil) Rubens Barrichello	10	8	12	12	9	Ret	14	14	4	5	12	10	Ret	10	6	9	7	14	12		69	6th
2010	AT&T Williams	Williams FW32	Cosworth CA2010 2.4 V8	B	(Germany) Nico Hülkenberg	14	Ret	10	15	16	Ret	17	13	Ret	10	13	6	14	7	10	Ret	10	8^{P}	16		69	6th
2010	Lotus Racing	Lotus T127	Cosworth CA2010 2.4 V8	B	(Italy) Jarno Trulli	17^{†}	DNS	17	Ret	17	15^{†}	Ret	Ret	21	16	Ret	15	19	Ret	Ret	13	Ret	19	21^{†}		0	10th
2010	Lotus Racing	Lotus T127	Cosworth CA2010 2.4 V8	B	(Finland) Heikki Kovalainen	15	13	NC	14	DNS	Ret	Ret	16	Ret	17	Ret	14	16	18	16^{†}	12	13	18	17		0	10th
2010	Hispania Racing F1 Team	Hispania F110	Cosworth CA2010 2.4 V8	B	(India) Karun Chandhok	Ret	14	15	17	Ret	14^{†}	20^{†}	18	18	19											0	11th
2010	Hispania Racing F1 Team	Hispania F110	Cosworth CA2010 2.4 V8	B	(Brazil) Bruno Senna	Ret	Ret	16	16	Ret	Ret	Ret	Ret	20		19	17	Ret	Ret	Ret	15	14	21	19		0	11th
2010	Hispania Racing F1 Team	Hispania F110	Cosworth CA2010 2.4 V8	B	(Japan) Sakon Yamamoto										20	Ret	19	20	19		16	15				0	11th
2010	Hispania Racing F1 Team	Hispania F110	Cosworth CA2010 2.4 V8	B	(Austria) Christian Klien															Ret			22	20		0	11th
2010	Virgin Racing	Virgin VR-01	Cosworth CA2010 2.4 V8	B	(Germany) Timo Glock	Ret	Ret	Ret	DNS	18	Ret	18	Ret	19	18	18	16	18	17	Ret	14	Ret	20	Ret		0	12th
2010	Virgin Racing	Virgin VR-01	Cosworth CA2010 2.4 V8	B	(Brazil) Lucas di Grassi	Ret	Ret	14	Ret	19	Ret	19	19	17	Ret	Ret	18	17	20^{†}	15	DNS	Ret	NC	18		0	12th
2011	AT&T Williams	Williams FW33	Cosworth CA2011 2.4 V8	P		AUS	MAL	CHN	TUR	ESP	MON	CAN	EUR	GBR	GER	HUN	BEL	ITA	SIN	JPN	KOR	IND	ABU	BRA		5	9th
2011	AT&T Williams	Williams FW33	Cosworth CA2011 2.4 V8	P	(Brazil) Rubens Barrichello	Ret	Ret	13	15	17	9	9	12	13	Ret	13	16	12	13	17	12	15	12	14		5	9th
2011	AT&T Williams	Williams FW33	Cosworth CA2011 2.4 V8	P	(Venezuela) Pastor Maldonado	Ret	Ret	18	17	15	18^{†}	Ret	18	14	14	16	10	11	11	14	Ret	Ret	14	Ret		5	9th
2011	Hispania Racing F1 Team	Hispania F111	Cosworth CA2011 2.4 V8	P	(India) Narain Karthikeyan	DNQ	Ret	23	21	21	17	17	24									17				0	11th
2011	Hispania Racing F1 Team	Hispania F111	Cosworth CA2011 2.4 V8	P	(Australia) Daniel Ricciardo									19	19	18	Ret	NC	19	22	19	18	Ret	20		0	11th
2011	Hispania Racing F1 Team	Hispania F111	Cosworth CA2011 2.4 V8	P	(Italy) Vitantonio Liuzzi	DNQ	Ret	22	22	Ret	16	13	23	18	Ret	20	19	Ret	20	23	21		20	Ret		0	11th
2011	Marussia Virgin Racing	Virgin MVR-02	Cosworth CA2011 2.4 V8	P	(Germany) Timo Glock	NC	16	21	DNS	19	Ret	15	21	16	17	17	18	15	Ret	20	18	Ret	19	Ret		0	12th
2011	Marussia Virgin Racing	Virgin MVR-02	Cosworth CA2011 2.4 V8	P	(Belgium) Jérôme d'Ambrosio	14	Ret	20	20	20	15	14	22	17	18	19	17	Ret	18	21	20	16	Ret	19		0	12th
2012	Marussia F1 Team	Marussia MR01	Cosworth CA2012 2.4 V8	P		AUS	MAL	CHN	BHR	ESP	MON	CAN	EUR	GBR	GER	HUN	BEL	ITA	SIN	JPN	KOR	IND	ABU	USA	BRA	0	11th
2012	Marussia F1 Team	Marussia MR01	Cosworth CA2012 2.4 V8	P	(Germany) Timo Glock	14	17	19	19	18	14	Ret	DNS	18	22	21	15	17	12	16	18	20	14	19	16	0	11th
2012	Marussia F1 Team	Marussia MR01	Cosworth CA2012 2.4 V8	P	(France) Charles Pic	15^{†}	20	20	Ret	Ret	Ret	20	15	19	20	20	16	16	16	Ret	19	19	Ret	20	12	0	11th
2012	HRT Formula 1 Team	HRT F112	Cosworth CA2012 2.4 V8	P	(Spain) Pedro de la Rosa	DNQ	21	21	20	19	Ret	Ret	17	20	21	22	18	18	17	18	Ret	Ret	17	21	17	0	12th
2012	HRT Formula 1 Team	HRT F112	Cosworth CA2012 2.4 V8	P	(India) Narain Karthikeyan	DNQ	22	22	21	Ret	15	Ret	18	21	23	Ret	Ret	19	Ret	Ret	20	21	Ret	22	18	0	12th
2013	Marussia F1 Team	Marussia MR02	Cosworth CA2013 2.4 V8	P		AUS	MAL	CHN	BHR	ESP	MON	CAN	GBR	GER	HUN	BEL	ITA	SIN	KOR	JPN	IND	ABU	USA	BRA		0	10th
2013	Marussia F1 Team	Marussia MR02	Cosworth CA2013 2.4 V8	P	(France) Jules Bianchi	15	13	15	19	18	Ret	17	16	Ret	16	18	19	18	16	Ret	18	20	18	17		0	10th
2013	Marussia F1 Team	Marussia MR02	Cosworth CA2013 2.4 V8	P	(United Kingdom) Max Chilton	17	16	17	20	19	14	19	17	19	17	19	20	17	17	19	17	21	21	19		0	10th
