= Alex Blignaut =

South African racing driver (1932–2001)

- Born: 30 November 1932; Johannesburg, South Africa
- Died: 15 January 2001 (aged 68); Honeydew, Johannesburg, South Africa

Formula One World Championship career
- Nationality: (South Africa) South African
- Active years: 1965
- Team: privateer Cooper
- Entries: 1 (0 starts)
- Championships: 0
- Wins: 0
- Podiums: 0
- Career points: 0
- Pole positions: 0
- Fastest laps: 0
- First entry: 1965 South African Grand Prix

Alex Blignaut Racing Team
- Full name: (South Africa) Blignaut Lucky Strike Racing; Blignaut Embassy Racing
- Base: South Africa
- Founder(s): Alex Blignaut
- Noted staff: Alex Blignaut
- Noted drivers: (South Africa) Eddie Keizan

Formula One World Championship career
- First entry: 1973 South African Grand Prix
- Races entered: 2
- Constructors: Tyrrell
- Drivers' Championships: 0
- Race victories: 0
- Pole positions: 0
- Fastest laps: 0
- Final entry: 1974 South African Grand Prix

Alex Blignaut (30 November 1932 – 15 January 2001) was a racing driver and motor racing team owner from South Africa.

== Career ==
Blignaut raced locally in South Africa for many years and made two appearances in the Formula One Rand Grand Prix under the "Team Valencia" banner, in 1963 and 1964, finishing 12th on both occasions. He also entered the 1965 South African Grand Prix, a World Championship event, but withdrew before the meeting took place.

He later turned to team ownership, setting up the "Alex Blignaut Racing Team" and entering cars in the South African Formula One Championship throughout the late 1960s and early 1970s, earning many race wins. Among the drivers who competed for Blignaut were Eddie Keizan and Ian Scheckter. Keizan also drove Blignaut's Tyrrell 004 in the World Championship South African Grands Prix in 1973 and 1974.

Blignaut was later secretary of SAMRaC (South African Motor Racing Club), the club which organised the South African Grand Prix at Kyalami. He died in 2001 after an accident on his farm, when he electrocuted himself while repairing a piece of machinery.

== Results ==
=== Complete Formula One World Championship results ===
(key)

Yr	Entrant	Chassis	Engine	1	2	3	4	5	6	7	8	9	10	WDC	Points
1965	Team Valencia	Cooper Special	Climax Straight-4	RSA; WD	MON	BEL	FRA	GBR	NED	GER	ITA	USA	MEX	NC	0

=== Non-Championship Formula One results ===
(key)

Year	Entrant	Chassis	Engine	1	2	3	4	5	6	7	8	9	10	11	12	13	14
1963	Team Valencia	Cooper T53	Climax Straight-4	LOM	GLV	PAU	IMO	SYR	AIN	INT	ROM	SOL	KAN	MED	AUT	OUL	RAN; 12
1964	Team Valencia	LDS	Alfa Romeo Straight-4	DMT	NWT	SYR	AIN	INT	SOL	MED	RAN; 12						
