= Eddie Keizan =

South African racing driver (1944–2016)

- Born: 12 September 1944; Johannesburg, South Africa
- Died: 21 May 2016 (aged 71); Johannesburg, South Africa

Formula One World Championship career
- Nationality: (South Africa) South African
- Active years: 1973–1975
- Team(s): non-works Tyrrell, non-works Lotus
- Entries: 3
- Championships: 0
- Wins: 0
- Podiums: 0
- Career points: 0
- Pole positions: 0
- Fastest laps: 0
- First entry: 1973 South African Grand Prix
- Last entry: 1975 South African Grand Prix

Eddie Keizan (12 September 1944 – 21 May 2016) was a South African racing driver. He raced in three World Championship Formula One Grands Prix during the 1970s, debuting on 3 March 1973. He scored no championship points.

Keizan was born in Johannesburg. After success in South Africa driving saloons and sports cars, Keizan moved into Formula 5000 where he won the national championship. He participated in the South African Formula One championships as well, including three World Championship South African Grands Prix, twice with a Tyrrell owned by Alex Blignaut – this car had been previously raced by Jackie Stewart. For the third of his three attempts, Keizan drove a Lotus 72, entered by local outfit Team Gunston.

After Formula One, Keizan raced in touring cars and also concentrated on his business interests. These included owning and leading a successful alloy wheels company, which was eventually rebranded into major tyre retail chain Tiger Wheel & Tyre.

== Complete Formula One World Championship results ==
(key)

| Year | Entrant | Chassis | Engine | 1 | 2 | 3 | 4 | 5 | 6 | 7 | 8 | 9 | 10 | 11 | 12 | 13 | 14 | 15 | WDC | Points |
|---|---|---|---|---|---|---|---|---|---|---|---|---|---|---|---|---|---|---|---|---|
| 1973 | Blignaut Lucky Strike Racing | Tyrrell 004 | Cosworth DFV V8 | ARG | BRA | RSA; NC | ESP | BEL | MON | SWE | FRA | GBR | NED | GER | AUT | ITA | CAN | USA | NC | 0 |
| 1974 | Blignaut Embassy Racing | Tyrrell 004 | Cosworth DFV V8 | ARG | BRA | RSA; 14 | ESP | BEL | MON | SWE | NED | FRA | GBR | GER | AUT | ITA | CAN | USA | NC | 0 |
| 1975 | Team Gunston | Lotus 72 | Cosworth DFV V8 | ARG | BRA | RSA; 13 | ESP | MON | BEL | SWE | NED | FRA | GBR | GER | AUT | ITA | USA | | NC | 0 |
