= 1974 South African Grand Prix =

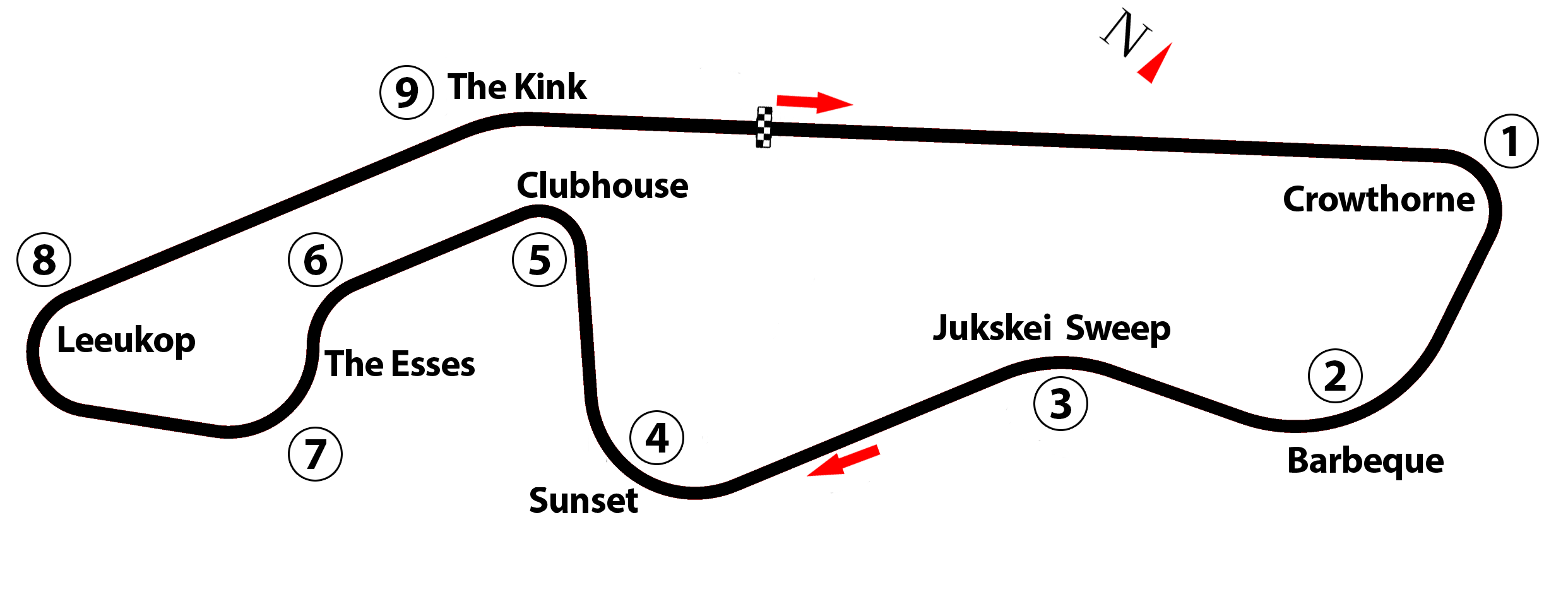
- Kyalami Circuit

Race details
- Date: 30 March 1974
- Official name: XX Lucky Strike Grand Prix of South Africa
- Location: Midrand, Transvaal Province, South Africa
- Course: Permanent racing facility
- Course length: 4.104 km (2.550 miles)
- Distance: 78 laps, 320.112 km (198.908 miles)

Pole position
Driver	(Austria) Niki Lauda	Ferrari
- Time: 1:16.58

Fastest lap
Driver	(Argentina) Carlos Reutemann	Brabham-Ford
- Time: 1:18.16 on lap 58

Podium
First	(Argentina) Carlos Reutemann	Brabham-Ford
Second	(France) Jean-Pierre Beltoise	BRM
Third	(United Kingdom) Mike Hailwood	McLaren-Ford

The 1974 South African Grand Prix (formally the XX Lucky Strike Grand Prix of South Africa) was a Formula One motor race held at Kyalami on 30 March 1974. It was race 3 of 15 in both the 1974 World Championship of Drivers and the 1974 International Cup for Formula One Manufacturers. This was Carlos Reutemann's first win, the first for an Argentinian driver since Juan Manuel Fangio won the 1957 German Grand Prix, and Brabham's first since the 1970 South African Grand Prix.

== Pre race notes, practice, and qualifying ==
It was initially uncertain that the South African Grand Prix would go ahead due to the 1973 oil crisis, but it did so, albeit at the end of March rather than at the start of the month. Lotus stunned the paddock with an innovative car which used four pedals and an electric clutch.

However, practice was overshadowed by an accident which killed Peter Revson. While driving his Shadow-Ford in a test session before the race, Revson suffered a front suspension failure on the outside of Barbecue Bend and crashed heavily into the Armco barrier, the car bursting into flames. Revson died instantly, and the Shadow team withdrew from the race. Niki Lauda took pole by a fraction of a second from Carlos Pace.

== Race summary ==
The two Lotus cars of Ronnie Peterson and Jacky Ickx tangled shortly after the start with the incident also involving Jochen Mass and Henri Pescarolo whilst Tom Belsø's race lasted no more than a few hundred yards due to clutch failure. Lauda led a train of cars consisting of Carlos Reutemann, Clay Regazzoni, Jody Scheckter and James Hunt, whose Hesketh was suffering vibration problems.

Mike Hailwood caught and passed Scheckter when he missed a gear, and then passed Reutemann on lap 9. On lap 75, nearly at the finish, Lauda was forced to retire with ignition problems and low oil pressure, handing the lead to Reutemann. Jean-Pierre Beltoise fought his way up through the field to 2nd, holding off a determined challenge from Hailwood who took the final podium place. Beltoise's 2nd place would turn out to be the last podium finish for a BRM.

== Classification ==
=== Qualifying ===
Pos.	Driver	Constructor	Time/Gap
1	(Austria) Niki Lauda	Ferrari	1:16.58
2	(Brazil) Carlos Pace	Surtees–Ford	+0.05
3	(Italy) Arturo Merzario	FWRC–Ford	+0.21
4	(Argentina) Carlos Reutemann	Brabham–Ford	+0.22
5	(Brazil) Emerson Fittipaldi	McLaren–Ford	+0.24
6	(Switzerland) Clay Regazzoni	Ferrari	+0.27
7	(West Germany) Hans-Joachim Stuck	March–Ford	+0.40
8	(South Africa) Jody Scheckter	Tyrrell–Ford	+0.41
9	(New Zealand) Denny Hulme	McLaren–Ford	+0.53
10	(Belgium) Jacky Ickx	Lotus–Ford	+0.60
11	(France) Jean-Pierre Beltoise	BRM	+0.76
12	(United Kingdom) Mike Hailwood	McLaren–Ford	+0.76
13	(United Kingdom) James Hunt	Hesketh–Ford	+0.83
14	(United Kingdom) John Watson	Brabham–Ford	+1.03
15	(France) Patrick Depailler	Tyrrell–Ford	+1.17
16	(Sweden) Ronnie Peterson	Lotus–Ford	+1.42
17	(West Germany) Jochen Mass	Surtees–Ford	+1.65
18	(United Kingdom) Graham Hill	Lola–Ford	+1.67
19	(Italy) Vittorio Brambilla	March–Ford	+1.71
20	(South Africa) David Charlton	McLaren–Ford	+1.79
21	(France) Henri Pescarolo	BRM	+1.81
22	(South Africa) Ian Scheckter	Lotus–Ford	+1.98
23	(United Kingdom) Richard Robarts	Brabham–Ford	+2.02
24	(South Africa) Eddie Keizan	Tyrrell–Ford	+2.42
25	(France) François Migault	BRM	+2.56
26	(South Africa) Paddy Driver	Lotus–Ford	+2.91
27	(Denmark) Tom Belsø	FWRC–Ford	+3.22

=== Race ===
Pos	No	Driver	Constructor	Laps	Time/Retired	Grid	Points
1	7	(Argentina) Carlos Reutemann	Brabham-Ford	78	1:42:40.96	4	9
2	14	(France) Jean-Pierre Beltoise	BRM	78	+ 33.94	11	6
3	33	(United Kingdom) Mike Hailwood	McLaren-Ford	78	+ 42.16	12	4
4	4	(France) Patrick Depailler	Tyrrell-Ford	78	+ 44.19	15	3
5	9	(West Germany) Hans Joachim Stuck	March-Ford	78	+ 46.23	7	2
6	20	(Italy) Arturo Merzario	Iso-Marlboro-Ford	78	+ 56.04	3	1
7	5	(Brazil) Emerson Fittipaldi	McLaren-Ford	78	+ 1:08.39	5	
8	3	(South Africa) Jody Scheckter	Tyrrell-Ford	78	+ 1:10.54	8	
9	6	(New Zealand) Denny Hulme	McLaren-Ford	77	+ 1 Lap	9	
10	10	(Italy) Vittorio Brambilla	March-Ford	77	+ 1 Lap	19	
11	18	(Brazil) Carlos Pace	Surtees-Ford	77	+ 1 Lap	2	
12	26	(United Kingdom) Graham Hill	Lola-Ford	77	+ 1 Lap	18	
13	29	(South Africa) Ian Scheckter	Lotus-Ford	76	+ 2 Laps	22	
14	32	(South Africa) Eddie Keizan	Tyrrell-Ford	76	+ 2 Laps	24	
15	37	(France) François Migault	BRM	75	+ 3 Laps	25	
16	12	(Austria) Niki Lauda	Ferrari	74	Ignition	1	
17	8	(United Kingdom) Richard Robarts	Brabham-Ford	74	+ 4 Laps	23	
18	15	(France) Henri Pescarolo	BRM	72	+ 6 Laps	21	
19	23	(South Africa) Dave Charlton	McLaren-Ford	71	+ 7 Laps	20	
Ret	11	(Switzerland) Clay Regazzoni	Ferrari	65	Oil Pressure	6	
Ret	28	(United Kingdom) John Watson	Brabham-Ford	54	Fuel System	13	
Ret	2	(Belgium) Jacky Ickx	Lotus-Ford	31	Brakes	10	
Ret	24	(United Kingdom) James Hunt	Hesketh-Ford	13	Transmission	14	
Ret	19	(West Germany) Jochen Mass	Surtees-Ford	11	Suspension	17	
Ret	30	(South Africa) Paddy Driver	Lotus-Ford	6	Clutch	26	
Ret	1	(Sweden) Ronnie Peterson	Lotus-Ford	2	Collision	16	
Ret	21	(Denmark) Tom Belsø	Iso-Marlboro-Ford	0	Clutch	27	
WD	16	(United States) Peter Revson	Shadow-Ford		Fatal Accident		
WD	17	(France) Jean-Pierre Jarier	Shadow-Ford		Entry Withdrawn		
WD	22	(Liechtenstein) Rikky von Opel	Ensign-Ford				
WD	25	(South Africa) John McNicol	Lotus-Ford				
WD	27	(United Kingdom) Guy Edwards	Lola-Ford				

== Notes ==
- This was the Formula One World Championship debut for Italian driver Vittorio Brambilla and South African driver Ian Scheckter.
- This was the Formula One World Championship debut for British constructor Hesketh.

== Championship standings after the race ==
Drivers' Championship standings

	Pos	Driver	Points
	1	(Switzerland) Clay Regazzoni	10
9	2	(Argentina) Carlos Reutemann	9
1	3	(Brazil) Emerson Fittipaldi	9
1	4	(New Zealand) Denny Hulme	9
	5	(United Kingdom) Mike Hailwood	9

Constructors' Championship standings

	Pos	Constructor	Points
	1	(United Kingdom) McLaren-Ford	22
	2	(Italy) Ferrari	12
4	3	(United Kingdom) Brabham-Ford	9
1	4	(United Kingdom) BRM	8
2	5	(United Kingdom) Lotus-Ford	4

- Note: Only the top five positions are included for both sets of standings.

Previous race: 1974 Brazilian Grand Prix	FIA Formula One World Championship; 1974 season	Next race: 1974 Spanish Grand Prix
Previous race: 1973 South African Grand Prix	South African Grand Prix	Next race: 1975 South African Grand Prix
