= 1973 South African Grand Prix =

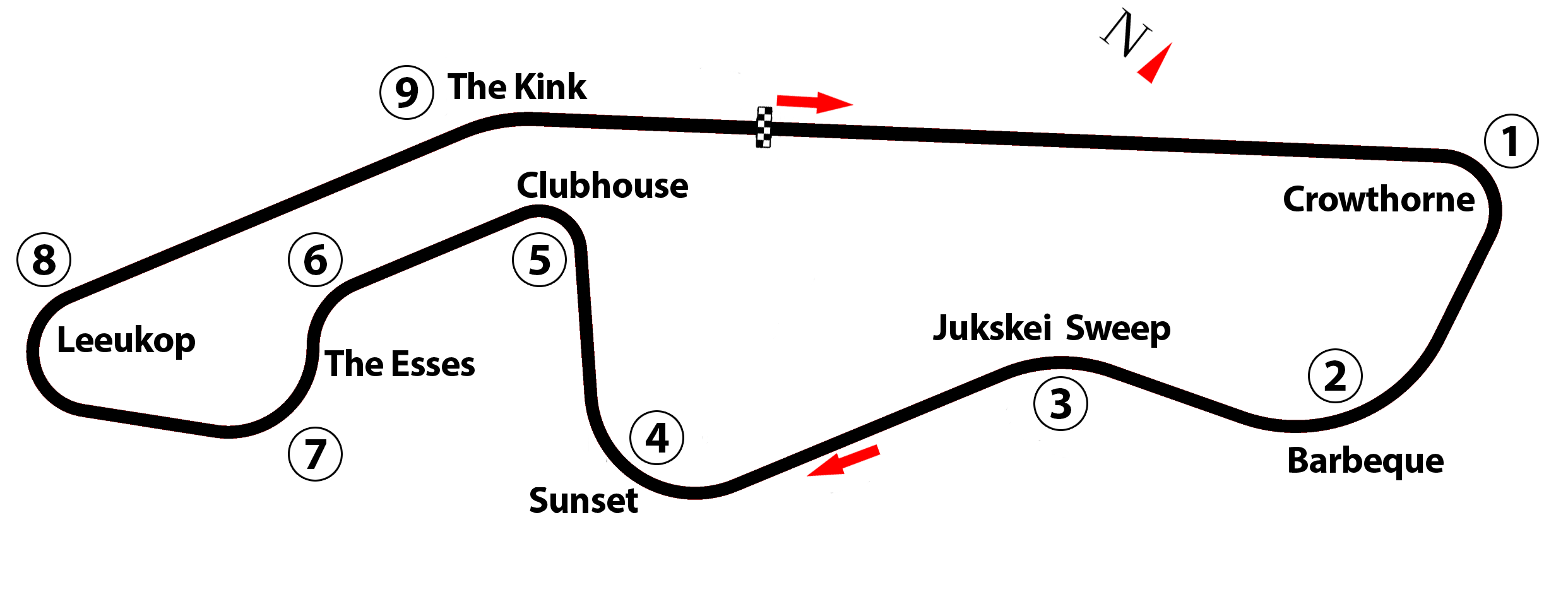
- The Kyalami Circuit (1967–1985)

Race details
- Date: 3 March 1973
- Official name: Seventh AA Grand Prix of South Africa
- Location: Kyalami, Midrand, Transvaal Province, South Africa
- Course: Permanent racing facility
- Course length: 4.104 km (2.550 miles)
- Distance: 79 laps, 324.216 km (201.458 miles)
- Weather: Sunny, Hot, Dry

Pole position
Driver	(New Zealand) Denny Hulme	McLaren-Ford
- Time: 1:16.28

Fastest lap
Driver	(Brazil) Emerson Fittipaldi	Lotus-Ford
- Time: 1:17.10 on lap 76

Podium
First	(United Kingdom) Jackie Stewart	Tyrrell-Ford
Second	(United States) Peter Revson	McLaren-Ford
Third	(Brazil) Emerson Fittipaldi	Lotus-Ford

The 1973 South African Grand Prix, formally titled the Seventh AA Grand Prix of South Africa, was a Formula One motor race held at Kyalami on 3 March 1973. It was race 3 of 15 in both the 1973 World Championship of Drivers and the 1973 International Cup for Formula One Manufacturers. The race was won by Jackie Stewart driving a Tyrrell. Denny Hulme's pole position was the only one of his Formula One World Championship career.

This race marked Scuderia Ferrari's 200th start in a World Championship event as a team.

== Accident ==
Mike Hailwood was recognised for bravery when he went to pull Clay Regazzoni from his burning car after the two collided on the third lap of the race. Hailwood's driving suit caught fire, but after being extinguished by a fire marshal he returned to help rescue Regazzoni, an act for which he was awarded the George Medal.

== Classification ==
=== Qualifying ===
Pos	No	Driver	Constructor	Time/Gap
1	5	(New Zealand) Denny Hulme	McLaren–Ford	1:16.28
2	1	(Brazil) Emerson Fittipaldi	Lotus–Ford	+0.13
3	7	(South Africa) Jody Scheckter	McLaren–Ford	+0.15
4	2	(Sweden) Ronnie Peterson	Lotus–Ford	+0.16
5	15	(Switzerland) Clay Regazzoni	BRM	+0.19
6	6	(United States) Peter Revson	McLaren–Ford	+0.44
7	16	(France) Jean-Pierre Beltoise	BRM	+0.56
8	18	(Argentina) Carlos Reutemann	Brabham–Ford	+0.66
9	11	(Brazil) Carlos Pace	Surtees–Ford	+0.78
10	17	(Austria) Niki Lauda	BRM	+0.86
11	8	(Belgium) Jacky Ickx	Ferrari	+0.88
12	10	(United Kingdom) Mike Hailwood	Surtees–Ford	+0.89
13	25	(South Africa) Dave Charlton	Lotus–Ford	+0.90
14	22	(United Kingdom) Jackie Oliver	Shadow–Ford	+1.36
15	9	(Italy) Arturo Merzario	Ferrari	+1.36
16	3	(United Kingdom) Jackie Stewart	Tyrrell–Ford	+1.37
17	19	(Brazil) Wilson Fittipaldi	Brabham–Ford	+1.67
18	14	(France) Jean-Pierre Jarier	March–Ford	+1.70
19	21	(New Zealand) Howden Ganley	Williams–Ford	+1.79
20	12	(Italy) Andrea de Adamich	Surtees–Ford	+2.38
21	23	(United States) George Follmer	Shadow–Ford	+2.54
22	26	(South Africa) Eddie Keizan	Tyrrell–Ford	+2.64
23	24	(United Kingdom) Mike Beuttler	March–Ford	+4.09
24	20	(South Africa) Jackie Pretorius	Williams–Ford	+4.26
25	4	(France) François Cevert	Tyrrell–Ford	No time

=== Race ===
Pos	No	Driver	Constructor	Laps	Time/Retired	Grid	Points
1	3	(United Kingdom) Jackie Stewart	Tyrrell-Ford	79	1:43:11.07	16	9
2	6	(United States) Peter Revson	McLaren-Ford	79	+ 24.55	6	6
3	1	(Brazil) Emerson Fittipaldi	Lotus-Ford	79	+ 25.06	2	4
4	9	(Italy) Arturo Merzario	Ferrari	78	+ 1 Lap	15	3
5	5	(New Zealand) Denny Hulme	McLaren-Ford	77	+ 2 Laps	1	2
6	23	(United States) George Follmer	Shadow-Ford	77	+ 2 Laps	21	1
7	18	(Argentina) Carlos Reutemann	Brabham-Ford	77	+ 2 Laps	8	
8	12	(Italy) Andrea de Adamich	Surtees-Ford	77	+ 2 Laps	20	
9	7	(South Africa) Jody Scheckter	McLaren-Ford	75	Engine	3	
10	21	(New Zealand) Howden Ganley	Iso-Marlboro-Ford	73	+ 6 Laps	19	
11	2	(Sweden) Ronnie Peterson	Lotus-Ford	73	+ 6 Laps	4	
Ret	11	(Brazil) Carlos Pace	Surtees-Ford	69	Accident	9	
NC	26	(South Africa) Eddie Keizan	Tyrrell-Ford	67	+ 12 Laps	22	
NC	14	(France) Jean-Pierre Jarier	March-Ford	66	+ 13 Laps	18	
NC	4	(France) François Cevert	Tyrrell-Ford	66	+ 13 Laps	25	
NC	24	(United Kingdom) Mike Beuttler	March-Ford	65	+ 14 Laps	23	
Ret	19	(Brazil) Wilson Fittipaldi	Brabham-Ford	52	Gearbox	17	
Ret	20	(South Africa) Jackie Pretorius	Iso-Marlboro-Ford	35	Overheating	24	
Ret	17	(Austria) Niki Lauda	BRM	26	Engine	10	
Ret	22	(United Kingdom) Jackie Oliver	Shadow-Ford	14	Engine	14	
Ret	16	(France) Jean-Pierre Beltoise	BRM	4	Clutch	7	
Ret	25	(South Africa) Dave Charlton	Lotus-Ford	3	Accident	13	
Ret	15	(Switzerland) Clay Regazzoni	BRM	2	Accident	5	
Ret	8	(Belgium) Jacky Ickx	Ferrari	2	Accident	11	
Ret	10	(United Kingdom) Mike Hailwood	Surtees-Ford	2	Accident	12	

== Notes ==
- This was the Formula One World Championship debut for South African driver Eddie Keizan and American driver George Follmer.
- This was the 200th Formula One Grand Prix start for a Ferrari. In those 200 races, Ferrari had won 49 Grands Prix, achieved 183 podium finishes, 60 pole positions, 57 fastest laps, 18 Grand Slams, and won 6 Driver's and 2 Constructor's World Championships.
- This was the Formula One World Championship debut for American-British constructor Shadow.

== Championship standings after the race ==
Drivers' Championship standings

	Pos	Driver	Points
	1	(Brazil) Emerson Fittipaldi	22
	2	(United Kingdom) Jackie Stewart	19
1	3	(New Zealand) Denny Hulme	8
6	4	(United States) Peter Revson	6
2	5	(France) François Cevert	6

Constructors' Championship standings

	Pos	Constructor	Points
	1	(United Kingdom) Lotus-Ford	22
	2	(United Kingdom) Tyrrell-Ford	21
	3	(United Kingdom) McLaren-Ford	12
	4	(Italy) Ferrari	9
1	5	(United Kingdom) Brabham-Ford	1

- Note: Only the top five positions are included for both sets of standings.

Previous race: 1973 Brazilian Grand Prix	FIA Formula One World Championship; 1973 season	Next race: 1973 Spanish Grand Prix
Previous race: 1972 South African Grand Prix	South African Grand Prix	Next race: 1974 South African Grand Prix
