= Lombardi (surname) =

Lombardi is an Italian surname, often held by the descendants of migrants from Lombardy and Northern Italy.

- Alberto Lombardi (1893–1975), Italian equestrian
- Alessia Lombardi (born 1976), Italian tennis player
- Alessandro Lombardi (born 2000), Italian footballer
- Armando Lombardi (1905–1964), Italian archbishop and Vatican diplomat
- Bob Lombardi (1938–2021), American football coach, father of Tony
- Carlo Francis Lombardi (1897–1983), Italian aviator
- Casimir Lombardi (1901–1974), French racing cyclist
- Claudio Lombardi (1942–2025), Italian Formula One engineer
- Clyde Lombardi (1922–c. 1975), American jazz double bassist
- Daniele Lombardi (1946–2018), Italian composer and pianist
- David Lombardi (born 1988), American sports journalist
- Dean Lombardi (born 1958), American hockey manager
- Ernie Lombardi (1908–1977), American baseball player
- Federica Lombardi (born 1989), Italian operatic soprano
- Federico Lombardi (born 1942), Italian Catholic priest
- Filippo Lombardi (politician) (born 1956), Swiss politician
- Filippo Lombardi (footballer) (born 1990), Italian goalkeeper
- Gennaro Lombardi (fl. 20th century), Italian-American Pizza pioneer
- Gianfranco Lombardi (1941–2021), Italian basketball player
- Giannina Arangi-Lombardi (1891–1951), Italian opera soprano
- Giovanni Lombardi (cyclist) (born 1969), Italian racing cyclist
- Guido Lombardi (born 1949), Peruvian journalist, lawyer, and politician
- Gustavo Lombardi (born 1975), Argentine footballer
- Hernán Lombardi (born 1960), Argentine politician
- Joe Lombardi (born 1971), American football coach and player, grandson of Vince
- John V. Lombardi (born 1942), American professor and historian
- Johnny Lombardi (1915–2002), Canadian broadcaster
- Julian Lombardi (born 1956), American computer scientist and educator
- Lella Lombardi (1941–1992), Italian Formula One driver
- Leon Lombardi (born 1949), American politician
- Linda Lombardi (born 1961), American author and linguist
- Louis Lombardi (born 1968), American actor
- Luca Lombardi (composer) (born 1945), Italian composer
- Luca Lombardi (footballer) (born 2002), Italian footballer
- Mariano Lombardi (born 1968), Argentine rugby player
- Mark Lombardi (1955–2000), American abstract painter
- Matthew Lombardi (born 1982), Canadian hockey player
- Maurizio Lombardi (born 1973), Italian actor and playwright
- Michael Lombardi (disambiguation)
  - Michael Lombardi (American football) (born 1959), American football executive and sports commentator, father of Mick
  - Michael Lombardi (entrepreneur) (born 1964), Canadian entrepreneur
  - Michael Lombardi (actor) (born 1976), American actor
- Mick Lombardi (born 1988), American football coach, son of Michael
- Miguel Lombardi (born 1964), Brazilian politician
- Pietro Lombardi (disambiguation)
  - Pietro Lombardi (architect) (1894–1984), Italian architect
  - Pietro Lombardi (wrestler) (1922–2011), Italian wrestler
  - Pietro Lombardi (singer) (born 1992), German singer
- Ricardo Caruso Lombardi (born 1962), Argentine football manager
- Rocky Lombardi (born 1998), American football player
- Rodolfo Lombardi (1908–1985), Italian cinematographer
- Sandro Lombardi, Swiss footballer
- Steve Lombardi (born 1961), American professional wrestler, better known as the Brooklyn Brawler
- Tony Lombardi (born 1962), American football coach, son of Bob and father of Rocky
- Vic Lombardi (1922–1997), American baseball pitcher
- Vince Lombardi (1913–1970), American football coach, or either of the two awards named for him:
  - Vince Lombardi Trophy: awarded to the winning team of the Super Bowl
  - Rotary Lombardi Award: annual award given to the best college football lineman or linebacker

== Fictional characters ==
- Tina Lombardi, a character played by Marion Cotillard in the 2004 film A Very Long Engagement
- Falco Lombardi, fictional character from Nintendo's Star Fox series of video games
- Lola Lombardi, fictional character form Rockstar's 2006 video game Bully.

== See also ==
- Lambardi
- Lombardi (disambiguation)
- Lombardo
- Lombards
- Longobardi (disambiguation)
- Lombard (disambiguation)
