= March Grand Prix results =

Formula 1 team results

The table below details the complete World Championship Grand Prix results for the March Formula One team. The second table includes results from privately owned March cars in World Championship Grands Prix.

== Complete Formula One World Championship results ==
=== Works team results ===
(key)

Year	Chassis	Engine(s)	Tyres	Drivers	1	2	3	4	5	6	7	8	9	10	11	12	13	14	15	16	17	Points	WCC
1970	March 701	Ford Cosworth DFV 3.0 V8	F		RSA	ESP	MON	BEL	NED	FRA	GBR	GER	AUT	ITA	CAN	USA	MEX					48 (Note: Points total includes points scored by private entries.)	3rd
1970	March 701	Ford Cosworth DFV 3.0 V8	F	(New Zealand) Chris Amon	Ret	Ret	Ret	2^{F}	Ret	2	5	Ret	8	7	3	5	4					48	3rd
1970	March 701	Ford Cosworth DFV 3.0 V8	F	(Switzerland) Jo Siffert	10	DNQ	8	7	Ret	Ret	Ret	8	9	Ret	Ret	9	Ret					48	3rd
1971	March 711	Ford Cosworth DFV 3.0 V8	F		RSA	ESP	MON	NED	FRA	GBR	GER	AUT	ITA	CAN	USA							33 (34)	4th
1971	March 711	Ford Cosworth DFV 3.0 V8	F	(Sweden) Ronnie Peterson	10	Ret	2	4		2	5	8	2	2	3							33 (34)	4th
1971	March 711	Ford Cosworth DFV 3.0 V8	F	(Spain) Alex Soler-Roig	Ret	Ret	DNQ	Ret	Ret													33 (34)	4th
1971	March 711	Ford Cosworth DFV 3.0 V8	F	(Italy) Nanni Galli					DNS	11			Ret	16	Ret							33 (34)	4th
1971	March 711	Ford Cosworth DFV 3.0 V8	F	(Austria) Niki Lauda								Ret										33 (34)	4th
1971	March 711	Ford Cosworth DFV 3.0 V8	F	(United Kingdom) Mike Beuttler										NC								33 (34)	4th
1971	March 711	Alfa Romeo T33 3.0 V8	F	(Italy) Andrea de Adamich	13	Ret			Ret	NC	Ret		Ret		11							0	NC
1971	March 711	Alfa Romeo T33 3.0 V8	F	(Italy) Nanni Galli			DNQ	Ret			12	12										0	NC
1971	March 711	Alfa Romeo T33 3.0 V8	F	(Sweden) Ronnie Peterson					Ret													0	NC
1972	March 721; March 721X; March 721G	Ford Cosworth DFV 3.0 V8	G		ARG	RSA	ESP	MON	BEL	FRA	GBR	GER	AUT	ITA	CAN	USA						15	6th
1972	March 721; March 721X; March 721G	Ford Cosworth DFV 3.0 V8	G	(Sweden) Ronnie Peterson	6	5	Ret	11	9	5	7	3	12	9	DSQ	4						15	6th
1972	March 721; March 721X; March 721G	Ford Cosworth DFV 3.0 V8	G	(Austria) Niki Lauda	11	7	Ret	16	12	Ret	9	Ret	10	13	DSQ	NC						15	6th
1973	March 721G; March 731	Ford Cosworth DFV 3.0 V8	G		ARG	BRA	RSA	ESP	BEL	MON	SWE	FRA	GBR	NED	GER	AUT	ITA	CAN	USA			14	5th
1973	March 721G; March 731	Ford Cosworth DFV 3.0 V8	G	(France) Jean-Pierre Jarier	Ret	Ret	NC		Ret	Ret	Ret	Ret				Ret		NC	11			14	5th
1973	March 721G; March 731	Ford Cosworth DFV 3.0 V8	G	(France) Henri Pescarolo				8														14	5th
1973	March 721G; March 731	Ford Cosworth DFV 3.0 V8	G	(United Kingdom) Roger Williamson									Ret	Ret								14	5th
1974	March 741	Ford Cosworth DFV 3.0 V8	G		ARG	BRA	RSA	ESP	BEL	MON	SWE	NED	FRA	GBR	GER	AUT	ITA	CAN	USA			6	9th
1974	March 741	Ford Cosworth DFV 3.0 V8	G	(Germany) Hans-Joachim Stuck	Ret	Ret	5	4	Ret	Ret		Ret	DNQ	Ret	7	11	Ret	Ret	DNQ			6	9th
1974	March 741	Ford Cosworth DFV 3.0 V8	G	(Sweden) Reine Wisell							Ret											6	9th
1974	March 741	Ford Cosworth DFV 3.0 V8	G	(New Zealand) Howden Ganley	8	Ret																6	9th
1974	March 741	Ford Cosworth DFV 3.0 V8	G	(Italy) Vittorio Brambilla			10	DNS	9	Ret	10	10	11	Ret	13	6	Ret	DNS	Ret			6	9th
1975	March 751; March 741	Ford Cosworth DFV 3.0 V8	G		ARG	BRA	RSA	ESP	MON	BEL	SWE	NED	FRA	GBR	GER	AUT	ITA	USA				7.5	8th
1975	March 751; March 741	Ford Cosworth DFV 3.0 V8	G	(Italy) Vittorio Brambilla	9	Ret	Ret	5^{‡}	Ret	Ret	Ret^{P}	Ret	Ret	6	Ret	1^{F}^{‡}	Ret	7				7.5	8th
1975	March 751; March 741	Ford Cosworth DFV 3.0 V8	G	(Italy) Lella Lombardi			Ret	6^{‡}	DNQ	Ret	Ret	14	18	Ret	7	17	Ret					7.5	8th
1975	March 751; March 741	Ford Cosworth DFV 3.0 V8	G	(Germany) Hans-Joachim Stuck										Ret	Ret	Ret	Ret	8				7.5	8th
1976	March 761	Ford Cosworth DFV 3.0 V8	G		BRA	RSA	USW	ESP	BEL	MON	SWE	FRA	GBR	GER	AUT	NED	ITA	CAN	USA	JPN		19	7th
1976	March 761	Ford Cosworth DFV 3.0 V8	G	(Italy) Vittorio Brambilla	Ret	8	Ret	Ret	Ret	Ret	10	Ret	Ret	Ret	Ret	6	7	14	Ret	Ret		19	7th
1976	March 761	Ford Cosworth DFV 3.0 V8	G	(Italy) Lella Lombardi	14																	19	7th
1976	March 761	Ford Cosworth DFV 3.0 V8	G	(Sweden) Ronnie Peterson		Ret	10	Ret	Ret	Ret	7	19	Ret	Ret	6	Ret^{P}	1^{F}	9	Ret	Ret		19	7th
1976	March 761	Ford Cosworth DFV 3.0 V8	G	(Germany) Hans-Joachim Stuck	4	12	Ret	Ret	Ret	4	Ret	7	Ret	Ret	Ret	Ret	Ret	Ret	5	Ret		19	7th
1976	March 761	Ford Cosworth DFV 3.0 V8	G	(Italy) Arturo Merzario			DNQ	Ret	Ret	DNQ	14	9	Ret									19	7th
1977	March 761B; March 771	Ford Cosworth DFV 3.0 V8	G		ARG	BRA	RSA	USW	ESP	MON	BEL	SWE	FRA	GBR	GER	AUT	NED	ITA	USA	CAN	JPN	0	NC
1977	March 761B; March 771	Ford Cosworth DFV 3.0 V8	G	(South Africa) Ian Scheckter	Ret	Ret			11	DNQ	Ret	Ret	NC	Ret	Ret	Ret	10	Ret	Ret	Ret		0	NC
1977	March 761B; March 771	Ford Cosworth DFV 3.0 V8	G	(Germany) Hans-Joachim Stuck			Ret															0	NC
1977	March 761B; March 771	Ford Cosworth DFV 3.0 V8	G	(United Kingdom) Brian Henton				10														0	NC
1977	March 761B; March 771	Ford Cosworth DFV 3.0 V8	G	(Brazil) Alex Ribeiro	Ret	Ret	Ret	Ret	DNQ	DNQ	DNQ	DNQ	DNQ	DNQ	8	DNQ	11	DNQ	15	8	12	0	NC
1978 – 1980: March did not compete.
1981	March 811	Ford Cosworth DFV 3.0 V8	MI; A		USW	BRA	ARG	SMR	BEL	MON	ESP	FRA	GBR	GER	AUT	NED	ITA	CAN	CPL			0	NC
1981	March 811	Ford Cosworth DFV 3.0 V8	MI; A	(Republic of Ireland) Derek Daly	DNQ	DNQ	DNQ	DNQ	DNQ	DNPQ	16	Ret	7	Ret	11	Ret	Ret	8	DNQ			0	NC
1981	March 811	Ford Cosworth DFV 3.0 V8	MI; A	(Chile) Eliseo Salazar	DNQ	DNQ	DNQ	Ret	DNQ	DNPQ												0	NC
1982	March 821	Ford Cosworth DFV 3.0 V8	A P		RSA	BRA	USW	SMR	BEL	MON	DET	CAN	NED	GBR	FRA	GER	AUT	SUI	ITA	CPL		0	NC
1982	March 821	Ford Cosworth DFV 3.0 V8	A P	(Brazil) Raul Boesel	15	Ret	9		8	DNPQ	Ret	Ret	Ret	DNQ	DNQ	Ret	DNQ	Ret	DNQ	13		0	NC
1982	March 821	Ford Cosworth DFV 3.0 V8	A P	(Germany) Jochen Mass	12	8	8		Ret	DNQ	7	11	Ret	10	Ret							0	NC
1982	March 821	Ford Cosworth DFV 3.0 V8	A P	(United Kingdom) Rupert Keegan												DNQ	Ret	Ret	DNQ	12		0	NC
1982	March 821	Ford Cosworth DFV 3.0 V8	A P	(Spain) Emilio de Villota					DNPQ	DNPQ	DNQ	DNQ	DNPQ									0	NC
1983 – 1986: March did not compete.
1987	March 87P; March 871	Ford Cosworth DFZ 3.5 V8	G		BRA	SMR	BEL	MON	DET	FRA	GBR	GER	HUN	AUT	ITA	POR	ESP	MEX	JPN	AUS		1	13th
1987	March 87P; March 871	Ford Cosworth DFZ 3.5 V8	G	(Italy) Ivan Capelli	DNS	Ret	Ret	6	Ret	Ret	Ret	Ret	10	11	13	9	12	Ret	Ret	Ret		1	13th
1988	March 881	Judd CV 3.5 V8	G		BRA	SMR	MON	MEX	CAN	DET	FRA	GBR	GER	HUN	BEL	ITA	POR	ESP	JPN	AUS		22	6th
1988	March 881	Judd CV 3.5 V8	G	(Italy) Ivan Capelli	Ret	Ret	10	16	5	DNS	9	Ret	5	Ret	3	5	2	Ret	Ret	6		22	6th
1988	March 881	Judd CV 3.5 V8	G	(Brazil) Maurício Gugelmin	Ret	15	Ret	Ret	Ret	Ret	8	4	8	5	Ret	8	Ret	7	10	Ret		22	6th
1989	March CG891; March 881	Judd CV 3.5 V8; Judd EV 3.5 V8	G		BRA	SMR	MON	MEX	USA	CAN	FRA	GBR	GER	HUN	BEL	ITA	POR	ESP	JPN	AUS		4	12th
1989	March CG891; March 881	Judd CV 3.5 V8; Judd EV 3.5 V8	G	(Italy) Ivan Capelli	Ret	Ret	11^{†}	Ret	Ret	Ret	Ret	Ret	Ret	Ret	12	Ret	Ret	Ret	Ret	Ret		4	12th
1989	March CG891; March 881	Judd CV 3.5 V8; Judd EV 3.5 V8	G	(Brazil) Maurício Gugelmin	3	Ret	Ret	DNQ	DSQ	Ret	NC^{F}	Ret	Ret	Ret	7	Ret	10	Ret	7	7		4	12th
1990 – 1991: Competed as Leyton House Racing.
1992	March CG911B	Ilmor 2175A 3.5 V10	G		RSA	MEX	BRA	ESP	SMR	MON	CAN	FRA	GBR	GER	HUN	BEL	ITA	POR	JPN	AUS		3	9th
1992	March CG911B	Ilmor 2175A 3.5 V10	G	(France) Paul Belmondo	DNQ	DNQ	DNQ	12	13	DNQ	14	DNQ	DNQ	13	9							3	9th
1992	March CG911B	Ilmor 2175A 3.5 V10	G	(Italy) Emanuele Naspetti												12	Ret	11	13	Ret		3	9th
1992	March CG911B	Ilmor 2175A 3.5 V10	G	(Austria) Karl Wendlinger	Ret	Ret	Ret	8	12	Ret	4	Ret	Ret	16	Ret	11	10	Ret				3	9th
1992	March CG911B	Ilmor 2175A 3.5 V10	G	(Netherlands) Jan Lammers															Ret	12		3	9th

Notes

- † – The driver did not finish the Grand Prix, but was classified, as they completed over 90% of the race distance.
- ‡ – Half points awarded as less than 75% of the race distance was completed.

=== Results of other March cars ===
(key)

Year	Entrant	Chassis	Engine	Tyres	Drivers	1	2	3	4	5	6	7	8	9	10	11	12	13	14	15	16	17
1970						RSA	ESP	MON	BEL	NED	FRA	GBR	GER	AUT	ITA	CAN	USA	MEX				
1970	Tyrrell Racing Organisation	701	Ford Cosworth DFV 3.0 V8	D	(United Kingdom) Jackie Stewart	3^{P}	1	Ret^{P}	Ret^{P}	2	9	Ret	Ret	Ret	2							
1970	Tyrrell Racing Organisation	701	Ford Cosworth DFV 3.0 V8	D	(France) Johnny Servoz-Gavin	Ret	5	DNQ														
1970	Tyrrell Racing Organisation	701	Ford Cosworth DFV 3.0 V8	D	(France) François Cevert					Ret	11	7	7	Ret	6	9	Ret	Ret				
1970	STP Corporation	701	Ford Cosworth DFV 3.0 V8	F	(United States) Mario Andretti	Ret	3					Ret	Ret	Ret								
1970	Antique Automobiles Racing Team	701	Ford Cosworth DFV 3.0 V8	G	(Sweden) Ronnie Peterson			7	NC													
1970	Colin Crabbe Racing	701	Ford Cosworth DFV 3.0 V8	G	(Sweden) Ronnie Peterson					9	Ret	9	Ret		Ret	NC	11					
1970	Hubert Hahne	701	Ford Cosworth DFV 3.0 V8	F	(Germany) Hubert Hahne								DNQ									
1971						RSA	ESP	MON	NED	FRA	GBR	GER	AUT	ITA	CAN	USA						
1971	Frank Williams Racing Cars	701; 711	Ford Cosworth DFV 3.0 V8	F	(France) Henri Pescarolo	11	Ret	8	NC	Ret	4	Ret	6	Ret^{F}	DNS	Ret						
1971	Frank Williams Racing Cars	701; 711	Ford Cosworth DFV 3.0 V8	F	(France) Max Jean						NC											
1971	Team Gunston	701	Ford Cosworth DFV 3.0 V8	G	(Rhodesia) John Love	Ret																
1971	Gene Mason Racing	711	Ford Cosworth DFV 3.0 V8	F	(United States) Skip Barber			DNQ	NC						Ret	NC						
1971	Jo Siffert Automobiles	701	Ford Cosworth DFV 3.0 V8	F	(France) François Mazet					13												
1971	Clarke-Mordaunt-Guthrie Racing	711	Ford Cosworth DFV 3.0 V8	F	(United Kingdom) Mike Beuttler						Ret	DSQ	NC	Ret								
1971	Shell Arnold Team	701	Ford Cosworth DFV 3.0 V8	F	(France) Jean-Pierre Jarier									NC								
1972						ARG	RSA	ESP	MON	BEL	FRA	GBR	GER	AUT	ITA	CAN	USA					
1972	Team Williams Motul	721; 711	Ford Cosworth DFV 3.0 V8	G	(France) Henri Pescarolo	8	11	11	Ret	NC	DNS		Ret	DNS	DNQ	13	14					
1972	Team Williams Motul	721; 711	Ford Cosworth DFV 3.0 V8	G	(Brazil) José Carlos Pace		17	6	17	5	Ret	Ret	NC	NC	Ret	9	Ret					
1972	Clarke-Mordaunt-Guthrie Racing	721G	Ford Cosworth DFV 3.0 V8	F	(United Kingdom) Mike Beuttler			DNQ	13	Ret	Ret	13	8	Ret	10	NC	13					
1972	Gene Mason Racing	711	Ford Cosworth DFV 3.0 V8	F	(United States) Skip Barber											NC	16					
1973						ARG	BRA	RSA	ESP	BEL	MON	SWE	FRA	GBR	NED	GER	AUT	ITA	CAN	USA		
1973	Clarke-Mordaunt-Guthrie-Durlacher	731; 721X	Ford Cosworth DFV 3.0 V8	G	(United Kingdom) Mike Beuttler	10	Ret	NC	7	11	Ret	8		11	Ret	16	Ret	Ret	Ret	10		
1973	Clarke-Mordaunt-Guthrie-Durlacher	731; 721X	Ford Cosworth DFV 3.0 V8	G	(Sweden) Reine Wisell							DNS	Ret									
1973	Hesketh Racing	731	Ford Cosworth DFV 3.0 V8	F	(United Kingdom) James Hunt						9		6	4^{F}	3		Ret	DNS	7	2^{F}		
1973	LEC Refrigeration Racing	731	Ford Cosworth DFV 3.0 V8	G	(United Kingdom) David Purley						Ret			DNS	Ret	15		9				
1974						ARG	BRA	RSA	ESP	BEL	MON	SWE	NED	FRA	GBR	GER	AUT	ITA	CAN	USA		
1974	Hesketh Racing	731	Ford Cosworth DFV 3.0 V8	F	(United Kingdom) James Hunt	Ret	9															
1974	Dempster Internacional Racing Team	731	Ford Cosworth DFV 3.0 V8	F	(United Kingdom) Mike Wilds										DNQ							
1975						ARG	BRA	RSA	ESP	MON	BEL	SWE	NED	FRA	GBR	GER	AUT	ITA	USA			
1975	Penske Racing	751	Ford Cosworth DFV 3.0 V8	G	(United States) Mark Donohue										5	Ret	DNS					
1977						ARG	BRA	RSA	USW	ESP	MON	BEL	SWE	FRA	GBR	GER	AUT	NED	ITA	USA	CAN	JPN
1977	Chesterfield Racing	761	Ford Cosworth DFV 3.0 V8	G	(United States) Brett Lunger			14	Ret	10												
1977	RAM Racing/F&S Properties; RAM Racing	761	Ford Cosworth DFV 3.0 V8	G	(Netherlands) Boy Hayje			Ret		DNQ	DNQ	NC	DNQ					DNQ				
1977	RAM Racing/F&S Properties; RAM Racing	761	Ford Cosworth DFV 3.0 V8	G	(Finland) Mikko Kozarowitzky								DNQ		DNPQ							
1977	RAM Racing/F&S Properties; RAM Racing	761	Ford Cosworth DFV 3.0 V8	G	(United Kingdom) Andy Sutcliffe										DNPQ							
1977	RAM Racing/F&S Properties; RAM Racing	761	Ford Cosworth DFV 3.0 V8	G	(Netherlands) Michael Bleekemolen													DNQ				
1977	Team Merzario	761B	Ford Cosworth DFV 3.0 V8	G	(Italy) Arturo Merzario					Ret	DNQ	14		Ret	Ret	DNQ		DNQ				
1977	Williams Grand Prix Engineering	761	Ford Cosworth DFV 3.0 V8	G	(Belgium) Patrick Nève					12		10	15	DNQ	10	DNQ	9	DNQ	7	18	Ret	
1977	British Formula One Racing	761	Ford Cosworth DFV 3.0 V8	G	(United Kingdom) Brian Henton					DNQ					DNQ		DNQ					
1977	British Formula One Racing	761	Ford Cosworth DFV 3.0 V8	G	(Belgium) Bernard de Dryver							DNQ										
1978						ARG	BRA	RSA	USW	MON	BEL	ESP	SWE	FRA	GBR	GER	AUT	NED	ITA	USA	CAN	
1978	Patrick Nève	781S	Ford Cosworth DFV 3.0 V8	G	(Belgium) Patrick Nève						DNP											
