= Lombardia (disambiguation) =

Lombardia may refer to:

- Lombardia, Italian name for Lombardy region in Italy
- Lombardia Svizzera, alternative name of Italian Switzerland
- Lombardia Siciliana, ethno-linguistic minority living in Sicily, southern Italy
- Lombardia (wine), wine produced in the Lombardy region of north central Italy
- Ascelin of Lombardia, a 13th-century Dominican friar
- Romano di Lombardia, a municipality in the Province of Bergamo in the Italian region of Lombardy
- Palazzo Lombardia, a skyscraper in Milan, Italy
- Giro di Lombardia, a cycling race, in Lombardy, Italy
- Castello di Lombardia, castle in Enna, Sicily

== People with the surname ==
- Pedro Lombardía, Spanish canonist

== See also ==
- Lombardi (disambiguation)
- Lombardo
