= Philip Gilbert (disambiguation) =

Philip or Phil Gilbert may refer to:

- Philip Gilbert (1931–2004), Canadian actor
- Phil Gilbert (design executive) (born 1964), IBM executive
- Phil Gilbert (born 1969), Australian rules footballer
- Phil Gilbert (English footballer) (born 1944), English footballer
- Philip H. Gilbert (1870–1932), Louisiana politician
- Philippe Gilbert (born 1982), Belgian bicyclist
