= Longobardi (surname) =

Longobardi is an Italian surname. Notable people with the surname include:

- Cristian Longobardi (born 1982), Italian football player
- Joseph J. Longobardi (1930), American federal judge
- Marcelo Longobardi (born 1961), Argentine journalist
- Maria Longobardi (disambiguation), multiple people
- Nino Longobardi (born 1953), Italian artist

== See also ==
- Longobardi (disambiguation)
- Longobardo
