= Maria Longobardi =

Maria Longobardi may refer to:

- Maria Longobardi (mathematician), Italian information theorist at the University of Naples Federico II
- Maria Longobardi (physicist), Italian condensed matter physicist at the University of Basel
