= Lombardini =

Lombardini may refer to:

- Lombardini S.r.l., Italian manufacturer of Diesel engines up to 134HP
- Maddalena Laura Lombardini (1745–1818), Italian composer, violinist, and singer, also known as Maddalena Laura Sirmen
- Manuel José María Ignacio Lombardini de la Torre (1802–1853), Mexican general and politician
- Siro Lombardini (1924–2013), Italian economist and politician

== See also ==
- Lombardi (disambiguation)
