= March 741 =

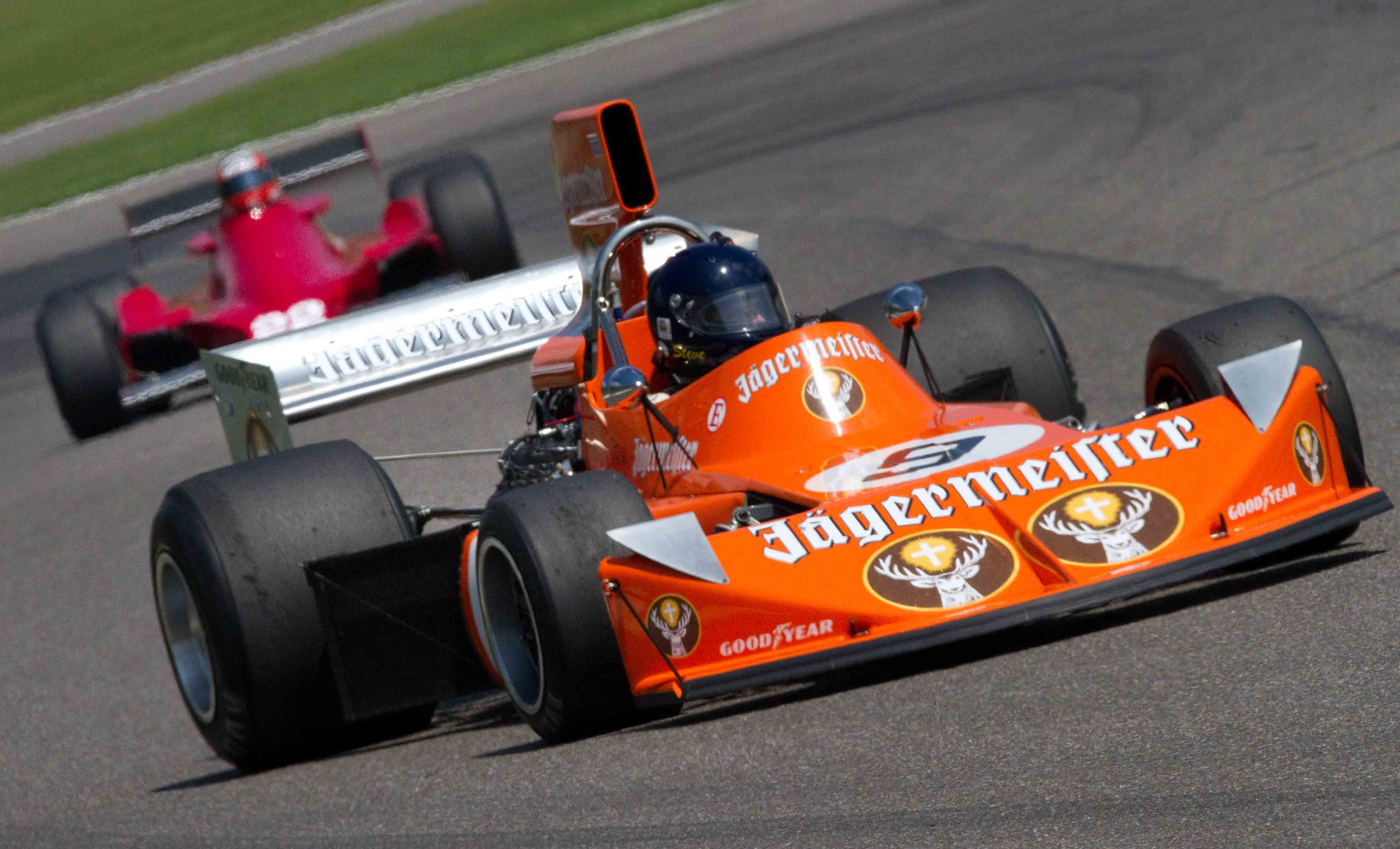
- Category: Formula One
- Designer: Robin Herd
- Predecessor: March 731
- Successor: March 751

Technical specifications
- Engine: Cosworth DFV

Competition history
- Notable drivers: (Germany) Hans-Joachim Stuck (Sweden) Reine Wisell (New Zealand) Howden Ganley (Italy) Vittorio Brambilla
- Debut: 1974 Argentine Grand Prix
Races	Wins	Podiums
38	0	0
- Constructors' Championships: 0
- Drivers' Championships: 0

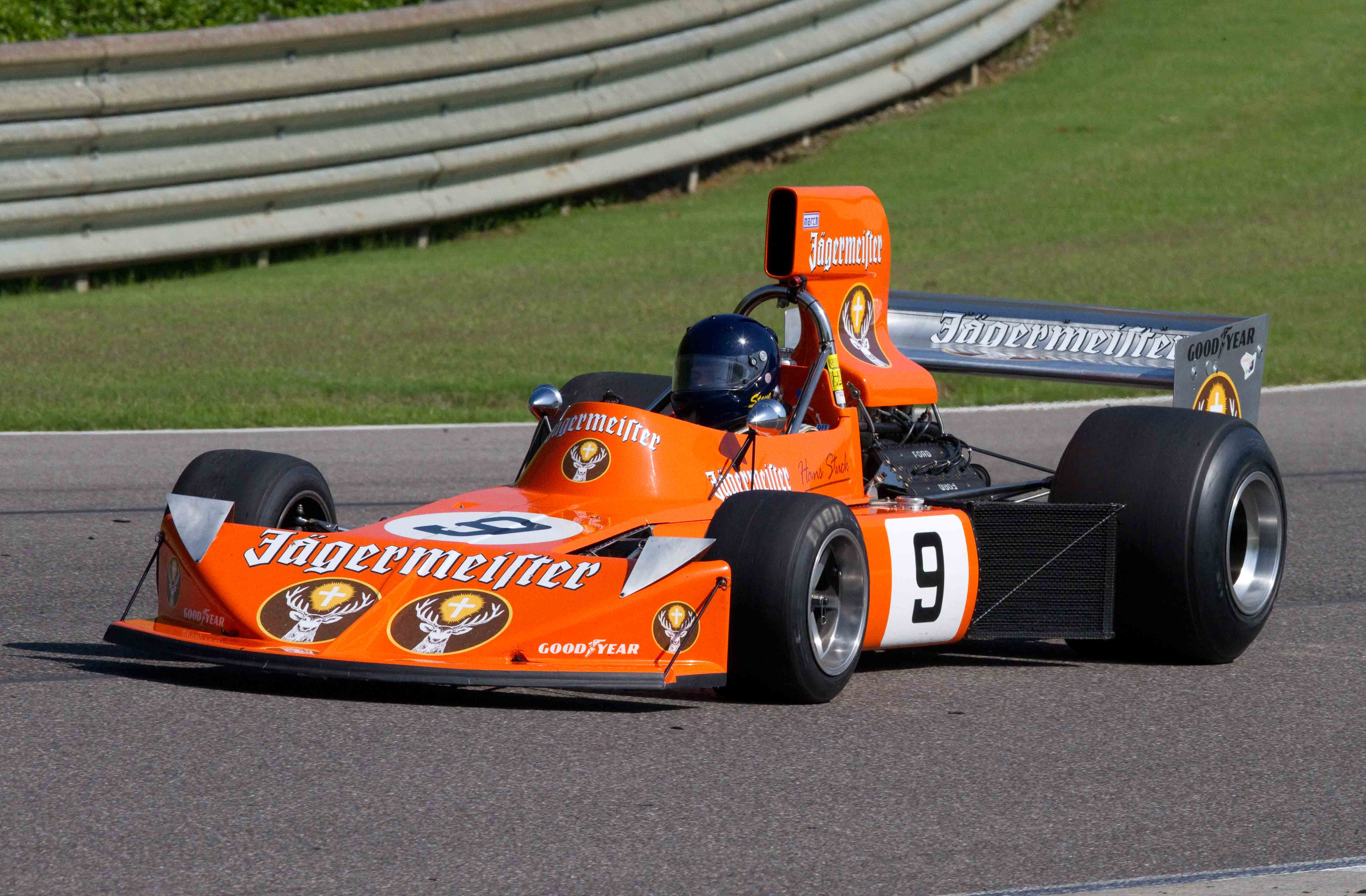
Another view of a March 741 at Barber Motorsport Park in 2010

The March 741 is a Formula One car, designed, developed and built by March Engineering for the 1974 season, powered by a 3.0 L (180 cu in) Cosworth DFV engine. Although more successful than its predecessor, the March 731, it failed to finish any higher than fourth place.

== Development ==
Following the dismal performance of the previous season's 731, designer Robin Herd based the 741 on the monocoque and suspension of the 732, March's successful Formula Two car. He moved the radiators to the side and the oil cooler to the rear.

== Racing history ==
March started the season with drivers Hans-Joachim Stuck and Howden Ganley. Ganley was replaced after two races by Vittorio Brambilla, who brought in sponsorship from Beta Utensili.

Stuck was initially impressive; although he retired in Argentina and Brazil, he then finished fifth and fourth in South Africa and Spain. However these were his best results, and he only finished two more races, retiring from others and not qualifying in France and the United States. Brambilla was less successful; as fast as Stuck in qualifying, he finished in the points only once, although he completed more races than his team-mate. March ended the season in ninth place in the constructors' championship.

The following year, Brambilla continued with the 741 for the first two races until a new 751 was available, finishing ninth in Argentina. Lella Lombardi then raced it in South Africa, after which the 741 was retired.

== Complete Formula One World Championship results ==
(key)

Year	Entrant	Engine	Tyres	Drivers	1	2	3	4	5	6	7	8	9	10	11	12	13	14	15	WCC	Points
1974	March Engineering	Cosworth DFV 3.0 V8	G		ARG	BRA	RSA	ESP	BEL	MON	SWE	NED	FRA	GBR	GER	AUT	ITA	CAN	USA	9th	6
1974	March Engineering	Cosworth DFV 3.0 V8	G	Hans-Joachim Stuck	Ret	Ret	5	4	Ret	Ret		Ret	DNQ	Ret	7	11	Ret	Ret	DNQ	9th	6
1974	March Engineering	Cosworth DFV 3.0 V8	G	Reine Wisell							Ret									9th	6
1974	March Engineering	Cosworth DFV 3.0 V8	G	Howden Ganley	8	Ret														9th	6
1974	March Engineering	Cosworth DFV 3.0 V8	G	Vittorio Brambilla			10	DNS	9	Ret	10	10	11	Ret	13	6	Ret	DNQ	Ret	9th	6
1975	March Engineering	Cosworth DFV 3.0 V8	G		ARG	BRA	RSA	ESP	MON	BEL	SWE	NED	FRA	GBR	GER	AUT	ITA	USA		8th	7.5
1975	March Engineering	Cosworth DFV 3.0 V8	G	Vittorio Brambilla	9	Ret														8th	7.5
1975	March Engineering	Cosworth DFV 3.0 V8	G	Lella Lombardi			Ret													8th	7.5
