= Chief design officer =

High ranking corporate officer

Chief design officer (CDO), or design executive officer (DEO), is a corporate title sometimes given to an executive in charge of an organization's design initiatives. The CDO is typically responsible for overseeing all design and innovation aspects of a company's products and services, including product design, architectural design, graphic design, user experience design, industrial design, and package design. They may also be responsible for aspects of advertising, marketing, and engineering.

The position has emerged only recently, with chief design officers taking on roles that may have previously been assumed by a chief marketing officer, chief product officer, chief brand officer or delegated to lower-ranking design executives.

In the United States, the Chief Design Officer is a position in the federal government, tasked with leading efforts to improve government websites.

== CxO ==
As with many other CxO roles it does not necessarily mean the role reports to the CEO. In some companies the title is in name only and does not actually mean the role holder is an executive. Some companies – such as IBM have many CDOs as executives of major divisions within the corporation.

== Chief design officers ==
Name	Company	From	To	Succeed by	Reports to CEO
Luc Donckerwolke	Hyundai Motor Company	2018	2021	SangYup Lee	Yes
Christopher Hawthorne	City of Los Angeles	2018	Current		
Rogier van der Heide	Philips Lighting, Zumtobel Group	2010	2017		
John Hoke III	Nike, Inc.	2017	2023	MartinLotti	Yes
Jonathan 'Jony' Ive	Apple Inc.	2015	2019	Role no longer exists	Yes
Stefano Marzano	Electrolux	2012	2014	Lars Erikson	Yes
Peter Schreyer	Kia	2006	2020	Karim Habib	Yes
Eric Quint	3M	2013	2020	Brian Rice	No
Mauro Porcini	PepsiCo.	2012	2025	Role no longer exists	No
Sean Carney	Philips	2011	2022		No
Pernilla Johannson	Electrolux	2018	2021	Simon Bradford	No
Lars Erikson	Electrolux	2014	2018	Pernilla Johannson	
Hanna Harris	City of Helsinki	2020	Current		
Anne Stenros	City of Helsinki	2016	2018	Hanna Harris	
Alastair Curtis	Logitech	2013	2023	Malin Leschly	Yes
Opher Yom-Tov	ANZ Bank	2017	2023	Role no longer exists	No
Dantley Davis	Twitter	2019	2022	Role no longer exists	
Katrina Alcorn	IBM (Global)	2021	2023	Role no longer exists	No
Phil Gilbert	IBM (Global)	2010	2021	Katrina Alcorn	No
Arin Bhowmick	IBM (Product Division)	2015	2022	Role no longer exists	No
Daniela Jorge	Capital One	2023	Current		
Rainer Wessler	DBS Bank	2021	Current		
Chooake Wongwattanasilpa	DBS Bank	2019	2020	Rainer Wessler	
Roger Rohatgi	BP	2020	Current		
Dan Makoski	Lloyds Banking Group	2018	2021	Role no longer exists	No
Arin Bhowmick	SAP	2022	Current		No
Kat Crotty	GEICO Insurance	2022	Current		
Monica Dalla Riva	Deutsche Telekom AG	2024	Current		
Joebin Caoile	Brewspark Technologies Group	2017	Current		No

== See also ==
- Chief innovation officer
- Chief idea officer
