= John Hoke III =

American architect and designer (born 1965)

- Born: 1965 (age 60–61)
- Education: Pennsylvania State University, University of Pennsylvania, Stanford University
- Occupations: Architect, designer, business executive
- Employer: Nike (1992–2025)
- Awards: Distinguished Alumni (Pennsylvania State University); Pinnacle Award (International Dyslexia Association)

John Hoke III (born 1965) is an American architect and designer who most recently served as chief innovation officer of Nike, Inc. from 2023 to 2025. He led the company's design team which includes more than 1,000 product and industrial designers, graphic designers, and fashion designers, as well as architects, interface, and digital content designers.

== Early life and education ==
Hoke grew up outside of Providence, Rhode Island. As a child, he was athletic and enjoyed running in the Nike waffle trainer shoe. After he had worn out a pair, he would slice the shoe in half to examine how it was made.

One summer, Hoke was floating on a raft in a pool, when he wondered what would happen if he could shrink the raft and put it under his foot to cushion and help with shock absorption and spring. He made sketches of his idea and was encouraged by his father, an engineer, to send it to Nike co-founder and president Phil Knight. To his surprise, Knight wrote back and sent him a pair of trainers and a T-shirt, encouraging Hoke to work for Nike when he was older. At the time, Hoke was 12 years old. (Note: While most articles state that Hoke was 12 years old at the time, Visual Merchandising and Store Design said in 2002 that he was 13.)

Hoke has spoken openly about growing up with dyslexia, and has said that he considers drawing to be his first language. With support from his parents, he worked with a specialist from Brown University and realized that his dyslexia could be an advantage, and that his strengths were in "art, design, and creativity".

Hoke received an undergraduate degree in architecture (B.Arch) from Pennsylvania State University in 1988, followed by a Master of Architecture (M.Arch) from the University of Pennsylvania, and a Stanford University MBA.

== Work and career ==
Early in his career, Hoke worked as a model maker for architect Michael Graves, who, until he died in 2015, was a mentor of Hoke's. Hoke was hired by Nike in 1992 as a senior designer in environmental design. His early projects at Nike included the Nike pavilion at the 1996 Summer Olympics in Atlanta and NikeTown New York. In 2002, he became global creative director for footwear design. He served as Nike's chief design officer (CDO) from 2017 to 2023, and was then named chief innovation officer (CIO) in November 2023. Martin Lotti, a "26-year veteran" of the company, replaced Hoke as CDO. In May 2025 Nike announced that Hoke was retiring.

=== Collaborations ===
At Nike, he has collaborated with Serena Williams for almost 20 years. Speaking about Williams for an article in The New York Times by fashion critic Vanessa Friedman, he said "on a scale of 1 to 10 of involvement with her clothes, she is a 10." Under his leadership, Nike has also worked with designers such as Virgil Abloh, Max Lamb, and Sebastian Wrong, the architect Greg Lynn, and artists including Tom Sachs and Travis Scott, and brands such as Jacquemus, Comme des Garçons, and Louis Vuitton.

The largest building at Nike World Headquarters in Beaverton, Oregon, is the one-million-square-foot (93,000 m^{2}) Serena Williams Building which features many references to the athlete's career and her long collaboration with Nike. It was designed by Skylab Architecture, and according to Hoke, involved important creative input from Williams herself. Hoke's house, also designed in collaboration with Skylab Architecture, appears in the Twilight film franchise.

=== Sustainability at Nike ===
In an interview with Monocle magazine, Hoke said: "Regeneration is going to be a huge part of design's future, that means the constant reimagining of matter. How this shoe becomes a basketball, becomes a shirt, becomes a bag and goes back to being a shoe. We have that power, that control, as designers." Hoke has also spoken about Nike's "Move To Zero" design philosophy and the role that circular design, sustainability, and carbon footprint reduction will play in its design practice, and has stated that "[o]ur role as a brand is to be very thoughtful about sport and our planet." However, the "Move To Zero" initiative has been criticised for falling short of its stated goals.

In 2023, Nike published a book titled No Finish Line that sets out the company's design vision for the future. The foreword was written by Hoke, and it includes essays and writing by Geoff Manaugh and Sam Grawe.

== Board membership ==
Hoke is a permanent design fellow at Pennsylvania State University. He is or has been a member of the Herman Miller Inc. board of directors; a trustee at Pacific Northwest College of Art; and a national trustee of the Cooper Hewitt, Smithsonian Design Museum.

== Awards and honours ==
- 2019 Pinnacle Award, International Dyslexia Association
- 2023 Distinguished Alumni Award, Pennsylvania State University

== Personal life ==
Hoke lives with his wife and three sons in Portland, Oregon.

== Publications ==
- The Surreal Visions of Hernán Díaz Alonso/HDA-X with a foreword by John Hoke III, ISBN 978-0-500-34350-0
- HAY. Rolf and Mette Hay, edited by Kelsey Keith, with a foreword by John Hoke III, ISBN 978-1-83866-564-7
- Grawe, Sam (2020). Nike: better is temporary. Phaidon, London. ISBN 978-1-83866-051-2. OCLC 1239321925
- After all, there is No Finish Line. (2023) Actual Source, Provo. ISBN 979-8-9872648-0-5
