= Longobardi =

Longobardi may refer to:

- Lombards, a Germanic people who ruled most of the Italian Peninsula from 568 to 774
- Longobardi, Calabria, a comune in the Province of Cosenza, Italy
- Longobardi (surname), Italian surname

== See also ==
- Longobardo
- Lombardi (disambiguation)
