= March 751 =

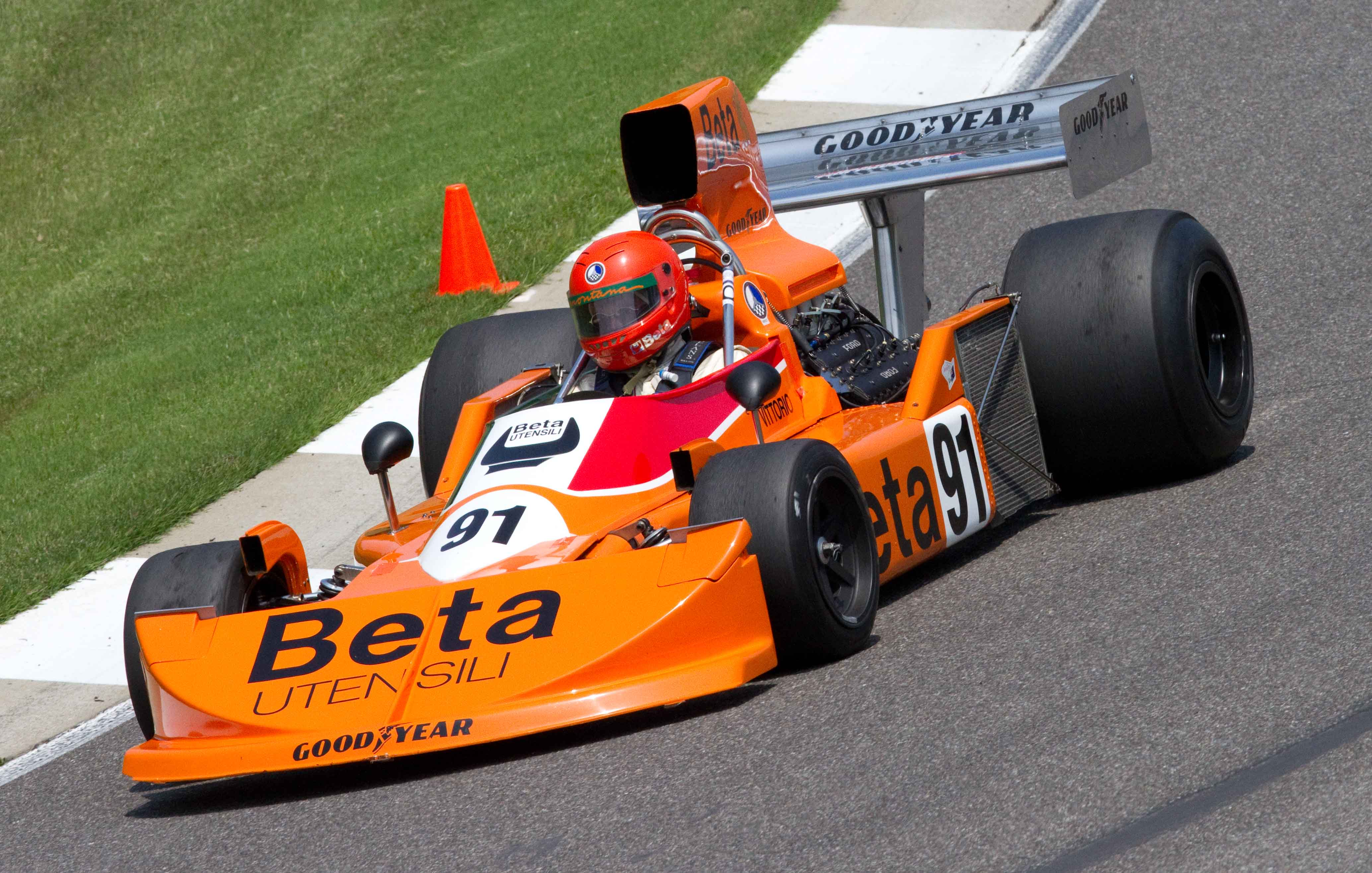
- Category: Formula One
- Designer: Robin Herd
- Predecessor: March 741
- Successor: March 761

Technical specifications
- Engine: Cosworth DFV

Competition history
- Notable drivers: (Italy) Vittorio Brambilla (Italy) Lella Lombardi (Germany) Hans-Joachim Stuck (United States) Mark Donohue
- Debut: 1975 South African Grand Prix
| Races | Wins | Podiums |
|---|---|---|
| 33 | 1 | 1 |
- Constructors' Championships: 0
- Drivers' Championships: 0

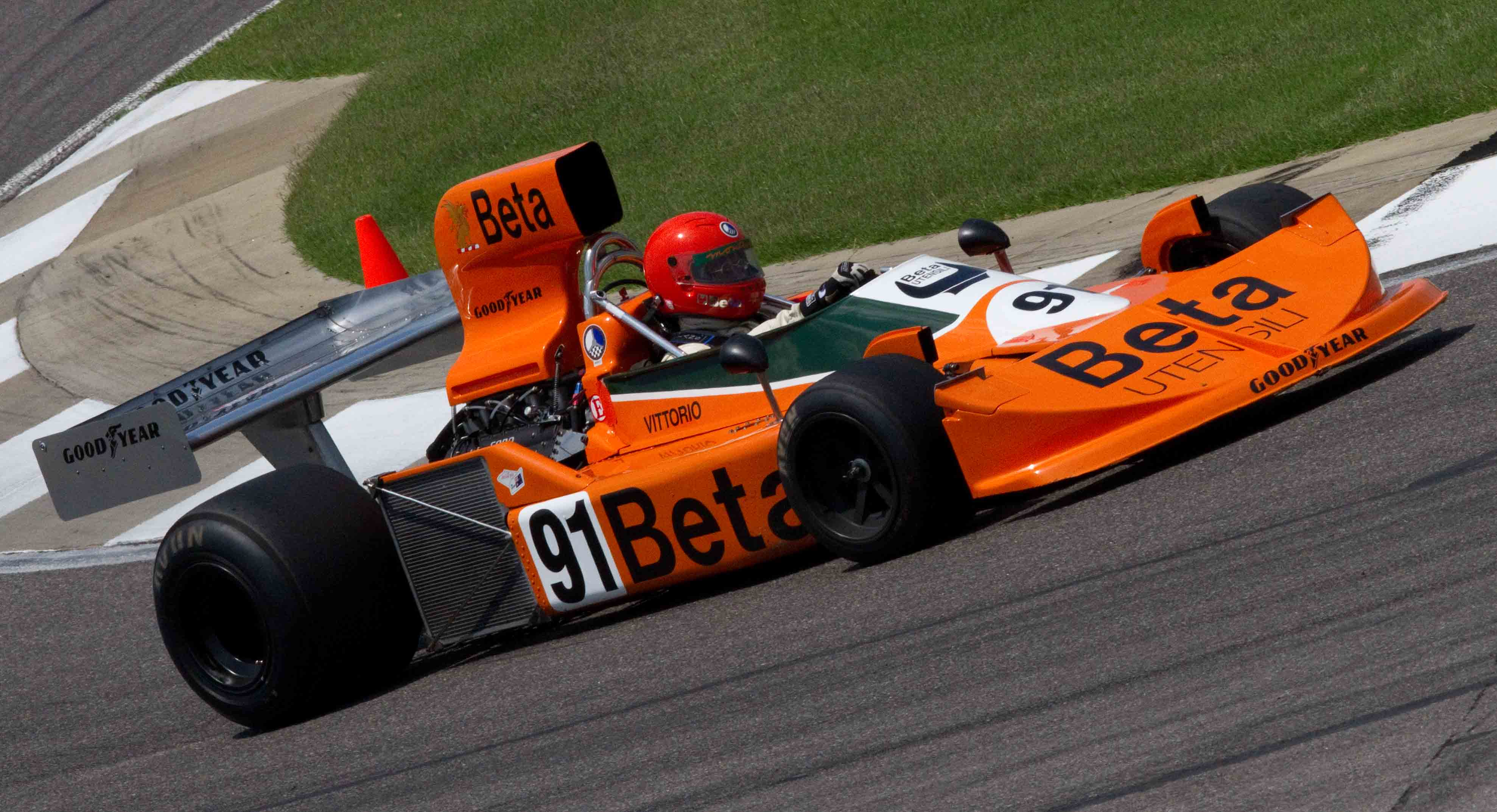
Another view of a March 751 at Barber Motorsport Park in 2010

The March 751 is a Formula One car, designed, developed and built by March Engineering for the 1975 season, powered by a 3.0 L (180 cu in) Cosworth DFV engine. It gave Vittorio Brambilla his only World Championship win, at the rain-shortened Austrian Grand Prix, and Lella Lombardi became the first woman to score points in a World Championship Grand Prix, gaining half a point at the accident-shortened Spanish Grand Prix.

== Racing history ==
The works team comprised Vittorio Brambilla and Lella Lombardi, with Hans-Joachim Stuck joining for the last five races of the season. Brambilla qualified on pole for the Swedish Grand Prix but retired, and won the Austrian Grand Prix, setting fastest lap as he did so. Lombardi gained half a point at the shortened Spanish Grand Prix.

Team Penske ran a 751 for Mark Donohue for several races; unfortunately Donohue was killed in practice for the Austrian Grand Prix.

March finished the season in eighth place in the Constructors' Championship. The three surviving cars were rebuilt as 761s for the following season.

== Complete Formula One World Championship results ==
(key)

| Year | Entrant | Engine | Tyres | Drivers | 1 | 2 | 3 | 4 | 5 | 6 | 7 | 8 | 9 | 10 | 11 | 12 | 13 | 14 | WCC | Points |
|---|---|---|---|---|---|---|---|---|---|---|---|---|---|---|---|---|---|---|---|---|
| 1975 | March Engineering | Cosworth DFV 3.0 V8 | G | | ARG | BRA | RSA | ESP | MON | BEL | SWE | NED | FRA | GBR | GER | AUT | ITA | USA | 8th | 7.5 |
| 1975 | March Engineering | Cosworth DFV 3.0 V8 | G | Vittorio Brambilla | | | Ret | 5 | Ret | Ret | Ret | Ret | Ret | 6 | Ret | 1 | Ret | 7 | 8th | 7.5 |
| 1975 | March Engineering | Cosworth DFV 3.0 V8 | G | Lella Lombardi | | | | 6 | DNQ | Ret | Ret | 14 | 18 | Ret | 7 | 17 | Ret | | 8th | 7.5 |
| 1975 | March Engineering | Cosworth DFV 3.0 V8 | G | Hans-Joachim Stuck | | | | | | | | | | Ret | Ret | Ret | Ret | 8 | 8th | 7.5 |
| 1975 | Team Penske | Cosworth DFV 3.0 V8 | G | Mark Donohue | | | | | | | | | | 5 | Ret | DNS | | | 8th | 7.5 |
