= Mauro Porcini =

Italian designer

Mauro Porcini Mauro Porcini
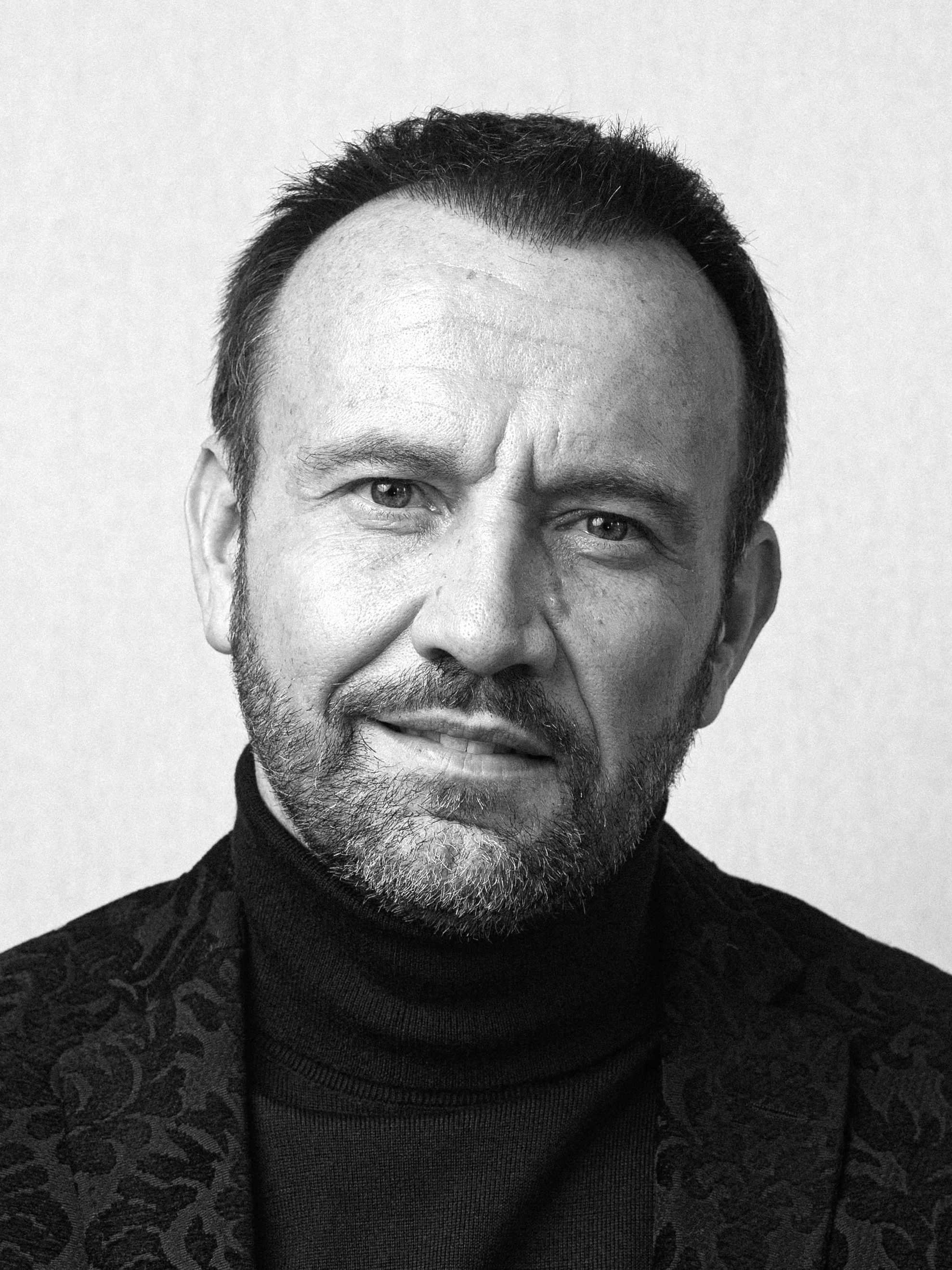
- Education: Politecnico di Milano
- Occupation: Chief Design Officer
- Employer: Samsung
- Website: www.mauro-porcini.com

Mauro Porcini is an Italian designer and business executive who is the first chief design officer for Samsung. He previously served as the chief design officer at 3M and PepsiCo. He is the author of two books and received several awards and recognition for his work in design and innovation.

== Early life and education ==
Porcini was born in Gallarate, Italy and raised in Varese. He studied industrial design at Politecnico di Milano, receiving his Master's degree from the university in 2000.

== Career ==
Porcini began his career at Philips Design prior to starting the design firm Wisemad Srl with Claudio Cecchetto. He then worked at 3M, joining its European operations as a design manager in 2002 and becoming head of global strategic design three years later. He became the company's first chief design officer in 2010. His work there was described in the media as having "turned pedestrian Scotch tape and Post-it note dispensers into desk art".

In 2012, Porcini was recruited to be the first chief design officer PepsiCo. It was reported at the time that ""PepsiCo hired Porcini largely because he created a design-led culture from scratch at a major company, 3M". He also serves as a senior vice president and has been credited with innovative designs for the company's product portfolio and brands. He and his team have received more than 2,300 design and innovation awards and in 2018 he was awarded the title of Cavaliere dell’Ordine della Stella d’Italia, and order of Knighthood, by Sergio Mattarella.

In 2021, Porcini published L'Età dell'Eccellenza – Come Innovazione e Creatività Possono Costruire un Mondo Migliore (en., Age of Excellence). The following year he published The Human Side of Innovation, a book about innovation, design, and leadership. The book Good Design is for Everyone details his first 10 years of his work at the Pepsico.

Porcini has received recognition for his work in design, including being name one of the 50 Most Influential Designers in American by Fast Company and part of Fortune's 40 Under 40 list. In 2025, he became the first chief design officer at Samsung.
