= Michael Lombardi =

Michael (or Mike) Lombardi may refer to:

- Michael Lombardi (American football) (born 1959), American football executive and sports commentator
- Michael Lombardi (baseball) (born 2003), baseball pitcher
- Michael Lombardi (entrepreneur) (born 1964), Canadian-born entrepreneur, investor, publisher and author
- Mick Lombardi, American football coach
- Michael Lombardi (actor) (born 1976), American actor
