= Lombardi Software =

Lombardi Software, Inc.
- Type: Private
- Industry: Computer Software
- Founded: 1998
- Headquarters: Austin, Texas
- Key people: Brian Cooper, Founder, Startup CEO & Chairman; Eric Hanich, Founder, Startup CTO; Rod Favaron, CEO, chair Phil Gilbert, president Jim Luttenbacher, CFO, Olivier Gachot, CRO
- Products: Business process management software

Lombardi Software was an enterprise software company based in Austin, Texas. Lombardi Software created business process management (BPM) software and was founded in 1998. It was acquired by IBM in 2010 when it had 220 employees.

== Significance in BPM ==
Lombardi Software was founded in 1998 by Brian Cooper and Eric Hanich in Austin, Texas. It was the first "Pure Play" BPM software vendor to market. It specialized in business process management from its founding. Unlike other "stack vendors", Lombardi did not sell products or services outside the BPM industry. Lombardi lodged a number of Patents for the innovation created in TeamWorks, but with a change of management were not followed through with. Phil Gilbert, President, was, for a period, Chairperson of the Object Management Group's (OMG) BPM Steering Committee which manages process management standards such as BPMN. At IBM, as of 2015, he was general manager of design leading a project to make design central to IBM's program of developing new products based on consumers'needs.Phil Gilbert has played a key role in IBM's efforts to focus product development on design.

Lombardi was the first BPM vendor to create a tool, Lombardi Blueprint, based on Web 2.0 practices. Compared to traditional business process modeling tools, Blueprint is a web-based application with wiki, shared whiteboard, and chat capabilities. It was one of the first "Business applications" based on Web 2.0 technologies and methodology.

== Products ==
There were two products created by Lombardi:

Lombardi Teamworks – Lombardi's primary product – a business process management suite (BPMS). This tool was designed to create, optimize, and manage executable workflow diagrams.

Lombardi Blueprint – This tool is described as a process documentation and discovery tool.
