= GMS Durango LMP1 =

- Constructor: GMS
- Successor: Durango PM 02

Technical specifications
- Engine: 2000–2001: Mader-BMW 4,000 cc (244.1 cu in) naturally aspirated V8, mid engined 2002: Judd GV4 4,000 cc (244.1 cu in) naturally aspirated V10
- Tyres: Goodyear; Avon

Competition history
- Notable entrants: Durango
- Debut: 2000 SportsRacing World Cup Spa
Races	Wins
13 (17 entries)	1 (2 class)
- Teams' Championships: 0
- Constructors' Championships: 0
- Drivers' Championships: 0

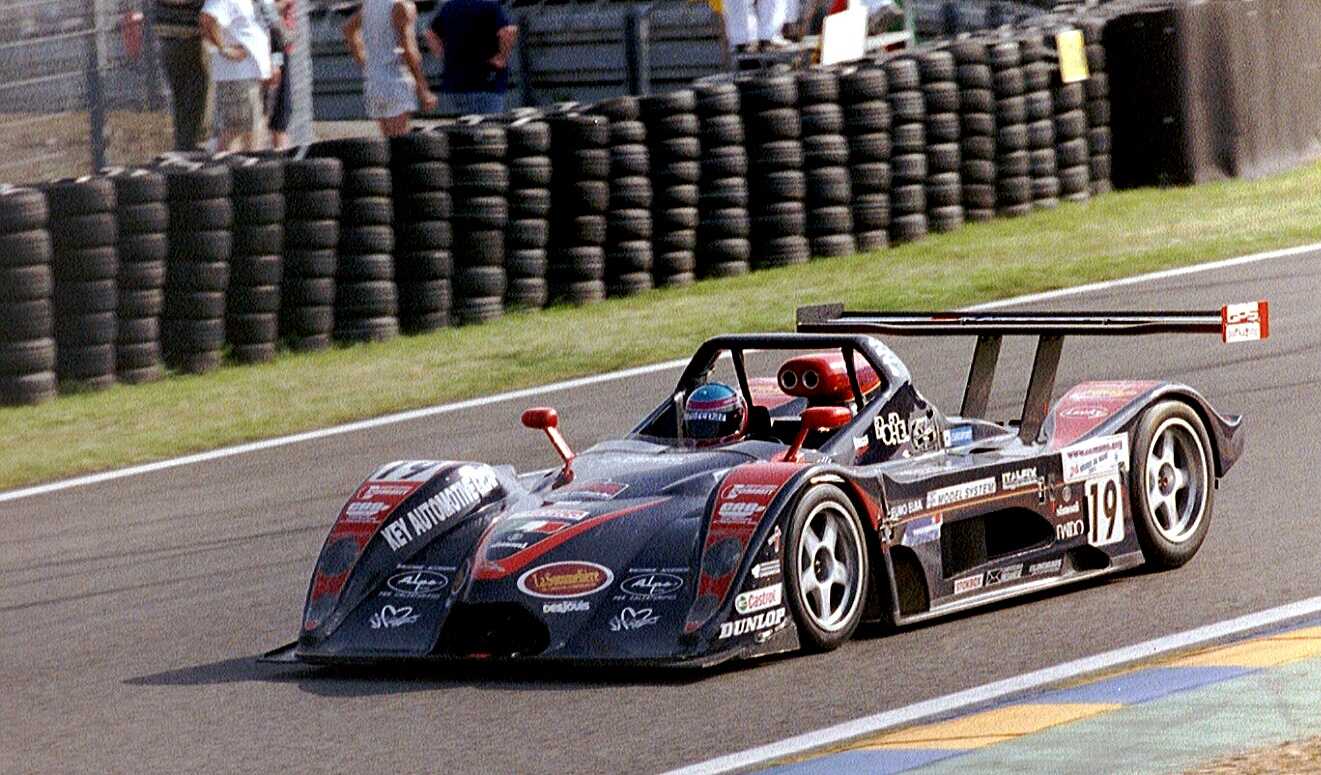
Durango LMP1-2003

The GMS Durango LMP1 was a Le Mans Prototype built for Durango by GMS in 2000. Initially fitted with a 4-litre BMW V8 engine, which was prepared by Mader, a Judd GV4 V10 was fitted in its place for the 2002 season. Durango replaced the car with their own PM 02 for the 2003 season. The GMS Durango LMP1 was not particularly successful, and had a weak gearbox; but it was able to win one race, the 2002 6 Hours of Vallelunga.

== Racing history ==
=== 2000 ===
In 2000, Durango commissioned GMS to build a Le Mans Prototype. The car was completed by April, and was first run by Emanuele Naspetti at Vallelunga on 26 April 2000; the Italian gave a positive opinion about the new car. Durango lodged an entry (with Naspetti selected to drive) in the third round of the Sports Racing World Cup, held at Spa-Francorchamps in May, but did not attend the event. Instead, the car made its debut, with Andrea de Lorenzi and Soheil Ayari as its drivers, three months later in round six, held at Brno, and took tenth place overall – and eighth in the SR class. Jean-Philippe Belloc replaced Ayari in the next round, held at Donington Park, and this time Durango finished ninth overall, and sixth in class. Ayari returned for the Nürburgring, but a gearbox failure forced the LMP1 into retirement after 52 laps. The driver lineup was unchanged for Magny-Cours, and a sixth place overall (and in class) duly followed. For Kyalami, local driver Earl Goddard replaced de Lorenzi as Ayari's partner, and the pair managed to take fifth overall and in class. Durango finished the season ranked seventh in the SR Team's championship, with 23 points.

=== 2001 ===
The 2001 season started with Goddard attempting to run himself and Ayari in the 24 Hours of Daytona in February; however, they never competed in the race. It would be another five months before another GMS Durango LMP1 entry was lodged; this time, Durango ran the car (driven by Ayari and de Lorenzi) at the fifth round of the FIA Sportscar Championship, which was the Magny-Cours race. However, the BMW engine turned sour, and the team were unable to start the race. Durango attempted to run the pair in the sixth and eighth rounds of the series, held at Donington Park and Nürburgring respectively, but didn't run in either event. The team then entered the 6 Hours of Vallelunga, a non-championship event; with Gabriele de Bono and Marco Cioci behind the wheel, they won the SR1 class (by virtue of being the only SR1 entrant), and took second overall.

=== 2002 ===
Durango made one notable change to the LMP1 for the 2002 season; they replaced the BMW V8 engine with a Judd GV4 V10. This did not have a major impact on the car's performance; Mirko Venturi and Alessandro Battaglin took seventh overall, and sixth in the SR1 category. However, this was not a sign of things to come, as a gearbox failure at Estoril, a marshalling error at Brno (where Belloc had been recalled, in place of Venturi), and another gearbox failure at Magny-Cours (Gianmaria Bruni joined the team for this event) saw the team retire from three races on the trot. The team skipped the fifth round of the series, before returning for the sixth, held at Spa-Francorchamps; this time, Bruni and Battaglin were able to finish fifth overall, and in class, despite having a gearbox failure with just over 30 seconds of the allotted race time remaining. Like 2000, Durango finished the season in seventh place in the SR1 Team's championship, albeit with 14 points on this occasion. However, the car would have one last race, at the 6 Hours of Vallelunga; Bruni was partnered by Leonardo Maddalena and Michele Rugolo, and the trio managed to win the race, although they were once again the only SR1 entrant.
