= Lambardi =

Lambardi is an Italian surname. Notable people with the surname include:

- Carlo Lambardi (1559 – 1620), Italian architect of the late-Renaissance and early-Baroque period
- Francesco Lambardi (1587–1642), Neapolitan Baroque composer

== See also ==
- Lombardi (surname)
