= Lombard =

The term Lombard refers to people or things related to Lombardy, a region in northern Italy.

== History and culture ==
- Lombards, a Germanic tribe
- Lombardic language, the Germanic language spoken by the Lombards
- Lombards of Sicily, a linguistic minority living in Sicily, southern Italy
- Lombard League, a medieval alliance of some 30 cities in Northern Italy
- Lombard language, a Gallo-Italic language spoken in Northern Italy and southern Switzerland
  - Old Lombard, the form of the Lombard language from the 13th and 14th centuries
- Lombardic capitals, a decorative lettering style originally used in medieval manuscripts

== Businesses ==
- ICICI Lombard, an insurance company in India
- Le Lombard (or Editions Lombard), a Belgian comic book publisher
- Lombard Bank, a bank in Malta
- Lombard North Central, a finance house in the United Kingdom

== Places ==
France

- Lombard, Doubs, a commune of the Doubs département
- Lombard, Jura, a commune of the Jura département

United States

- Lombard, Illinois
  - Lombard station
- Lombard, Montana
- Lombard, Wisconsin

== Other uses ==
- Lombard (surname)
- Lombard (gun), an early cannon
- Lombard Street (disambiguation)
- Automobiles Lombard, a French automobile manufacturer in the 1920s
- Lombard Steam Log Hauler
- Lombard, codename of the third generation PowerBook G3 laptop computers made by Apple Computer from 1999 to 2001
- the title character of Anna Lombard, a 1901 novel by Annie Sophie Cory
- Lombard (band), a Polish rock band
- "Lombard" (Miami Vice), an episode from the Miami Vice television series
- Lombard College, a now defunct institution of higher education in Galesburg, Illinois
- Lombard (grape), another name for the German/Italian wine grape Trollinger
  - Enfariné noir, French wine grape also known as Lombard
- Lombard (magazine), an Italian business magazine

== See also ==
- Lombard banking, a form of medieval banking
- Lombard credit, a form of lending used by central banks
- Lombard effect, a phenomenon in which a speaker or singer involuntarily raises his or her vocal intensity in the presence of high levels of sound
- Lombard rhythm, a musical rhythm, especially used in Baroque music
- Lombardo, a family name
- Lombardi (disambiguation)
