= Lombardozzi =

Lombardozzi is an Italian surname. It comes from a derivative of Lombardo. Notable people with the surname include:

- Carmine Lombardozzi (1913–1992), member of the Gambino crime family in New York
- Domenick Lombardozzi (born 1976), American actor
- Steve Lombardozzi (born 1960), American baseball player
- Steve Lombardozzi Jr. (born 1988), American baseball player, son of Steve

== See also ==
- Lombardo
