= Lombardi =

Lombardi may refer to:

- Lombardi (surname)
- Lombardi (play), a Broadway play
- Lombardi (film), a 2010 television documentary
- I lombardi alla Prima Crociata, an opera by Verdi
- Lombardi Software was an enterprise software company based in Austin, Texas
- Lombardi's, first pizzeria in the United States
- Lombardy, a region of Italy
- Georgetown Lombardi Comprehensive Cancer Center, a cancer center in Washington, D.C.
- Falco Lombardi, a fictional character
- Vince Lombardi Trophy: awarded to the winning team of the Super Bowl

== See also ==
- Lombardo
- Lombards
- Longobardi (disambiguation)
- Lombard (disambiguation)
