= Lombard Street =

Lombard Street may refer to:

== Roads ==
- Lombard Street, London, England
- Rue des Lombards, Paris, France
- Lombard Street, Petworth, shopping street in Petworth

=== United States ===
- Lombard Street (San Francisco), California, steep with hairpin turns
- Lombard Street (Baltimore), Maryland
- Lombard Street (Philadelphia), Pennsylvania
  - See also Lombard Street riot
- Lombard Street (Portland, Oregon), part of US 30 Bypass

== Other uses ==
- Lombard Street: A Description of the Money Market, a book by Walter Bagehot
