= Pedro Lombardía =

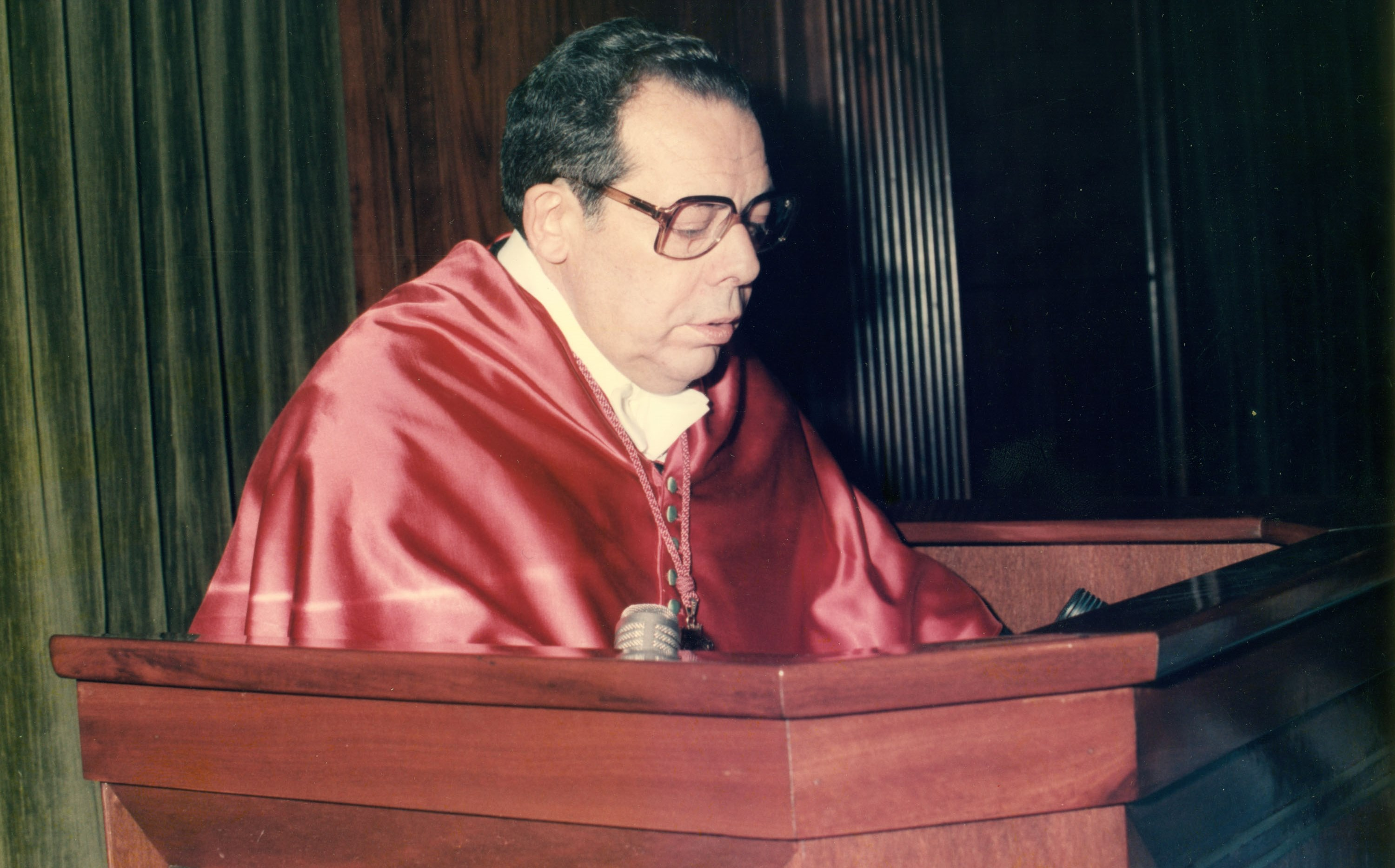

Pedro Lombardía (Córdoba, 1930 Pamplona, 1986) was a Spanish canonist and pioneer of the Study of State Ecclesiastical Law in Spain. He held the chairs of Canon Law and State Ecclesiastical Law at the University of Navarra and the Complutense University of Madrid.

Lombardía was the founder of the School of Lombardía, a group of canonists who advocated for a methodological modernization of canon law. Lombardía and his followers shared an interest of overcoming the exegetical method to and replace by the systematic approach with the Italian School of Canon Law but disagree with their theory of canonizatio according to which the ultimate criteria of unity of the canonic order is in the acts of the ecclesiastical authority. For the school of Lombardía the theory of canonizatio necessarily implies the acceptance of legal positivism and the conditioning of the binding character of the divine law (natural and positive) to an act of authority.

Another central concern in the work of Lombardía is the need to complement the traditional view of canon law as a discipline with a perspective based on the freedoms and rights of members of the Catholic Church. This concern led him to develop a theory of the fundamental rights of the members of the church, which is one of the influences of the second title of the current 1983 Code of Canon Law.

In his later years Lombardía was especially devoted himself to the study of State Ecclesiastical Law.

== Publications ==
- El derecho del Pueblo de Dios (with Javier Hervada)
- Lecciones De Derecho Canonico: Introduccion Derecho Constitucional. Parte General
- He also wrote numerous articles compiled in "Escritos de Derecho Canónico y de Derecho Eclesiástico del Estado," a collection of five volumes published by the University of Navarra.
