= Lella Lombardi =

Italian racing driver (1941–1992)

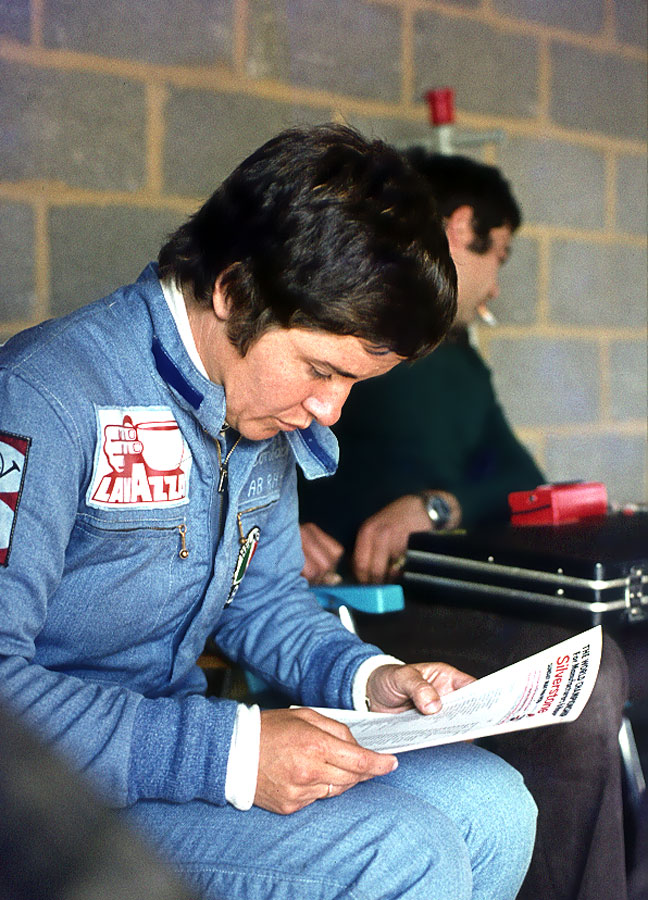
- Lombardi in 1976
- Born: Maria Grazia Lombardi; 26 March 1941; Frugarolo, Piedmont, Italy
- Died: 3 March 1992 (aged 50); Milan, Italy

Formula One World Championship career
- Nationality: (Italy) Italian
- Active years: 1974–1976
- Team(s): March, RAM, Williams, Brabham
- Entries: 17 (12 starts)
- Championships: 0
- Wins: 0
- Podiums: 0
- Career points: 0.5
- Pole positions: 0
- Fastest laps: 0
- First entry: 1974 British Grand Prix
- Last entry: 1976 Austrian Grand Prix

Maria Grazia "Lella" Lombardi (26 March 1941 – 3 March 1992) was an Italian racing driver who participated in 17 Formula One World Championship Grands Prix from 1974 to 1976. Lombardi was the second female driver to qualify for Formula One, after Maria Teresa de Filippis, and is the only female driver who finished within the points in Formula One, having scored half a point in the 1975 Spanish Grand Prix. Lombardi was also the first woman to qualify and compete in the Race of Champions at Brands Hatch, and raced in sports cars. She won the 1979 6 Hours of Pergusa, the 1979 6 Hours of Vallelunga and the 1981 6 Hours of Mugello, and finished second in her class at the 1976 24 Hours of Le Mans.

== Early life ==
Lombardi was born in Frugarolo, a small town in Piedmont Italy on 26 March 1941. She was the youngest child of three; her father was a butcher, who gave Lella her first job as a delivery driver for the family's shop. At first, Lombardi’s father initially found her passion for racing hard to accept, but he embraced it once she finished runner-up in a 1968 race.

== Career ==
=== Early career ===
After a brief experience with karting as a child, Lombardi bought her first car in 1965, which she raced in the Formula Monza series. She moved on to Formula Three in 1968, and in 1970 won the Italian Formula 850 series. In 1974, Lombardi was signed to drive the Shellsport-Luxembourg Lola in Formula 5000 and finished fourth.

=== Formula One ===
In 1974, Lombardi tried, unsuccessfully, to qualify for Formula One with a privately entered Brabham racing car supported by the Automobile Club d'Italia. The car was sponsored by Radio Luxembourg broadcasting on 208 meters mediumwave, which inspired the selection of 208 as Lombardi's Formula One racing number. That winter, she met an Italian nobleman, Count Vittorio Zanon, who sponsored her entrance into Formula One. In 1975, Lombardi was invited to join Vittorio Brambilla and Hans-Joachim Stuck on the March engineering team, racing the full season with Zanon's Lavazza Coffee Company’s sponsorship.

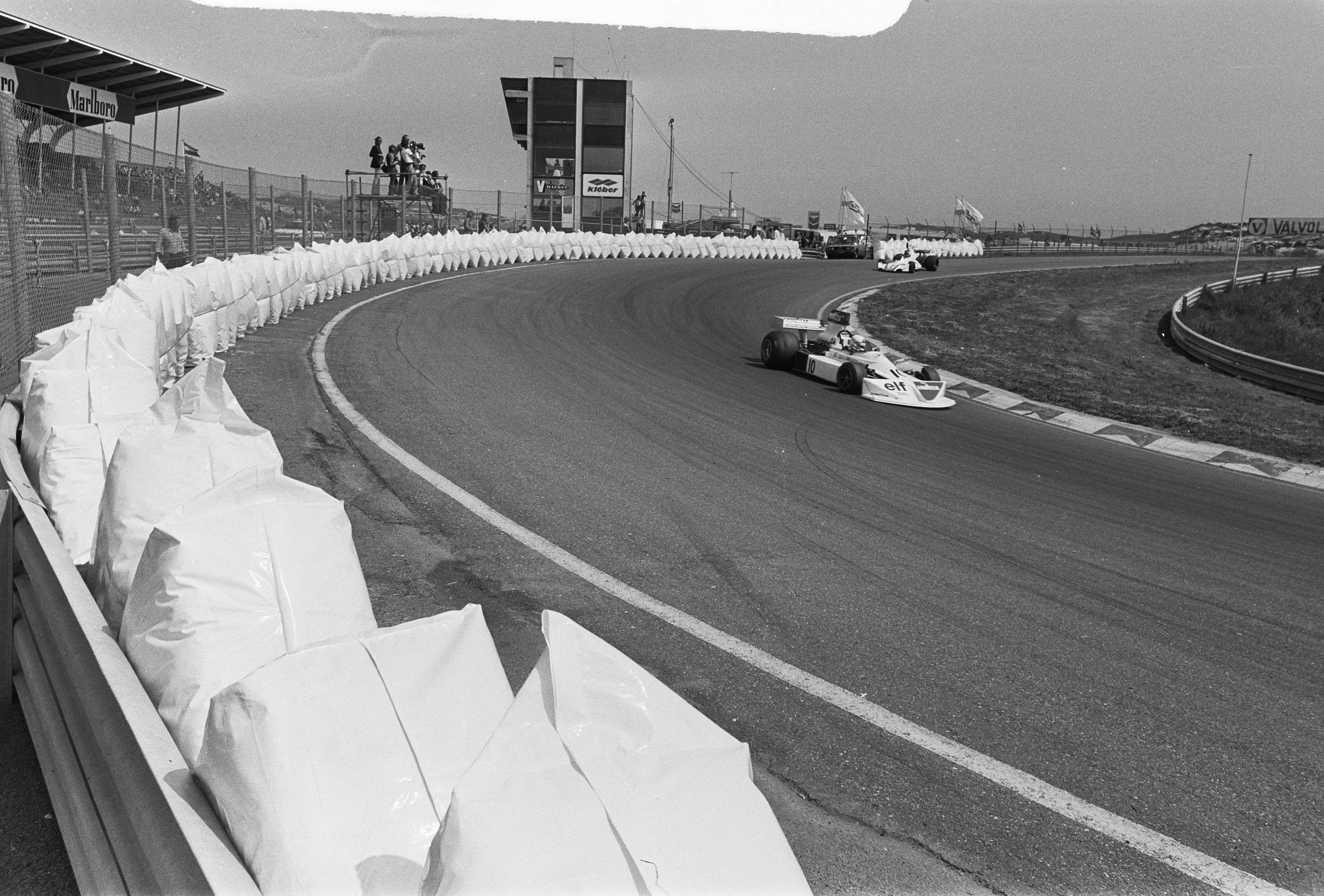
Lombardi driving a March 751 Formula One car in practice for the 1975 Dutch Grand Prix

At the opening race of the campaign in South Africa, Lombardi became the first woman since Maria Teresa de Filippis in 1958 to successfully qualify for a Grand Prix. 1975 would prove to be an eventful season for the March Team, as Lombardi scored half a Championship point in the Spanish Grand Prix. This was because the race only lasted 23 laps until Lombardi was forced to retire with a fuel system problem, while the race suffered a major tragedy when the rear wing on Rolf Stommelen's Embassy Hill broke, sending him into the barrier. While trying to avoid Stommelen's car as it bounced back and crossed the track, Carlos Pace crashed. Four spectators were killed by Stommelen's flying car. The race continued for another four laps, resulting in Lombardi’s sixth-place finish and, with the race being stopped before three-fifths of the scheduled race distance was reached, all points were halved. Lombardi also successfully performed at other races, including the German Grand Prix at the Nürburgring, where she finished seventh. At the United States Grand Prix at Watkins Glen, Lombardi had a one-off drive for Williams. However, she was prevented from starting the race due to an ignition problem.

In 1976, Lombardi was confirmed at March Engineering alongside Brambilla and Stuck. She finished 14th at the Brazilian Grand Prix that year, and subsequently, the team decided to replace her with Ronnie Peterson. Then, Lombardi briefly moved to RAM Racing, her best result being 12th at the Austrian Grand Prix.

=== Race of Champions ===
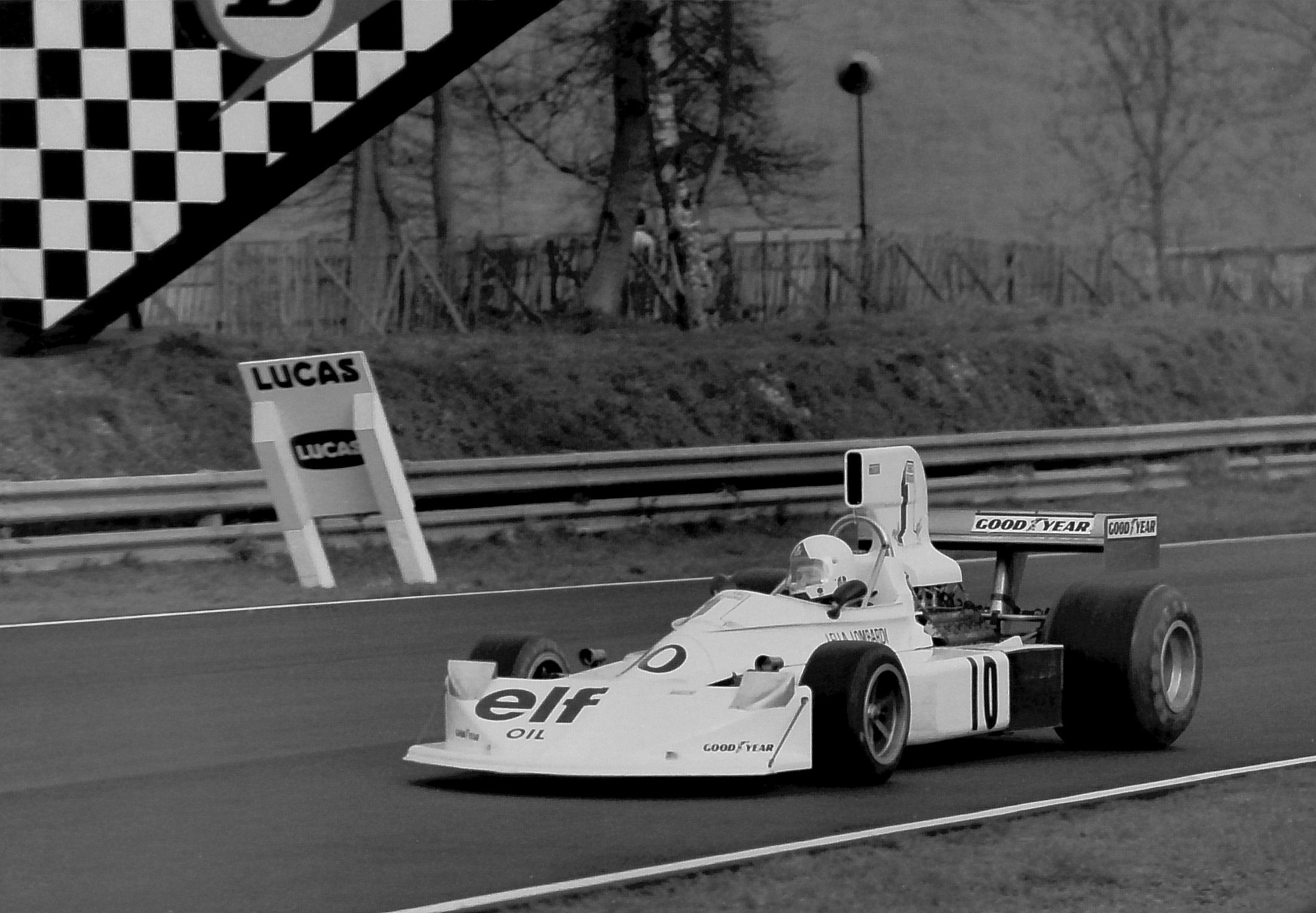
Lombardi at the 1975 Race of Champions driving a March 751

In 1974, Lombardi was the first female racing driver to qualify and compete at the Race of Champions in Brands Hatch. She raced a Lola-Chevrolet Grand Touring Prototype-class car and finished 14th. In the 1975 event, she was once again able to qualify and compete with a March-Ford car. She retired after 20 laps.

=== Sports cars ===
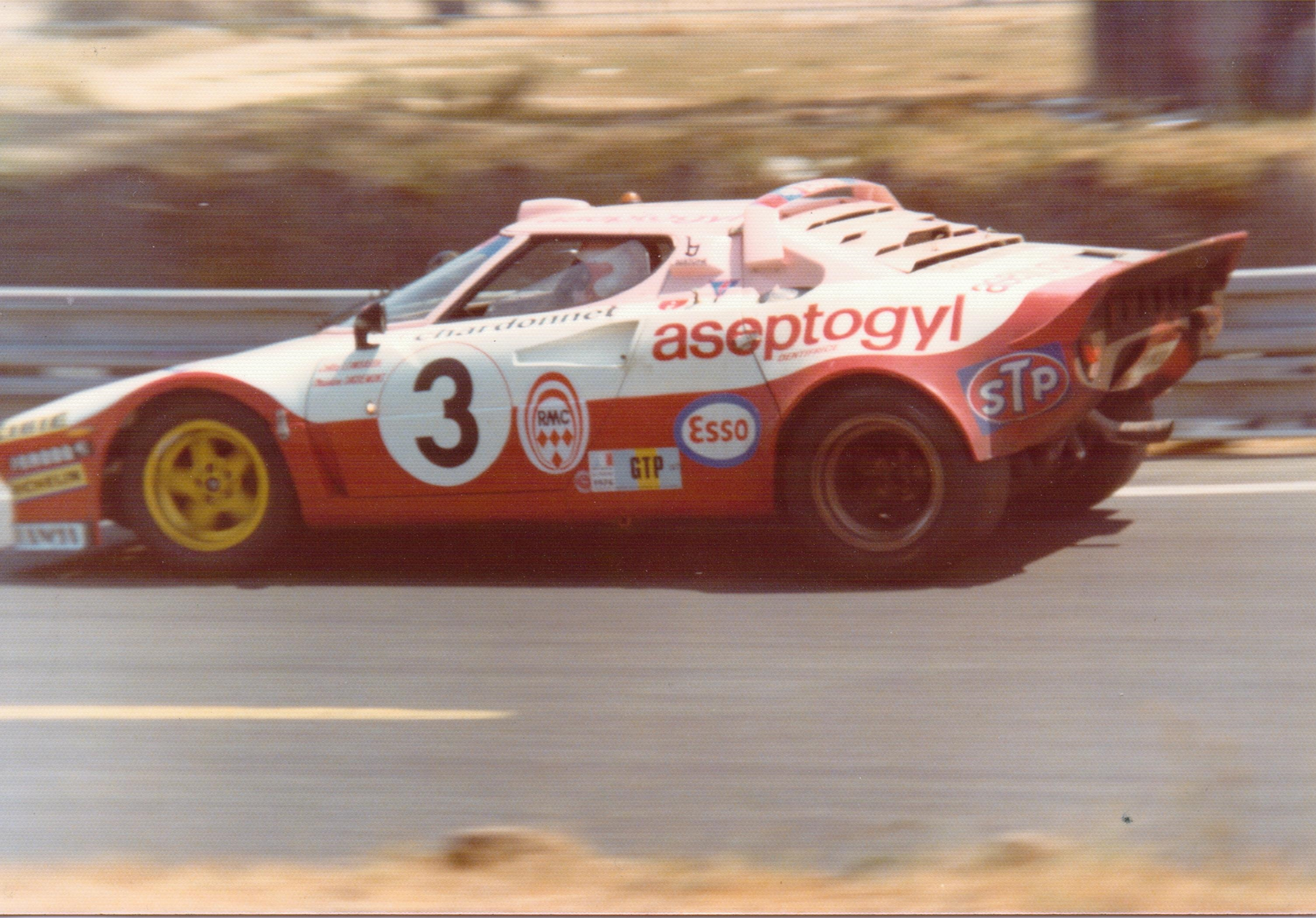
Lombardi's Lancia Stratos competing in the 1976 24 Hours of Le Mans

Lombardi later raced in sports cars. In 1979, she won the 6 Hours of Pergusa and the 6 Hours of Vallelunga; in 1981, she won the 6 Hours of Mugello. She competed four times at the 24 Hours of Le Mans, where she finished 20th overall (and second in the GTP class) in 1976 in a Lancia Stratos Turbo. She also finished with podium places in a number of other European endurance races: third at Casale, 1974; third at the Imola 250 kilometers, 1977; second at Wunstorf, 1979; second at Ulm, 1979; second at the Monza 1,000 kilometers, 1981; second at the 6 Hours of Pergusa, 1981; and third at the Donington 500 kilometers, 1981.

Lombardi also raced in the Firecracker 400 NASCAR race at the Daytona International Speedway in 1977. There were two other female drivers in the field: American Janet Guthrie and Belgian Christine Beckers. Lombardi finished 31st.

Lombardi retired from racing in 1988. In 1989, she founded her own racing team, Lombardi Autosport.

== Personal life and death ==
Journalist Phil Pash reported that though Lombardi viewed racing as a masculine sport, she succeeded regardless because of her 'competitive spirit.'

Lombardi was one of the first female racers openly in a same-sex relationship. Lombardi died of breast cancer in Milan on 3 March 1992. She was 50 years old and was buried in Frugarolo. She was survived by her partner, Fiorenza. Lombardi is commemorated by a sculpture in her birthplace, Frugarolo.

== Legacy ==
Women have competed in motorsport (and Grand Prix racing in particular) since the birth of the sport. Some notable examples are Camille du Gast, Maria Antonietta Avanzo, Elisabeth Junek or Hellé Nice, all of them in the 1900-1940 period. Lombardi’s racing career has influenced the perceptions of subsequent generations of women in racing; she is credited with making Formula One accessible to women. Lombardi is considered a Formula One trailblazer, after which women have increasingly joined Formula One in many capacities aside from race driving, including as test drivers and development drivers, engineers and strategists. Lombardi is considered one of the reference points for women in racing; Lombardi and de Filippis are the only two women to have started in world championship Grands Prix races, with Lombardi the only one to have achieved a point-scoring finish.

There have been three subsequent female Formula One drivers: Divina Galica (during 1976, Lombardi's third and final season in Formula One), Desiré Wilson (1980) and Giovanna Amati (1992).

=== Film ===
In 2020, the film "Beyond Driven" was made by directors Riyaana Hartley and Vincent Tran, providing essentially a dramatised documentary-style biographical account of Lombardi's life.

It features Patrizia Lombardi (Lella Lombardi's niece), Tatiana Calderon, Amna Al Qubaisi, Vicky Piria, Alice Powell, Giovanna Amati, Carmen Jorda, and Beitske Visser.

== Racing record ==
=== Complete European F5000/British Formula One Championship results ===
(key) (Races in bold indicate pole position; races in italics indicate fastest lap.)

Year	Entrant	Chassis	Engine	1	2	3	4	5	6	7	8	9	10	11	12	13	14	15	16	17	18	Pos.	Pts
1974	ShellSPORT Luxembourg	Lola T330	Chevrolet 5.0 V8	BRH; 4	MAL; Ret	SIL; 10	OUL; 5	BRH; 8	ZOL; Ret	THR; 9	ZAN; 7	MUG; 6	MNZ; 4	MAL; 7	MON; 6	THR; 6	BRH; 10	OUL; 4	SNE; 5	MAL; 4	BRH; DNS	5th	88
1976	Team P R Reilly	Shadow DN1	Ford Cosworth DFV 3.0 V8	MAL	SNE	OUL; NC	BRH; 9	THR	BRH	MAL	SNE	BRH	THR	OUL	BRH	BRH						42nd	2
1979	Team Agostini	Williams FW06	Ford Cosworth DFV 3.0 V8	ZOL	OUL	BRH	MAL; 14	SNE	THR	ZAN	DON	OUL	NOG	MAL	BRH	THR	SNE	SIL				NC	0

=== Complete Formula One World Championship results ===
(key) (Races in bold indicate pole position; races in italics indicate fastest lap.)

Year	Entrant	Chassis	Engine	1	2	3	4	5	6	7	8	9	10	11	12	13	14	15	16	WDC	Pts
1974	Allied Polymer Group	Brabham BT42	Ford Cosworth DFV 3.0 V8	ARG	BRA	RSA	ESP	BEL	MON	SWE	NED	FRA	GBR; DNQ	GER	AUT	CAN	ITA	USA		NC	0
1975	March Engineering	March 741	Ford Cosworth DFV 3.0 V8	ARG	BRA	RSA; Ret														21st	0.5
1975	Lavazza March	March 751	Ford Cosworth DFV 3.0 V8				ESP; 6	MON; DNQ	BEL; Ret	SWE; Ret	NED; 14	FRA; 18	GBR; Ret	GER; 7	AUT; 17	ITA; Ret				21st	0.5
1975	Frank Williams Racing Cars	Williams FW04	Ford Cosworth DFV 3.0 V8														USA; DNS			21st	0.5
1976	Lavazza March	March 761	Ford Cosworth DFV 3.0 V8	BRA; 14	RSA	USW	ESP	BEL	MON	SWE	FRA									NC	0
1976	RAM Racing with Lavazza	Brabham BT44B	Ford Cosworth DFV 3.0 V8									GBR; DNQ	GER; DNQ	AUT; 12	NED	ITA	CAN	USA	JPN	NC	0

=== Formula One non-championship results ===
(key) (Races in bold indicate pole position; races in italics indicate fastest lap.)

Year	Entrant	Chassis	Engine	1	2	3
1974	ShellSPORT Luxembourg	Lola T330	Chevrolet 5.0 V8	PRE	ROC; NC	INT; 13
1975	Lavazza March	March 751	Ford Cosworth DFV 3.0 V8	ROC; Ret	INT; 12	SUI

=== 24 Hours of Le Mans results ===
Year	Team	Co-Drivers	Car	Class	Laps	Pos.	Class Pos.
1975	Elf Switzerland	(France) Marie-Claude Charmasson	Renault-Alpine A441	S 2.0	20	DNF	DNF
1976	(France) Aseptogyl	(France) Christine Dacremont	Lancia Stratos-Ferrari	GTP	265	20th	**2nd**
1977	(France) Inaltera	(Belgium) Christine Beckers	Inaltera LM-Ford Cosworth	S +2.0	279	11th	4th
1980	(Italy) Scuderia Torino Corse	(United Kingdom) Mark Thatcher	Osella PA8-BMW	S 2.0	157	DNF	DNF

=== NASCAR ===
(key) (Bold – Pole position awarded by qualifying time. Italics – Pole position earned by points standings or practice time. * – Most laps led.)

==== Winston Cup Series ====
NASCAR Winston Cup Series results
Year	Team	No.	Make	1	2	3	4	5	6	7	8	9	10	11	12	13	14	15	16	17	18	19	20	21	22	23	24	25	26	27	28	29	30	NWCC	Pts	Ref
1977	Charles Dean	05	Chevy	RSD	DAY	RCH	CAR	ATL	NWS	DAR	BRI	MAR	TAL	NSV	DOV	CLT	RSD	MCH	DAY; 31	NSV	POC	TAL	MCH	BRI	DAR	RCH	DOV	MAR	NWS	CLT	CAR	ATL	ONT	N/A	0	

=== Complete Deutsche Tourenwagen Meisterschaft results ===
(key) (Races in bold indicate pole position) (Races in italics indicate fastest lap)

Year	Team	Car	1	2	3	4	5	6	7	8	9	10	11	12	13	14	15	Pos.	Pts
1984		Alfa Romeo Alfetta GTV6	ZOL	HOC	AVU	AVU	MFA	WUN	NÜR	NÜR	NOR	NÜR	DIE	HOC; 10	HOC; 6	ZOL	NÜR	NC	0

== See also ==
- List of female Formula One drivers
