= Phil Gilbert (English footballer) =

English footballer (born 1944)

Personal information
- Full name: Philip Leonard Gilbert
- Date of birth: 11 September 1944 (age 82)
- Place of birth: Minster-in-Thanet, England
- Height: 5 ft 10 in (1.78 m)
- Position: Wing half

Senior career*
Years	Team	Apps	(Gls)
1960–1961	Margate	0	(0)
1961–1962	Ramsgate Athletic		
1962–1964	Brighton & Hove Albion	6	(3)
1964–1972	Salisbury		(33)
1977	Margate	0	(0)
1980–1981	Margate	20	(0)

Managerial career
- 1981–1982: Ramsgate
- * Club domestic league appearances and goals

Philip Leonard Gilbert (born 11 September 1944) is an English former professional footballer who played as an inside forward in the Football League for Brighton & Hove Albion.

Gilbert was born in 1944 in Minster-in-Thanet, in east Kent. He began his career with Margate's reserves, played Southern League football for Ramsgate Athletic, and signed for Brighton & Hove Albion as a 17-year-old in January 1962. He made his Football League Second Division debut that April, with Brighton already relegated, and played five more league matches over the next two years, scoring three goals. He was then released to join Western League club Salisbury, where he spent eight years, helping them earn election to the Southern League in 1968 and playing more than 300 matches. He returned to Kent, playing occasionally for Margate's reserves and finally, in 1981 at the age of 36, made his first-team debut for the club, playing at right back for the last 20 matches of the 1980–81 Southern League Southern Division season. He later managed Ramsgate and served on the committee of the Margate club in its Thanet United era.
