= Maria Longobardi (physicist) =

Italian physicist

Maria "Marilena" Longobardi is an Italian physicist who works in Switzerland in the Department of Physics at the University of Basel, where she is scientific coordinator and managing director of the National Center of Competence in Research SPIN. Her research has focused on the quantum and electronic properties of linear and two-dimensional materials, including semiconductors and hybrid biomaterials.

Longobardi completed a Ph.D. in 2010 jointly through the University of Salerno and the University of California, Berkeley. After postdoctoral research at the Istituto Italiano di Tecnologia, she joined the University of Geneva in Switzerland as a researcher in 2011, initially in the physics department but from 2016 to 2020 in the microbiology department. During this period she also earned a master's degree in microbiology. After serving from 2019 to 2021 in China as Chief of International Relations for the Beijing Academy of Quantum Information Sciences, she moved to the University of Basel to become scientific coordinator for NCCR SPIN in 2021.

In the American Physical Society, Longobardi founded the Forum on Early Career Scientists in 2016, and has also chaired the Topical Group on Data Science. She was named a Fellow of the American Physical Society in 2022, "for the support and promotion of early-career scientists and international relationships through unflagging efforts to bring people together and publicize high-quality research from all corners of the world".
