= Longobardo =

Longobardo is a surname. Notable people with the surname include:

- Anna Kazanjian Longobardo (1928–2020), former director of the engineering firm Woodward Clyde Group and a former executive at Unisys Corp
- Nicolò Longobardo (1559–1654), Sicilian Jesuit in China in the 17th century
- Primo Longobardo (1901–1942), Italian naval officer and submariner during World War II

== See also ==
- Longobardi (surname)
