= Maria Antonietta Avanzo =

Italian racetrack driver

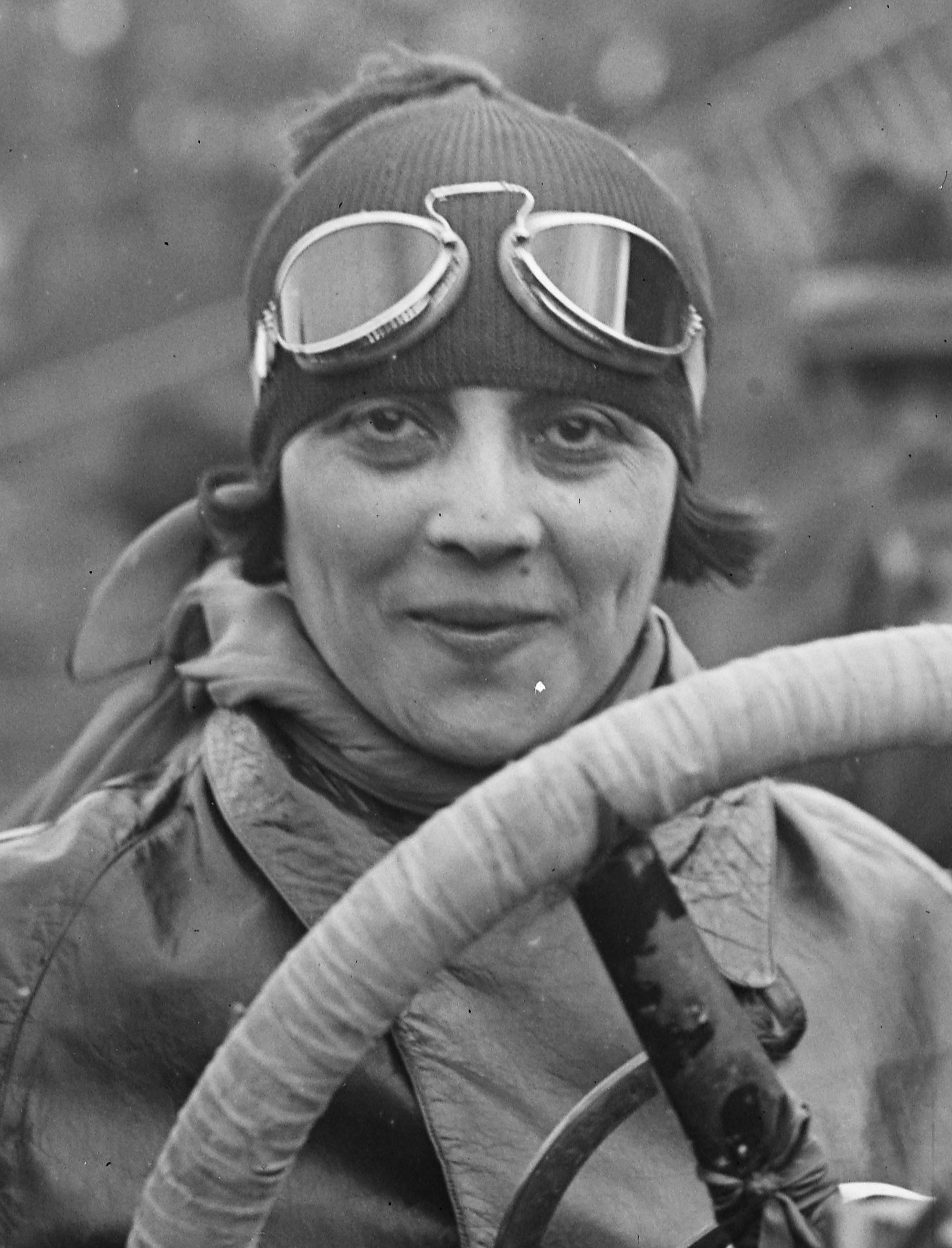
- Maria Antonietta Avanzo in 1922
- Born: Maria Antonietta Avanzo; 5 February 1889; Porto Viro, Italy
- Died: 17 January 1977 (aged 87); Italy
- Occupation: Racecar driver
- Years active: 1920-1940
- Spouse: Eustachio Avanzo
- Children: 2

Maria Antonietta Avanzo (née Bellan) (5 February 1889 – 17 January 1977) was the first Italian female racetrack driver. Widely regarded as "the most famous Italian woman racing driver of the inter-war period", she competed in numerous events throughout her career, including the Targa Florio and the Mille Miglia. In 1921, she famously drove a twelve-cylinder Packard 299 on the beach of the island of Fanø, in Denmark. Throughout her career she fought for the right to compete to motor racing events – until then largely reserved to men – and became an activist for women's equality and a symbol of early feminism.

== Early life ==
Maria Antonietta Bellan was born on 5 February 1889 at Contarina, now Porto Viro, near Rovigo. She learned to drive on her father's De Dion-Bouton tricycle. In 1908, she married Eustachio Avanzo, a wealthy landowner and publisher, with whom she had two children, Luisa (b. 1909) and Renzo (b. 1911). Shortly before World War One, the family relocated to Rome. Both her father and her husband encouraged her driving talents, and in 1920 Eustachio bought her a 35 hp SPA sportscar to race.

== Career ==
In 1920 Avanzo made her racing debut at the wheel of the SPA 35/50 in the Giro del Lazio. Despite having to replace an errant wheel during the event, she was able to win her class. Later in the same year, she entered the Targa Florio in a Buick, but did not finish, having had to retire during the third lap.

In 1921 Avanzo won the women's cup at the Brescia "Motor Sport Week". In July she drove a twelve-cylinder Packard in a sand race meeting on the beaches of the island of Fanø, in Denmark. When the car caught fire while travelling at full speed, Avanzo drove it into the sea to quench the flames. According to Enzo Ferrari, Antonio Ascari, who was attending the event and was deeply impressed with Avanzo's performance, overheard her remarking that she'd be happy to swap her Packard for a Fiat as she emerged from the water. On her return home, Avanzo found a bright red Fiat awaiting her, and Ascari got the Packard which was repaired and put back into use. In 1921, she entered an Ansaldo 4CS as Tazio Nuvolari's teammate, and finished 7th (3rd in class) at the Circuito di Garda.

In 1922 Avanzo and her family emigrated to Australia, where she set up a farming business at Quakers Hill, New South Wales. She returned to Europe in 1926. In the 1930s she drove Alfa Romeos, Maseratis and Bugattis in many events, including the Rocca di Papa hill climb, and the 24 Hours of Le Mans. In 1932 she attempted to qualify a Miller at the Indianapolis 500. In 1939 she entered the Tobruk-Tripoli where she finished sixth in the 1100cc class driving a Fiat.

Avanzo regularly competed to the Mille Miglia. Her first attempt took place in 1928, driving a Chrysler Tipo 72 with Manuel de Teffé. They did not finish after suffering a mechanical failure. The following year, she teamed up with Carlo Bruno and drove an Alfa Romeo 6C 1750 SS. Again, she was forced to retire. In 1931 she made another attempt at the Mille Miglia, in a Bugatti T43, driving with Count Carlo Castelbarco. Avanzo's final Mille Miglia was in 1932. In 1940 she entered a Fiat 1100 with Angelo Della Cella, but did not start the race.

Following the start of World War Two, Avanzo retired from racing. Her career inspired many other Italian women to follow her example, including Lia Comirato Dumas, Jole Venturi, Corinna Braccialini, Anna Maria Peduzzi, and Dorina Colonna.

== See also ==
- INDOMITA, la straordinaria vita di Maria Antonietta Avanzo (INDOMITE, the extraordinary life of Maria Antonietta Avanzo) by Luca Malin (2013)
