= Maria Longobardi (mathematician) =

Italian mathematician

Maria Longobardi is an Italian mathematician. After early work in functional analysis, her research has focused on mathematical statistics, information theory, entropy, and extropy.

Longobardi earned a laurea (the Italian equivalent of a master's degree) from the University of Naples Federico II. She became a research fellow at the Istituto Nazionale di Alta Matematica Francesco Severi, and then for the National Research Council (Italy), before becoming an assistant at the University of Naples from 2000 to 2019. During this time, in 2002, she completed her Ph.D., with the dissertation Su alcuni risultati in teoria dell'affidabilità basati sulla funzione d'azzardo inversa [Some results on reliability theory based on reversed hazard rate function] supervised by Antonio Di Crescenzo. She has been an associate professor at the University of Naples Federico II since 2019.
