= Pietro Lombardi =

Pietro Lombardi is the name of:

- Pietro Lombardi (architect) (1894–1984), Italian architect
- Pietro Lombardi (wrestler) (1922–2011), Italian wrestler
- Pietro Lombardi (singer) (born 1992), German singer
