= March 731 =

Formula One car

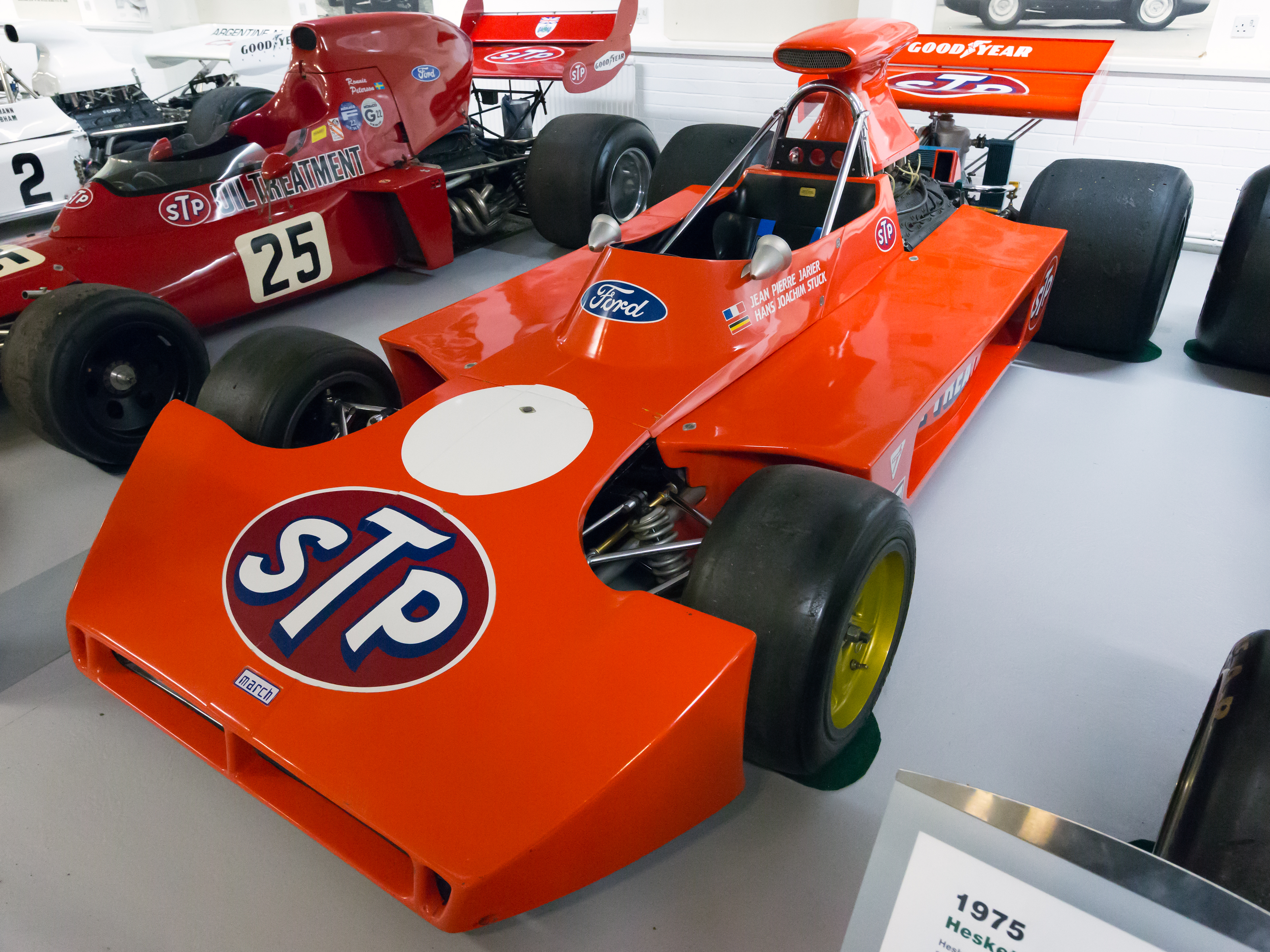
- Category: Formula One
- Constructor: March Engineering
- Designer: Robin Herd
- Predecessor: March 721
- Successor: March 741

Technical specifications
- Chassis: Aluminium monocoque
- Axle track: 1,448 mm (57.0 in) (Front); 1,448 mm (57.0 in) (Rear)
- Wheelbase: 2,438 mm (96.0 in)
- Engine: Ford-Cosworth DFV 2,993 cc (182.6 cu in) 90° V8 naturally aspirated mid-mounted
- Transmission: 1976: Hewland DG 400 6-speed manual. 1977: Hewland FGA 400 6-speed manual.
- Weight: 1,270 lb (580 kg)
- Tyres: Goodyear; Firestone

Competition history
- Notable entrants: March Engineering
- Debut: 1973 Spanish Grand Prix
Races	Wins	Podiums	Poles	F/Laps
15	0	2	0	2
- Constructors' Championships: 0
- Drivers' Championships: 0
- Unless otherwise stated, all data refer to Formula One World Championship Grands Prix only.

The March 731 was a Formula One racing car designed by Robin Herd of March Engineering for the 1973 season which saw continued use through 1974. While unsuccessful in the hands of the works team, private entrant Hesketh Racing had some success with James Hunt driving.

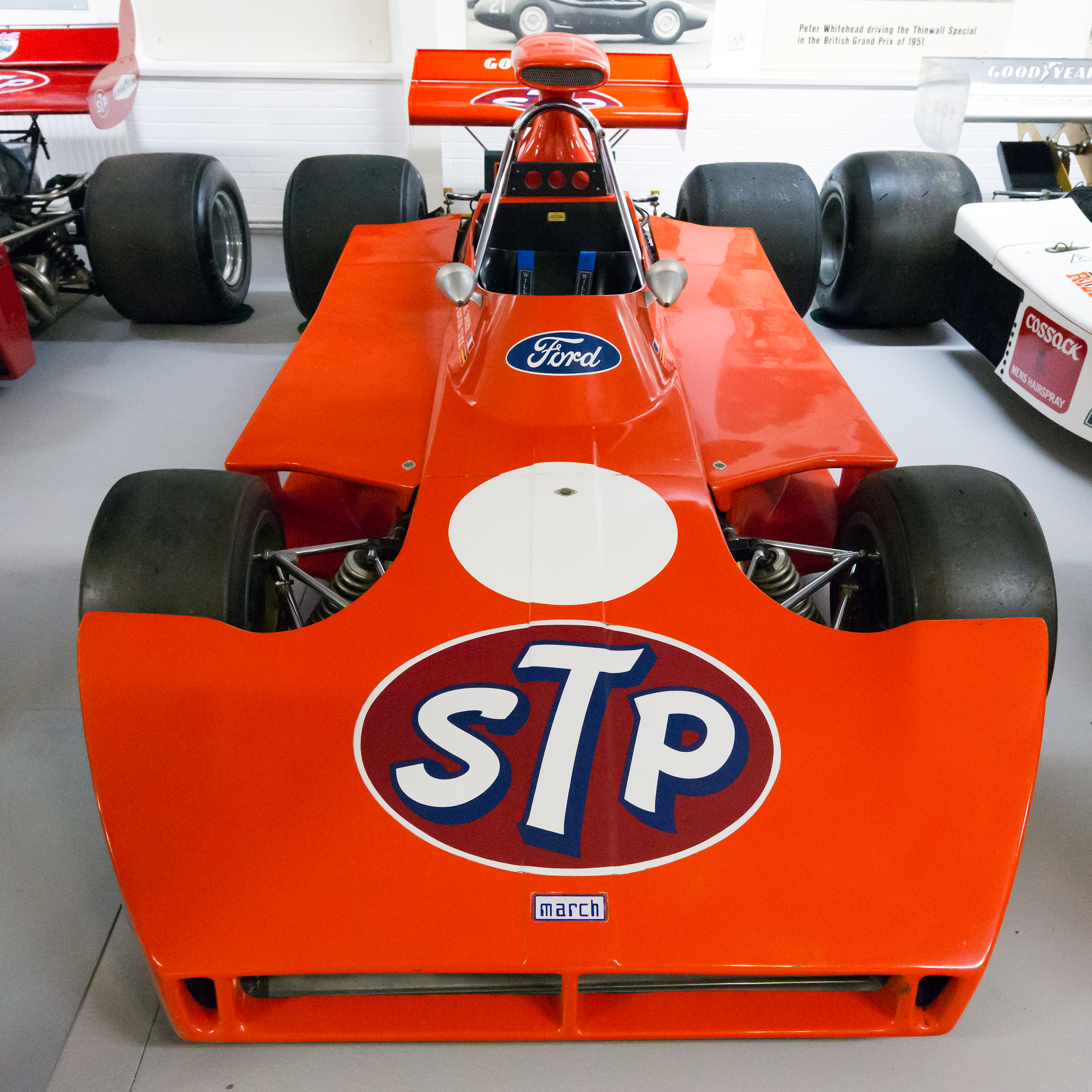
March 731 front-view

== Design history ==
March had expended much time and effort in developing the previous season's 721 model, and so for 1973 they modified the existing 721G models, moving the radiator to the front and revising the bodywork.

== Racing history ==
The works' 731 was primarily raced by Jean-Pierre Jarier without much success, and various private teams fared little better, with the notable exception of Hesketh Racing. Their car, driven by James Hunt in his first season in F1, had various modifications carried out by designer Harvey Postlethwaite, who had been recruited from March by Hesketh. Hunt finished third in the Dutch Grand Prix and second in the United States Grand Prix, and with two other finishes in the points ended up in eighth place in the World Championship. Hunt's success contributed entirely to March's fifth place in the 1973 Constructors' Championship.

Roger Williamson, driving for the works team, was killed when his 731 overturned and caught fire at the Dutch Grand Prix.

== Complete Formula One results ==
(key)

Year	Entrant	Engine	Tyres	Drivers	1	2	3	4	5	6	7	8	9	10	11	12	13	14	15	Points	WCC
1973	March Racing Team	Cosworth DFV	G		ARG	BRA	RSA	ESP	BEL	MON	SWE	FRA	GBR	NED	GER	AUT	ITA	CAN	USA	14	5th
1973	March Racing Team	Cosworth DFV	G	Henri Pescarolo				8												14	5th
1973	March Racing Team	Cosworth DFV	G	Jean-Pierre Jarier					Ret	Ret	Ret	Ret				Ret		NC	11	14	5th
1973	March Racing Team	Cosworth DFV	G	Roger Williamson									Ret	Ret						14	5th
1973	Clarke-Mordaunt-Guthrie-Durlacher	Cosworth DFV	G	Mike Beuttler				7	11	Ret	8		11	Ret	16	Ret	Ret	Ret	10	14	5th
1973	Team Pierre Robert	Cosworth DFV	G	Reine Wisell							DNS	Ret								14	5th
1973	LEC Refrigeration Racing	Cosworth DFV	G	David Purley						Ret			DNS	Ret	15		9			14	5th
1973	Hesketh Racing	Cosworth DFV	G	James Hunt						9		6	4	3		Ret	DNS	7	2	14	5th
1974	Hesketh Racing	Cosworth DFV	G		ARG	BRA	RSA	ESP	BEL	MON	SWE	NED	FRA	GBR	GER	AUT	ITA	CAN	USA	6*	9th
1974	Hesketh Racing	Cosworth DFV	G	James Hunt	Ret	9														6*	9th
1974	Dempster International Racing Team	Cosworth DFV	G	Mike Wilds										DNQ						6*	9th

* All points scored by other March chassis
