= Phil Gilbert (design executive) =

American business executive (born 1956)

- Born: September 8, 1956 (age 70); Oklahoma City, Oklahoma, U.S.
- Education: University of Oklahoma (BS)
- Occupations: Speaker, Author, Consultant, Executive
- Spouse: Lisa (2001–present)
- Children: 4

Phil Gafford Gilbert Sr. is an American executive and design leader specializing in corporate culture. He spent 30 years as a start-up entrepreneur before IBM appointed him as their General Manager of Design in 2012 to spearhead a broad transformation of the company and was the subject of the documentary film The Loop. He also wrote a book Irresistible Change: A Blueprint for Earning Buy-In and Breakout Success about his experiences at IBM.

Gilbert retired in 2021 but remains active as an author, consultant, lecturer, and member of various boards of directors.

== Early life and education ==
Gilbert was born and raised in Oklahoma City. As a young man, he worked as a newspaper carrier for The Daily Oklahoman and Oklahoma City Times, attended John Marshall High School, and graduated as a Pe-et (top ten) senior from the University of Oklahoma in 1978.

== Career ==
Gilbert managed a variety of tech start-ups and other companies, including Lombardi Software in Austin, Texas, where he was Chief Technology Officer and later president. In 2010, Lombardi was acquired by IBM, which kept him on board in a leadership capacity, asking him to drive the design-led transformation in 2012.

When Virginia M. Rometty became chief executive in January 2012, she told her executive team that she wanted “to rethink and reimagine” the experience of IBM’s customers. She asked Gilbert “what would it take to get our massive company to move more quickly and invent things in new ways? And fast?” Gilbert opted to put “Design thinking at the center” of the cultural transformation of the company.

=== Design Thinking ===
According to Gilbert, design thinking reverses IBM’s traditional technology product development to focus more on user experience. Although not trained as a designer, Gilbert “got religion” on how it could help scale businesses in the 1980s, and “Ever since then I’ve been pursuing this notion that the magic in any product or service is how it's experienced by the end user,” he said. To facilitate this, Gilbert organized the Design Program Office (DPO) in 2013 and hired IBM’s first cohort of 60 designers. IBM set up a design facility in Gilbert’s home of Austin, where among other things they started holding design “boot camps” for new hires and multidisciplinary product teams. which would become the subject of a documentary film of the same name in 2017.

By the time of his retirement in 2021, the design group had expanded to 5,000 and become integrated into the company’s business across 180 countries, playing a role in performance evaluation, HR, finance organization, data, and other services. To improve the user experience, Gilbert integrated designers into “all of the really gorpy details of integrating a product.”

=== Retirement from IBM ===
Gilbert retired from IBM in 2021 after serving as its General Manager of Design. In July 2021, IBM appointed Katrina Alcorn as his successor.

=== Post-IBM career ===
After retiring from IBM in 2021, Gilbert continued to work as an author, speaker, executive adviser, and board member. In 2025, John Wiley & Sons published Irresistible Change: A Blueprint for Earning Buy-In and Breakout Success, Gilbert's account of his experience leading IBM's design and organizational transformation. The book examines the adoption of organizational change and argues for treating change as a product that employees can choose to adopt rather than as a mandate imposed from above. The transformation described in the book involved IBM's global workforce of approximately 400,000 employees.

The publication received coverage in Design Observer Fast Company and Fortune,

Gilbert has also written and spoken about organizational transformation, leadership, artificial intelligence, workplace design, and corporate culture. In 2025, he appeared on Bloomberg Television's The Close to discuss workplace strategy and his book, including his support for offices designed to encourage collaboration and improve the experience of working in person.

In 2026, Gilbert was appointed to the Board of Trustees of the Eames Institute for Infinite Curiosity. He was also included in the institute's 2026 Curious 100, which recognizes individuals whose work reflects curiosity and creative approaches to problem-solving. Alice Waters was among the other individuals included in the 2026 list.

In January 2026, the Dave Alexander Center for Social Capital named Gilbert one of its "Top 66 People-Centric Leaders of 2025." The organization cited his work on organizational change and his approach to employee adoption of new ways of working.

== Personal life ==
Gilbert lives in Austin, Texas.

== Awards and honors ==
At IBM, Gilbert served as co-chair of the global Women’s Executive Council, and established the company’s Racial Equity in Design team, having written in The New York Times that leaders need to "Hear every voice in the room." He has lectured at the National Defense University in Washington, DC, on leadership and design.

In 2018, Gilbert was inducted into the New York Foundation for the Arts Hall of Fame for his role in establishing a modern standard for the role of the arts in business. In 2019, Gov. Kevin Stitt named him an Oklahoma Creativity Ambassador for his achievements in the world of creative thinking and innovation.

== See also ==
- Change management
- Carbon Design System
- IBM Plex
- Eliot Noyes
- Ginni Rometty
- Charles and Ray Eames
