= Mick Lombardi =

American football coach (born 1988)

San Francisco 49ers
- Title: Quarterbacks coach

Personal information
- Born: October 1, 1988 (age 38); Ocean City, New Jersey, U.S.

Career information
- High school: Saint Mary's College High School
- College: Fordham

Career history

Coaching
- Fordham (2009–2010) Coaching assistant; San Francisco 49ers (2013–2016); Assistant to the head coach (2013); Offensive assistant (2014); Defensive assistant (2015); Offensive quality control coach (2016); New York Jets (2017–2018) Offensive assistant; New England Patriots (2019–2021); Assistant quarterbacks coach (2019); Wide receivers coach (2020–2021); Las Vegas Raiders (2022–2023) Offensive coordinator; San Francisco 49ers (2024–present); Senior offensive assistant (2024); Quarterbacks coach (2025–present)

Operations
- New England Patriots (2011–2012) Scouting assistant
- Coaching profile at Pro Football Reference

Mick Lombardi (born October 1, 1988) is an American professional football coach who is the quarterbacks coach for the San Francisco 49ers of the National Football League (NFL). He previously served as an assistant coach for the New England Patriots, New York Jets, San Francisco 49ers and Las Vegas Raiders.

== Coaching career ==
=== Fordham ===
Lombardi began his coaching career at his alma mater, working as a coaching assistant for the Fordham Rams.

=== New England Patriots ===
In 2011, Lombardi began his NFL career with the New England Patriots as a scouting assistant. He was part of the Patriots roster that made it to Super Bowl XLVI in 2011.

=== San Francisco 49ers ===
In 2013, Lombardi was hired by the San Francisco 49ers as their assistant to the head coach under head coach Jim Harbaugh. In 2014, Lombardi was named as an offensive assistant. In 2015, he was retained under head coach Jim Tomsula as a defensive assistant. In 2016, Lombardi was retained under head coach Chip Kelly as an offensive quality control coach.

=== New York Jets ===
In 2017, Lombardi was hired by the New York Jets as an offensive assistant. In 2018, he was promoted to assistant quarterbacks coach.

=== New England Patriots (second stint) ===
In 2019, Lombardi was re-hired by the New England Patriots as their assistant quarterbacks coach. In 2020, Lombardi was promoted to wide receivers coach.

=== Las Vegas Raiders ===
On February 25, 2022, Lombardi was hired by the Las Vegas Raiders as their offensive coordinator under head coach Josh McDaniels.

On October 31, 2023, Lombardi was fired by the Raiders, alongside head coach Josh McDaniels and general manager Dave Ziegler.

=== San Francisco 49ers (second stint) ===
On March 8, 2024, Lombardi was hired by the San Francisco 49ers to a yet to be known position. On March 25, head coach Kyle Shanahan announced that Lombardi would serve in the offensive pass game specialist role and senior offensive assistant role, replacing Klint Kubiak who left to become the offensive coordinator of the New Orleans Saints. On February 25, 2025, he was named the new Quarterbacks coach replacing Brian Griese.

== Personal life ==
Lombardi and his wife, Michelle, have two sons and one daughter.

He is the son of former NFL executive Michael Lombardi, who last served as the general manager of the Cleveland Browns from 2013 to 2014.
