= Lombardo =

Lombardo is an Italian demonym ("from Lombardy") and surname, most commonly found in Sicily where it is the third most common family name. Notable people with the name include:

== Surname ==
- Andrea Lombardo (born 1987), Canadian football (soccer) player
- Ángel Lombardo (born 1983), Panamanian retired footballer
- Antonio Lombardo (sculptor) (1458–1516), sculptor, son of Pietro Lombardo
- Antonio Lombardo (gangster) (1892–1928), Italian-American advisor to Al Capone
- Apolonio Lombardo (1934–2020), Panamanian footballer
- Atilio Lombardo (1902-1984), Uruguayan botanist
- Attilio Lombardo (born 1966), Italian football (soccer) player
- Carmen Lombardo (1903–1971), Canadian musician, brother of Guy Lombardo
- Dave Lombardo (born 1965), Cuban-American drummer
- Francisco Lombardo (1925–2012), Argentine footballer
- Giovanni Lombardo Radice (1954–2023), Italian actor
- Guy Lombardo (1902–1977), Canadian-American bandleader and musician
- Isabella Lombardo, Australian child with spastic quadriplegic cerebral palsy
- Ivan Matteo Lombardo (1902–1980), Italian politician
- Joe Lombardo (born 1962), former Sheriff of Clark County and Governor of Nevada since 2023
- John Lombardo (born 1952), American musician (alternative rock band 10,000 Maniacs, folk duo John & Mary)
- Joseph Lombardo (1929–2019), American Mafia figure
- Juan Lombardo (1927–2019), Argentine admiral, planned Operation Rosario
- Lucio Lombardo-Radice (1916–1982), Italian mathematician
- Manuel Lombardo (born 1998), Italian judoka
- Marino Lombardo (1950–2021), Italian professional football player and coach
- Massimo Lombardo (born 1973), Swiss footballer
- Matteo Lombardo (born 1985) Italian footballer
- Mauro Ezequiel Lombardo (born 1996), Argentine rapper better known as Duki
- Michelle Lombardo (born 1983), American model and actress
- Mike Lombardo (born 1988), American former musician and convicted sex offender
- Philip Lombardo (1908–1987), American mobster
- Pietro Lombardo (1435–1515), Italian sculptor
- Raffaele Lombardo (born 1950), Italian politician
- Rick Lombardo (born 1959), American theatre director
- Robert Lombardo (composer) (1932–2026), American composer and composition teacher
- Robert J. Lombardo (born 1957), American Catholic bishop
- Rosalia Lombardo (1918–1920), Italian girl and one of the last people placed in the catacombs of Palermo
- Rossana Lombardo (born 1962), Italian sprinter
- Stanley Lombardo (born 1943), American academic and translator
- Tony Lombardo (born 1945), American punk musician
- Tullio Lombardo (1460–1532), Italian sculptor, son of Pietro Lombardo
- Vicente Lombardo Toledano (1894–1968), Mexican labor leader

== Given name ==
- Lombardo Boyar (born 1973), American actor

== See also ==
- Lombardo (family)
- Lombardi (disambiguation)
- Lombardia
- Lombard (disambiguation)
- Lombardozzi
