= 1975 South African Grand Prix =

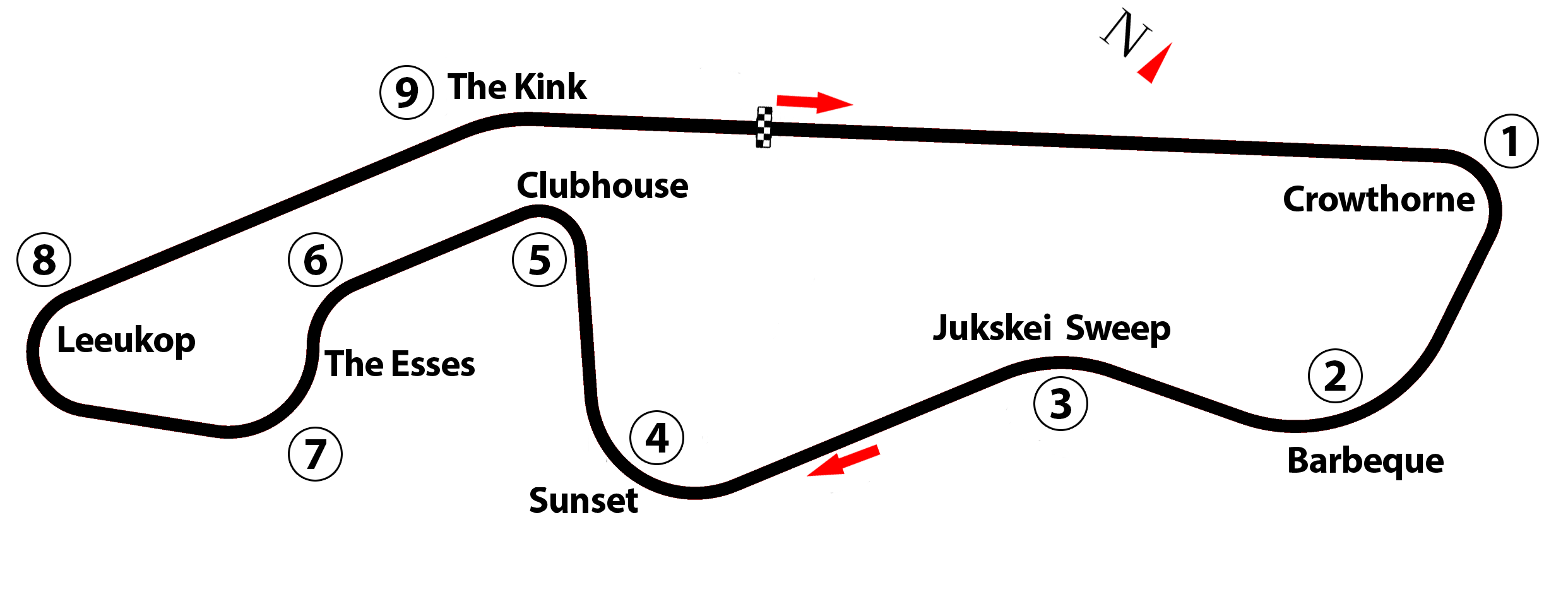

Race details
- Date: 1 March 1975
- Official name: XXI Lucky Strike Grand Prix of South Africa
- Location: Kyalami; Transvaal Province, South Africa
- Course: Permanent racing facility
- Course length: 4.104 km (2.550 miles)
- Distance: 78 laps, 320.112 km (198.908 miles)
- Weather: Sunny

Pole position
Driver	(Brazil) Carlos Pace	Brabham-Ford
- Time: 1:16.41

Fastest lap
Driver	(Brazil) Carlos Pace	Brabham-Ford
- Time: 1:17.20 on lap 11

Podium
First	(South Africa) Jody Scheckter	Tyrrell-Ford
Second	(Argentina) Carlos Reutemann	Brabham-Ford
Third	(France) Patrick Depailler	Tyrrell-Ford

The 1975 South African Grand Prix (formally the XXI Lucky Strike Grand Prix of South Africa) was a Formula One motor race held at Kyalami on 1 March 1975. It was race 3 of 14 in both the 1975 World Championship of Drivers and the 1975 International Cup for Formula One Manufacturers. It was the 21st South African Grand Prix since the first Grand Prix was held in 1934 and the ninth to be held at Kyalami just outside Johannesburg. It was held over 78 laps of the four kilometre circuit for a race distance of 320 kilometres.

Jody Scheckter became the first South African driver to win the race. Driving a Tyrrell 007, he took over the lead of the race from Carlos Pace on lap three and took a three-second win over the Brabham BT44B of Carlos Reutemann. Scheckter's Tyrrell teammate Patrick Depailler finished third.

== Race summary ==
Ferrari had used the free month of February profitably, producing the new 312T model with a new transverse gearbox. There was also a new face in the persona of female Italian racer Lella Lombardi (the first woman to take part in a World Championship race since Maria Teresa de Filippis in the 1958 Italian Grand Prix).

In practice, Graham Hill's car spun on oil dropped from Ronnie Peterson's car and crashed, destroying his car. He opted to sit out the race. Once the debris had been cleared and holes in the catch fencing mended, there was a second accident as Niki Lauda spun on engine oil, hitting the wall at 120 mph. With further violent accidents to Jody Scheckter and Guy Tunmer, the drivers deemed the circuit not safe and refused to continue until fencing defects were remedied and the track improved, further helped by the support of mechanics who insisted no more practice be carried out.

When the racing got under way, Carlos Pace led from pole in a Brabham 1–2 but was soon passed by Jody Scheckter and Carlos Reutemann after experiencing braking problems, and Patrick Depailler soon climbed to third. James Hunt retired with a broken throttle linkage, Vittorio Brambilla with oil cooler problems and Ian Scheckter crashed. Emerson Fittipaldi was challenging Depailler for 4th place when he suffered a cracked plug lead. Jody Scheckter held on from Reutemann for his only home win.

== Classification ==
=== Qualifying ===
Pos.	Driver	Constructor	Time/Gap
1	(Brazil) Carlos Pace	Brabham–Ford	1:16.41
2	(Argentina) Carlos Reutemann	Brabham–Ford	+0.07
3	(South Africa) Jody Scheckter	Tyrrell–Ford	+0.23
4	(Austria) Niki Lauda	Ferrari	+0.42
5	(France) Patrick Depailler	Tyrrell–Ford	+0.42
6	(United States) Mario Andretti	Parnelli–Ford	+0.48
7	(Italy) Vittorio Brambilla	March–Ford	+0.64
8	(Sweden) Ronnie Peterson	Lotus–Ford	+0.73
9	(Switzerland) Clay Regazzoni	Ferrari	+0.75
10	(United Kingdom) John Watson	Surtees–Ford	+0.76
11	(Brazil) Emerson Fittipaldi	McLaren–Ford	+0.81
12	(United Kingdom) James Hunt	Hesketh–Ford	+0.89
13	(France) Jean-Pierre Jarier	Shadow–Ford	+0.91
14	(West Germany) Rolf Stommelen	Lola–Ford	+1.06
15	(Italy) Arturo Merzario	Williams–Ford	+1.12
16	(West Germany) Jochen Mass	McLaren–Ford	+1.38
17	(South Africa) Ian Scheckter	Tyrrell–Ford	+1.59
18	(United States) Mark Donohue	Penske–Ford	+1.87
19	(United Kingdom) Tom Pryce	Shadow–Ford	+1.95
20	(South Africa) David Charlton	McLaren–Ford	+2.10
21	(Belgium) Jacky Ickx	Lotus–Ford	+2.27
22	(South Africa) Eddie Keizan	Lotus–Ford	+2.60
23	(France) Jacques Laffite	Williams–Ford	+2.74
24	(United Kingdom) Bob Evans	BRM	+2.76
25	(South Africa) Guy Tunmer	Lotus–Ford	+3.11
26	(Italy) Lella Lombardi	March–Ford	+3.27
27	(Brazil) Wilson Fittipaldi	Fittipaldi–Ford	+3.32
28	(United Kingdom) Graham Hill	Lola–Ford	+5.04

*Positions in red indicate entries that failed to qualify.

=== Race ===
Pos	No	Driver	Constructor	Laps	Time/Retired	Grid	Points
1	3	(South Africa) Jody Scheckter	Tyrrell-Ford	78	1:43:16.90	3	9
2	7	(Argentina) Carlos Reutemann	Brabham-Ford	78	+ 3.74	2	6
3	4	(France) Patrick Depailler	Tyrrell-Ford	78	+ 16.92	5	4
4	8	(Brazil) Carlos Pace	Brabham-Ford	78	+ 17.31	1	3
5	12	(Austria) Niki Lauda	Ferrari	78	+ 28.64	4	2
6	2	(Germany) Jochen Mass	McLaren-Ford	78	+ 1:03.64	16	1
7	23	(Germany) Rolf Stommelen	Lola-Ford	78	+ 1:12.91	14	
8	28	(United States) Mark Donohue	Penske-Ford	77	+ 1 Lap	18	
9	16	(United Kingdom) Tom Pryce	Shadow-Ford	77	+ 1 Lap	19	
10	5	(Sweden) Ronnie Peterson	Lotus-Ford	77	+ 1 Lap	8	
11	34	(South Africa) Guy Tunmer	Lotus-Ford	76	+ 2 Laps	25	
12	6	(Belgium) Jacky Ickx	Lotus-Ford	76	+ 2 Laps	21	
13	33	(South Africa) Eddie Keizan	Lotus-Ford	76	+ 2 Laps	22	
14	31	(South Africa) Dave Charlton	McLaren-Ford	76	+ 2 Laps	20	
15	14	(United Kingdom) Bob Evans	BRM	76	+ 2 Laps	24	
16	11	(Switzerland) Clay Regazzoni	Ferrari	71	Throttle	9	
17	27	(United States) Mario Andretti	Parnelli-Ford	70	Transmission	6	
NC	21	(France) Jacques Laffite	Williams-Ford	69	+ 9 Laps	23	
NC	1	(Brazil) Emerson Fittipaldi	McLaren-Ford	65	+ 13 Laps	11	
Ret	32	(South Africa) Ian Scheckter	Tyrrell-Ford	55	Accident	17	
Ret	24	(United Kingdom) James Hunt	Hesketh-Ford	53	Fuel system	12	
Ret	17	(France) Jean-Pierre Jarier	Shadow-Ford	37	Overheating	13	
Ret	10	(Italy) Lella Lombardi	March-Ford	23	Fuel system	26	
Ret	20	(Italy) Arturo Merzario	Williams-Ford	22	Engine	15	
Ret	18	(United Kingdom) John Watson	Surtees-Ford	19	Clutch	10	
Ret	9	(Italy) Vittorio Brambilla	March-Ford	16	Radiator	7	
DNQ	30	(Brazil) Wilson Fittipaldi	Fittipaldi-Ford				
DNQ	22	(United Kingdom) Graham Hill	Lola-Ford				

== Notes ==
- This was the Formula One World Championship debut for British driver Bob Evans and South African driver Guy Tunmer.
- This race saw the 10th fastest lap set by a Brazilian driver.
- This was the 10th podium finish for a South African driver.

== Championship standings after the race ==
Drivers' Championship standings

	Pos	Driver	Points
	1	(Brazil) Emerson Fittipaldi	15
	2	(Brazil) Carlos Pace	12
2	3	(Argentina) Carlos Reutemann	10
9	4	(South Africa) Jody Scheckter	9
2	5	(United Kingdom) James Hunt	7

Constructors' Championship standings

	Pos	Constructor	Points
1	1	(United Kingdom) Brabham-Ford	19
1	2	(United Kingdom) McLaren-Ford	16
2	3	(United Kingdom) Tyrrell-Ford	11
	4	(Italy) Ferrari	8
2	5	(United Kingdom) Hesketh-Ford	7

- Note: Only the top five positions are included for both sets of standings.

Previous race: 1975 Brazilian Grand Prix	FIA Formula One World Championship; 1975 season	Next race: 1975 Spanish Grand Prix
Previous race: 1974 South African Grand Prix	South African Grand Prix	Next race: 1976 South African Grand Prix
