= Nielsen (surname) =

Nielsen (Danish pronunciation: [ˈne̝lsn̩]) is a Danish patronymic surname, literally meaning son of Niels, Niels being the Danish version of the Greek male given name Νικόλαος, Nikolaos (cf. Nicholas). It is the most common surname in Denmark, shared by about 4% of the population, and is also in use in the Faroe Islands. It is also used in Norway, although the forms Nelsen and Nilsen are more common. In Sweden the parallel form is Nilsson. The frequent occurrence of Nielsen as a surname outside Denmark is due to emigration. Immigrants to English-speaking countries sometimes changed the spelling to Neilsen, Neilson, Nelsen, Nelson, or Nielson.

Notable people with this name include:

- Alice Nielsen (1872–1943), American singer
- Allan Nielsen (born 1971), Danish footballer
- Allan Nielsen (footballer, born 1976), Danish footballer
- Amaldus Nielsen (1838–1932), Norwegian painter
- Ana María Nielsen (born 1951), Argentine runner
- Anders Christian Nielsen, also known as A. C. Nielsen, (1848–1929), Danish community founder, Junction City, Oregon
- Anders Peter Nielsen (1867–1950), Danish shooter
- Arthur Nielsen (1897–1980), American market analyst
- Asta Nielsen (1881–1972), Danish actress
- August Nielsen (1877–1956), Norwegian architect
- Axel Nielsen (chess player) (1914–2004), Danish chess master
- Benny Nielsen (disambiguation), multiple people
- Birthe Nielsen (1926–2010), Danish sprinter
- Brigitte Nielsen (born 1963), Danish actress
- Carl Nielsen (1865–1931), Danish composer
- Christopher Nielsen (born 1963), Norwegian comics artist
- Claus Nielsen (born 1964), Danish former footballer
- Claus Børge Nielsen (born 1961), Danish boxer
- Connie Nielsen (born 1965), Danish actress
- Dane Nielsen, Australian rugby league footballer
- David Nielsen (born 1976), Danish footballer
- Ebbe Nielsen (1950–2001), Danish entomologist
- Eigil Nielsen (disambiguation), multiple people
- Emil Nielsen (born 1993), Danish footballer
- Emil Nielsen (born 1997), Danish handballer
- Erik Charles Nielsen (born 1981), American actor and comedian
- Erik Nielsen (1924–2008), former Deputy Prime Minister of Canada, brother of Leslie
- E. Verner Nielsen (1899–1981), Danish chess master
- Fía Selma Nielsen (born 1986), Faroese politician
- Frans Nielsen (born 1984), Danish Ice Hockey player
- Frederik Nielsen (born 1983), Danish tennis player
- Frida Sanggaard Nielsen (born 1998), Danish rower
- Grethe Lovsø Nielsen (1926–2017), Danish sprinter
- Gunnar Nielsen (athlete) (1928–1985), Danish athlete, former world record-holder over 1500 metres
- Gunnar Nielsen (footballer born 1986), Faroese football player
- Gunnar Guillermo Nielsen, Argentine football player
- Hans Nielsen (disambiguation), multiple people
- Harald Nielsen (1941–2015) former Danish footballer
- Hartvig Nielsen (1908–unknown), Danish chess player
- Håvard Nielsen (born 1993), Norwegian footballer
- Henry Nielsen (disambiguation), multiple people
- Holger Nielsen (1866–1955), Danish Olympic competitor in various sports
- Holger Bech Nielsen (born 1941), Danish theoretical physicist
- Holger K. Nielsen (born 1950), Danish politician
- Holger Marius Nielsen (1905–1993), Official of the Danish Ministry of Education
- Inga Nielsen (1946–2008), Danish soprano
- Jacob Stolt-Nielsen Jr. (1931–2015), Norwegian entrepreneur
- Jakob Nielsen (disambiguation), multiple people
- Jennifer A. Nielsen (born 1971), American author
- Jens-Frederik Nielsen (born 1991), current Prime Minister of Greenland
- Jens Rud Nielsen (1894–1979), Danish-American physicist
- Jeppe Nielsen (born 1974), Danish freestyle swimmer
- Jerri Nielsen (1952–2009), American physician
- Jimmy Nielsen (born 1977), Danish footballer
- Joachim Nielsen (1964–2000; better known as Jokke), Norwegian rock musician and poet
- John Nielsen (disambiguation), multiple people
- Jonatan Nielsen (born 1993), Swedish professional ice hockey
- Juanita Nielsen (1937–1975), Australian publisher
- Julius Nielsen (1901–1981), Danish chess master
- Kay Nielsen (1886–1957), Danish "golden age" illustrator
- Kai Nielsen (disambiguation), multiple people
- Kai Peter Anthon Nielsen (1906–1988), better known as Kai Ewans, a Danish jazz musician
- Kirstjen Nielsen (born 1972), American government official, former White House Deputy Chief of Staff, and United States Secretary of Homeland Security
- Kurt Nielsen (1930–2011), Danish former tennis player
- Lasse Nielsen (disambiguation), multiple people
- Laviai Nielsen (born 1996), British athlete
- Leslie Nielsen (1926–2010), Canadian-born American film actor
- Lina Nielsen (born 1996), British athlete
- Lone Drøscher Nielsen (born 1964), Danish wildlife conservationist
- Ludolf Nielsen (1876–1939), Danish composer, violinist, conductor and pianist
- Maria Nielsen (1882–1931), Danish historian and gymnasium headmistress
- Margaret Nielsen (1933–2023), New Zealand pianist and music teacher
- Marichen Nielsen (1921–2014), Danish politician
- Matthew Nielsen (born 1978), former Australian basketball player
- Michael Nielsen (born 1974), Australian-American quantum physicist and science writer
- Monica Nielsen, multiple people
- Nicolai Niels Nielsen (1777–1854), Norwegian priest and politician
- Niels Nielsen (disambiguation), multiple people
- Niels G. Stolt-Nielsen (born 1965), Norwegian business leader
- Nielsine Nielsen (1850–1916), the first female academic and physician in Denmark
- Norm Nielsen (1934–2020), American magician and businessman
- Olivia Nielsen (1852–1910), Danish trade unionist and politician
- Otto Nielsen (1909–1982), Norwegian songwriter, revue writer, cabaret singer and radio personality
- Palle Nielsen (chess player) (1929–1987), Danish chess master
- Preben Nielsen, Danish wheelchair curler
- Renata Nielsen (born 1966), Danish long jumper
- Richard Nielsen (disambiguation), multiple people
- Rick Nielsen, lead guitarist of the American rock band Cheap Trick
- Roy Nielsen (1916–1945), Norwegian resistance member during World War II
- Sanna Nielsen (born 1984), Swedish-born singer
- Signe Nielsen, American landscape architect
- Signe Torborg Schmidt-Nielsen (1878–1959), Swedish-Norwegian physicist and nutritionist
- Skylar Nielsen (born 1975), American film director
- Stephanie Risdal Nielsen (born 1991), Danish curler
- Terese Nielsen (born 1966), American fantasy artist and illustrator.
- Todd Nielsen, American politician
- Tom Nielsen, Danish curler
- Tove Nielsen (born 1941), Danish politician
- Valdemar Nielsen (1879–1954), Danish Olympic cyclist
- Villads Nielsen (born 2005), Danish footballer
- Walter M. Nielsen (1900–1981), American physicist
- Wilhelm Nielsen (politician) (1816–1889), Norwegian politician
- Yngvar Nielsen (1843–1916), Norwegian historian

== See also ==
- Neilsen (disambiguation)
- Neilson (name)
