= Neilson (name) =

Origin
- Meaning: Son of Neil

Other names
- Variant forms: MacNeil, Nelson, , Nielsen

Neilson
- Gender: Male

Neilson is a patronymic surname meaning "son of Neil". The prefix Neil- is of Irish Gaelic origin, a genitive of 'Niall', possibly meaning "Champion" or "Cloud". Neilson, as a surname, is common in English language-speaking countries, but less common as a given name. It can be an anglicisation of MacNeil (Gaelic: MacNeill) or the Scandinavian name, Nielsen.

People with the name Neilson or its variant spellings include:

== Surname ==
- Adelaide Neilson (1847–1880), British actress
- Alan Neilson (born 1972), German footballer
- Alex Neilson (born 1982), British musician
- Annabelle Neilson (1969–2018), English socialite
- Anthony Neilson (born 1967), British playwright
- Bill Neilson (1925–1989), Australian politician
- Brendan Neilson (born 1978), New Zealand-Japanese rugby union player
- Charles Neilson (1889–1916), Scottish footballer and teacher
- Cook Neilson (born 1943), U.S. journalist and motorcycle racer
- David Neilson (born 1949), British actor
- Donald Neilson (1936–2011), British criminal
- Ed Neilson, American politician
- Francis Neilson (1867–1961), British playwright and politician
- Harry B. Neilson (1861–1941), British illustrator
- Herman Neilson (1907–1978), American college sports coach and educator
- Ian Neilson (born 1954), South African engineer and politician
- Jackie Neilson (1929–2012), British footballer
- James Beaumont Neilson (1792–1865), British inventor
- James Neilson (director) (1909–1979), American film and television director
- Jim Neilson (1941–2020), Canadian ice hockey player
- John Neilson (1776–1848), Canadian politician
- Julia Neilson (1868–1957), British actress
- Kim Nielsen (born 1973), U.S. professional wrestler
- Lois Neilson (1895–1990), U.S. silent movie actress
- Marjory Newbold née Neilson (1883–1926), leading Scottish socialist and communist, prominent in the Independent Labour Party and a 'Red Clydesider'
- Melany Neilson (born 1958), U.S. novelist
- Nellie Neilson (1873-1947), American historian
- Perlita Neilson (1933–2014), English actress
- Phyllis Neilson-Terry (1892–1977), British actress
- Robbie Neilson (born 1980), British professional football player
- Roger Neilson (1934–2003), Canadian hockey coach
- Samuel Neilson (1761–1803), Irish political activist
- Sandra Neilson (born 1956), U.S. swimmer
- Scott Neilson (athlete) (born 1957), Canadian hammer thrower
- Scott Neilson (footballer) (born 1987), English footballer
- Shane Neilson (born 1975), Canadian physician, author and poet
- Shaw Neilson (1872–1942), Australian poet
- Susan Bieke Neilson (1956–2006), U.S. judge
- Tommy Neilson (1934–2018), British footballer
- Walter Montgomerie Neilson (1819–1889), Locomotive builder
- Willie Neilson (1873–1960), British Rugby player
- William Neilson (1844–1915), Canadian businessman
- William Allan Neilson (1869–1946), British-born U.S. educator, writer and lexicographer

== Given name ==
- Neilson Hubbard (born 1972), American singer-songwriter, musician and producer
- Neilson Powless (born 1996), American road racing cyclist

== See also ==
- Neilsen (disambiguation)
- Nelson (disambiguation)
- Nielsen (surname)
- Nielson
- Nilsen
- Category:Neilson family
- Nelson (surname)
