= Formula One drivers from Denmark =

List of Formula One drivers who competed as Danish

- Drivers: 5
- Grands Prix: 223
- Entries: 223
- Starts: 216
- Best season finish: 9th (2018)
- Wins: 0
- Podiums: 1
- Pole positions: 1
- Fastest laps: 3
- Points: 203
- First entry: 1973 Swedish Grand Prix
- Latest entry: 2024 Abu Dhabi Grand Prix
- 2026 drivers: None

There have been 5 Formula One drivers from Denmark.

== Former drivers ==
Tom Belsø became the first Danish Formula One driver when he was entered in the 1973 Swedish Grand Prix, however only participated in practice before handing the car over to Howden Ganley. His race debut came at the 1974 South African Grand Prix, where he ended up retiring on the first lap with clutch issues. He entered 3 further races, all in the 1974 season, with the only other start and sole finish coming in Sweden with 8th place.

Two years later, Jac Nellemann made an attempt to qualify a customer Brabham for the 1976 Swedish Grand Prix. His failure to qualify ensured he was the only car entered not to start the race. He also entered the 1977 Swedish Grand Prix but was not present.

Jan Magnussen, the father of Kevin Magnussen, made his debut in the 1995 Pacific Grand Prix as a replacement for the ill Mika Häkkinen, finishing 10th. Having raced in CART in 1996, he was picked up by Jackie Stewart's eponymous team for the 1997 season alongside Rubens Barrichello. He competed in 24 Grands Prix for the team, with his only point coming in his final race in Formula One, the 1998 Canadian Grand Prix. Since his retirement from Formula One, Magnussen has continued racing in other classes.

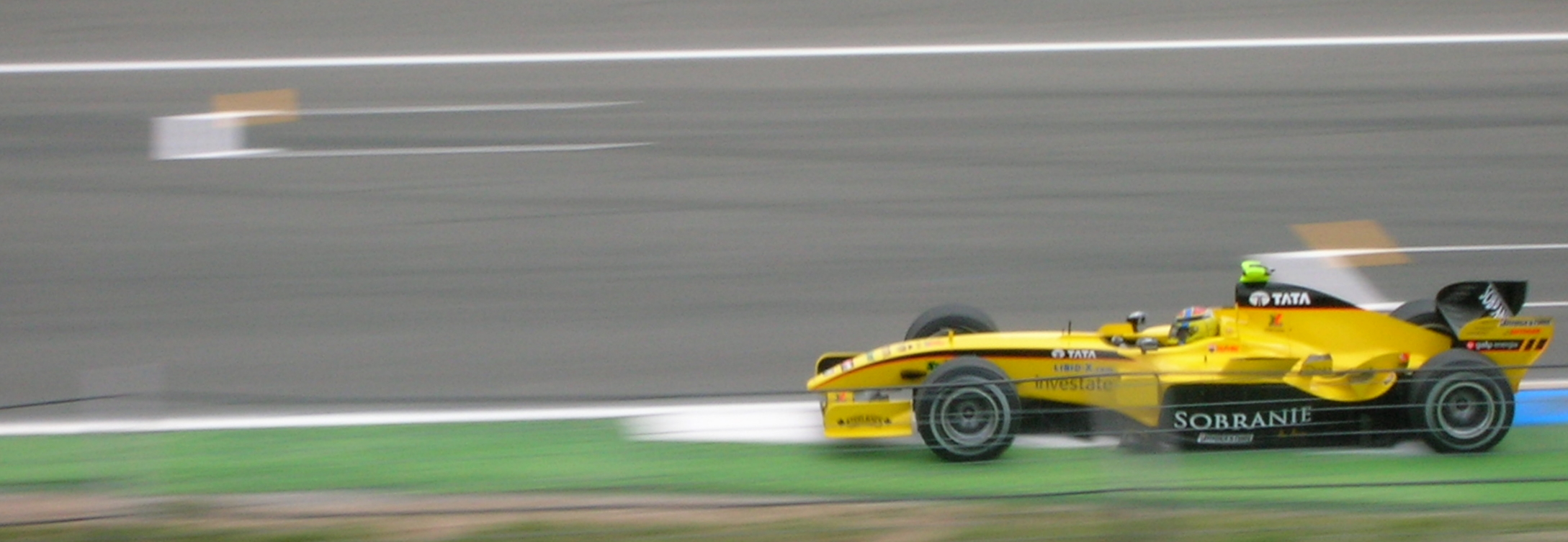
Kiesa driving for Jordan EJ15 at the 2005 German Grand Prix

Nicolas Kiesa made his debut at the 2003 German Grand Prix in a Minardi, following Justin Wilson's move to Jaguar. He competed in the final 5 races of the 2003 season, finishing all 5 but failing to score any points. He was replaced by Zsolt Baumgartner for 2004.

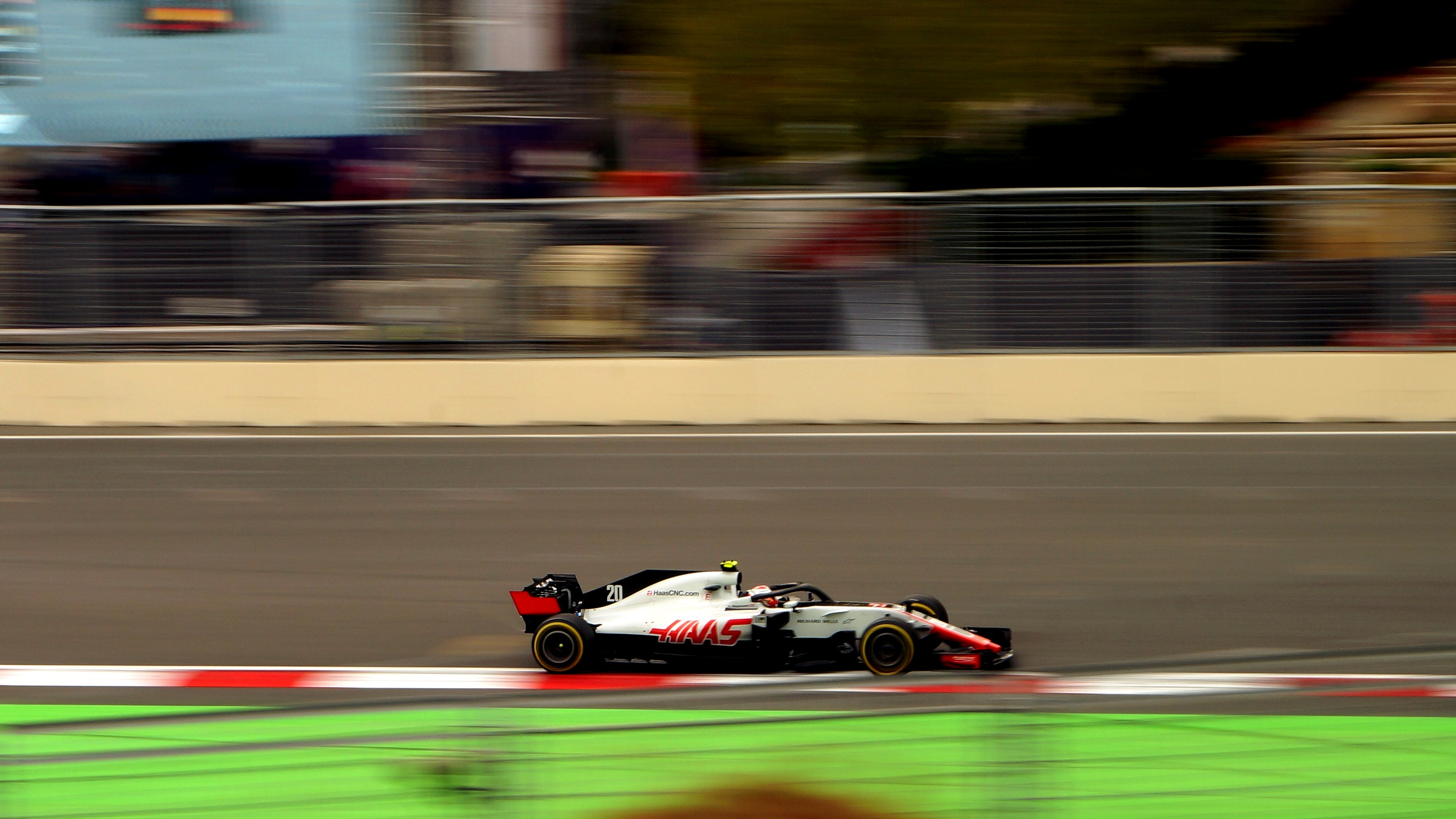
Kevin Magnussen driving for Haas at the 2018 Azerbaijan Grand Prix

Kevin Magnussen became the first 2nd-generation Danish driver in Formula One when he debuted in the 2014 Australian Grand Prix for McLaren. The son of Jan hit the ground running with the highest-placed grid since 2007 and the highest finishing positions for a debutante since 1996, starting fourth and finishing second – following the disqualification of Daniel Ricciardo. Magnussen however failed to continue this run of form and despite consistent points finishes throughout 2014 he found himself on the sidelines after McLaren announced their 2015 driver-line up of Jenson Button and Fernando Alonso. Despite this, Magnussen would be required to fill in for Alonso at the opening race of 2015, the Australian Grand Prix, following the Spaniard's crash in testing – however he did not take the start as his engine failed on his way to the starting grid.

For 2016 Magnussen returned to a full-time drive with Renault alongside debutant Jolyon Palmer, where he finished in the points only twice, culminating in a move to Haas for 2017 where he stayed until the conclusion of the 2020 season, after which he moved to sportscar racing. Magnussen rejoined Haas on a multi-year deal for the 2022 season. At the 2022 São Paulo Grand Prix, Magnussen became the first Danish polesitter. Magnussen had left the team at the end of the 2024 season.

== Statistics ==
| Drivers | Active Years | Entries | Wins | Podiums | Career Points | Poles | Fastest Laps |
|---|---|---|---|---|---|---|---|
| Tom Belsø | 1973–1974 | 5 (2 starts) | 0 | 0 | 0 | 0 | 0 |
| Jac Nellemann | 1976 | 1 (0 starts) | 0 | 0 | 0 | 0 | 0 |
| Jan Magnussen | 1995, 1997–1998 | 25 (24 starts) | 0 | 0 | 1 | 0 | 0 |
| Nicolas Kiesa | 2003 | 5 | 0 | 0 | 0 | 0 | 0 |
| Kevin Magnussen | 2014–2020, 2022–2024 | 187 (185 starts) | 0 | 1 | 202 | 1 | 3 |
