= Williams FW =

Formula One motor racing car

Iso–Marlboro IR Iso–Marlboro FW Williams FW
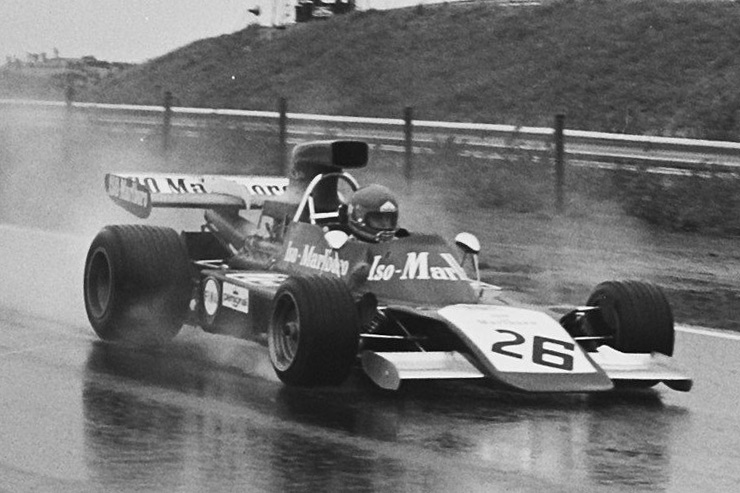
- Gijs van Lennep in the Iso–Marlboro IR at the 1973 Dutch Grand Prix
- Category: Formula One
- Constructor: Iso–Marlboro/Williams
- Designer: John Clarke
- Predecessor: Iso–Marlboro FX3B
- Successor: Williams FW04

Technical specifications
- Chassis: Aluminium monocoque, with engine as a fully stressed member.
- Engine: Ford Cosworth DFV 2,993 cc (182.6 cu in) 90° V8, naturally aspirated, mid-mounted.
- Transmission: Hewland FG 400 5-speed Manual.
- Weight: 576 kg (1,269.9 lb)
- Fuel: FINA
- Lubricants: FINA
- Tyres: Firestone (1973–1974); Goodyear (1975)

Competition history
- Notable entrants: Frank Williams Racing Cars
- Notable drivers: (Italy) Arturo Merzario (New Zealand) Howden Ganley (France) Jacques Laffite (Netherlands) Gijs van Lennep
- Debut: 1973 Spanish Grand Prix
Races	Wins	Poles	F/Laps
39	0	0	0
- Unless otherwise stated, all data refer to Formula One World Championship Grands Prix only.

The Williams FW was a Formula One car used by Frank Williams Racing Cars during the 1973, 1974 and 1975 seasons. It was designed by John Clarke.

The car was initially designated in 1973 as the Iso–Marlboro IR and two examples started the season. One was destroyed in an accident at the 1973 German Grand Prix, and a replacement was built. When Marlboro and Italian sports car manufacturer Iso both withdrew their backing before the 1974 season, the two cars were renamed for 1974 as the Iso–Marlboro FW. Another example was completed during the 1974 season. These three surviving cars were renamed as Williams cars for 1975, and carried separate designations: FW01, FW02 and FW03, although the cars were of the same type.

== Development ==
As Williams's current chassis, the Iso–Marlboro FX3B, did not conform to 1973's new deformable structure regulations, a new car had to be designed. The result was the IR (the initials standing for Iso Rivolta, although the company had no part in the car's gestation), designed by ex March engineer John Clarke. Another conventional design, it followed the design thinking of the current trend of F1 cars of a low centre of gravity and wedge shape pioneered by the Lotus 72 and McLaren M23. It featured double wishbone front suspension with upper and lower links at the rear, and outboard springs all round. The fuel tanks were positioned on either side of the cockpit. The car's lines were angular except for the rounded cockpit. Italian engineer Giampaolo Dallara was brought into the team to redesign the rear suspension during the 1973 season. Ron Tauranac also made some development changes later in the season.

== Racing history ==
=== 1973 ===
The FX3B was used for the first three races of the 1973 season, and had been driven by New Zealander Howden Ganley and Italian Nanni Galli, although Jackie Pretorius had filled in at the South African Grand Prix when Galli was injured. The new IR appeared at the fourth race of the season, the Spanish Grand Prix, with Ganley and the returning Galli at the wheel. Qualifying on the last two rows of the grid, the Italian finished 11th while Ganley retired when he ran out of fuel. Both drivers retired in Belgium, through an engine failure for Galli and an accident for Ganley when his throttle stuck. Both drivers retired with half-shaft failures at the Monaco Grand Prix, although Ganley had qualified tenth fastest, and after the race Galli left the team and announced his retirement from Formula One.

Tom Belsø replaced Galli in Sweden but he only took part in practice (and was slowest) as it appeared no funding was available from his sponsors for the race. Ganley crashed in the warm-up and finished eleventh in the car Belsø had used. The car had received a new cooling system before this race. Henri Pescarolo returned to replace Belsø for the French Grand Prix, but retired with overheating problems while Ganley finished 14th. Graham McRae replaced Pescarolo for the British Grand Prix, qualifying on the back row, but he retired with a throttle problem on the first lap, while Ganley started 18th and finished ninth.

Williams continued to rent out the second IR to paydrivers, and Gijs van Lennep replaced McRae for the Dutch Grand Prix. In a race overshadowed by the death of Roger Williamson, van Lennep finished sixth, two laps down, with Ganley ninth. This race marked the first World Championship point scored by an Iso–Marlboro. Pescarolo returned for the German Grand Prix, qualifying 12th and finishing tenth, but Ganley crashed heavily in practice due to brake problems, writing off the chassis. A replacement was quickly built (and given the same chassis number "02"), and Van Lennep returned for the Austrian Grand Prix. The Dutchman put in another good performance finishing ninth, but Ganley was ten laps down and not classified. In Italy, Ganley was eleven laps down and was again not classified, and Van Lennep retired with overheating.

Another new driver, the Australian Tim Schenken, replaced van Lennep for the Canadian Grand Prix. The race began in very wet conditions, which caused a number of incidents later in the race, and for the first time in Formula One history a safety car was deployed, although the sport would wait until 1993 before giving an official role to these cars. The car in question was a Porsche 914 driven by former Formula One privateer Eppie Wietzes. Wietzes failed to pick up the leader, staying in front of Ganley by mistake, which allowed several drivers including eventual winner Peter Revson to gain a lap on the field. In the subsequent confusion, some believed the leader to be Ganley, and others including Team Lotus manager Colin Chapman were sure it was Emerson Fittipaldi. The race order was in chaos, but when the safety car withdrew, Ganley's IR was leading the race. "As they thought I was in front I decided perhaps I'd better try and stay there," said Ganley afterwards, and he led Fittipaldi and Jackie Stewart for eight laps. After both had passed him, Ganley continued to battle with Stewart, Mike Hailwood, Revson and James Hunt until the end of the race. Fittipaldi crossed the line but the chequered flag was not waved; instead it was waved at Revson, with Ganley sixth, earning his first and the team's second World Championship point of the season. Schenken finished 14th, five laps down. Lap charts differed, but some (including the team's chart, kept by Ganley's girlfriend) suggested that Ganley had won the race. "I believed I should have finished either first or third," he later said.

Jacky Ickx replaced Schenken for the season-ending United States Grand Prix and drove well to finish seventh with Ganley 12th. This was the final race for the car under the IR designation, and it had scored two points, leaving Williams tenth in the Constructors' Championship standings.

=== 1974 ===
After backers Iso and Marlboro left before the 1974 season, the slightly revised car was renamed the Iso–Marlboro FW, and Frank Williams found that he was underfinanced. At first therefore, a single car (chassis "02") was entered for former Ferrari driver Arturo Merzario, who had replaced Ganley as the team's number one driver. At the season-opening Argentine Grand Prix, the Italian qualified 13th but retired with overheating problems. In Brazil, Merzario qualified ninth but his engine failed before the start and he had to race in the spare car. He retired after 20 laps with a throttle problem.

At the South African Grand Prix, Williams entered a second car (chassis "01") for Tom Belsø, who qualified last with Merzario an outstanding third on the grid. The Dane retired on lap 1 with a slipping clutch but Merzario finished sixth, earning the team their first World Championship point of the season. A new third chassis ("03") was completed at this time, allowing for a spare car (usually "01"). In Spain Belsø was slowest in practice and failed to qualify and Merzario started seventh. He raced well and was lying fourth when he went off the track on lap 38; his car went over the barriers, landing among a group of photographers, fortunately with no injuries.

Gijs van Lennep returned for the Belgian Grand Prix, replacing Belsø, but the Dutchman qualified on the back row with Merzario seventh. Van Lennep finished 14th but Merzario retired with a broken driveshaft. The entry for the Monaco Grand Prix was cut back, and only Merzario raced, but he retired after a multiple accident at the start. Before the Swedish Grand Prix, Merzario had broken a finger in a sports car crash, and after a few practice laps, he decided against racing in Sweden. British driver Richard Robarts was scheduled to substitute for him alongside the returning Belsø, but the Dane damaged his car in practice and ultimately raced Robarts' car instead. Belsø qualified 21st and finished eighth, the best result of his career.

A disappointing mid-season period followed with a string of non-qualifications for the second FW as the "01" chassis had to be used again due to accidents. Van Lennep returned for the Dutch Grand Prix but failed to qualify and Merzario retired with a broken gearbox, having qualified down in 21st. For the French Grand Prix, Jean-Pierre Jabouille was brought in to replace the Dutchman but he also failed to qualify (the last appearance for chassis "01"), while Merzario started 15th and finished ninth. Belsø returned again for the British Grand Prix, although Jabouille also practiced, but the Dane failed to qualify. Merzario again started 15th but retired when his engine failed.

Subsequently, Frenchman Jacques Laffite took the second Williams seat for the remainder of the season. He qualified the car in 21st place for the German Grand Prix with Merzario 16th, although both retired early in the race; Laffite with suspension failure and Merzario with a throttle problem. In Austria, qualifying improved with Merzario ninth and Laffite 12th, but the Italian retired with a fuel system problem and Laffite was unclassified at the end, seventeen laps down.

The team's fortunes turned at the Italian Grand Prix. Although Merzario and Laffite started in the midfield, 15th and 17th respectively, and Laffite retired with an engine failure, Merzario finished fourth, scoring three World Championship points. This ultimately marked the car's best result under any of its three designations. In Canada their form dipped again with both cars qualifying in the lower midfield, and a double retirement. Merzario retired at half-distance with handling problems and the Frenchman was classified 15th after dropping out with a puncture. At the season-ending United States Grand Prix, Laffite outqualified Merzario for the first time (11th and 15th), but Laffite retired and Merzario followed him when his onboard fire extinguisher deployed and the engine cut out. This was the last race for the car as an Iso–Marlboro.

The Williams team had scored four World Championship points, earning them tenth place in the Constructors' Championship for the second season running.

=== 1975 ===
The three remaining FW chassis were renamed the Williams FW for 1975, and revised by Ray Stokoe, but by now the design was becoming outdated. They were resdesignated the FW01, FW02 and FW03 despite being of the same type. The oldest car, the FW01 (original IR chassis "01") continued to be used only as a spare car, and the FW02 (IR chassis "02") was only used for the first three races of the season. The team used the slightly newer FW03 throughout 1975 while they worked on a replacement, the FW04, which was ready for the Spanish Grand Prix. Williams was operating on a low budget and was occasionally even forced to buy used tyres from other teams. Both Merzario and Laffite stayed with the team for 1975.

Williams began the season with Laffite driving the FW02 and Merzario in the FW03. They qualified for the season-opening Argentine Grand Prix in 17th and 20th respectively, and Laffite retired from the race with a broken gearbox. Merzario finished eleven laps down and was not classified. In Brazil, Merzario started 11th but retired from the race with a fuel system problem, while Laffite started 19th and finished 11th. In the final World Championship race for the FW02, the South African Grand Prix, Laffite started 23rd and was unclassified at the end of the race, nine laps down. Merzario qualified the FW03 in 15th place but retired with engine failure.

Two non-championship races took place at this time; firstly the 1975 Race of Champions, in which Williams entered the FW02 for Maurizio Flammini, who crashed it in practice and did not start the race. Merzario drove the FW03 to seventh place. At the 1975 BRDC International Trophy, Merzario drove the FW03 but failed to start after engine problems.

At the Spanish Grand Prix, the young British driver Tony Brise replaced Laffite who was driving in Formula Two that day. Brise drove the FW03, outqualified Merzario who drove the new FW04 (18th and 25th), and went on to finish seventh in the race. Merzario withdrew from the race protesting that the barriers were not bolted together properly. Later Rolf Stommelen's rear wing failed and he crashed into the crowd, killing five people. In Monaco, the grid was cut to just 18 cars after the accident in Spain, and Merzario failed to qualify the FW03 in 20th place. At the Belgian Grand Prix Merzario retired the FW03 with clutch failure on lap 2, and he subsequently left the team. In Sweden, Laffite was also absent, driving in Formula Two again, so Damien Magee was brought in to drive the FW03. He qualified 22nd and finished 14th while Ian Scheckter crashed out in the FW04.

Scheckter took over from Magee in the FW03 for the Dutch Grand Prix while Laffite drove the FW04 for the rest of the season. Scheckter qualified 19th and finished 12th. The FW03 was subsequently driven by a string of drivers on one-race deals, and results were poor. François Migault qualified down in 24th for his home race in France but failed to start after engine trouble. Jean-Pierre Jabouille was entered in the FW03 for the British Grand Prix but did not drive after Williams ran short of engines, and Ian Ashley crashed the FW03 heavily during practice for the German Grand Prix and suffered serious ankle injuries which led to him not starting. Laffite secured a surprise second place in the FW04, bringing a much-needed financial boost to the team.

With the FW03 repaired, Jo Vonlanthen was signed to drive in Austria, and he qualified down in 28th position. He retired from the race with engine failure. Vonlanthen also drove the FW03 in the non-championship Swiss Grand Prix, starting on the back row and finishing unclassified, nine laps down. Renzo Zorzi replaced him for the Italian Grand Prix, qualifying 22nd and finishing 14th. The FW03 was finally retired before the season-ending US Grand Prix, as a second FW04 had been built, although both cars failed to start.

Williams finished the season in ninth place in the Constructors' Championship with six points, although all had been scored by the new FW04.

== Apollon ==
In 1976 Frank Williams sold the FW03 to Loris Kessel, who heavily revised the car and renamed it the Apollon. Kessel entered this car in the 1976 Italian Grand Prix but did not run, and at the 1977 Italian Grand Prix he was over six seconds short of qualifying for the race before crashing in the last qualifying session.

== Complete Formula One World Championship results ==
(key)

Year	Entrant	Chassis	Engine	Tyres	Drivers	1	2	3	4	5	6	7	8	9	10	11	12	13	14	15	WCC	Points
1973	Frank Williams Racing Cars	Iso–Marlboro IR	Ford Cosworth DFV 3.0 V8	F		ARG	BRA	RSA	ESP	BEL	MON	SWE	FRA	GBR	NED	GER	AUT	ITA	CAN	USA	10th	2
1973	Frank Williams Racing Cars	Iso–Marlboro IR	Ford Cosworth DFV 3.0 V8	F	Howden Ganley				Ret	Ret	Ret	11	14	9	9	DNS	NC	NC	6	12	10th	2
1973	Frank Williams Racing Cars	Iso–Marlboro IR	Ford Cosworth DFV 3.0 V8	F	Nanni Galli				11	Ret	Ret										10th	2
1973	Frank Williams Racing Cars	Iso–Marlboro IR	Ford Cosworth DFV 3.0 V8	F	Tom Belsø							DNS									10th	2
1973	Frank Williams Racing Cars	Iso–Marlboro IR	Ford Cosworth DFV 3.0 V8	F	Henri Pescarolo								Ret			10					10th	2
1973	Frank Williams Racing Cars	Iso–Marlboro IR	Ford Cosworth DFV 3.0 V8	F	Graham McRae									Ret							10th	2
1973	Frank Williams Racing Cars	Iso–Marlboro IR	Ford Cosworth DFV 3.0 V8	F	Gijs van Lennep										6		9	Ret			10th	2
1973	Frank Williams Racing Cars	Iso–Marlboro IR	Ford Cosworth DFV 3.0 V8	F	Tim Schenken														14		10th	2
1973	Frank Williams Racing Cars	Iso–Marlboro IR	Ford Cosworth DFV 3.0 V8	F	Jacky Ickx															7	10th	2
1974	Frank Williams Racing Cars	Iso–Marlboro FW	Ford Cosworth DFV 3.0 V8	F		ARG	BRA	RSA	ESP	BEL	MON	SWE	NED	FRA	GBR	GER	AUT	ITA	CAN	USA	10th	4
1974	Frank Williams Racing Cars	Iso–Marlboro FW	Ford Cosworth DFV 3.0 V8	F	Arturo Merzario	Ret	Ret	6	Ret	Ret	Ret		Ret	9	Ret	Ret	Ret	4	Ret	Ret	10th	4
1974	Frank Williams Racing Cars	Iso–Marlboro FW	Ford Cosworth DFV 3.0 V8	F	Richard Robarts							DNS									10th	4
1974	Frank Williams Racing Cars	Iso–Marlboro FW	Ford Cosworth DFV 3.0 V8	F	Tom Belsø			Ret	DNQ			8			DNQ						10th	4
1974	Frank Williams Racing Cars	Iso–Marlboro FW	Ford Cosworth DFV 3.0 V8	F	Gijs van Lennep					14			DNQ								10th	4
1974	Frank Williams Racing Cars	Iso–Marlboro FW	Ford Cosworth DFV 3.0 V8	F	Jean-Pierre Jabouille									DNQ							10th	4
1974	Frank Williams Racing Cars	Iso–Marlboro FW	Ford Cosworth DFV 3.0 V8	F	Jacques Laffite											Ret	NC	Ret	15	Ret	10th	4
1975	Frank Williams Racing Cars	Williams FW02	Ford Cosworth DFV 3.0 V8	G		ARG	BRA	RSA	ESP	MON	BEL	SWE	NED	FRA	GBR	GER	AUT	ITA	USA		9th	6*
1975	Frank Williams Racing Cars	Williams FW02	Ford Cosworth DFV 3.0 V8	G	Jacques Laffite	Ret	11	NC													9th	6*
1975	Frank Williams Racing Cars	Williams FW03	Ford Cosworth DFV 3.0 V8	G	Arturo Merzario	NC	Ret	Ret		DNQ	Ret										9th	6*
1975	Frank Williams Racing Cars	Williams FW03	Ford Cosworth DFV 3.0 V8	G	Tony Brise				7												9th	6*
1975	Frank Williams Racing Cars	Williams FW03	Ford Cosworth DFV 3.0 V8	G	Damien Magee							14									9th	6*
1975	Frank Williams Racing Cars	Williams FW03	Ford Cosworth DFV 3.0 V8	G	Ian Scheckter								12								9th	6*
1975	Frank Williams Racing Cars	Williams FW03	Ford Cosworth DFV 3.0 V8	G	François Migault									DNS							9th	6*
1975	Frank Williams Racing Cars	Williams FW03	Ford Cosworth DFV 3.0 V8	G	Ian Ashley											DNS					9th	6*
1975	Frank Williams Racing Cars	Williams FW03	Ford Cosworth DFV 3.0 V8	G	Jo Vonlanthen												Ret				9th	6*
1975	Frank Williams Racing Cars	Williams FW03	Ford Cosworth DFV 3.0 V8	G	Renzo Zorzi													14			9th	6*

* All points scored by the Williams FW04

== Non-championship Formula One results ==
(key) (Races in bold indicate pole position) (Races in italics indicate fastest lap)

Year	Entrant	Chassis	Engine	Driver	Tyres	1	2	3
1974	Frank Williams Racing Cars	Iso–Marlboro FW	Ford Cosworth DFV 3.0 V8		F	PRE	ROC	INT
1974	Frank Williams Racing Cars	Iso–Marlboro FW	Ford Cosworth DFV 3.0 V8	Arturo Merzario	F	3		
1975	Frank Williams Racing Cars	Williams FW02	Ford Cosworth DFV 3.0 V8		G	ROC	INT	SUI
1975	Frank Williams Racing Cars	Williams FW02	Ford Cosworth DFV 3.0 V8	Maurizio Flammini	G	DNS		
1975	Frank Williams Racing Cars	Williams FW03	Ford Cosworth DFV 3.0 V8	Arturo Merzario	G	7	DNS	
1975	Frank Williams Racing Cars	Williams FW03	Ford Cosworth DFV 3.0 V8	Jo Vonlanthen	G			NC
