= John Nielsen =

John Nielsen may refer to:

- John Nielsen (footballer, born 1911)
- John Nielsen (footballer, born 1946), Danish player
- John Nielsen (footballer, born 1972), Danish player
- John Nielsen (racing driver) (born 1956), Danish auto racer
- Johnny Nielsen (born 1941), Danish wrestler
- John M. Nielson (born 1943), American minister in the Church of the Nazarene
- John Nielsen (born 1961), American nature writer and NPR science reporter, see National Outdoor Book Award

== See also ==
- John Neilson (disambiguation)
- Jack Nielsen (disambiguation)
- John Nielsen-Gammon (born 1962), American meteorologist, climatologist and academic
- Timothy John Nielsen (born 1968), English-born Australian first-class cricketer
- Nielsen (disambiguation)
