= Wilhelm Nielsen =

Wilhelm Nielsen can refer to:

- Wilhelm Nielsen (Danish footballer)
- Wilhelm Nielsen (Norwegian footballer)
- Wilhelm Nielsen (politician)
