= Nielsen =

Nielsen may refer to:

== Business ==
- Nielsen Gallery, an American commercial art gallery
- Nielsen Holdings, global information, data, and measurement company
  - Nielsen Corporation, a marketing research firm
  - Nielsen Audio, formerly Arbitron, which measures radio listenership
  - Nielsen Broadcast Data Systems, a service also known as BDS that tracks monitored radio, television, and internet airplay of songs
  - Nielsen Media Research, the company that creates the Nielsen ratings
    - Nielsen ratings, a rating system used to gauge audience measurement of television programming habits in the United States
- Nielsen Norman Group, a computer user interface and user experience consulting firm

== Other uses ==
- Nielsen (surname), including a list of people
- Nielsen (crater), a lunar impact crater on the Oceanus Procellarum
- Nielsen–Olesen vortex, a point-like object localized in two spatial dimensions or a classical solution of field theory with the same property
- Nielsen fixed-point theorem
- Nielsen Fjord
- Nielsen Glacier
- Nielsen Park She-Oak

== See also ==
- Neilsen (disambiguation)
- Neilson (disambiguation)
- Nielson
- Nilsen
- Nilsson
