= John Neilson =

John Neilson may refer to:

- John Neilson (colonel) (1745–1833), New Jersey officer and member of the New Jersey legislature
- John Neilson (architect) (c. 1770–1827), Irish-born American master carpenter, joiner and architect
- John Neilson (Lower Canada politician) (1776–1848), a Canadian newspaper editor and politician.
- John Alexander Neilson (1858–1915), Scottish rugby union player
- Shaw Neilson (1872–1942), Australian poet
- John Neilson (footballer, born 1874) (fl. 1900s), Scottish footballer
- John Neilson (footballer, born 1921) (1921–1988), Scottish footballer

== See also ==
- John Nielsen (disambiguation)
- John Neilson Gladstone
- John Neilson Lake
