= Jan Magnussen =

Danish racing driver (born 1973)

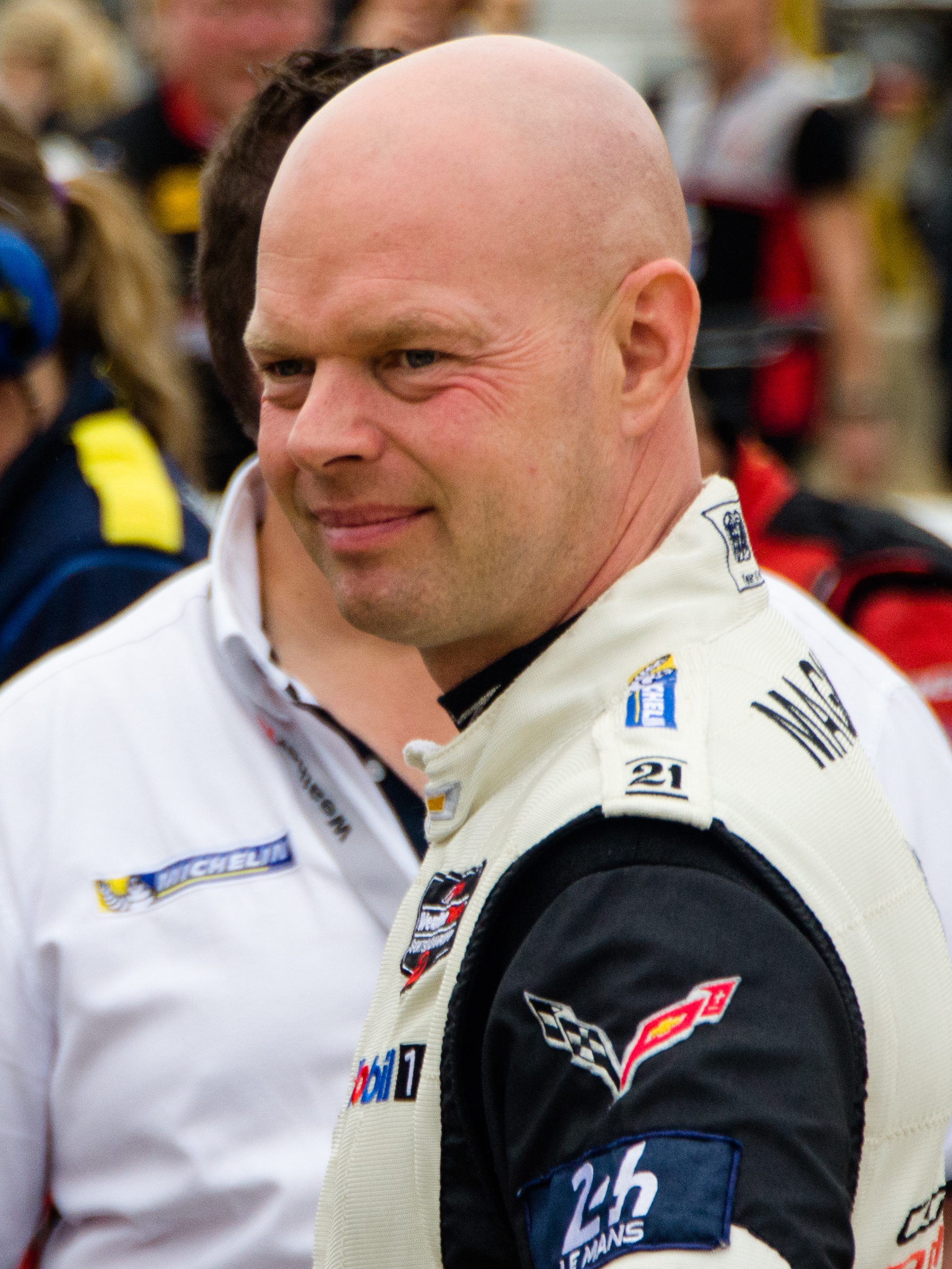
- Magnussen at the 2017 Petit Le Mans
- Born: Jan Ellegaard Magnussen; 4 July 1973 (age 53) Roskilde, Denmark
- Categorisation: FIA Platinum (until 2021); FIA Gold (2022–)
Jan Magnussen
Formula One World Championship career
- Nationality: (Denmark) Danish
- Active years: 1995, 1997–1998
- Team(s): McLaren, Stewart
- Entries: 25 (24 starts)
- Championships: 0
- Wins: 0
- Podiums: 0
- Career points: 1
- Pole positions: 0
- Fastest laps: 0
- First entry: 1995 Pacific Grand Prix
- Last entry: 1998 Canadian Grand Prix
NASCAR Cup Series career
- 1 race run over 1 year
- Best finish: 63rd (2010)
- First race: 2010 Toyota/Save Mart 350 (Infineon Raceway)
Wins	Top tens	Poles
0	0	0
24 Hours of Le Mans career
- Years: 1999 – Starts as of 2018: 20 races
- Teams: Panoz, Audi Sport Japan Team Goh, Corvette Racing
- Best finish: 4th (2003), (2006)
- Class wins: 4 (2004, 2005, 2006, 2009)
Jan Magnussen
Champ Car career
- 11 races run over 2 years
- Teams: Marlboro Team Penske (1996); Hogan Penske Racing (1996); Patrick Racing (1999)
- Best finish: 24th – 1996, 1999
- First race: 1996 Miller 200 (Mid-Ohio)
- Last race: 1999 Honda Indy 300 (Surfers Paradise)
Wins	Podiums	Poles
0	0	0
- Statistics up to date as of 5 June 2012.

Jan Ellegaard Magnussen (born 4 July 1973) is a Danish professional racing driver and was a factory driver for General Motors until the end of the 2020 season. He has competed in Championship Auto Racing Teams (CART), NASCAR, the FIA Formula One World Championship and the 24 Hours of Le Mans. With the Corvette Racing team, Magnussen won the 24 Hours of Le Mans in class on four occasions, in 2004, 2005, 2006 and 2009, as well as the IMSA Sportscar Championship twice in 2017 and 2018. He also won the 2015 24 Hours of Daytona in the GTLM class.

== Career history ==
=== Lower series racing ===
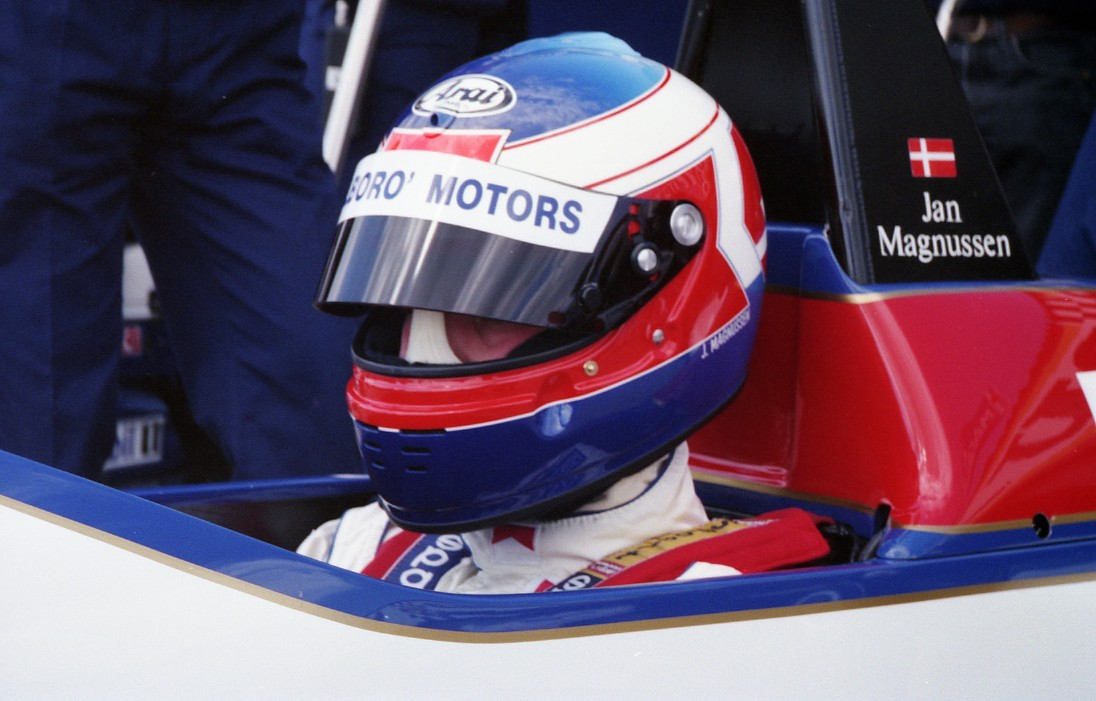
Jan Magnussen, Silverstone British F3 1994

Born in Roskilde, Magnussen won the 1992 Formula Ford Festival at Brands Hatch, then dominated the 1994 British Formula 3 championship with Paul Stewart Racing, winning fourteen of the eighteen events and breaking Ayrton Senna's F3 record. Magnussen scored his first British F3 win that April at Donington Park, also taking pole for the race. He also won at Brands Hatch, twice at Silverstone, and at Thruxton. He won six of the first eight races. He then won again at Donington Park, and both season-ending rounds at Silverstone.

=== Major series racing ===
Magnussen made his Formula One debut at the 1995 Pacific Grand Prix in Aida, sitting in for Mika Häkkinen, who was unwell; becoming the first Danish to race in the category since Tom Belsø in 1974. In 1996, Magnussen drove in the CART series and International Touring Car Championship.

For 1997–1998, Magnussen had a seat in Formula One with the newly founded Stewart Grand Prix team, owned in part by his old F3 boss Paul Stewart. Team founder Jackie Stewart once described him as "the most talented young driver to emerge since Ayrton Senna", but his performance was underwhelming. He scored his only championship point in his last race in F1, the 1998 Canadian Grand Prix; for the rest of the season he was replaced by Jos Verstappen. Magnussen started 24 GPs, one less than he entered, because his car was damaged in an accident during the start of the 1997 Brazilian Grand Prix causing him to retire before the restart.

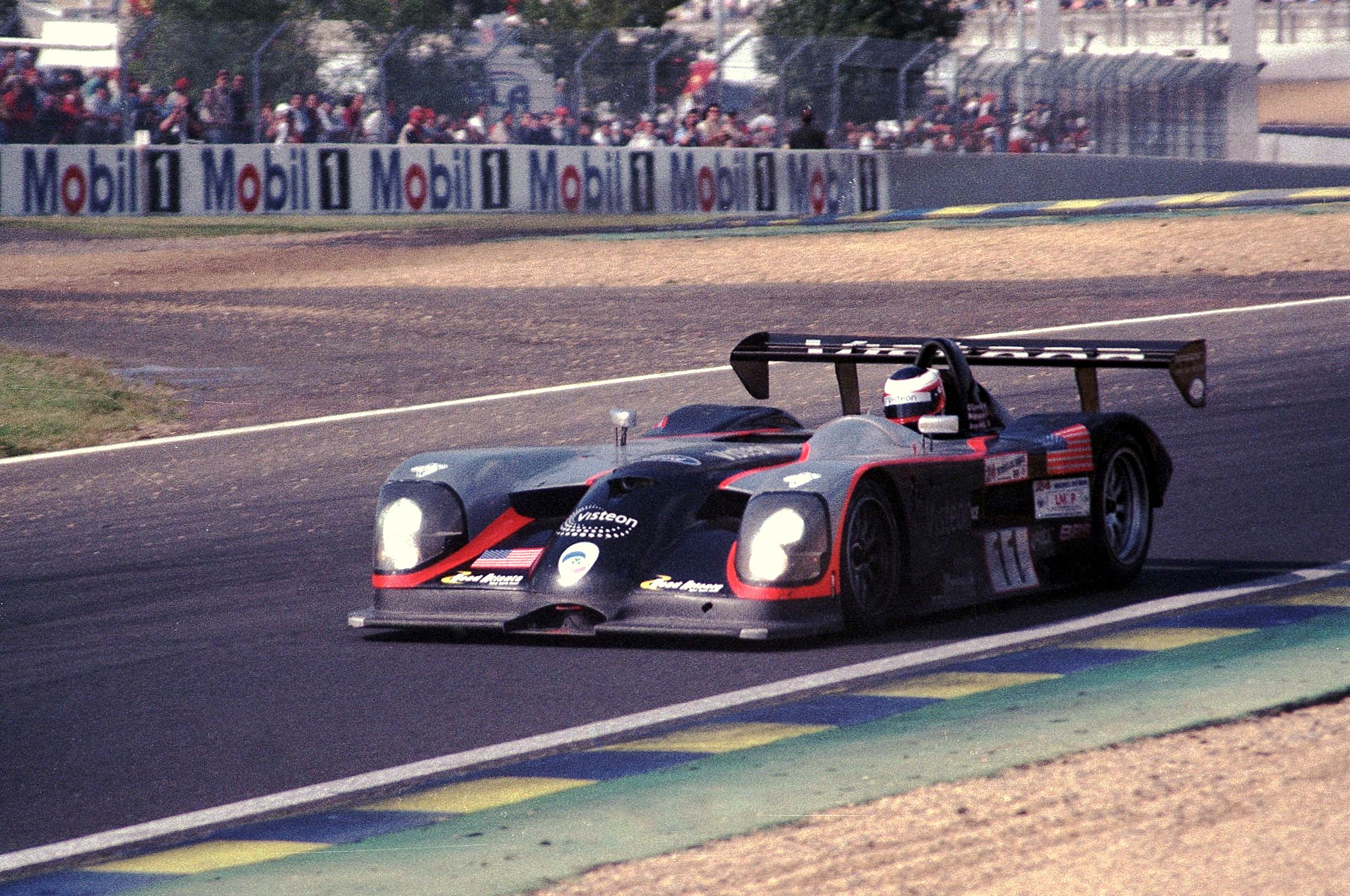
Magnussen driving the No. 11 Panoz LMP-1 at the 1999 24 Hours of Le Mans

In 1999, Magnussen participated in seven CART races. In 1999 and 2000, he raced in the American Le Mans Series with Panoz. In 2001, he drove a Peugeot in Danish Touring Car series (DTC) and raced in eight ALMS races. 2002 he also raced for Peugeot in DTC and in ten ALMS races. Magnussen won the 2008 GT1 and 2013 GT drivers' championships, both with Corvette Racing.

Magnussen has participated in various classes in the 24 hours of Le Mans every year since 1999. His best results so far are the victories in the GTS class in 2004 and GT1 class in 2005, 2006, and 2009, each time in a Chevrolet Corvette with Oliver Gavin and Olivier Beretta as teammates in 2005 and 2006, and Johnny O'Connell and Antonio García in 2009.

Also, Magnussen has participated in the 12 Hours of Sebring every year since 1999, winning the GT1 class in 2006, 2008, and 2009.

In 2005, Magnussen drove a Toyota Corolla in the Danish Touring Car Championship.

=== Present day ===
Magnussen was still an active driver, competing in the Danish Touring Car Championship (DTC) until 2010 and in a Chevrolet Corvette C7.R in the WeatherTech SportsCar Championship with Antonio Garcia as teammate until 2019 – and in the 24 hours of Le Mans. In the Danish Touring Car series, he drove a Chevrolet Lacetti for Perfection Racing. He won the DTC in 2003 and 2008.

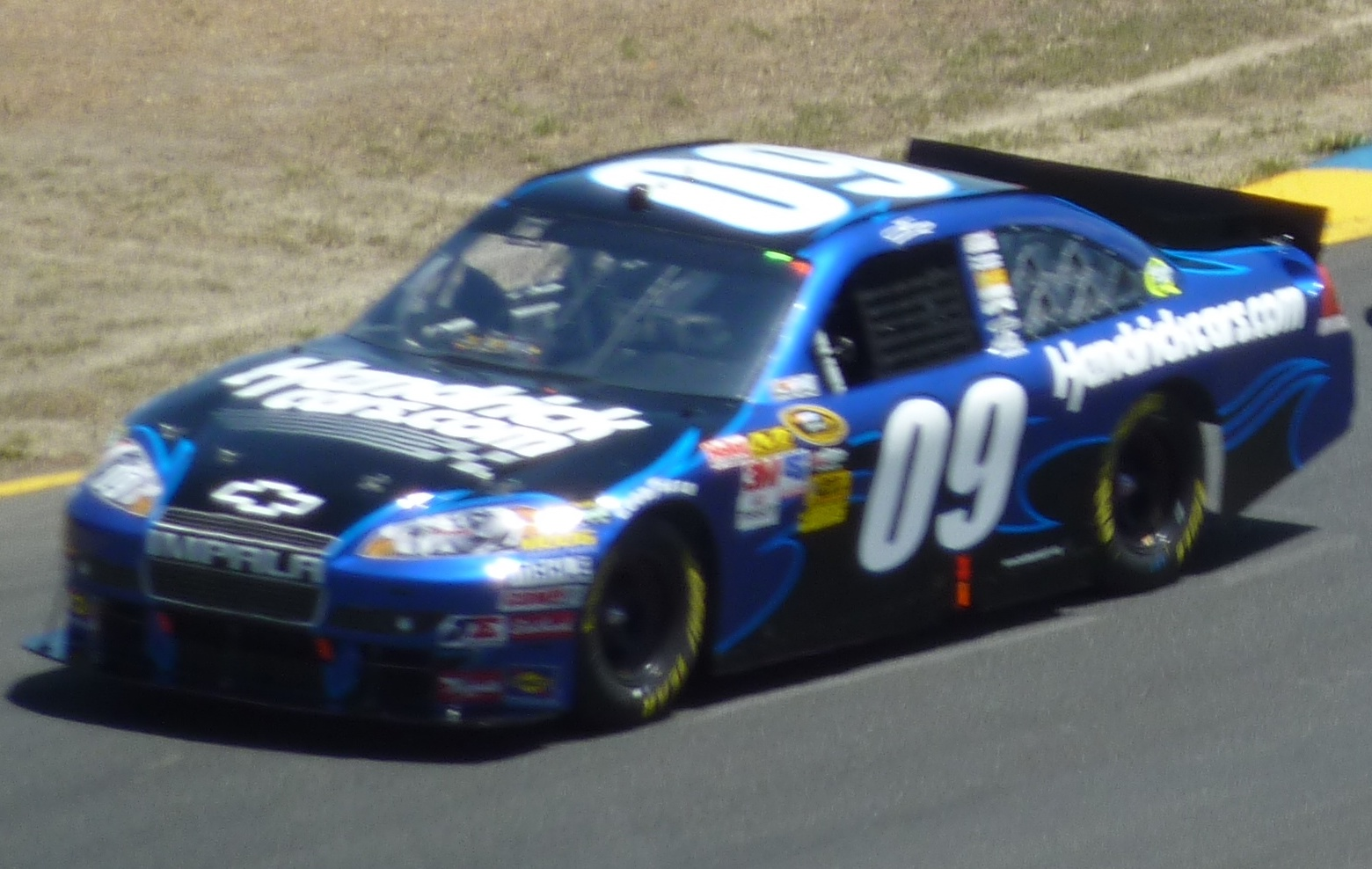
Magnussen's No. 09 car at Sonoma Raceway in 2010

On 11 June 2010, it was announced that Magnussen would make his NASCAR Sprint Cup Series debut driving the No. 09 HendrickCars.com Chevrolet for Phoenix Racing at Infineon Raceway. After starting 32nd on the grid, he finished in twelfth position.

On 14 June 2010, it was announced that Magnussen and Perfection Racing would not be participating in the DTC, leaving Magnussen and the team to focus on the Scandinavian Touring Car Cup's remaining two rounds.

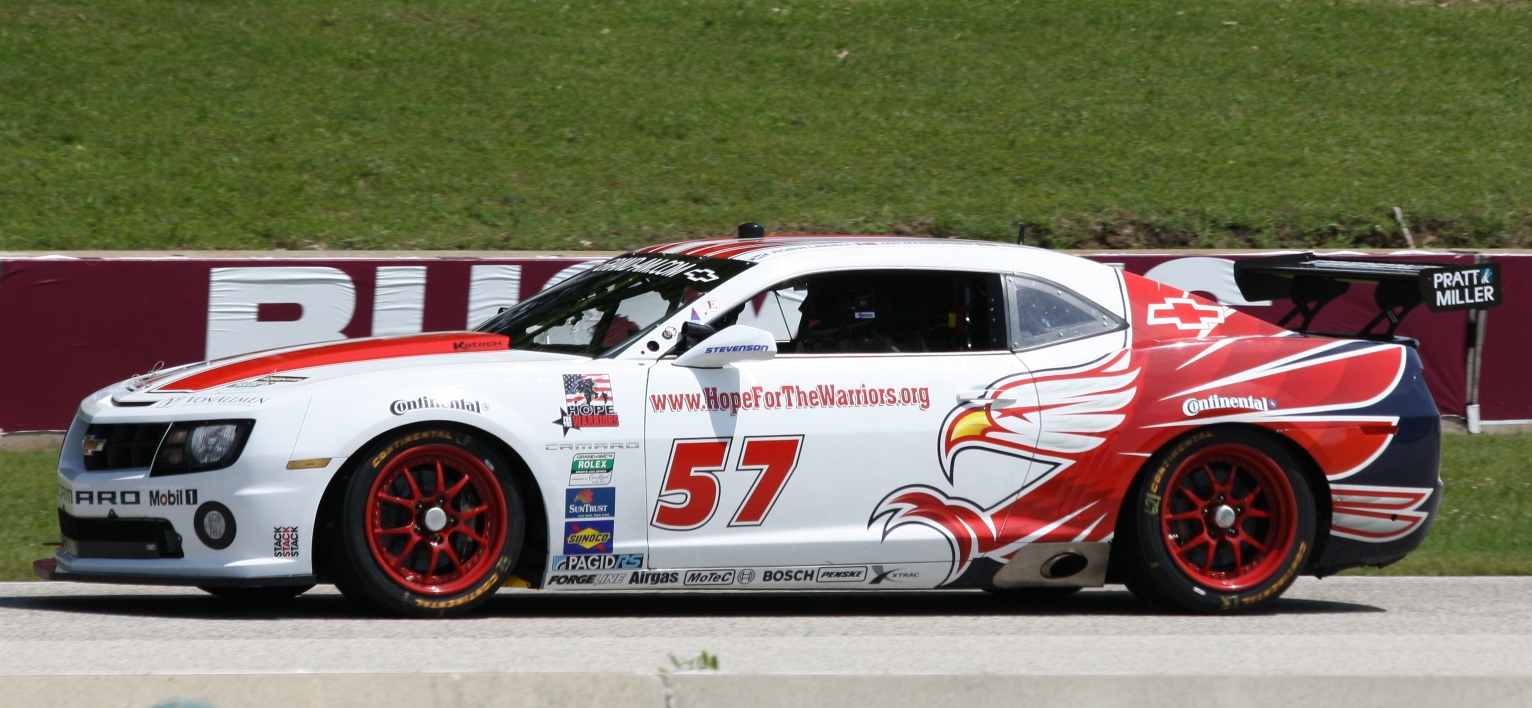
2011 Rolex Sports Car

Magnussen drove the No. 57 Stevenson Motorsports Chevrolet Camaro with Robin Liddell and Andrew Davis in the 2010 GRAND-AM Rolex Sports Car Series season opener, the Rolex 24 at Daytona. Following the Rolex 24, he moved to the team's No. 97 car and competed in the majority of the races with Gunter Schaldach. Magnussen finished 24th in GT points and his best finish was second (Miller) with four top-tens.

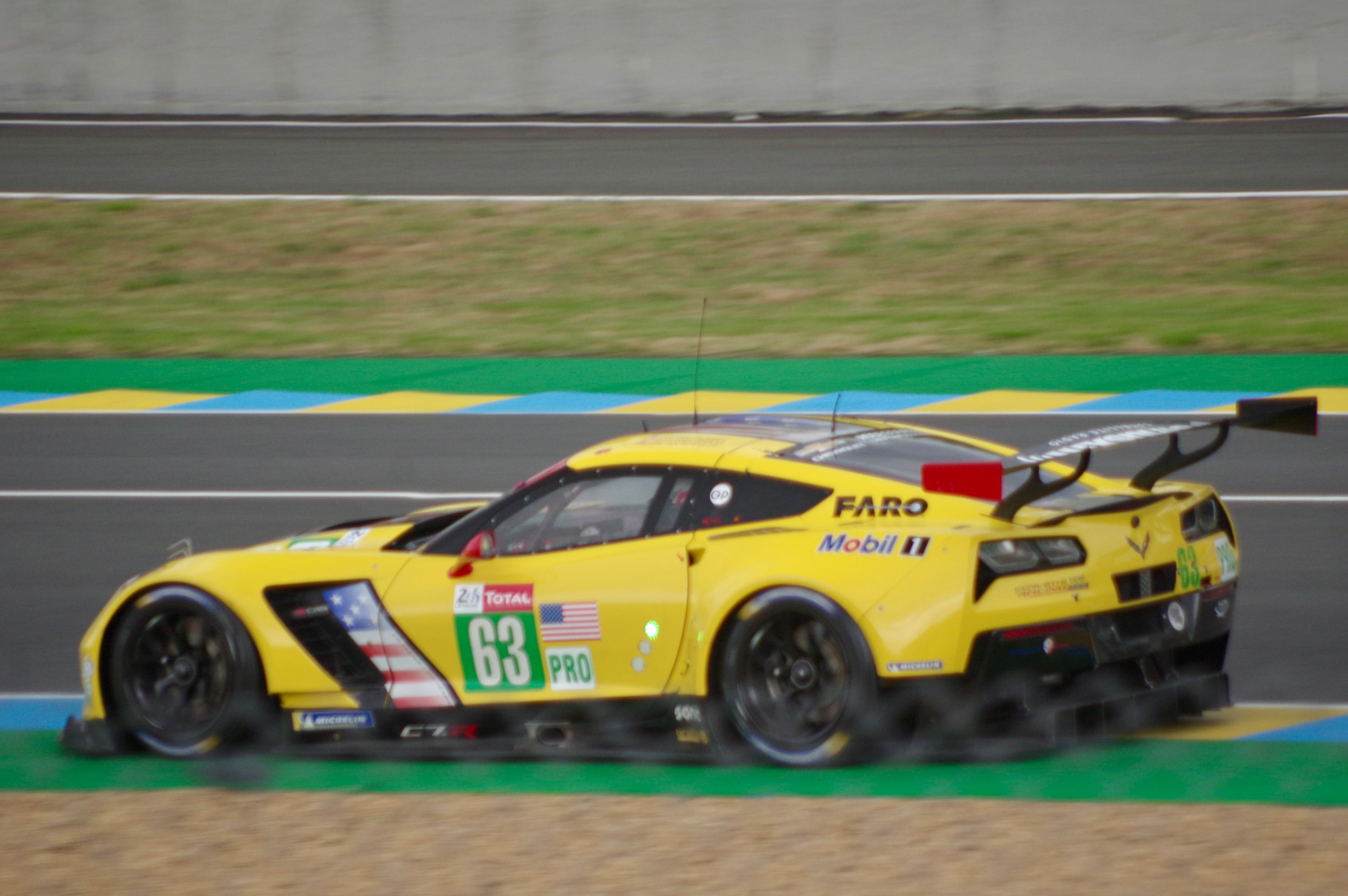
The No. 63 Corvette C7.R belonging to Magnussen, Garcia, and Rockenfeller at the 2019 24 Hours of Le Mans

On 7 November 2019, Magnussen was confirmed to drive in the inaugural TCR Denmark Touring Car Series for LM Racing in a VW Golf GTI TCR.

On 22 July 2023, Magnussen won Aurum 1006 km endurance race in Lithuania, driving a Mercedes-Benz AMG GT3 Evo.

On 16 September 2024, it was announced that Magnussen would take part in the Walter Hayes Trophy at Silverstone in November, driving a GT Motorsport-prepared Van Diemen RF78 in the same Duckhams colours that adorned his car at the 1992 Formula Ford Festival

== Family ==
Magnussen's oldest son Kevin is also a racing driver currently competing in the FIA World Endurance Championship and IMSA WeatherTech SportsCar Championship with BMW, having previously competed in Formula One with Haas, McLaren and Renault. Kevin mentioned that his father was his first hero when he was a child.

Other racing drivers in Magnussen's family are his nephew Dennis Lind, and Jan's youngest son Luca.

== Motorsports career results ==
=== British Formula Three ===
(key) (Races in bold indicate pole position) (Races in italics indicate fastest lap)

Year	Entrant	Engine	1	2	3	4	5	6	7	8	9	10	11	12	13	14	15	16	17	18	DC	Pts
1993	Paul Stewart Racing	Mugen-Honda	SIL	THR	BRH	DON	BRH	SIL	OUL	DON	SIL	DON	SNE	PEM	SIL	SIL; 4	THR; 3				11th	7
1994	Paul Stewart Racing	Mugen-Honda	SIL; 3	**DON**; 1	**BRH**; 1	**BRH**; 4	**SIL**; 1	**SIL**; 1	BRH; 1	THR; 1	**OUL**; 1	**DON**; 1	SIL; 7	SNE; Ret	PEM; 1	**PEM**; 1	**SIL**; 1	**SIL**; 1	THR; 1	SIL; 1	**1st**	**308**

=== Formula One ===
(key)

Formula One results
Year	Entrant	Chassis	Engine	1	2	3	4	5	6	7	8	9	10	11	12	13	14	15	16	17	WDC	Points
1995	Marlboro McLaren Mercedes	McLaren MP4/10B	Mercedes FO 110 3.0 V10	BRA	ARG	SMR	ESP	MON	CAN	FRA	GBR	GER	HUN	BEL	ITA	POR	EUR	PAC; 10	JPN	AUS	NC	0
1997	HSBC Malaysia Stewart Ford	Stewart SF01	Ford VJ Zetec-R 3.0 V10	AUS; Ret	BRA; DNS	ARG; 10^{†}	SMR; Ret	MON; 7	ESP; 13	CAN; Ret	FRA; Ret	GBR; Ret	GER; Ret	HUN; Ret	BEL; 12	ITA; Ret	AUT; Ret	LUX; Ret	JPN; Ret	EUR; 9	20th	0
1998	HSBC Stewart Ford	Stewart SF02	Ford VJ Zetec-R 3.0 V10	AUS; Ret	BRA; 10	ARG; Ret	SMR; Ret	ESP; 12	MON; Ret	CAN; 6	FRA	GBR	AUT	GER	HUN	BEL	ITA	LUX	JPN		17th	1

^{†} Driver did not finish the Grand Prix, but was classified as he had completed over 90% of the race distance.

=== Deutsche Tourenwagen Meisterschaft ===
(key) (Races in bold indicate pole position) (Races in italics indicate fastest lap)

Deutsche Tourenwagen Meisterschaft results
Year	Team	Car	1	2	3	4	5	6	7	8	9	10	11	12	13	14	Pos.	Pts
1995	AMG-Mercedes	Mercedes C-Class V6	HOC; 1; 4	HOC; 2 Ret	AVU; 1 Ret	AVU; 2; 7	NOR; 1 DNS	NOR; 2 DNS	DIE; 1; 14	DIE; 2; 5	NÜR; 1 Ret	NÜR; 2; 7	ALE; 1; 4	ALE; 2; 2	HOC; 1 Ret	HOC; 2; 9	8th	49

=== International Touring Car Championship ===
(key) (Races in bold indicate pole position) (Races in italics indicate fastest lap)

International Touring Car Championship results
Year	Team	Car	1	2	3	4	5	6	7	8	9	10	11	12	13	14	15	16	17	18	19	20	21	22	23	24	25	26	Pos.	Pts
1995	AMG-Mercedes	Mercedes C-Class V6	MUG; 1; 3	MUG; 2; 6	HEL; 1 Ret	HEL; 2; 2	DON; 1	DON; 2	EST; 1; 2	EST; 2; 1	MAG; 1; 2	MAG; 2; 11																	**2nd**	**83**
1996	Warsteiner Mercedes-AMG	Mercedes C-Class	HOC; 1; 2	HOC; 2; 1	NÜR; 1; 7	NÜR; 2; 3	EST; 1 Ret	EST; 2 Ret	HEL; 1 Ret	HEL; 2 DNS	NOR; 1; 17†	NOR; 2 DNS	DIE; 1; 16	DIE; 2 Ret	SIL; 1	SIL; 2	NÜR; 1	NÜR; 2	MAG; 1 Ret	MAG; 2 Ret	MUG; 1 Ret	MUG; 2; 5	HOC; 1 Ret	HOC; 2; 4	INT; 1; 14	INT; 2; 3	SUZ; 1; 7	SUZ; 2; 3	10th	97

† – Did not finish the race, but was classified as he completed over 90% of the race distance.

=== American open-wheel racing results ===
(key) (Races in bold indicate pole position, races in italics indicate fastest race lap)

==== CART ====
Year	Team	No.	Chassis	Engine	1	2	3	4	5	6	7	8	9	10	11	12	13	14	15	16	17	18	19	20	Rank	Points	Ref
1996	Team Penske	3	Penske PC-25	Mercedes-Benz IC108C	MIA	RIO	SRF	LBH	NZR	500	MIL	DET	POR	CLE	TOR	MIS	MOH; 14								**24th**	**5**	
1996	Hogan Penske	9	Penske PC-25	Mercedes-Benz IC108C														ROA; 26	VAN; 22	LS; 8					**24th**	**5**	
1999	Patrick Racing	20	Swift 010.c	Ford XD	MIA	MOT	LBH	NZR	RIO	STL	MIL	POR	CLE	ROA	TOR	MIS	DET; 18								**24th**	**8**	
1999	Patrick Racing	20	Reynard 99i	Ford XD														MOH; 14	CHI; 24	VAN; 7	LS; 17	HOU; 13	SRF; 11	FON	**24th**	**8**	

=== 24 Hours of Le Mans ===
24 Hours of Le Mans results
Year	Team	Co-drivers	Car	Class	Laps	Pos.	Class pos.
1999	(United States) Panoz Motorsports	(United States) Johnny O'Connell (Italy) Max Angelelli	Panoz LMP-1 Roadster-S-Ford	LMP	323	11th	9th
2000	(United States) Panoz Motorsports	(Australia) David Brabham (United States) Mario Andretti	Panoz LMP-1 Roadster-S-Élan	LMP900	315	15th	8th
2001	(United States) Panoz Motorsports	(Australia) David Brabham (France) Franck Lagorce	Panoz LMP07-Élan	LMP900	85	DNF	DNF
2002	(United States) Panoz Motor Sports	(Australia) David Brabham (United States) Bryan Herta	Panoz LMP01 Evo-Élan	LMP900	90	DNF	DNF
2003	Audi Sport Japan Team Goh	(Japan) Seiji Ara (Germany) Marco Werner	Audi R8	LMP900	370	4th	**2nd**
2004	(United States) Corvette Racing	(United Kingdom) Oliver Gavin (Monaco) Olivier Beretta	Chevrolet Corvette C5-R	GTS	345	6th	**1st**
2005	(United States) Corvette Racing	(United Kingdom) Oliver Gavin (Monaco) Olivier Beretta	Chevrolet Corvette C6.R	GT1	349	5th	**1st**
2006	(United States) Corvette Racing	(United Kingdom) Oliver Gavin (Monaco) Olivier Beretta	Chevrolet Corvette C6.R	GT1	355	4th	**1st**
2007	(United States) Corvette Racing	(United States) Johnny O'Connell (Canada) Ron Fellows	Chevrolet Corvette C6.R	GT1	342	6th	**2nd**
2008	(United States) Corvette Racing	(United States) Johnny O'Connell (Canada) Ron Fellows	Chevrolet Corvette C6.R	GT1	344	14th	**2nd**
2009	(United States) Corvette Racing	(United States) Johnny O'Connell (Spain) Antonio García	Chevrolet Corvette C6.R	GT1	342	15th	**1st**
2010	(United States) Corvette Racing	(United States) Johnny O'Connell (Spain) Antonio García	Chevrolet Corvette C6.R	GT2	225	DNF	DNF
2011	(United States) Corvette Racing	(United Kingdom) Oliver Gavin (United Kingdom) Richard Westbrook	Chevrolet Corvette C6.R	GTE; Pro	211	DNF	DNF
2012	(United States) Corvette Racing	(Spain) Antonio García (United States) Jordan Taylor	Chevrolet Corvette C6.R	GTE; Pro	326	23rd	5th
2013	(United States) Corvette Racing	(Spain) Antonio García (United States) Jordan Taylor	Chevrolet Corvette C6.R	GTE; Pro	312	19th	4th
2014	(United States) Corvette Racing	(Spain) Antonio García (United States) Jordan Taylor	Chevrolet Corvette C7.R	GTE; Pro	338	14th	**2nd**
2015	(United States) Corvette Racing	(Spain) Antonio García (Australia) Ryan Briscoe	Chevrolet Corvette C7.R	GTE; Pro	0	DNS	DNS
2016	(United States) Corvette Racing - GM	(Spain) Antonio García (United States) Ricky Taylor	Chevrolet Corvette C7.R	GTE; Pro	336	25th	7th
2017	(United States) Corvette Racing - GM	(Spain) Antonio García (United States) Jordan Taylor	Chevrolet Corvette C7.R	GTE; Pro	340	19th	**3rd**
2018	(United States) Corvette Racing - GM	(Spain) Antonio García (Germany) Mike Rockenfeller	Chevrolet Corvette C7.R	GTE; Pro	342	18th	4th
2019	(United States) Corvette Racing	(Spain) Antonio García (Germany) Mike Rockenfeller	Chevrolet Corvette C7.R	GTE; Pro	337	28th	8th
2020	(United Kingdom) JMW Motorsport	(United States) Richard Heistand (United States) Max Root	Ferrari 488 GTE Evo	GTE; Am	335	30th	6th
2021	(Denmark) High Class Racing	(Denmark) Anders Fjordbach (Denmark) Kevin Magnussen	Oreca 07-Gibson	LMP2	336	29th	17th
2023	(Poland) Inter Europol Competition	(Denmark) Anders Fjordbach (United States) Mark Kvamme	Oreca 07-Gibson	LMP2	117	DNF	DNF
2023	(Poland) Inter Europol Competition	(Denmark) Anders Fjordbach (United States) Mark Kvamme	Oreca 07-Gibson	LMP2 Pro-am	117	DNF	DNF

=== 24 Hours of Daytona ===
(key)

24 Hours of Daytona results
Year	Class	Team	Car	Co-drivers	Laps	Position	Class pos.
2005	DP	(United States) Doran Racing	Pontiac-Doran	(United States) Bobby Labonte (United States) Bryan Herta (United States) Terry Labonte	675	9 ^{DNF}	9 ^{DNF}
2006	GT	(United States) The Racer's Group	Pontiac GTO.R	(United States) Paul Edwards (United States) Kelly Collins (United Kingdom) Andy Pilgrim	633	26	13
2007	DP	(United States) SunTrust Racing	Pontiac Riley DP	(South Africa) Wayne Taylor (Italy) Max Angelelli (United States) Jeff Gordon	666	3	3
2008	GT	(United States) Banner Racing	Pontiac GXP.R	(United States) Paul Edwards (United States) Kelly Collins	647	17	7
2009	GT	(United States) Banner Racing	Pontiac GXP.R	(United States) Paul Edwards (United States) Kelly Collins	689	12	4
2010	GT	(United States) Stevenson Motorsports	Chevrolet Camaro GT.R	(United Kingdom) Robin Liddell (United States) Andrew Davis	683	11	4
2011	GT	(United States) Stevenson Motorsports	Chevrolet Camaro GT.R	(United Kingdom) Robin Liddell (Denmark) Ronnie Bremer	629	26	12
2012	DP	(United States) Spirit of Daytona Racing	Corvette DP	(Spain) Antonio García (United Kingdom) Oliver Gavin (United Kingdom) Richard Westbrook	629	8	8
2013	GT	(United States) Stevenson Motorsports	Chevrolet Camaro GT.R	(United States) John Edwards (United Kingdom) Robin Liddell (United States) Tommy Milner	595	36 ^{DNF}	23 ^{DNF}
2014	GTLM	(United States) Corvette Racing	Chevrolet Corvette C7.R	(Spain) Antonio García (Australia) Ryan Briscoe	329	60 ^{DNF}	10 ^{DNF}
2015	GTLM	(United States) Corvette Racing	Chevrolet Corvette C7.R	(Spain) Antonio García (Australia) Ryan Briscoe	725	4	1
2016	GTLM	(United States) Corvette Racing	Chevrolet Corvette C7.R	(Spain) Antonio García (Germany) Mike Rockenfeller	722	8	2
2017	GTLM	(United States) Corvette Racing	Chevrolet Corvette C7.R	(Spain) Antonio García (Germany) Mike Rockenfeller	652	8	4
2018	GTLM	(United States) Corvette Racing	Chevrolet Corvette C7.R	(Spain) Antonio García (Germany) Mike Rockenfeller	781	13	3
2019	GTLM	(United States) Corvette Racing	Chevrolet Corvette C7.R	(Spain) Antonio García (Germany) Mike Rockenfeller	563	16	6

=== Supercars Championship ===
Australian Supercars results
Year	Team	1	2	3	4	5	6	7	8	9	10	11	12	13	14	15	16	17	18	19	20	21	22	23	24	25	26	27	28	29	Final pos	Points
2003	Team Dynamik	ADL	PHI	ECK	WIN	PTH	HDV	QLD	ORP	SAN; WD†	BAT; 11	SUR	PUK	ECK																	NC	152
2011	Paul Morris Motorsport	YMC; R1	YMC; R2	ADE; R3	ADE; R4	HAM; R5	HAM; R6	PER; R7	PER; R8	PER; R9	WIN; R10	WIN; R11	HDV; R12	HDV; R13	TOW; R14	TOW; R15	QLD; R16	QLD; R17	QLD; R18	PHI; Q	PHI; R19	BAT; R20	SUR; R21; 22	SUR; R22; 8	SYM; R23	SYM; R24	SAN; R25	SAN; R26	SYD; R27	SYD; R28	67th	129

† Withdrew due to licence problems

=== Bathurst 1000 results ===
Year	Team	Car	Co-driver	Position	Laps
2003	Team Dynamik	Holden Commodore VY	(France) Nicolas Minassian	11th	158

=== European Touring Car Championship ===
(key) (Races in bold indicate pole position) (Races in italics indicate fastest lap)

European Touring Car Championship results
Year	Team	Car	1	2	3	4	5	6	7	8	9	10	11	12	13	14	15	16	17	18	19	20	DC	Pts
2004	Peugeot Sport Engineering	Peugeot 307 Gti	MNZ; 1	MNZ; 2	VAL; 1; 11	VAL; 2 Ret	MAG; 1; 19†	MAG; 2; 18†	HOC; 1; 10	HOC; 2; 12	BRN; 1; 15	BRN; 2 Ret	DON; 1; 19	DON; 2 Ret	SPA; 1; 17	SPA; 2; 18	IMO; 1	IMO; 2	OSC; 1	OSC; 2	DUB; 1; 12	DUB; 2 DNS	NC	0

=== Complete IMSA SportsCar Championship results ===
(key) (Races in bold indicate pole position) (Races in italics indicate fastest lap)

Year	Team	Class	Make	Engine	1	2	3	4	5	6	7	8	9	10	11	Pos.	Points
2014	Corvette Racing	GTLM	Chevrolet Corvette C7.R	Chevrolet 5.5L V8	DAY; 10	SEB; 8	**LBH**; 1	LGA; 1	WGL; 1	MOS; 1	IMS; 4	ROA; 6	VIR; 7†	COA; 9	PET; 8	9th	293
2015	Corvette Racing	GTLM	Chevrolet Corvette C7.R	Chevrolet 5.5L V8	DAY; 1	SEB; 1	LBH; 3	LGA; 7	**WGL**; 4	MOS; 3	ROA; 4	VIR; 6	COA; 6	PET; 6		3rd	295
2016	Corvette Racing	GTLM	Chevrolet Corvette C7.R	Chevrolet 5.5 L V8	DAY; 2	SEB; 9	LBH; 9	LGA; 4	WGL; 7	MOS; 3	LRP; 2	ROA; 6	**VIR**; 1	COA; 3	PET; 4	3rd	319
2017	Corvette Racing	GTLM	Chevrolet Corvette C7.R	Chevrolet 5.5 L V8	DAY; 4	SEB; 1	**LBH**; 5	COA; 1	WGL; 3	MOS; 4	LRP; 4	ROA; 4	VIR; 1	LGA; 4	PET; 2	1st	334
2018	Corvette Racing	GTLM	Chevrolet Corvette C7.R	Chevrolet LT5.5 5.5 L V8	**DAY**; 3	SEB; 8	LBH; 4	MOH; 3	WGL; 2	MOS; 2	**LRP**; 2	ROA; 3	VIR; 2	LGA; 3	PET; 8	1st	322
2019	Corvette Racing	GTLM	Chevrolet Corvette C7.R	Chevrolet LT5.5 5.5 L V8	DAY; 6	SEB; 3	LBH; 2	MOH; 2	**WGL**; 2	MOS; 7	LIM; 5	ELK; 4	VIR; 3	LGA; 3	PET; 4	3rd	317
2023	MDK Motorsports	GTD Pro	Porsche 911 GT3 R (992)	Porsche 4.2 L Flat-6	DAY; 6	SEB	LBH	LGA	WGL	MOS	LIM	ELK	VIR	IMS	PET	26th	250

^{†} Magnussen did not complete sufficient laps in order to score full points. ^{*} Season still in progress.

=== Complete TCR Denmark Touring Car Series results ===
(key) (Races in bold indicate pole position) (Races in italics indicate fastest lap)

Year	Team	Car	1	2	3	4	5	6	7	8	9	10	11	12	13	14	15	16	17	18	19	20	21	DC	Points
2020	LM Racing	Volkswagen Golf GTI TCR	JYL; 1; 3	JYL; 2; 4	JYL; 3 NC	JYL; 1; 7	JYL; 2 Ret	JYL; 3; 5	**JYL**; **4**; 2	JYL; 5 Ret	JYL; 6; 4	**DJU**; **1**; 1	DJU; 2; 2	DJU; 3; 1	PAD; 1 C	PAD; 2 C	PAD; 3 C	JYL; 1; 3	JYL; 2; 3	JYL; 3; 2				4th	215
2021	LM Racing	CUPRA León Competición TCR	**DJU**; **1**; 1	DJU; 2; 1	DJU; 3; 1	JYL; 1; 1	JYL; 2; 6	JYL; 3; 1	COP; 1 Ret	COP; 2 DNS	COP; 3 DNS	JYL; 1	JYL; 2	JYL; 3	**ARH**; **1**; 1	ARH; 2; 4	ARH; 3 DNS	JYL; 1; 2	JYL; 2; 1	JYL; 3; 2	PAD; 1; 1	PAD; 2; 3	PAD; 3; 3	3rd	309

=== Complete FIA World Endurance Championship results ===
(key) (Races in bold indicate pole position) (Races in italics indicate fastest lap)

Year	Entrant	Class	Chassis	Engine	1	2	3	4	5	6	Rank	Points
2021	High Class Racing	LMP2	Oreca 07	Gibson GK428 4.2 L V8	SPA; 9	ALG; 9	MNZ; 9	LMS	BHR	BHR	26th	7

=== NASCAR ===
(key) (Bold – Pole position awarded by qualifying time. Italics – Pole position earned by points standings or practice time. * – Most laps led.)

==== Sprint Cup Series ====
NASCAR Sprint Cup Series results
Year	Team	No.	Make	1	2	3	4	5	6	7	8	9	10	11	12	13	14	15	16	17	18	19	20	21	22	23	24	25	26	27	28	29	30	31	32	33	34	35	36	NSCC	Pts	Ref
2010	Phoenix Racing	09	Chevy	DAY	CAL	LVS	ATL	BRI	MAR	PHO	TEX	TAL	RCH	DAR	DOV	CLT	POC	MCH	SON; 12	NHA	DAY	CHI	IND	POC	GLN	MCH	BRI	ATL	RCH	NHA	DOV	KAN	CAL	CLT	MAR	TAL	TEX	PHO	HOM	63rd	127	

Sporting positions
Preceded by Marc Goossens	Formula Ford Festival; Winner; 1992	Succeeded by Russell Ingall
Preceded by Kelvin Burt	British Formula Three Champion; 1994	Succeeded by Oliver Gavin
Preceded by Jason Watt	Danish Touring Car Championship; Champion; 2003	Succeeded by Casper Elgaard
Preceded by Michel Nykjaer	Danish Touring Car Championship; Champion; 2008	Succeeded by Michel Nykjær
Preceded by Michael Christensen; Patrick Long	North American Endurance Cup; GTLM Champion; 2015; With: Antonio García	Succeeded by Oliver Gavin; Tommy Milner
Preceded by Oliver Gavin; Tommy Milner	WeatherTech SportsCar Championship; GTLM Champion; 2017-2018; With: Antonio García	Succeeded by Earl Bamber; Laurens Vanthoor
