= James Neilson =

James Neilson may refer to:

- James Beaumont Neilson (1792–1865), Scottish inventor of iron-smelting processes
- James Crawford Neilson (1816–1900), Baltimore, Maryland architect
- James Neilson (director) (1909–1979), film and television director
- James Neilson (footballer) (1887–1917), Scottish footballer
- James Neilson (racing driver) (died 1953), Scottish racing driver
- Jim Neilson (born 1941), a.k.a. James Anthony "Chief" Neilson, professional ice hockey player
