= Niels Nielsen =

Niels Nielsen may refer to:

- Niels Nielsen (rower) (born 1939), Danish Olympic rower
- Niels Nielsen (sailor) (1883–1961), Norwegian Olympic silver medalist in 1920
- Niels Kristian Nielsen (1897–1972), Danish gymnast at the 1920 Summer Olympics
- Niels Turin Nielsen (1887–1964), Danish gymnast at the 1908 and 1920 Summer Olympics
- Niels Erik Nielsen (1893–1974), Danish gymnast at the 1920 Summer Olympics
- Niels Nielsen (geographer) (1893–1981), Danish geographer
- Niels Nielsen (mathematician) (1865–1931), Danish mathematician
- Niels Nielsen (politician) (1869–1930), Danish-born Australian politician
- Niels Åge Nielsen, Danish professor of Nordic languages
- Niels Nielsen, caretaker of the Old Man of the Mountain

== See also ==
- Nils Nielsen
- Nils Nilsen
