= Hans Nilsson =

Hans Nilsson may refer to:

- Hans Nilsson (musician) (born 1972), Swedish drummer
- Hans Nilsson (canoeist) (born 1946), Swedish sprint canoer
- Hans Nilsson (footballer) (1941-2024), Swedish footballer and bandy player

== See also ==
- Hans Nilsen
- Hans Nielsen (disambiguation)
