= Nielson =

Nielson is a surname. Notable people with the surname include:

- Claire Nielson (1937–2026), Scottish actress
- Howard C. Nielson (1924–2020), American politician from Utah; U.S. Representative 1983–91
- Jens Nielson (1821–1906), Mormon leader
- Niel Nielson (born 1954), American academic; president of Covenant College, Georgia, United States
- Poul Nielson (born 1943), Danish politician and government minister
- Nielson (singer) (born 1989), Dutch singer-songwriter

== See also ==
- Neilson (disambiguation)
- Nielsen (disambiguation)
- Neilsen (disambiguation)
- Nilsen
