= Neilsen =

Neilsen is a less common spelling of the surnames Nielsen or Neilson. Notable people with the name include:

- Hans Peter Mareus Neilsen Gammel (1854–1931), a Danish-American author and publisher of books covering legislation in the state of Texas
- Lorri Neilsen Glenn, Canadian contemporary poet, ethnographer, and essayist
- Jade Neilsen (born 1991), Australian competition swimmer
- Philip Neilsen (born 1949), Australian contemporary poet and fiction writer
- Shirley Neilsen Blum (born 1932), American art historian, author, gallerist, and professor.

== See also ==
- Neilson (disambiguation)
- Nielsen (disambiguation)
- Nielson, surname
- Nilsen, surname
