= Hans Nielsen =

Hans Nielsen may refer to:

- Hans Nielsen (actor) (1911–1965), German actor
- Hans Nielsen (American football) (born 1952), Danish football player
- Hans Nielsen (composer) (1580–1626), Danish madrigal composer at the court of Christian IV
- Hans Nielsen (speedway rider) (born 1959), Danish speedway racer
- Hans Bruun Nielsen, Danish mathematician
- Hans Christian Nielsen (1928–1990), Danish footballer
- Hans Christian Nielsen (cyclist) (1916–2004), Danish cyclist
- Hans Frede Nielsen (1943–2021), Danish philologist
- Hans Jacob Nielsen (1899–1967), Danish boxer
- Hans Peter Nielsen (gymnast) (born 1943), Danish gymnast
- Hans Peter Nielsen (politician) (1852–1928), Danish farmer and politician

== See also ==
- Hans Nilsen
- Hans Nilsson (disambiguation)
