= Jonatan Nielsen =

Swedish professional ice hockey player (born 1993)

- Born: September 11, 1993 (age 32) Anderstorp, Sweden
- Height: 6 ft 3 in (191 cm)
- Weight: 183 lb (83 kg; 13 st 1 lb)
- Position: Defence
- Shoots: Left
- DEN team Former teams: Rødovre Mighty Bulls; Linköpings HC
- NHL draft: 194th overall, 2012; Florida Panthers
- Playing career: 2011–present

Jonatan Nielsen (born September 11, 1993) is a Swedish professional ice hockey player. He currently plays for Rødovre Mighty Bulls of Metal Ligaen, the top tier league in Denmark. Nielsen was selected 194th overall in the 2012 NHL entry draft by the Florida Panthers.

== Career statistics ==
=== Regular season and playoffs ===
			Regular season					Playoffs
Season	Team	League	GP	G	A	Pts	PIM	GP	G	A	Pts	PIM
2010–11	Linköpings HC	J20	29	2	1	3	6	3	0	0	0	0
2011–12	Linköpings HC	J20	38	5	4	9	24	6	1	3	4	0
2011–12	Linköpings HC	SEL	1	0	0	0	0	—	—	—	—	—
2012–13	Linköpings HC	J20	13	4	4	8	25	—	—	—	—	—
2012–13	Linköpings HC	SEL	6	0	0	0	0	—	—	—	—	—
2012–13	Södertälje SK	Allsv	28	4	4	8	8	10	0	0	0	2
2013–14	IF Troja/Ljungby	Allsv	44	1	4	5	8	—	—	—	—	—
2014–15	IF Troja/Ljungby	Div.1	35	9	17	26	14	7	2	3	5	6
2015–16	IF Troja/Ljungby	Div.1	36	6	19	25	12	16	4	9	13	4
2016–17	IF Troja/Ljungby	Div.1	30	9	16	25	16	16	1	6	7	4
2017–18	IF Troja/Ljungby	Allsv	50	10	14	24	6	—	—	—	—	—
2018–19	IF Troja/Ljungby	Div.1	37	8	18	26	18	4	0	1	1	4
2019–20	IF Troja/Ljungby	Div.1	37	7	23	30	16	6	2	2	4	2
2020–21	Rødovre Mighty Bulls	DEN	27	4	10	14	8	—	—	—	—	—
2021–22	Rødovre Mighty Bulls	DEN	31	3	12	15	12	—	—	—	—	—
SHL totals			7	0	0	0	0	—	—	—	—	—

=== International ===
Year	Team	Event	Result	GP	G	A	Pts	PIM
2010	Sweden	U17	3rd place, bronze medalist(s)	6	0	0	0	12
Junior totals				6	0	0	0	12
