= Charles Neilson =

Scottish footballer

Personal information
- Full name: Charles Neilson
- Date of birth: 27 November 1889
- Place of birth: Montrose, Scotland
- Date of death: 1 June 1916 (aged 26)
- Place of death: Neuville-Saint-Vaast, France
- Position: Outside left

Senior career*
| Years | Team | Apps | (Gls) |
| –1910 | Ellon United | | |
| 1910–1913 | Aberdeen | 8 | (0) |
| 1915 | Aberdeen | 0 | (0) |
- * Club domestic league appearances and goals

Charles Neilson (27 November 1889 – 1 June 1916) was a Scottish professional footballer who played as an outside left in the Scottish League for Aberdeen.

== Personal life ==
Neilson attended Ellon Primary School and graduated with an MA from Aberdeen University in 1913. He trained as a teacher at Aberdeen Training Centre and became a teaching assistant at Lossiemouth Public School. After the outbreak of the First World War in September 1914, Neilson enlisted as a private in the Gordon Highlanders in Peterhead. He was serving as a company sergeant major when he was killed in action near Neuville-Saint-Vaast, France on 1 June 1916. He was buried in Marœuil British Cemetery, near Arras. His brothers Rolland and James (the latter also a footballer) were also killed during the war. Neilson was added to the Aberdeen University Roll of Honour in 1921.

== Career statistics ==
Appearances and goals by club, season and competition
| Club | Season | League | | | Scottish Cup | | Other | | Total | |
| Club | Season | Division | Apps | Goals | Apps | Goals | Apps | Goals | Apps | Goals |
|---|---|---|---|---|---|---|---|---|---|---|
| Aberdeen | 1910–11 | Scottish First Division | 5 | 0 | 0 | 0 | — | | 5 | 0 |
| Aberdeen | 1911–12 | Scottish First Division | 3 | 0 | 0 | 0 | 1 (Note: Appearance in North East Cup) | 0 | 4 | 0 |
| Career total | | | 8 | 0 | 0 | 0 | 1 | 0 | 9 | 0 |
