= Jack Nielsen =

Jack Nielsen may refer to:

- Jack Nielsen (tennis) (1896–1981), Norwegian tennis player
- Jack Nielsen (skier) (born 1923), his son, Norwegian alpine skier
