= 1974 Swedish Grand Prix =

- Scandinavian Raceway

Race details
- Date: 9 June 1974
- Location: Anderstorp, Sweden
- Course: Permanent Racing Facility
- Course length: 4.018 km (2.497 miles)
- Distance: 80 laps, 321.440 km (199.734 miles)

Pole position
Driver	(France) Patrick Depailler	Tyrrell-Ford
- Time: 1:24.758

Fastest lap
Driver	(France) Patrick Depailler	Tyrrell-Ford
- Time: 1:27.262 on lap 72

Podium
First	(South Africa) Jody Scheckter	Tyrrell-Ford
Second	(France) Patrick Depailler	Tyrrell-Ford
Third	(United Kingdom) James Hunt	Hesketh-Ford

The 1974 Swedish Grand Prix was a Formula One motor race held at the Scandinavian Raceway in Anderstorp on 9 June 1974. It was race 7 of 15 in both the 1974 World Championship of Drivers and the 1974 International Cup for Formula One Manufacturers.

The race was dominated by the two Tyrrell-Cosworth 007s of Jody Scheckter and Patrick Depailler. Depailler took pole position, however Scheckter beat him by 0.380 sec in the race, to score his first Grand Prix win.

== Race summary ==
After Monaco, there were some new faces in the paddock. Brian Redman retired from Formula One, to be replaced by Bertil Roos whilst Reine Wisell took over at March from Hans-Joachim Stuck, Richard Robarts replaced Arturo Merzario after the Italian was unwell, and Leo Kinnunen made his début. Running with open helmet, as he was accustomed to do when rallying, this marked the last time that a driver did so in Formula One, and the first time a Finn had started a Formula One Grand Prix. Vern Schuppan, the first reserve of Ensign-Ford, started illegally from 26th place on the grid and completed the race before he was disqualified. Tom Belsø crashed his car in practice and with no spare car, Richard Robarts let the Danish driver have his car and did not start himself.

The two Tyrrells of Depailler and Scheckter secured the front row and dominated the race. Ronnie Peterson retired on lap eight with a driveshaft failure, shortly to be followed by Clay Regazzoni with gearbox problems. Niki Lauda and James Hunt had a duel for 20 laps before Hunt got past on lap 66 and began slicing into the Tyrrells' lead at two seconds a lap. In the end, Scheckter held on to take his first race win by 0.38s and Hunt took third place, the Hesketh team's first Formula One points. Graham Hill gained his first championship point since 1972, and the last of his career, whilst Tom Belsø drove to 8th place. At this Grand Prix Leo Kinnunen became the last driver to start in a Formula One race using an open-face helmet.

== Classification ==
=== Qualifying ===
Pos	No	Driver	Constructor	Time	Gap	Grid
1	4	(France) Patrick Depailler	Tyrrell-Ford	1:24.758	—	1
2	3	(South Africa) Jody Scheckter	Tyrrell-Ford	1:25.076	+0.380	2
3	12	(Austria) Niki Lauda	Ferrari	1:25.161	+0.403	3
4	11	(Switzerland) Clay Regazzoni	Ferrari	1:25.276	+0.518	4
5	1	(Sweden) Ronnie Peterson	Lotus-Ford	1:25.390	+0.632	5
6	24	(United Kingdom) James Hunt	Hesketh-Ford	1:25.556	+0.798	6
7	2	(Belgium) Jacky Ickx	Lotus-Ford	1:25.650	+0.892	7
8	17	(France) Jean-Pierre Jarier	Shadow-Ford	1:25.725	+0.967	8
9	5	(Brazil) Emerson Fittipaldi	McLaren-Ford	1:25.938	+1.180	9
10	7	(Argentina) Carlos Reutemann	Brabham-Ford	1:25.962	+1.204	10
11	33	(United Kingdom) Mike Hailwood	McLaren-Ford	1:26.040	+1.282	11
12	6	(New Zealand) Denny Hulme	McLaren-Ford	1:26.480	+1.722	12
13	14	(France) Jean-Pierre Beltoise	BRM	1:26.813	+2.055	13
14	28	(United Kingdom) John Watson	Brabham-Ford	1:27.100	+2.342	14
15	26	(United Kingdom) Graham Hill	Lola-Ford	1:27.173	+2.415	15
16	9	(Sweden) Reine Wisell	March-Ford	1:27.382	+2.624	16
17	10	(Italy) Vittorio Brambilla	March-Ford	1:27.390	+2.632	17
18	27	(United Kingdom) Guy Edwards	Lola-Ford	1:27.407	+2.649	18
19	15	(France) Henri Pescarolo	BRM	1:27.503	+2.745	19
20	8	(Liechtenstein) Rikky von Opel	Brabham-Ford	1:27.690	+2.932	20
21	21	(Denmark) Tom Belsø	Iso-Marlboro-Ford	1:27.889	+3.131	21
22	19	(Germany) Jochen Mass	Surtees-Ford	1:28.119	+3.361	22
23	16	(Sweden) Bertil Roos	Shadow-Ford	1:28.298	+3.540	23
24	18	(Brazil) Carlos Pace	Surtees-Ford	1:28.574	+3.816	24
25	20	(United Kingdom) Richard Robarts	Iso-Marlboro-Ford	1:28.930	+4.172	DNS
26	23	(Finland) Leo Kinnunen	Surtees-Ford	1:29.387	+4.629	25
DNQ	22	(Australia) Vern Schuppan	Ensign-Ford	1:29.480	+4.722	26^{1}
DNQ	20	(Italy) Arturo Merzario	Iso-Marlboro-Ford	1:53.677	+28.919	DNS

- ^1 – Schuppan failed to qualify, but took the start of the race illegally.

=== Race ===
Pos	No	Driver	Constructor	Laps	Time/Retired	Grid	Points
1	3	(South Africa) Jody Scheckter	Tyrrell-Ford	80	1:58:31.391	2	9
2	4	(France) Patrick Depailler	Tyrrell-Ford	80	+0.380	1	6
3	24	(United Kingdom) James Hunt	Hesketh-Ford	80	+3.325	6	4
4	5	(Brazil) Emerson Fittipaldi	McLaren-Ford	80	+53.507	9	3
5	17	(France) Jean-Pierre Jarier	Shadow-Ford	80	+1:16.403	8	2
6	26	(United Kingdom) Graham Hill	Lola-Ford	79	+1 lap	15	1
7	27	(United Kingdom) Guy Edwards	Lola-Ford	79	+1 lap	18	
8	21	(Denmark) Tom Belsø	Iso-Marlboro-Ford	79	+1 lap	21	
9	8	(Liechtenstein) Rikky von Opel	Brabham-Ford	79	+1 lap	20	
10	10	(Italy) Vittorio Brambilla	March-Ford	78	Engine	17	
11	28	(United Kingdom) John Watson	Brabham-Ford	77	+3 laps	14	
DSQ	22	(Australia) Vern Schuppan	Ensign-Ford	77	Started illegally	26	
Ret	12	(Austria) Niki Lauda	Ferrari	70	Gearbox	3	
Ret	9	(Sweden) Reine Wisell	March-Ford	59	Suspension	16	
Ret	6	(New Zealand) Denny Hulme	McLaren-Ford	56	Suspension	12	
Ret	19	(Germany) Jochen Mass	Surtees-Ford	53	Suspension	22	
Ret	7	(Argentina) Carlos Reutemann	Brabham-Ford	30	Oil leak	10	
Ret	2	(Belgium) Jacky Ickx	Lotus-Ford	27	Engine	7	
Ret	11	(Switzerland) Clay Regazzoni	Ferrari	24	Gearbox	4	
Ret	18	(Brazil) Carlos Pace	Surtees-Ford	15	Handling	24	
Ret	1	(Sweden) Ronnie Peterson	Lotus-Ford	8	Halfshaft	5	
Ret	23	(Finland) Leo Kinnunen	Surtees-Ford	8	Engine	25	
Ret	33	(United Kingdom) Mike Hailwood	McLaren-Ford	5	Fuel leak	11	
Ret	14	(France) Jean-Pierre Beltoise	BRM	3	Engine	13	
Ret	16	(Sweden) Bertil Roos	Shadow-Ford	2	Gearbox	23	
Ret	15	(France) Henri Pescarolo	BRM	0	Fire	19	
DNS	20	(United Kingdom) Richard Robarts	Iso-Marlboro-Ford		Car raced by Belsø		
DNS	20	(Italy) Arturo Merzario	Iso-Marlboro-Ford		Driver injured		

== Notes ==
- This was the Formula One World Championship debut for Swedish driver Bertil Roos.
- This race saw the first pole position and 10th fastest lap set by a French driver.
- This was the first Grand Prix win for a South African and African driver.
- This race marked the 5th Grand Prix start and first podium finish for British constructor Hesketh.
- This was the first Grand Prix start for a Finnish driver.

== Championship standings after the race ==
Drivers' Championship standings

Pos	Driver	Points
1	(Brazil) Emerson Fittipaldi	27
2	(Switzerland) Clay Regazzoni	22
3	(Austria) Niki Lauda	21
4	(South Africa) Jody Scheckter	21
5	(New Zealand) Denny Hulme	11

Constructors' Championship standings

Pos	Constructor	Points
1	(United Kingdom) McLaren-Ford	40
2	(Italy) Ferrari	30
3	(United Kingdom) Tyrrell-Ford	25
4	(United Kingdom) Lotus-Ford	13
5	(United Kingdom) Brabham-Ford	10

- Note: Only the top five positions are included for both sets of standings.

Previous race: 1974 Monaco Grand Prix	FIA Formula One World Championship; 1974 season	Next race: 1974 Dutch Grand Prix
Previous race: 1973 Swedish Grand Prix	Swedish Grand Prix	Next race: 1975 Swedish Grand Prix
