= Henry Nielsen =

Henry Nielsen may refer to:

- Henry Nielsen (actor) (1890–1967), Danish stage and film actor
- Henry Nielsen (athlete) (1910–1969), Danish middle- and long-distance runner
- Henry Nielsen (footballer)
