= Jakob Nielsen =

Jacob or Jakob Nielsen may refer to:

- Jacob Nielsen, Count of Halland (died c. 1309), great grandson of Valdemar II of Denmark
- Jacob Nielsen (businessman), Norway (1768-1822)
- Jakob Nielsen (mathematician) (1890–1959), Danish mathematician known for work on automorphisms of surfaces
- Jakob Nielsen (usability consultant) (born 1957), Danish web usability consultant
- Jakob Axel Nielsen (born 1967), Danish lawyer and politician
- Jakob Nielsen (actor) (1900-1978)
- Jacob Nielsen (cyclist) (born 1978), Danish cyclist
- Jakob Ahlmann Nielsen (born 1991), Danish footballer
