= Niels Åge Nielsen =

- Born: 25 June 1913
- Died: 16 January 1986 (aged 72)
- Occupation: Philologist
- Employer: Aarhus University
- Political party: Communist Party of Denmark

Niels Aage Anton Nielsen (Note: Around 1948 he changed his name from Aage to Åge.) (born in Vejle 25 June 1913, died 16 January 1986) was a Danish professor of Nordic languages at Aarhus University. He was also a leader in the Danish resistance movement.

== Life and career ==
Nielsen was the son of master carpenter Niels Nielsen (1883-1962) and his wife Ella Kirstine Rasmussen (maiden name) (1892-1979).

He took his high school diploma at Marselisborg Gymnasium in 1933, and in 1942 he obtained a master's degree in arts from Aarhus University. Later, he held various teaching positions at the same university, until he became a professor of Nordic languages at Odense University in 1966. However, he returned to his former university in 1972.

He mostly devoted his attention to studying Danish dialects, especially the different dialects in Jutland and the history of the Danish language.

Niels Aage Nielsen was also a high-ranking communist member of the Danish resistance movement during the German occupation of Denmark.

== Publications ==
- De jyske dialekter (The Dialects of Jutland). Copenhagen: Gyldendal 1959.
- Dansk etymologisk ordbog (Etymological Dictionary of Danish). Copenhagen: Gyldendal 1966, 6th edition 2010.
- Runestudier (Rune Studies). Odense: Odense Universitetsforlag 1968.
- Sprogets opståen og udvikling (The Origin and Development of the Language).(Søndagsuniversitetet 88). Copenhagen: Munksgaard 1968.
- Runerne på Rökstenen (The runic Letters on Rökstenen). Odense: Odense Universitetsforlag 1969.
- Dansk dialektantologi (Danish Dialect Anthology). Volume 1: Østdansk og ømål. Volume 2: Jysk. Copenhagen: Hernov 1978–80.
- Mellem jyske modstandsfolk 1941–1945 (Between Jutlandic Members of the Resistance Movement). Copenhagen: Zac 1980.
- Sprogrenseren H.C. Ørsted (The Language Cleaner Hans Christian Ørsted). Volume 1–2. Aarhus: Nordisk Institut, Aarhus University 1981.
- 50 danske runeindskrifter (50 Danish runic Inscriptions). Aarhus: Nordisk Institut, Aarhus University 1981.
- Syntaksen i Holbergs epistler (The Syntax in the Epistles of Holberg). Aarhus: Nordisk Institut, Aarhus University 1983.
- Danske runeindskrifter: et udvalg med kommentarer (Danish runic Inscriptions: A Selection with Comments). Copenhagen: Hernov 1983.
- Norske indslag i nydansk (Nordic Features in modern Danish). Volume 1: Dansk over for norsk sprog ca. 1700–1950. Volume 2: Liste over låneord fra norsk ca. 1700–1950. Aarhus: Nordisk Institut, Aarhus University 1983–84.
- Fra runesprog til nudansk: studier og kommenterede tekster (From runic Language to modern Danish: Studies and commented Texts). Aarhus: Nordisk Institut, Aarhus University 1984.
- (in collaboration with Hallfrid Christiansen) Norsk-dansk ordbog (Norwegian-Danish Dictionary). Gyldendal 1971.
- (in collaboration with Sven Brüel) Gyldendals fremmedordbog (Gyldendals Dictionary of foreign Words). Copenhagen: Gyldendal, 9th edition 1983.

== See also ==
Danish resistance movement on Wikipedia
