= James Neilson (footballer) =

Scottish footballer (1887–1917)

Personal information
- Full name: James Hadden Neilson
- Date of birth: 7 November 1887
- Place of birth: Montrose, Scotland
- Date of death: 28 October 1917 (aged 29)
- Place of death: Salonika, Kingdom of Greece
- Position: Forward

Senior career*
Years	Team	Apps	(Gls)
- Ellon United
–1909	Huntly		
1909–1914	Aberdeen	1	(0)
- * Club domestic league appearances and goals

James Hadden Neilson (7 November 1887 – 28 October 1917) was a Scottish professional footballer who played as a forward in the Scottish League for Aberdeen.

== Personal life ==
Neilson served in the Lovat Scouts and the Queen's Own Cameron Highlanders during the First World War. He was holding the rank of sergeant when he was killed in Greece during the Salonika Campaign on 28 October 1917. He was buried in Kirechkoi-Hortakoi Military Cemetery, near Exochi. His brothers Rolland and Charles (the latter also a footballer) were also killed during the war.

== Career statistics ==
Appearances and goals by club, season and competition
Club	Season	League			Scottish Cup		Other		Total	
Club	Season	Division	Apps	Goals	Apps	Goals	Apps	Goals	Apps	Goals
Aberdeen	1908–09	Scottish First Division	0	0	0	0	1 (Note: Appearance in Fleming Charity Shield)	0	1	0
Aberdeen	1911–12	Scottish First Division	1	0	0	0	0	0	1	0
Career total			1	0	0	0	1	0	2	0

== Honours ==
Aberdeen

- Fleming Charity Shield: 1908–09
