= John Neilson (footballer, born 1921) =

Scottish footballer

Personal information
- Full name: John Crane Neilson
- Date of birth: 2 August 1921
- Place of birth: Hamilton, Scotland
- Date of death: 24 March 1988
- Place of death: Surrey, England
- Position: Inside forward

Senior career*
Years	Team	Apps	(Gls)
- Aberdeen
- Arbroath
- Ballymena United
	Clyde	1	(0)
1947–1948	Bradford City	29	(11)
- Wrexham
- Stonehouse Violet
	Queen of the South	44	(6)
- Crusaders
1951	Macclesfield Town	18	(8)
- * Club domestic league appearances and goals

John Crane Neilson (2 August 1921 – 24 March 1988) was a Scottish professional footballer. He was a centre forward.

Neilson played for Clyde, Bradford City, where he was the club's top goal-scorer in 1947–48 before he left after just five games the following season, and Wrexham.
