= Tom Belsø =

Danish racing driver (1942–2020)

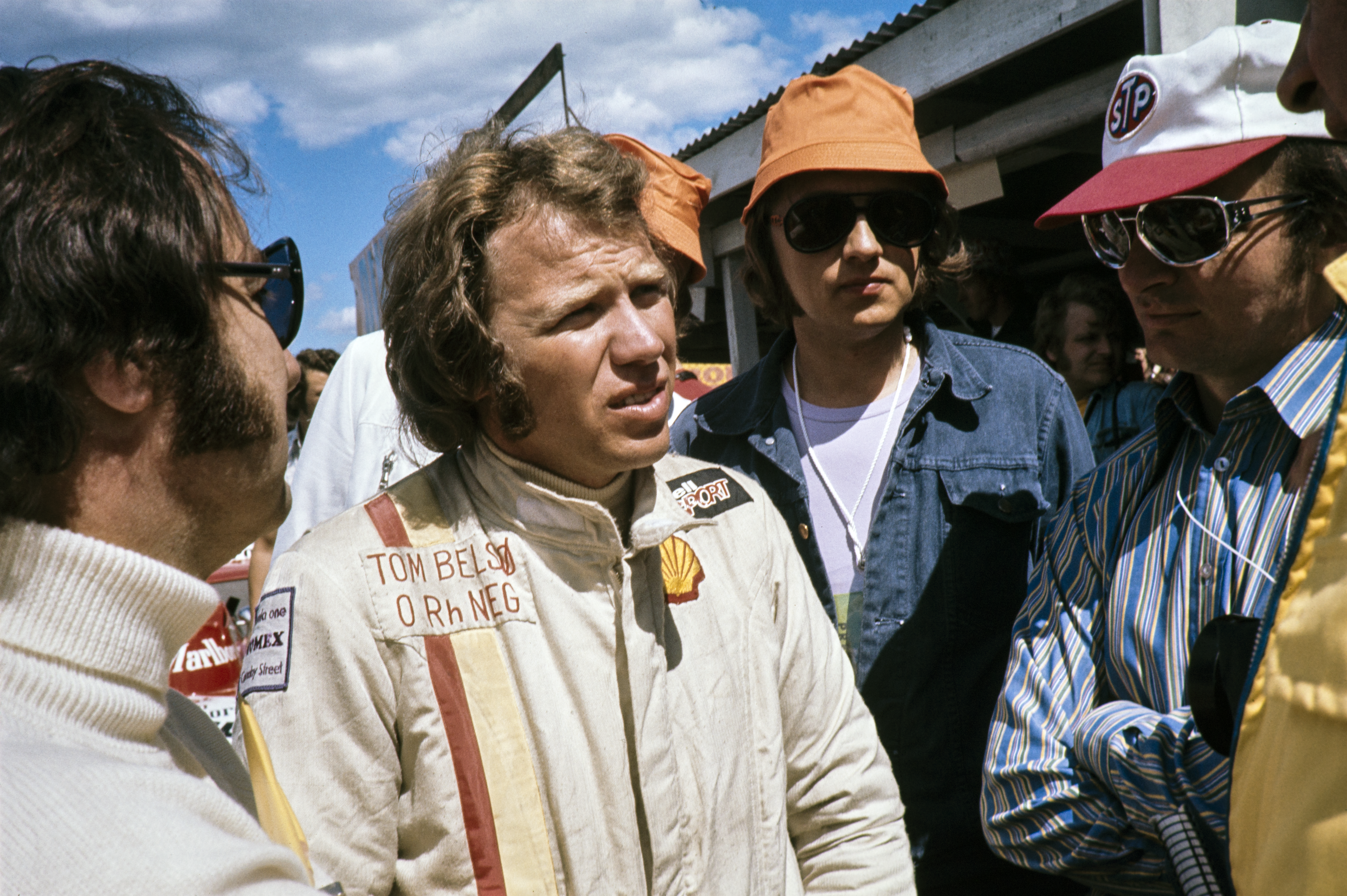
- Born: 27 August 1942; Gladsaxe, Denmark
- Died: 12 January 2020 (aged 77); Rushden, United Kingdom

Formula One World Championship career
- Nationality: (Denmark) Danish
- Active years: 1973–1974
- Team: Frank Williams Racing Cars
- Entries: 5 (2 starts)
- Championships: 0
- Wins: 0
- Podiums: 0
- Career points: 0
- Pole positions: 0
- Fastest laps: 0
- First entry: 1973 Swedish Grand Prix
- Last entry: 1974 British Grand Prix

Tom Belsø (27 August 1942 – 12 January 2020) was a motor racing driver, credited as the first Formula One driver from Denmark.

== Early career ==
Belsø started out in touring cars, where he won his debut race and went on to become Scandinavian Touring Car Champion in 1969. He became a Formula Two racer in 1972, with his best result being a fourth place at the Albi Grand Prix, finishing 17th in the European F2 Championship. In 1973, he raced a Lola in Formula 5000. He also raced in a few non-championship Formula One races, finishing seventh in the 1973 Race of Champions and eighth in the 1973 BRDC International Trophy, and retiring in the 1974 BRDC International Trophy and 1975 Race of Champions. He contested the 1974 Rothmans 5000 European Championship winning at Snetterton and finishing eighth in the Series. He also competed in the 1977 Shellsport 5000/Libre series and finished fifth in a Radio Luxemburg-sponsored Lola T330-Chevrolet.

== Formula One ==
Belsø qualified a Formula One Iso-Marlboro for the Frank Williams Racing Cars team at the 1973 Swedish Grand Prix, but could not start the race because his sponsorship money did not arrive. In 1974, he tried four times to qualify for Williams, but was only successful in South Africa and Sweden. In South Africa, the clutch on Belsø's FW failed on the first lap of the race. In Sweden, he finished his only complete Grand Prix, in eighth place.

== Racing record ==
=== Complete Formula One results ===
(key)

Year	Entrant	Chassis	Engine	1	2	3	4	5	6	7	8	9	10	11	12	13	14	15	WDC	Points
1973	Frank Williams Racing Cars	Iso-Marlboro IR	Cosworth V8	ARG	BRA	RSA	ESP	BEL	MON	SWE; DNS‡	FRA	GBR	NED	GER	AUT	ITA	CAN	USA	NC	0
1974	Frank Williams Racing Cars	Iso-Marlboro FW	Cosworth V8	ARG	BRA	RSA; Ret	ESP; DNQ	BEL	MON	SWE; 8	NED	FRA	GBR; DNQ	GER	AUT	ITA	CAN	USA	NC	0

‡ Belsø took part in practice only. The car was driven in the race by Howden Ganley.

=== Complete British Saloon Car Championship results ===
(key) (Races in bold indicate pole position; races in italics indicate fastest lap.)

Year	Team	Car	Class	1	2	3	4	5	6	7	8	9	10	11	12	Pos.	Pts	Class
1969	Tom Belsø	Ford Escort TC	C	BRH	SIL	SNE	THR	SIL ovr:5 cls:2	CRY	MAL	CRO	SIL	OUL	BRH	BRH	26th	6	7th
1970	British Vita Racing	Ford Escort TC	C	BRH	SNE	THR	SIL	CRY	SIL	SIL	CRO	BRH	OUL	BRH	BRH ovr:14 cls:7	NC	0	NC

== Personal life ==
In 1977 he founded Belso Cereals, a food manufacturing company based in Peterborough.

On 12 January 2020, Belsø died from stomach cancer; he was 77 years old.
