= Hans Bruun Nielsen =

Danish mathematician (1943–2015)

Hans Bruun Nielsen (1943 – 2015) was a Danish mathematician and Associate Professor of Technical University of Denmark specializing in Numerical analysis and the application of numerical methods.

== Book ==
- Eldén, Wittmeyer-Koch, Nielsen Introduction to Numerical Computation - analysis and MATLAB illustrations, 2004 Studentlitteratur, ISBN 91-44-03727-9
  - The book's Contents page
  - Formulae from the book (E.g. order of Cholesky decomposition computations, maximum error in Chebyshev interpolation, and maximum stable step length using Runge-Kutta.)
