= Neilson =

Neilson may refer to:

== Places ==
- Zec Batiscan-Neilson, in the Portneuf Regional County Municipality, Quebec, Canada
- Neilson Township, in Portneuf Regional County Municipality, Quebec, Canada
- Neilson River (Bras du Nord), Saint-Raymond, Portneuf Regional County Municipality, Quebec, Canada

== Business ==
- Neilson Dairy, or William Neilson Dairy Limited, a Canadian dairy company
- Neilson and Company, 19th century locomotive manufacturer in Glasgow, Scotland

== Other uses ==
- Neilson (name), people with the given name or surname
- Roger Neilson Memorial Award, annual award for the top academic College/University player in the Ontario Hockey League

== See also ==
- Nielsen (disambiguation)
- Neilston, a village and parish in East Renfrewshire in the west central Lowlands of Scotland
