= Brendan Neilson =

New Zealand rugby player (born 1978)

- Born: Brendan Neilson; 5 April 1978 (age 48) Auckland, New Zealand
- Height: 1.80 m (5 ft 11 in)
- Weight: 90 kg (14 st 2 lb)
- School: Sendai Ikuei High School
- University: Ryutsu Keizai University
- Occupation(s): IBDP World History Instructor & Rugby Head Coach

Rugby union career
- Position: centre
Senior career
Years	Team	Apps	(Points)
2000–2003	NEC Green Rockets		
2004–2009	Coca-Cola West Red Sparks		
2010–2015	Kamaishi Seawaves		
International career
Years	Team	Apps	(Points)
- Japan A

Brendan Neilson (born 5 April 1978) is a New Zealand-Japanese former rugby union player who played as a Centre in Japan for Coca-Cola Red Sparks, NEC Green Rockets and Kamaishi Seawaves. He studied in Japan at Sendai Ikuei High School, then Ryutsu Keizai University. On graduation he first joined NEC Green Rockets. He has a bachelor's degree in tourism and social studies.

In 2006, he obtained Japanese citizenship, though at international level he has yet to represent the senior Japan squad, having played for the Japan A and Under-23 sides.

In April 2015, he began working as IBDP World History Instructor & Rugby Head Coach at Sendai Ikuei High School and is still currently there.
