= Benny Nielsen =

Benny Nielsen may refer to:

- Benny Nielsen (swimmer) (born 1966), Danish swimmer
- Benny Nielsen (boxer) (1934–1994), Danish boxer
- Benny Nielsen (footballer, born 17 March 1951), Danish football player
- Benny Nielsen (footballer, born 7 March 1951), Danish football player
