= Skylar Nielsen =

American film director

- Born: 1975 (age 50–51); Salt Lake City, Utah, USA
- Occupations: Director, cinematographer
- Known for: Vita Brevis Films

Skylar Nielsen (born 1975), is an American photographer, cinematographer and director. He heads Salt Lake City-based Vita Brevis Films, a company that creates short documentary films on a wide variety of subjects.

Nielsen was born in Zion, Utah, in 1975. He grew up on his family's farm, and after "an epiphany in the sheep corral" decided to move away from the farm and into the city to pursue photography and film making in 1993.

In 2004, Nielsen established Skylar Nielsen Studio, then in 2008 established Vita Brevis Films.

== Selected film projects ==
- Quick Cuts: Reef Mcintosh
- The Prohibition Tour
- Professional: Eric Arakawa
- We are 138
- Professional
- BMW M6
- Riot Racing
- Super Bee
- Fiz Golf
- 3D Enchanted Forest
- 3 Form Woven Wall
- Gray Davenport

== Larger projects ==
NEA PSAs

In 2009, the National Endowment for the Arts commissioned Nielsen for two commercials to air during Oscar week. The first commercial featured Chris Botti, a renowned jazz trumpeter. The second commercial, called "I'm Proud", featured actors and actresses delivering lines directly to the audience without a fourth wall present. Celebrities included David Hyde Pierce, Kerry Washington, Zooey Deschanel and Alyssa Milano, among many others.

PROFESSIONal

In 2011, Nielsen partnered with VideoWest to create PROFESSIONal, the first in a series of films that focus on "forgotten trades and practices in an evolving America." The short documentary focused on Neil Youngberg, a third generation metal worker and fabricator from Utah.

The video, a Vimeo Staff Pick, had Nielsen directing, cinematography by Ian Rigby and Lance Clayton and sound by Michael Hall.

PROFESSIONal was reviewed as "a gorgeous short film" and "beautifully crafted". The film won the 2011 Slamdance Film Festival's best short-form documentary award and was also featured at LA Short Fest.

Mars One Way

In February 2014, Nielsen directed a documentary video called Mars One Way, a film that followed five Mars One hopefuls with their thoughts, contemplations and theories on leaving Earth forever to go colonize Mars. The video was produced by Nielsen, along with Elaine Clark and Doug Fabrizio.

Mars One Way was a Vimeo Staff Pick and featured on their site, being listed as appropriate for all audiences. Music included on the film was from artists God is an Astronaut with two songs and This Will Destroy You with one. Yahoo featured the video on their site as well.

The film was filmed in 720p and lasts 11 min 40 sec.
