= Richard Nielsen =

Richard Nielsen may refer to:

- Richard Møller Nielsen (1937–2014), Danish football player and manager
- Richard P. Nielsen (born 1946), professor at Boston College and a past president of the Society for Business Ethics
- Rick Nielsen (Richard Alan Nielsen, born 1948), lead guitarist, backing vocalist, and primary songwriter of the rock band Cheap Trick
