= Eigil Nielsen =

Eigil Nielsen may refer to:

- Eigil Nielsen (paleontologist) (1910–1968), Danish paleontologist
- Eigil Nielsen (footballer, born 1918) (1918–2000), Danish amateur football goalkeeper
- Eigil Nielsen (footballer, born 1948) (1948–2019), Danish football midfielder
