= 1973 Swedish Grand Prix =

Race details
- Date: 17 June 1973
- Official name: IV Hitachi Grand Prix of Sweden
- Location: Scandinavian Raceway, Anderstorp, Sweden
- Course: Permanent racing facility
- Course length: 4.018 km (2.497 miles)
- Distance: 80 laps, 321.440 km (199.734 miles)

Pole position
| Driver | (Sweden) Ronnie Peterson | Lotus-Ford |
- Time: 1:23.810

Fastest lap
| Driver | (New Zealand) Denny Hulme | McLaren-Ford |
- Time: 1:26.146 on lap 7

Podium
| First | (New Zealand) Denny Hulme | McLaren-Ford |
| Second | (Sweden) Ronnie Peterson | Lotus-Ford |
| Third | (France) François Cevert | Tyrrell-Ford |

The 1973 Grand Prix of Sweden was a Formula One motor race held at the Scandinavian Raceway, Anderstorp on 17 June 1973. It was race 7 of 15 in both the 1973 World Championship of Drivers and the 1973 International Cup for Formula One Manufacturers. The 80-lap race was won by McLaren driver Denny Hulme after he started from sixth position. Ronnie Peterson finished second for the Lotus team and Tyrrell driver François Cevert came in third.

Ronnie Peterson's success with John Player Team Lotus was the catalyst for a Swedish Grand Prix and the race was held for the first time, at World Championship level, at the grandly-named Scandinavian Raceway in 1973.

== Background ==
=== Entry ===
A total of 29 F1 cars were entered for this event, however only 22 arrived for the race. The field was smaller than usual as there was no time for teams to repair damaged cars after the Monaco, as they had to be transported 1,200 miles from Monaco to Anderstorp.

A number of drivers were missing from action; Arturo Merzario (Scuderia Ferrari), Chris Amon (Martini Racing Team Tecno), Andrea de Adamich (Ceramica Pagnossin Brabham)., David Purley (LEC Refrigeration Racing March) and James Hunt (Hesketh Racing March). Meanwhile, Nanni Galli had decided to retire, so Frank Williams Racing Cars entered Danish driver, Tom Belsø, however it became clear that there was no funding available from his sponsors for the race. Swedish driver, Reine Wisell had rented LEC's March 731.

== Qualifying ==
Ronnie Peterson did not disappoint his fans in qualifying, taking pole in his Lotus 72E from Tyrrell's François Cevert. Cevert came close to taking pole, but Peterson took it by just 0.089 of a second. The World Championship contenders shared the second row, with Jackie Stewart ahead of Emerson Fittipaldi, while Carlos Reutemann and Denny Hulme made the third row.

=== Qualifying classification ===
| Pos | No | Driver | Team | Time |
|---|---|---|---|---|
| 1 | 2 | (Sweden) Ronnie Peterson | Lotus-Ford | 1:23.810 |
| 2 | 6 | (France) François Cevert | Tyrrell-Ford | 1:23.899 |
| 3 | 5 | (United Kingdom) Jackie Stewart | Tyrrell-Ford | 1:23.912 |
| 4 | 1 | (Brazil) Emerson Fittipaldi | Lotus-Ford | 1:24.084 |
| 5 | 10 | (Argentina) Carlos Reutemann | Brabham-Ford | 1:24.489 |
| 6 | 7 | (New Zealand) Denny Hulme | McLaren-Ford | 1:24.625 |
| 7 | 8 | (United States) Peter Revson | McLaren-Ford | 1:24.937 |
| 8 | 3 | (Belgium) Jacky Ickx | Ferrari | 1:25.604 |
| 9 | 20 | (France) Jean-Pierre Beltoise | BRM | 1:25.738 |
| 10 | 23 | (United Kingdom) Mike Hailwood | Surtees-Ford | 1:25.776 |
| 11 | 25 | (New Zealand) Howden Ganley | Iso-Marlboro-Ford | 1:25.800 |
| 12 | 19 | (Switzerland) Clay Regazzoni | BRM | 1:25.995 |
| 13 | 11 | (Brazil) Wilson Fittipaldi | Brabham-Ford | 1:26.127 |
| 14 | 27 | (Sweden) Reine Wisell | March-Ford | 1:26.187 |
| 15 | 21 | (Austria) Niki Lauda | BRM | 1:26.211 |
| 16 | 24 | (Brazil) Carlos Pace | Surtees-Ford | 1:26.255 |
| 17 | 17 | (United Kingdom) Jackie Oliver | Shadow-Ford | 1:26.305 |
| 18 | 12 | (United Kingdom) Graham Hill | Shadow-Ford | 1:26.382 |
| 19 | 16 | (United States) George Follmer | Shadow-Ford | 1:26.632 |
| 20 | 14 | (France) Jean-Pierre Jarier | March-Ford | 1:26.874 |
| 21 | 15 | (United Kingdom) Mike Beuttler | March-Ford | 1:28.580 |
| 22 | 26 | (Denmark) Tom Belsø | Iso-Marlboro-Ford | 1:28.972 |

== Race ==
The race was held over 80 laps of the Scandinavian Raceway circuit, in front of a crowd of over 50,000 spectators. There was a delayed start caused by the Grand Prix Drivers' Association complaining about photographers in dangerous places around the circuit.

Emerson Fittipaldi made the best start and grabbed second behind local hero, Ronnie Peterson. The Tyrrell 006 of François Cevert was third with teammate Jackie Stewart behind him. Carlos Reutemann and Denny Hulme completed the top six, although by lap four, the McLaren of Hulme had moved ahead of the Brabham. The order remained stable until Stewart passed Cevert and began to chase the two JPS Lotuses. By this time, Cevert was having trouble with his tyres and dropped back and was overtaken by Hulme on lap 62. Hulme then started close in on Stewart.

For 70 laps it looked like this was going to be a one-two for John Player Team Lotus with Peterson first and reigning World Champion, Fittipaldi second. However disaster struck when Fittipaldi retired with gearbox failure. With just three laps to go, Hulme overtook Stewart, when the Scot suffered a rear brake failure. Hulme quickly closed the gap on the leader, Peterson having major trouble with tyre wear and fighting to stay on the track.

On the 79th and penultimate lap Hulme was able to pass the local hero to snatch victory, the New Zealander's decision to run harder tyres on his McLaren-Cosworth M23 having paid off. Peterson was powerless to defend and eventually finished four seconds adrift in second place, that was as close as any Swede came to winning on home soil. Hulme expressed sadness to "have taken that away from Ronnie." Cevert was a further 10.6 seconds behind Peterson.

=== Race classification ===
| Pos | No | Driver | Constructor | Laps | Time/Retired | Grid | Points |
|---|---|---|---|---|---|---|---|
| 1 | 7 | (New Zealand) Denny Hulme | McLaren-Ford | 80 | 1:56:46.049 | 6 | 9 |
| 2 | 2 | (Sweden) Ronnie Peterson | Lotus-Ford | 80 | + 4.039 | 1 | 6 |
| 3 | 6 | (France) François Cevert | Tyrrell-Ford | 80 | + 14.667 | 2 | 4 |
| 4 | 10 | (Argentina) Carlos Reutemann | Brabham-Ford | 80 | + 18.068 | 5 | 3 |
| 5 | 5 | (United Kingdom) Jackie Stewart | Tyrrell-Ford | 80 | + 25.998 | 3 | 2 |
| 6 | 3 | (Belgium) Jacky Ickx | Ferrari | 79 | + 1 Lap | 8 | 1 |
| 7 | 8 | (United States) Peter Revson | McLaren-Ford | 79 | + 1 Lap | 7 | |
| 8 | 15 | (United Kingdom) Mike Beuttler | March-Ford | 78 | + 2 Laps | 21 | |
| 9 | 19 | (Switzerland) Clay Regazzoni | BRM | 77 | + 3 Laps | 12 | |
| 10 | 24 | (Brazil) Carlos Pace | Surtees-Ford | 77 | + 3 Laps | 16 | |
| 11 | 25 | (New Zealand) Howden Ganley | Iso-Marlboro-Ford | 77 | + 3 Laps | 11 | |
| 12 | 1 | (Brazil) Emerson Fittipaldi | Lotus-Ford | 76 | Gearbox | 4 | |
| 13 | 21 | (Austria) Niki Lauda | BRM | 75 | + 5 Laps | 15 | |
| 14 | 16 | (United States) George Follmer | Shadow-Ford | 74 | + 6 Laps | 19 | |
| Ret | 20 | (France) Jean-Pierre Beltoise | BRM | 57 | Engine | 9 | |
| Ret | 17 | (United Kingdom) Jackie Oliver | Shadow-Ford | 50 | Suspension | 17 | |
| Ret | 23 | (United Kingdom) Mike Hailwood | Surtees-Ford | 41 | Tyre | 10 | |
| Ret | 14 | (France) Jean-Pierre Jarier | March-Ford | 38 | Throttle | 20 | |
| Ret | 12 | (United Kingdom) Graham Hill | Shadow-Ford | 16 | Ignition | 18 | |
| Ret | 11 | (Brazil) Wilson Fittipaldi | Brabham-Ford | 0 | Accident | 12 | |
| DNS | 27 | (Sweden) Reine Wisell | March-Ford | | Suspension | 14 | |
| DNS | 26 | (Denmark) Tom Belsø | Iso-Marlboro-Ford | | Car Raced by Ganley | 22 | |

== Notes ==
- This was the Formula One World Championship debut for Danish driver Tom Belsø. He was the first Danish driver in Formula One.
- This was the 5th pole position and the 10th podium finish for a Swedish driver.
- This race marked the 50th fastest lap set by a Ford-powered car.

== Championship standings after the race ==
Drivers' Championship standings

| | Pos | Driver | Points |
|---|---|---|---|
| | 1 | (Brazil) Emerson Fittipaldi | 41 |
| | 2 | (United Kingdom) Jackie Stewart | 39 |
| | 3 | (France) François Cevert | 25 |
| 1 | 4 | (New Zealand) Denny Hulme | 19 |
| 1 | 5 | (United States) Peter Revson | 11 |

Constructors' Championship standings

| | Pos | Constructor | Points |
|---|---|---|---|
| | 1 | (United Kingdom) Tyrrell-Ford | 49 |
| | 2 | (United Kingdom) Lotus-Ford | 47 |
| | 3 | (United Kingdom) McLaren-Ford | 26 |
| | 4 | (Italy) Ferrari | 10 |
| 2 | 5 | (United Kingdom) Brabham-Ford | 7 |

- Note: Only the top five positions are included for both sets of standings.

| Previous race: 1973 Monaco Grand Prix | FIA Formula One World Championship; 1973 season | Next race: 1973 French Grand Prix |
| Previous race: 1967 Swedish Grand Prix | Swedish Grand Prix | Next race: 1974 Swedish Grand Prix |
