= Allan Nielsen (footballer, born 1976) =

Danish footballer

Personal information
- Date of birth: 26 June 1976 (age 50)
- Place of birth: Denmark
- Height: 1.86 m (6 ft 1 in)
- Position: Midfielder

Youth career
- Knudsker IF
- IK Viking Rønne

Senior career*
Years	Team	Apps	(Gls)
199?–2002	Hvidovre IF		
2002–2006	Køge BK		
2007	OB	4	(1)
2007–2008	Lyngby BK	9	(0)
2008–2009	Hvidovre IF		
2009–2010	Greve IF		
- * Club domestic league appearances and goals

Allan Nielsen (born 26 June 1976) is a Danish former professional football midfielder.

Nielsen moved in 2007 from Køge BK to the Danish Superliga side Odense Boldklub. As he only played four matches for them in six months, he moved to the promoted team, Lyngby BK. In the Autumn of 2007 he played 9 matches for Lyngby, but on 2 January 2008 Nielsen first cancelled his contract with Lyngby, and later the same day chose to end his career.
