= Wilhelm Nielsen (politician) =

Norwegian politician (1816–1889)

Wilhelm Nielsen (January 4, 1816 in Holmestrand – February 4, 1889 in Kragerø) was a Norwegian politician.

He was elected to the Norwegian Parliament in 1857. He was later elected in 1859 and 1862, representing the constituency of Holmestrand. He worked as a stipendiary magistrate (byfoged) there.
