= Anderstorp =

Locality in Gislaved, Jönköping County, Sweden

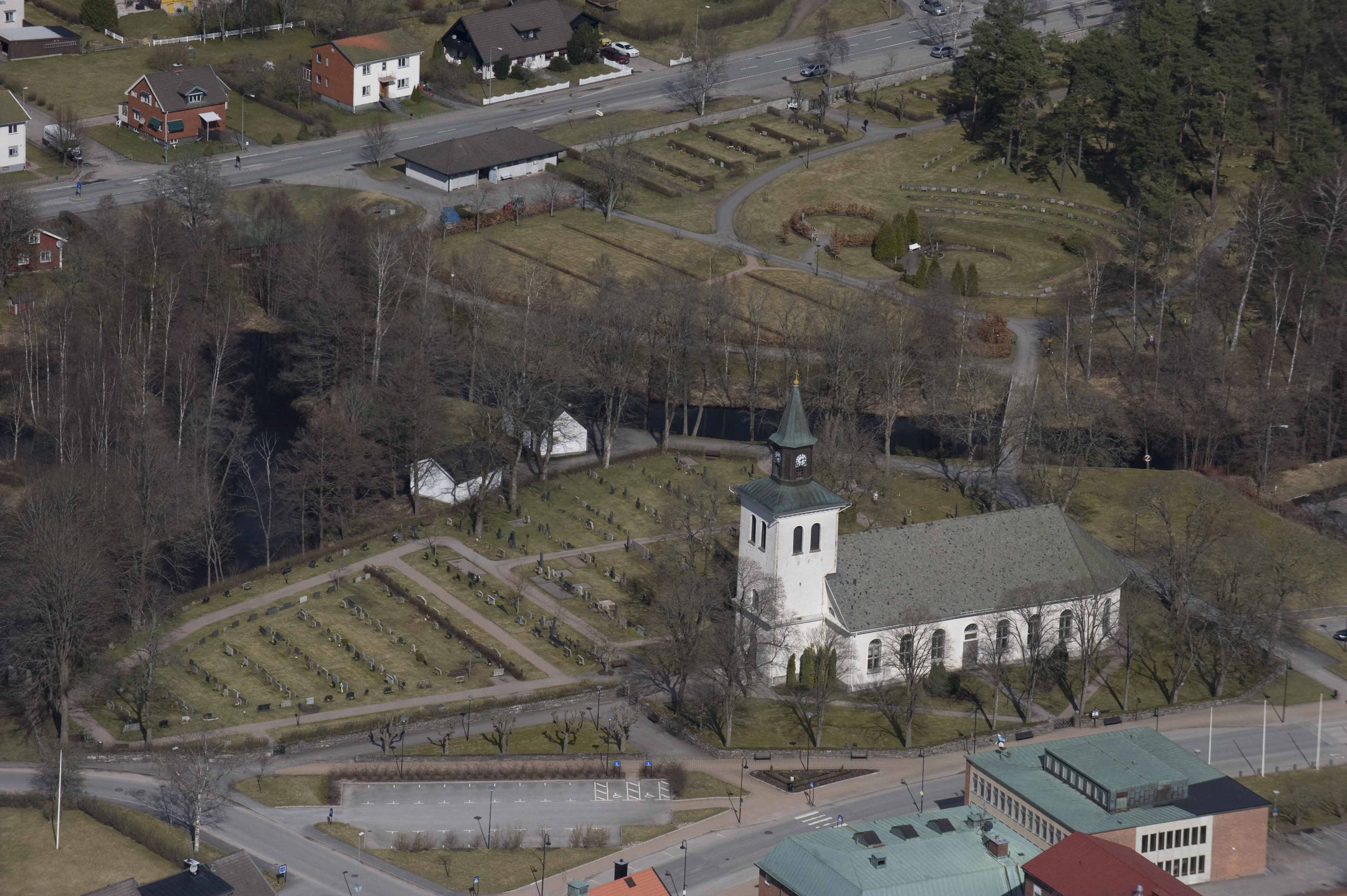
- April 2009 aerial photograph of Anderstorp Church.

- Location within Jönköping Location within Sweden
- Coordinates: 57°17′N 13°38′E
- Country: Sweden
- Province: Småland
- County: Jönköping County
- Municipality: Gislaved Municipality

Area
  - Total: 5.61 km^{2} (2.17 sq mi)

Population (31 December 2010)
  - Total: 4,965
  - Density: 884/km^{2} (2,290/sq mi)
- Time zone: UTC+1 (CET)
  - Summer (DST): UTC+2 (CEST)
- Climate: Dfb

Anderstorp (Swedish pronunciation: [ˈânːdɛʂˌtɔrp]) is a locality situated in Gislaved Municipality, Jönköping County, Sweden with 4,965 inhabitants in 2010.

The Scandinavian Raceway, which hosted the Swedish Grand Prix Formula One races from 1973 to 1978, is situated here.

Anderstorp also hosts the Anderstorps SK, famous for its men's handball teams, and has most industries in Sweden (per person).

== Notable residents ==
- Jonatan Nielsen (born 1993), Swedish ice hockey player
- Oliver Berntzon (born 1993), Swedish speedway rider
