= Nilsen =

Nilsen is a surname of Norwegian origin, meaning "son of Nils". Notable people with this name include:

- Adolf Nilsen (1895–1927), Norwegian Olympic rower
- Alfred Nilsen (1892–1977), Norwegian politician; served one term in the Storting 1950–54
- Alfred Sigurd Nilsen (1891–1977), Norwegian politician; served three terms in the Storting
- Anders Nilsen (disambiguation), several people
- Arne Nilsen (1924–2020), Norwegian government minister
- Achintya Holte Nilsen (born 1999) Indonesian-Norwegian model and activist
- B. J. Nilsen (born 1975), Swedish sound artist
- Betty Ann Bjerkreim Nilsen (born 1986), Norwegian orienteering competitor and cross-country skier
- Dennis Nilsen (1945–2018), British serial killer
- Einar Nilsen (1901–1980), Norwegian Olympic boxer
- Elin Nilsen (born 1968), Norwegian Olympic skier
- Erling Nilsen (1910–1984), Norwegian Olympic boxer
- Harald Christian Strand Nilsen (born 1971), Norwegian Olympic skier
- Ida Nilsen (contemporary), Canadian singer and songwriter
- Jeanette Nilsen (born 1972), Norwegian Olympic handball player
- Jimmy Nilsen (born 1966), Swedish motorcycle speedway rider
- Kristoffer Nilsen (1901–1975), Norwegian Olympic boxer
- Kurt Nilsen (born 1978), Norwegian pop/country singer
- Laila Schou Nilsen (1919–1998), Norwegian Olympic skater and skier
- Lars Arvid Nilsen (born 1965), Norwegian shot putter
- Lillebjørn Nilsen (born 1950), Norwegian singer, songwriter, and folk musician
- Nils Emaus Nilsen (1886–1976), Norwegian politician; Served one term in the Storting 1950–54
- Oddvard Nilsen (born 1940), Norwegian politician, served three terms in the Storting
- Olav Nilsen (1942–2021), Norwegian professional football player
- Ole-Jørgen Nilsen (1936–2008), Norwegian actor
- Oliver John Nilsen (1884–1977), Australian businessman and Lord Mayor of Melbourne
- Peder Nilsen (1846–1921), Norwegian government minister
- Phil Nilsen (born 1985), English rugby union football player
- Roger Nilsen (born 1969), Norwegian professional football player
- Rudolf Nilsen (1901–1929), Norwegian poet and journalist
- Rune Nilsen (1923–1998), Norwegian Olympic triple jumper
- Selmer Nilsen (1931–1991), Norwegian fisherman who spied for KGB during the Cold War
- Spencer Nilsen (born 1961), American video game music composer
- Steinar Nilsen (born 1972), Norwegian professional football player and manager
- Tom-Christer Nilsen (born 1969), Norwegian politician from Hordaland
- Torstein Aagaard-Nilsen (born 1964), Norwegian music composer
- Werner Nilsen (1904–1992), Norwegian-American soccer player
