= 1971 Formula One season =

25th season of the FIA's Formula One motor racing

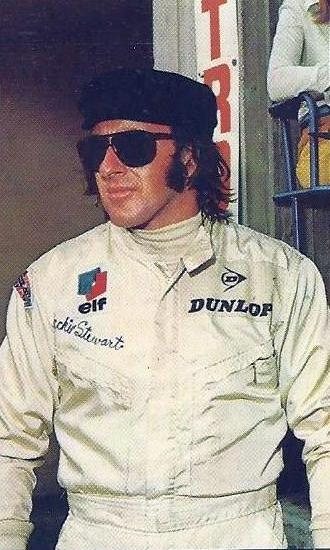
Jackie Stewart (pictured in 1969) won his second World Championship driving for Tyrrell-Ford.

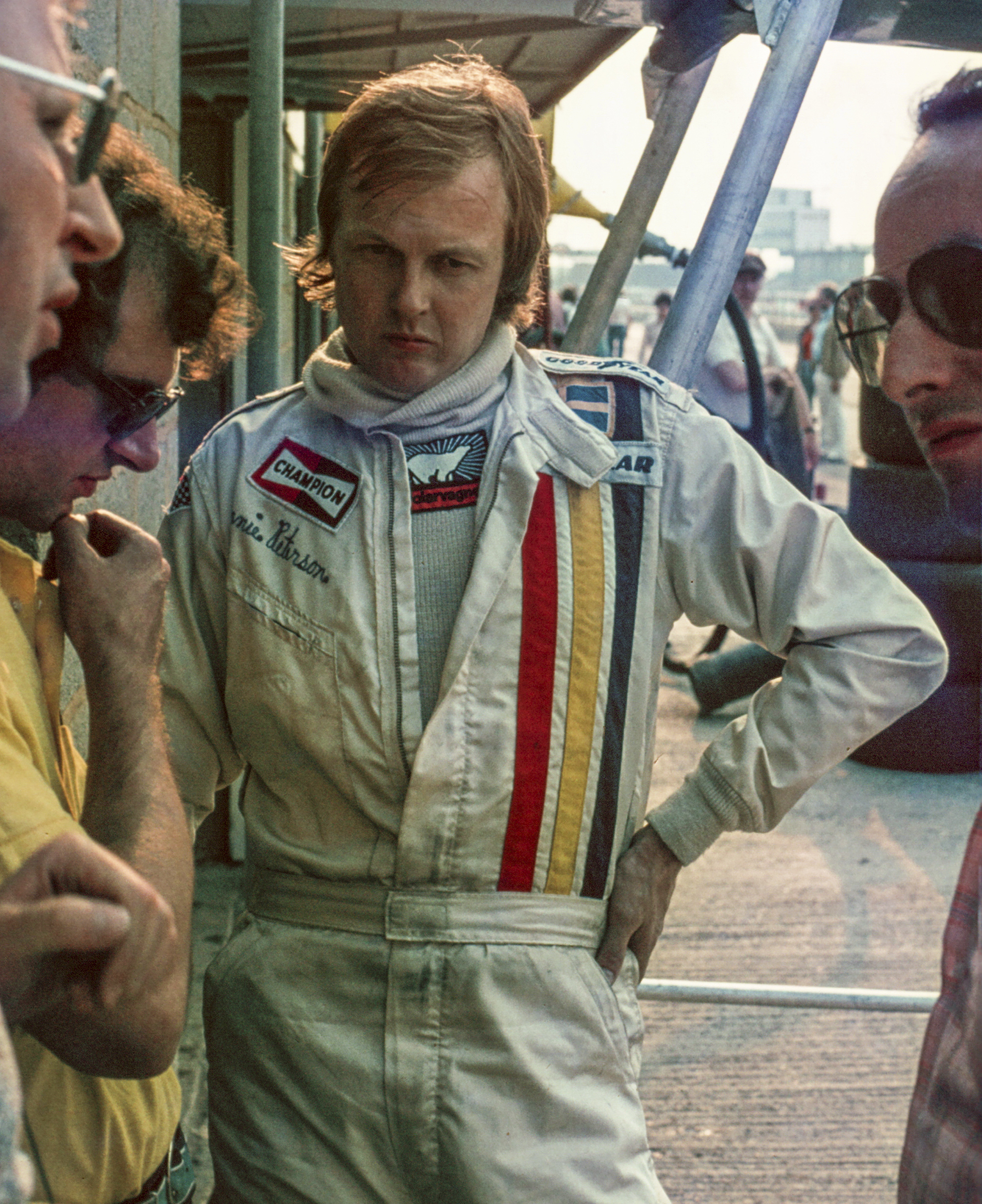
Ronnie Peterson (pictured in 1976) finished in second place driving for March.

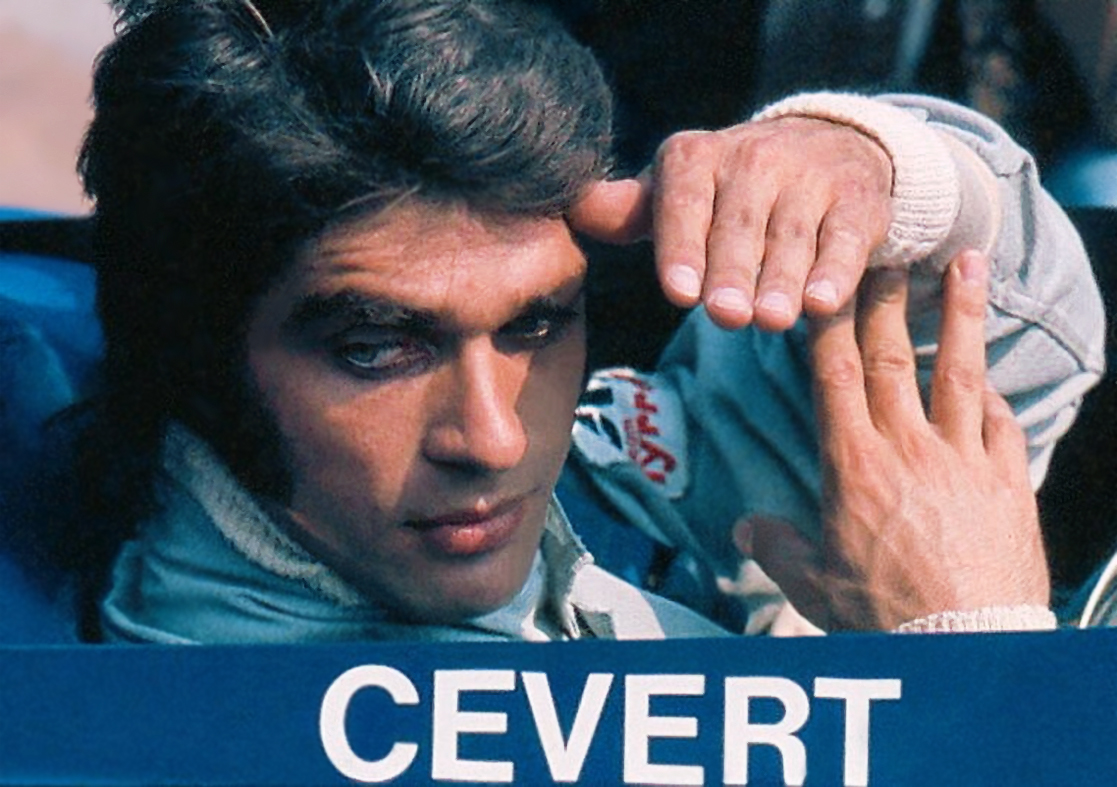
Stewart's teammate François Cevert finished the season ranked third.

The 1971 Formula One season was the 25th season of the Fédération Internationale de l'Automobile's Formula One motor racing. It featured the 22nd World Championship of Drivers, the 14th International Cup for F1 Manufacturers and a number of non-championship races open to Formula One cars. The World Championship was contested over eleven races between 6 March and 3 October.

Jackie Stewart had an outstanding year, winning his second Drivers' Championship by 29 points driving for Tyrrell Racing. Swede Ronnie Peterson finished a surprising second with March Engineering, the team having only been in its second season in Formula One. Stewart's teammate François Cevert, who took his only win at Watkins Glen that year, finished third, allowing Tyrrell to win the Manufacturers' Cup for the first and only time. Their car was powered by the famous Cosworth DFV V8, while rivals BRM and Ferrari made use of self-designed V12 engines. 1970 champions Team Lotus had a desultory season after the death of their driver and champion Jochen Rindt, experimenting with a gas turbine engine and four-wheel drive, but ending up just fifth in the standings.

Two Formula One drivers lost their lives this year while racing: Pedro Rodríguez crashed his Ferrari 512 in July, at an Interserie race at the Norisring, and Jo Siffert died in October, in a fiery crash during the Victory Race at Brands Hatch.

This was the first season where at least 22 cars started every championship race, except the Monaco Grand Prix, where 18 cars started.

== Teams and drivers ==
The following teams and drivers competed in the championship.

| Entrant | Constructor | Chassis | Engine | Tyre | Driver | Rounds |
|---|---|---|---|---|---|---|
| (United Kingdom) Gold Leaf Team Lotus (United Kingdom) World Wide Racing | Lotus-Ford | 72C; 72D | Ford Cosworth DFV 3.0 V8 | F | (Brazil) Emerson Fittipaldi | 1–3, 5–8, 10–11 |
| (United Kingdom) Gold Leaf Team Lotus (United Kingdom) World Wide Racing | Lotus-Ford | 72C; 72D | Ford Cosworth DFV 3.0 V8 | F | (Sweden) Reine Wisell | 1–5, 7–8, 10–11 |
| (United Kingdom) Gold Leaf Team Lotus (United Kingdom) World Wide Racing | Lotus-Ford | 72C; 72D | Ford Cosworth DFV 3.0 V8 | F | (South Africa) Dave Charlton | 4, 6 |
| (United Kingdom) Gold Leaf Team Lotus (United Kingdom) World Wide Racing | Lotus-Pratt & Whitney | 56B | Pratt & Whitney STN76 tbn | F | (Australia) David Walker | 4 |
| (United Kingdom) Gold Leaf Team Lotus (United Kingdom) World Wide Racing | Lotus-Pratt & Whitney | 56B | Pratt & Whitney STN76 tbn | F | (Sweden) Reine Wisell | 6 |
| (United Kingdom) Gold Leaf Team Lotus (United Kingdom) World Wide Racing | Lotus-Pratt & Whitney | 56B | Pratt & Whitney STN76 tbn | F | (Brazil) Emerson Fittipaldi | 9 |
| (Italy) Scuderia Ferrari SpA SEFAC | Ferrari | 312B; 312B2 | Ferrari 001 3.0 F12; Ferrari 001/1 3.0 F12 | F | (Belgium) Jacky Ickx | All |
| (Italy) Scuderia Ferrari SpA SEFAC | Ferrari | 312B; 312B2 | Ferrari 001 3.0 F12; Ferrari 001/1 3.0 F12 | F | (Switzerland) Clay Regazzoni | All |
| (Italy) Scuderia Ferrari SpA SEFAC | Ferrari | 312B; 312B2 | Ferrari 001 3.0 F12; Ferrari 001/1 3.0 F12 | F | (United States) Mario Andretti | 1–4, 7, 10–11 |
| (United Kingdom) STP March Racing Team | March-Ford | 711 | Ford Cosworth DFV 3.0 V8 | F | (Sweden) Ronnie Peterson | 1–4, 6–11 |
| (United Kingdom) STP March Racing Team | March-Ford | 711 | Ford Cosworth DFV 3.0 V8 | F | (Spain) Alex Soler-Roig | 1–5 |
| (United Kingdom) STP March Racing Team | March-Ford | 711 | Ford Cosworth DFV 3.0 V8 | F | (Italy) Nanni Galli | 5–6, 9–11 |
| (United Kingdom) STP March Racing Team | March-Ford | 711 | Ford Cosworth DFV 3.0 V8 | F | (Austria) Niki Lauda | 8 |
| (United Kingdom) STP March Racing Team | March-Ford | 711 | Ford Cosworth DFV 3.0 V8 | F | (United Kingdom) Mike Beuttler | 10 |
| (United Kingdom) STP March Racing Team | March-Alfa Romeo | 711 | Alfa Romeo T33 3.0 V8 | F | (Italy) Andrea de Adamich | 1–2, 5–7, 9, 11 |
| (United Kingdom) STP March Racing Team | March-Alfa Romeo | 711 | Alfa Romeo T33 3.0 V8 | F | (Italy) Nanni Galli | 3–4, 7–8 |
| (United Kingdom) STP March Racing Team | March-Alfa Romeo | 711 | Alfa Romeo T33 3.0 V8 | F | (Sweden) Ronnie Peterson | 5 |
| (United Kingdom) Elf Team Tyrrell | Elf Tyrrell-Ford | 001; 002; 003 | Ford Cosworth DFV 3.0 V8 | G | (United Kingdom) Jackie Stewart | All |
| (United Kingdom) Elf Team Tyrrell | Elf Tyrrell-Ford | 001; 002; 003 | Ford Cosworth DFV 3.0 V8 | G | (France) François Cevert | All |
| (United Kingdom) Elf Team Tyrrell | Elf Tyrrell-Ford | 001; 002; 003 | Ford Cosworth DFV 3.0 V8 | G | (United States) Peter Revson | 11 |
| (United Kingdom) Bruce McLaren Motor Racing | McLaren-Ford | M19A; M14A | Ford Cosworth DFV 3.0 V8 | G | (New Zealand) Denny Hulme | 1–8, 10–11 |
| (United Kingdom) Bruce McLaren Motor Racing | McLaren-Ford | M19A; M14A | Ford Cosworth DFV 3.0 V8 | G | (United Kingdom) Peter Gethin | 1–7 |
| (United Kingdom) Bruce McLaren Motor Racing | McLaren-Ford | M19A; M14A | Ford Cosworth DFV 3.0 V8 | G | (United Kingdom) Jackie Oliver | 6, 8–9 |
| (United States) Penske/K.F. White Racing | McLaren-Ford | M19A | Ford Cosworth DFV 3.0 V8 | G | (United States) Mark Donohue | 10–11 |
| (United States) Penske/K.F. White Racing | McLaren-Ford | M19A | Ford Cosworth DFV 3.0 V8 | G | (United Kingdom) David Hobbs | 11 |
| (United Kingdom) Motor Racing Developments | Brabham-Ford | BT33; BT34 | Ford Cosworth DFV 3.0 V8 | G | (United Kingdom) Graham Hill | All |
| (United Kingdom) Motor Racing Developments | Brabham-Ford | BT33; BT34 | Ford Cosworth DFV 3.0 V8 | G | (Australia) Tim Schenken | 2–11 |
| (United Kingdom) Ecurie Evergreen | Brabham-Ford | BT33 | Ford Cosworth DFV 3.0 V8 | G | (United Kingdom) Chris Craft | 10–11 |
| (South Africa) Scribante Lucky Strike Racing | Brabham-Ford | BT33 | Ford Cosworth DFV 3.0 V8 | G | (South Africa) Dave Charlton | 1 |
| (United Kingdom) Yardley Team BRM | BRM | P160; P153 | BRM P142 3.0 V12 | F | (Mexico) Pedro Rodríguez | 1–5 |
| (United Kingdom) Yardley Team BRM | BRM | P160; P153 | BRM P142 3.0 V12 | F | (Switzerland) Jo Siffert | All |
| (United Kingdom) Yardley Team BRM | BRM | P160; P153 | BRM P142 3.0 V12 | F | (New Zealand) Howden Ganley | All |
| (United Kingdom) Yardley Team BRM | BRM | P160; P153 | BRM P142 3.0 V12 | F | (United Kingdom) Vic Elford | 7 |
| (United Kingdom) Yardley Team BRM | BRM | P160; P153 | BRM P142 3.0 V12 | F | (Austria) Helmut Marko | 8–11 |
| (United Kingdom) Yardley Team BRM | BRM | P160; P153 | BRM P142 3.0 V12 | F | (United Kingdom) Peter Gethin | 8–11 |
| (United Kingdom) Yardley Team BRM | BRM | P160; P153 | BRM P142 3.0 V12 | F | (Canada) George Eaton | 10 |
| (United Kingdom) Yardley Team BRM | BRM | P160; P153 | BRM P142 3.0 V12 | F | (Canada) John Cannon | 11 |
| (France) Équipe Matra Sports | Matra | MS120B | Matra MS71 3.0 V12 | G | (New Zealand) Chris Amon | 1–7, 9–11 |
| (France) Équipe Matra Sports | Matra | MS120B | Matra MS71 3.0 V12 | G | (France) Jean-Pierre Beltoise | 2–6, 10–11 |
| (United Kingdom) Brooke Bond Oxo - Rob Walker (United Kingdom) Auto Motor und Sport Eifelland Team Surtees (United Kingdom) Team Surtees | Surtees-Ford | TS9; TS7 | Ford Cosworth DFV 3.0 V8 | F | (United Kingdom) John Surtees | All |
| (United Kingdom) Brooke Bond Oxo - Rob Walker (United Kingdom) Auto Motor und Sport Eifelland Team Surtees (United Kingdom) Team Surtees | Surtees-Ford | TS9; TS7 | Ford Cosworth DFV 3.0 V8 | F | (West Germany) Rolf Stommelen | 1–10 |
| (United Kingdom) Brooke Bond Oxo - Rob Walker (United Kingdom) Auto Motor und Sport Eifelland Team Surtees (United Kingdom) Team Surtees | Surtees-Ford | TS9; TS7 | Ford Cosworth DFV 3.0 V8 | F | (United Kingdom) Brian Redman | 1 |
| (United Kingdom) Brooke Bond Oxo - Rob Walker (United Kingdom) Auto Motor und Sport Eifelland Team Surtees (United Kingdom) Team Surtees | Surtees-Ford | TS9; TS7 | Ford Cosworth DFV 3.0 V8 | F | (United Kingdom) Derek Bell | 6 |
| (United Kingdom) Brooke Bond Oxo - Rob Walker (United Kingdom) Auto Motor und Sport Eifelland Team Surtees (United Kingdom) Team Surtees | Surtees-Ford | TS9; TS7 | Ford Cosworth DFV 3.0 V8 | F | (United Kingdom) Mike Hailwood | 9, 11 |
| (United Kingdom) Brooke Bond Oxo - Rob Walker (United Kingdom) Auto Motor und Sport Eifelland Team Surtees (United Kingdom) Team Surtees | Surtees-Ford | TS9; TS7 | Ford Cosworth DFV 3.0 V8 | F | (United States) Sam Posey | 11 |
| (United Kingdom) Brooke Bond Oxo - Rob Walker (United Kingdom) Auto Motor und Sport Eifelland Team Surtees (United Kingdom) Team Surtees | Surtees-Ford | TS9; TS7 | Ford Cosworth DFV 3.0 V8 | F | (Netherlands) Gijs van Lennep | 11 |
| (United Kingdom) Frank Williams Racing Cars | March-Ford | 701; 711 | Ford Cosworth DFV 3.0 V8 | G | (France) Henri Pescarolo | All |
| (United Kingdom) Frank Williams Racing Cars | March-Ford | 701; 711 | Ford Cosworth DFV 3.0 V8 | G | (France) Max Jean | 5 |
| (Sweden) Ecurie Bonnier | McLaren-Ford | M7C | Ford Cosworth DFV 3.0 V8 | G | (Sweden) Jo Bonnier | 1, 7–9, 11 |
| (Sweden) Ecurie Bonnier | McLaren-Ford | M7C | Ford Cosworth DFV 3.0 V8 | G | (Austria) Helmut Marko | 7 |
| (South Africa) Team Gunston | March-Ford | 701 | Ford Cosworth DFV 3.0 V8 | F | (Rhodesia) John Love | 1 |
| (South Africa) Team Gunston | Brabham-Ford | BT26A | Ford Cosworth DFV 3.0 V8 | F | (South Africa) Jackie Pretorius | 1 |
| (United States) Gene Mason Racing | March-Ford | 711 | Ford Cosworth DFV 3.0 V8 | F | (United States) Skip Barber | 3–4, 10–11 |
| (Netherlands) Stichting Autoraces Nederland | Surtees-Ford | TS7 | Ford Cosworth DFV 3.0 V8 | F | (Netherlands) Gijs van Lennep | 4 |
| (Switzerland) Jo Siffert Automobiles | March-Ford | 701 | Ford Cosworth DFV 3.0 V8 | F | (France) François Mazet | 5 |
| (United Kingdom) Clarke-Mordaunt-Guthrie Racing | March-Ford | 711 | Ford Cosworth DFV 3.0 V8 | F | (United Kingdom) Mike Beuttler | 6–9 |
| (France) Shell Arnold Team | March-Ford | 701 | Ford Cosworth DFV 3.0 V8 | G | (France) Jean-Pierre Jarier | 9 |
| Jolly Club of Switzerland | Bellasi-Ford | F1 70 | Ford Cosworth DFV 3.0 V8 | G | (Switzerland) Silvio Moser | 9 |
| (United States) Pete Lovely Volkswagen Inc. | Lotus-Ford | 69 Special | Ford Cosworth DFV 3.0 V8 | F | (United States) Pete Lovely | 10–11 |

=== Team and driver changes ===
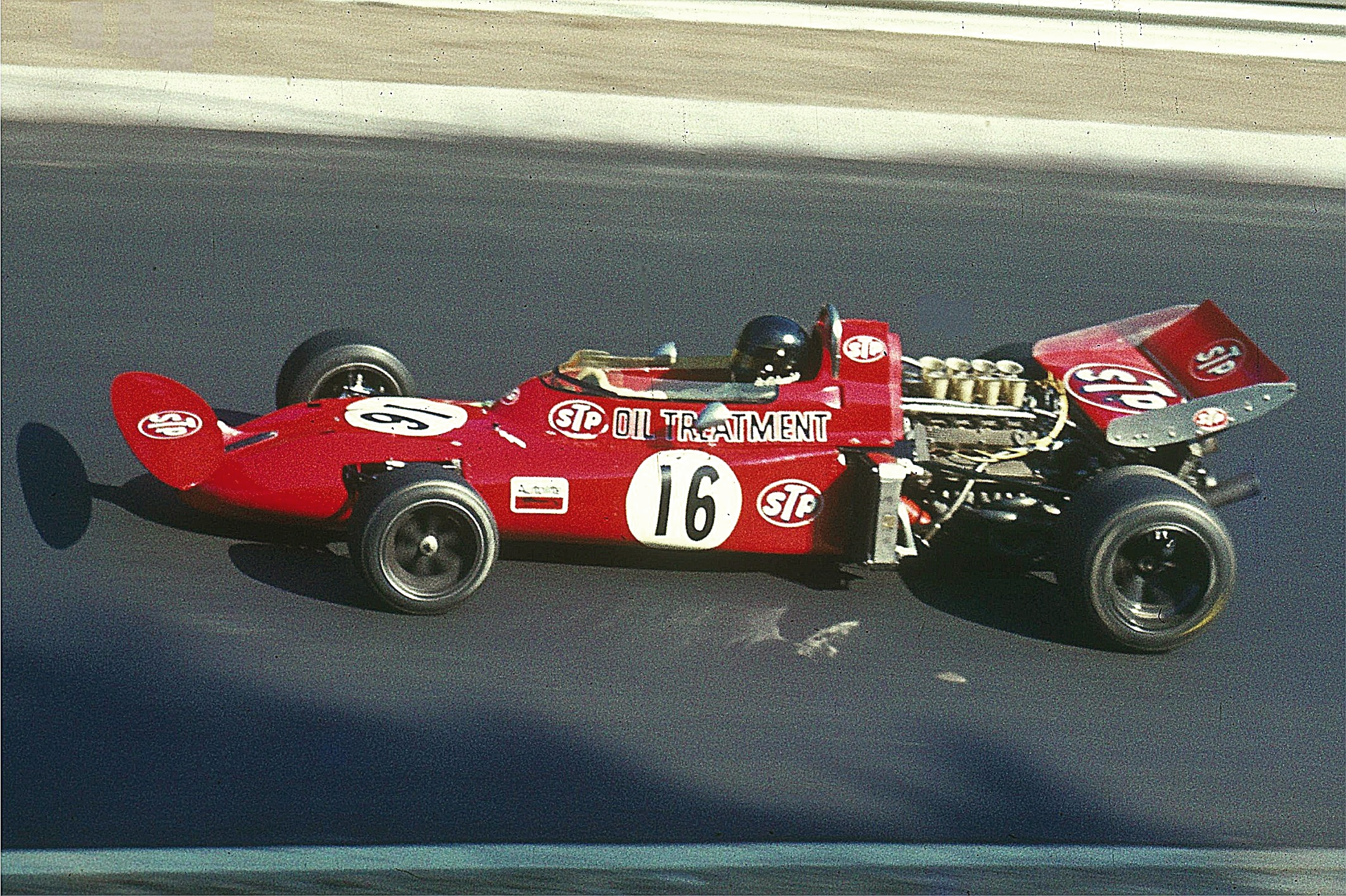
Andrea de Adamich, driving the March-Alfa Romeo in the German Grand Prix

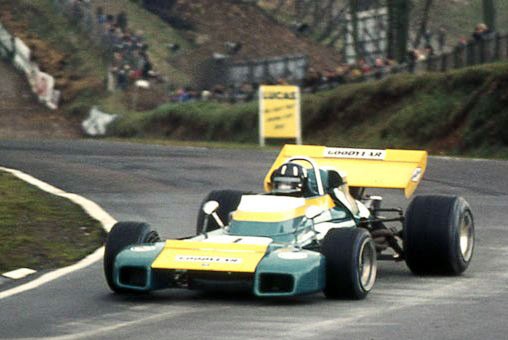
Graham Hill, pictured during the 1971 Race of Champions, signed with Brabham.

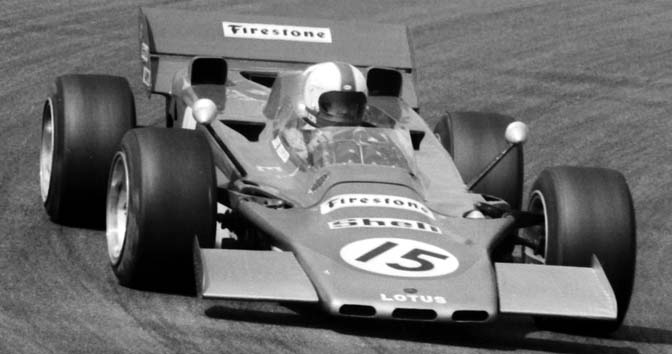
David Walker, driving the gas turbine-powered Lotus 56B

While Lotus and Tyrrell had kept their line-up from 1970, quite a lot of changes happened further down the field:

- Ferrari signed Mario Andretti next to their 1970 drivers Jacky Ickx and Clay Regazzoni.
- March arrived with a brand new line-up of Ronnie Peterson, who previously drove a privately entered March, Alex Soler-Roig, for his first full-time drive, and Andrea de Adamich. The Italian drove an Alfa Romeo powered McLaren in 1970 and moved, together with the Alfa Romeo project, to the March team for this year. Peterson and Soler-Roig, meanwhile, kept using the Cosworth DFV engines.
- Jo Siffert moved from March to BRM, next to regular driver Pedro Rodríguez and debutant Howden Ganley.
- Jack Brabham retired from racing and he hired two-time champion Graham Hill to drive for his team. In the second entry, Tim Schenken was hired instead of Rolf Stommelen, who moved to Surtees. Schenken had previously driven for Frank Williams' team, but they attracted Henri Pescarolo from Matra. Williams also switched from a De Tomaso chassis to a March.

==== Mid-season changes ====
- Andrea de Adamich shared the drive of the March-Alfa Romeo with fellow Italian Nanni Galli. Galli also took the place of Alex Soler-Roig when the Spaniard quit the team. At the Austrian Grand Prix, future champion Niki Lauda made his debut.
- Lotus experimented with a four-wheel drive gas turbine-powered car, the 56B. Although the engine did not deliver concrete success, the excellent chassis and wedge-shaped bodywork would serve as an inspiration to multiple championship winning teams in the years to come.
- On 11 July, Pedro Rodríguez was killed at the Norisring in Nuremberg, West Germany, driving a Ferrari 512 M in an Interserie sports car race. He was fourth in the Formula One championship at the time.
- Ahead of the Austrian Grand Prix, Peter Gethin moved from McLaren to BRM. His seat was filled by Jackie Oliver and then Mark Donohue. It seemed a successful move for Gethin as, just a month later, he won the Italian Grand Prix with the highest average speed in Formula One history. It would, however, turn out to be his only podium finish and, ironically, he would never even lead a lap, having jumped from fourth to first in the final lap of that race at Monza.

== Calendar ==
| Round | Grand Prix | Circuit | Date |
|---|---|---|---|
| 1 | South African Grand Prix | (South Africa) Kyalami Grand Prix Circuit, Midrand | 6 March |
| 2 | Spanish Grand Prix | (Spain) Montjuïc Circuit, Barcelona | 18 April |
| 3 | Monaco Grand Prix | Circuit de Monaco, Monte Carlo | 23 May |
| 4 | Dutch Grand Prix | (Netherlands) Circuit Park Zandvoort, Zandvoort | 20 June |
| 5 | French Grand Prix | (France) Circuit Paul Ricard, Le Castellet | 4 July |
| 6 | British Grand Prix | (United Kingdom) Silverstone Circuit, Silverstone | 17 July |
| 7 | German Grand Prix | (West Germany) Nürburgring, Nürburg | 1 August |
| 8 | Austrian Grand Prix | (Austria) Österreichring, Spielberg | 15 August |
| 9 | Italian Grand Prix | (Italy) Autodromo Nazionale di Monza, Monza | 5 September |
| 10 | Canadian Grand Prix | (Canada) Mosport Park, Bowmanville | 19 September |
| 11 | United States Grand Prix | (United States) Watkins Glen International, New York | 3 October |

=== Calendar changes ===
- The Spanish Grand Prix was moved from Jarama to Montjuïc, in keeping with the event-sharing arrangement between the two circuits. Likewise, the British Grand Prix was moved from Brands Hatch to Silverstone and the Canadian Grand Prix was moved from Mont-Tremblant to Mosport Park.
- The French Grand Prix was moved from Circuit de Charade to the newly built Circuit Paul Ricard.
- The German Grand Prix returned to the Nürburgring for 1971 after major safety changes had been made to the circuit. It had been moved to the Hockenheimring in 1970 after drivers refused to race at the Nürburgring in the condition it was in.

==== Cancelled rounds ====
- The Argentine Grand Prix was probably listed in error on the provisional calendar scheduled for 24 January. However the Autódromo de Buenos Aires circuit had to prove itself with a non-F1 event first after a ten year-absence.
- The Belgian Grand Prix was originally scheduled for 6 June, but was cancelled because of the failure of the track owners and authorities to bring Circuit de Spa-Francorchamps up to mandatory safety standards meant that the rural circuit was deemed unsuitable for Formula One cars to race on.
- The Mexican Grand Prix was originally scheduled for 24 October at Autódromo Magdalena Mixhuca but was cancelled in August due to organisational problems and lack of interest due to the recent death of the Mexican driver Pedro Rodríguez. Further there were major crowd safety concerns that arose from the 1970 Mexican Grand Prix.

== Regulation changes ==
=== Sporting regulations ===
The maximum race distance for World Championship Grand Prix races was reduced from 400 km (250 mi) to 325 km (202 mi).

=== Safety regulations ===
It was mandated that a driver should be able to evacuate himself or be evacuated from his cockpit within 5 seconds.

== Season summary ==
=== Pre-season report ===
Austrian Jochen Rindt had won the championship posthumously in 1970 for Lotus-Ford; he was killed at Monza during practice for the Italian Grand Prix in September of that year. Although three races remained after Monza, Rindt's points lead after four consecutive Grand Prix victories earlier in the season was enough to secure him the championship. Briton Jackie Stewart, world champion in 1969, had a transitional year in 1970, using a customer March car after Matra refused to allow Stewart's boss Ken Tyrrell to put a Ford-Cosworth DFV V8 in their car in place of Matra's own V12. Tyrrell was designing his own car in secret in England, and the March was an interim solution. The new Tyrrell 001 car was first raced by the Scottish Stewart at the Mont-Tremblant circuit in Quebec, Canada- and was immediately competitive, but he retired due to mechanical failure. The car's competitiveness enabled designer Derek Gardner to produce an even more competitive car for the 1971 season- the Tyrrell 002 and 003. 002 had a longer wheelbase and was exclusively for Stewart's tall French teammate Francois Cevert, and 003 was exclusively for the short Stewart. These 2 cars were mechanically almost identical; the only difference being the longer wheelbase for Cevert's height.

Over the winter months Ferrari technical director Mauro Forghieri and his engineers at Ferrari developed the car into 312B/2 form. Jacky Ickx and Clay Regazzoni were retained but the team's third driver, Italian Ignazio Giunti was killed in January during the Buenos Aires 1000 kilometer long-distance sportscar race. Jean-Pierre Beltoise was pushing his Matra sportscar back to the pits when he was hit by Giunti's Ferrari 312P; the Italian was killed in the ensuing crash. As a result, Mario Andretti was hired on a part-time basis to be the team's third driver; Andretti had been driving Ferraris in long distance sportscar races during the two previous years. Tyrrell retained Jackie Stewart and Francois Cevert, while Team Lotus also developed its 1970 car for Brazilian Emerson Fittipaldi and Swede Reine Wisell (although design work was progressing on the Lotus 56, a gas turbine car powered by Pratt & Whitney engines). March lost both of its 1970 drivers: Chris Amon, moving to Matra to join Beltoise and Jo Siffert replacing Jack Oliver at BRM as teammate to Pedro Rodríguez and new driver Howden Ganley. McLaren continued with Denny Hulme and Peter Gethin but the Alfa Romeo engines used by Andrea de Adamich moved to March where the Italian became Ronnie Peterson's teammate in the curious March 711 factory cars. Rob Walker decided that he could no longer afford to continue his private team and transferred his Brooke Bond Oxo sponsorship to Surtees, which recruited second driver Rolf Stommelen (with backing from Auto Motor und Sport and Eifelland caravans) from Brabham.

Walker's decision to stop racing freed veteran Graham Hill and he moved to Brabham (which was now being run by Ron Tauranac, and would be bought by Bernie Ecclestone that year) where he was joined by former Williams driver Tim Schenken while Williams entered old Marches for Derek Bell and Matra refugee Henri Pescarolo.

The first Argentine Grand Prix since 1960 was held as a non-championship Grand Prix in the sweltering heat of a January summer in the capital city of Buenos Aires; the reason for this was that the FIA stipulated that in order for a country to host an official championship Grand Prix round, the organizers had to prove themselves by successfully running an interim non-championship race to their standards. This race was held at the slightly modified Buenos Aires Autodrome, the same venue used previously. Run in two heats, it was won by New Zealander Chris Amon in a Matra.

=== Round 1: South Africa ===
The South African Grand Prix, held at the fast and flowing high-altitude Kyalami circuit between Johannesburg and Pretoria in March kicked off the championship season. Stewart took pole, ahead of the twelve-cylinder cars of Amon, Regazzoni and Andretti. At the start, Regazzoni took the lead going into the Crowthorne corner ahead of Fittipaldi, Ickx (who had started 8th), Hulme, Rodríguez, Andretti, and Stewart. Amon dropped to 14th. Hulme in his McLaren-Ford passed Fittipaldi for second then Regazzoni for the lead. Hulme led the race until the 76th of 79 laps- when he had to come into the pits to repair some suspension damage his car had suffered. Andretti took the lead and won, followed by Stewart, Regazzoni, Wisell, Amon, and Hulme.

=== 7-week gap between Rounds 1 and 2 ===
There were three non-championship events between the first and second 1971 Formula One championship rounds. Two weeks after the South African Grand Prix, a number of teams traveled to England (where most F1 teams were and are based) to compete in the Race of Champions, held at the undulating and bumpy Brands Hatch circuit just outside London. This race, run at a shorter distance than is usual for a Grand Prix was won by the Swiss Regazzoni in a Ferrari, ahead of pole-sitter Jackie Stewart and veteran Briton John Surtees.

The Questor Grand Prix in the western United States was held one week after the Race of Champions, at the Ontario Motor Speedway in southern California. The circuit was based on the Indianapolis Motor Speedway, but also had an interior road circuit which also utilized part of the speedway oval. This race, like the Argentine race, was run in two heats; Mario Andretti won in a Ferrari ahead of Jackie Stewart. Financial problems for the organizers meant that Ontario was never to be used again for a Formula One race; the circuit fell into financial disrepair and was closed in 1980. The Auto Club Speedway of California in nearby Fontana effectively replaced this venue in 1996.

Another race in England, the Spring Trophy, was held at Oulton Park near Manchester. This event was not entered by Ferrari, and Stewart took pole again ahead of Briton Peter Gethin in a McLaren-Ford, Rodríguez and Siffert BRMs. In misty, damp and cold weather, Rodríguez won the event, ahead of Gethin and Stewart.

=== Round 2: Spain ===
The Spanish Grand Prix in 1971 was held at the Montjuic Park city street circuit in Barcelona; the previous year it had been held at the Circuito del Jarama near Madrid as part of a rotation with the Catalan circuit. The Ferraris of Ickx and Regazzoni were 1–2 on the grid respectively, followed by Amon, Stewart, Rodríguez, Beltoise, Gethin and Andretti. Six of the first eight cars had 12-cylinder engines. Stewart took second place at the start, and passed Ickx for the lead on lap 6. Amon overtook Regazzoni for third place on lap 3. Stewart began to increase his lead over Ickx while Amon ran third; Regazzoni went out on lap 13 with a fuel pump failure which promoted Rodríguez to fourth place with Andretti fifth and Denny Hulme sixth in his McLaren-Ford. In the mid-race Andretti retired with an engine problem and so Hulme moved to fifth place and Beltoise took sixth. In the closing laps Ickx closed the gap to Stewart but he was still 3.4 seconds behind at the finish, ahead of Amon.

A third non-championship race took place in England three weeks after the Spanish Grand Prix, at Silverstone. This race also included Chevrolet-powered Formula 5000 cars. Ferrari did not enter, and the race, run in two heats, was won by British veteran Graham Hill in a Brabham-Ford.

=== Round 3: Monaco ===
Two weeks after the non-championship International Trophy race and five weeks after the second round in Spain came the most prestigious round of the calendar, the Monaco Grand Prix, which was also the 200th World Championship Grand Prix. Qualifying was run in rainy conditions, and Stewart took pole by 1.2 seconds from Jacky Ickx's Ferrari. The second row featured Siffert's BRM and Amon's Matra; then it was Rodríguez, Hulme, Beltoise, Ronnie Peterson in a March, Hill and John Surtees in a car of his own construction. Team Lotus were far down with Wisell 11th and Fittipaldi 17th. Amon had problems at the start and lost half a lap so Ickx and Stewart were left to fight for the first corner with Siffert, who managed to slip ahead of the Ferrari and take second place behind Stewart. Five-time Monaco Grand Prix winner Graham Hill made a mistake and crashed on the second lap, and his Brabham teammate Tim Schenken hit a barrier two laps later while swerving to avoid Francois Cevert's Tyrrell-Ford when the car's engine cut. Both men got going again but Cevert crashed two laps later when the DFV engine cut again. Stewart gradually increased his lead, while Peterson climbed up to second place in the mid-race, passing both Ickx and Siffert. Stewart was able to hold on to take victory ahead of Peterson and Ickx; Siffert later went out with an engine failure, so fourth place went to Hulme.

=== 4-week gap between Rounds 3 and 4 ===
The Belgian Grand Prix was originally supposed to be held as a championship round two weeks after the Monaco event on 6 June at the fast 8.7 mile (14.1 km) Spa-Francorchamps circuit, but the failure of the track owners and authorities to bring Spa up to mandatory safety standards meant that the rural circuit was deemed unsuitable for Formula One cars to race on and the event was cancelled. Formula One did not return to Spa until 1983, after it was re-designed and shortened in 1979.

Another non-championship round, the Rhein-Pokalrennen, was held three weeks after the Monaco Grand Prix at the very fast Hockenheim circuit in West Germany, and was won by Jacky Ickx in a Ferrari. This race was run on the same day as the final day of the 24 Hours of Le Mans sportscar race in western France.

=== Round 4: Netherlands ===
One week after the non-championship Hockenheim event and four weeks after Monaco was the Dutch Grand Prix, held at the very fast and dangerous Zandvoort circuit, west of Amsterdam. The bumpy circuit had few safety features. Ickx took pole, ahead of Rodríguez, Stewart, Regazzoni and Amon. The race was run in wet conditions, and at the start Mario Andretti's Ferrari was missing because of a fuel pump problem. He did start the race but was a long way behind and retired after just a few laps.

Ickx went ahead of Rodríguez, Stewart and Amon. Siffert blew his chances with a spin. On the second lap Amon spun out and on the third lap Stewart had a rare spin and dropped to eighth place; the Goodyear-shod runners were suffering compared to the Firestone-shod cars. This left Regazzoni third and Surtees fourth ahead of Wisell. The Swede did not last long because a rear wheel worked loose and trying to solve the problem he reversed into the pitlane and was disqualified. As everyone else struggled Ickx and Rodríguez built up a big lead with Rodríguez moving ahead on the ninth lap. They ran closely for a number of laps, but towards the end Ickx pulled away to win by nearly eight seconds. Regazzoni finished third. The Dutch Grand Prix was not held in 1972 due to the outdated facilities of the circuit; it returned for 1973.

=== Round 5: France ===
Two weeks after the Dutch race was the French Grand Prix at the brand-new Paul Ricard circuit near Marseille in the south of France. This circuit, in stark comparison to the rudimentary facilities of Zandvoort, was one of the most modern racing circuits in the world, with a smooth surface and state-of-the-art facilities not seen before in Formula One. It also had a long 1.1 mile straight, typical of French circuits. In the two previous years, the event had held at the twisty Charade public road circuit near Clermont-Ferrand; this was a very different type of circuit to Paul Ricard. Stewart took pole ahead of Regazzoni, Ickx and Graham Hill in a Brabham. At the start Stewart went into the lead with Regazzoni chasing. Ickx was in trouble with his engine and dropped quickly back to retire while there was a battle for third place between Rodríguez and Beltoise. On the 19th lap Peterson's Alfa Romeo engine blew up and Regazzoni spun off on the oil. Hill had a similar accident but was able to get going and pit for repairs. This left Rodríguez in second place. By then, Cevert had moved into third later the ignition in Rodríguez's BRM failed. So Cevert found himself promoted to second place behind Stewart, giving Tyrrell a 1-2 finish. Third place went to Fittipaldi who had come through the field after starting from 17th.

=== Round 6: Britain ===
Two weeks after France was the British Grand Prix at Silverstone. Before the race, Pedro Rodríguez had been killed in a crash while driving a Ferrari 512S sportscar at a German Interserie race at the Norisring street circuit. At the start Regazzoni and Ickx took the lead for Ferrari with Stewart third. At the tail of the field Oliver ran into the back of Graham Hill's Brabham, putting both men out of the race. Stewart and Siffert overtook Ickx during the second lap and on lap four Stewart overtook Regazzoni at Stowe Corner. He immediately began to build up a lead. Siffert overtook Regazzoni in the course of the fifth lap. Siffert began to suffer vibration problems and was caught and repassed by Regazzoni on lap 17. On lap 37 Ickx went into the pits to retire with engine trouble and five laps later Siffert also retired with a misfire. This put Peterson up to third place with Schenken and Fittipaldi, who had dropped to 11th early on, chasing him. On Lap 48 Regazzoni retired with engine trouble. With a few laps to go, Schenken suffered transmission failure and retired, leaving third place for Fittipaldi, and a home victory for Stewart, ahead of Peterson. Everyone else was lapped.

=== Round 7: Germany ===
The German Grand Prix returned to an updated 14.2 mile (22.8 km) Nurburgring after a year's absence from the track due to safety concerns. The circuit had been resurfaced and lined with Armco barrier, some of the worst bumps were taken out or smoothed over and the circuit was made less twisty, and was therefore a little faster than before. But with the layout being largely unchanged, the circuit was still dangerous. Stewart took pole ahead of Ickx, Siffert and Regazzoni. The race distance was 12 laps, compared to the 14 lap distance for the 1969 race. There was a crowd of around 375,000 for the race on Sunday. Graham Hill (Brabham) and Reine Wisell (Lotus) both had problems before the start only 20 cars lined up on the grid. Ickx took the lead from Stewart but the Tyrrell was soon back ahead again and pulling away from the rest with Ickx being chased by Regazzoni, Hulme, Siffert, Peterson and Cevert. On the second lap, while pushing hard to keep up with Stewart, Ickx spun off at the Eiskurve corner and Regazzoni went off as he tried to avoid his teammate. This left Stewart with a big lead over Siffert (who had overtaken Hulme). Regazzoni rejoined in third and Peterson (who had also overtaken Hulme) was fourth. The McLaren driver soon fell behind Andretti and Cevert, and the Tyrrell driver soon passed the Ferrari so was up to fifth. In the laps that followed, Cevert overtook Peterson, Siffert (who soon dropped behind Regazzoni) and then Regazzoni himself. Thereafter the order remained stable at the front with a Tyrrell 1-2 the result, with Stewart winning his fifth race of the season. Regazzoni was third with Andretti catching and passing Peterson for fourth.

=== Round 8: Austria ===
For only the third time, the Austrian Grand Prix was a championship round. The race was held at the Österreichring in the rural Styrian mountains near Graz. Jackie Stewart had a large lead in the driver's championship - 51 points compared to second-placed Jacky Ickx's 19 points and Ronnie Peterson's 16 points. If Ickx and Peterson both failed to score here, Stewart would be champion. Jo Siffert took pole in his BRM, followed by Stewart, Cevert, Regazzoni, Fittipaldi and Ickx. Siffert took the lead at the start and held off Stewart's attacks with Regazzoni, Cevert, Ickx and Schenken chasing after them. Both Ferraris retired early with engine trouble. This promoted Cevert to third place and Schenken to fourth. As the race progressed, Cevert closed on Stewart, who was struggling with the handling of his car. On lap 23 Cevert was waved through into second place. On Lap 31, Ickx had retired with problems with his Ferrari engine's spark plugs and Peterson was running in ninth place and out of the points with serious handling problems. On Lap 36 Stewart's race ended with a broken rear axle. Cevert's engine failed on lap 43, promoting Fittipaldi to second, having overtaken Schenken a few laps earlier. In the final laps Siffert suffered a deflating tire but he was so far ahead that he was able to nurse the car to the line, beating Fittipaldi by just over four seconds. Peterson finished out of the points in eighth, so Stewart was World Champion for the second time. Niki Lauda made his debut in this race in a March; he qualified 21st and retired on lap 20 with handling problems.

The Gold Cup non-championship Grand Prix at Oulton Park was won by veteran John Surtees in his own Surtees car. This race was held one week after the Austrian Grand Prix. The Tyrrell team did not enter this event.

=== Round 9: Italy ===
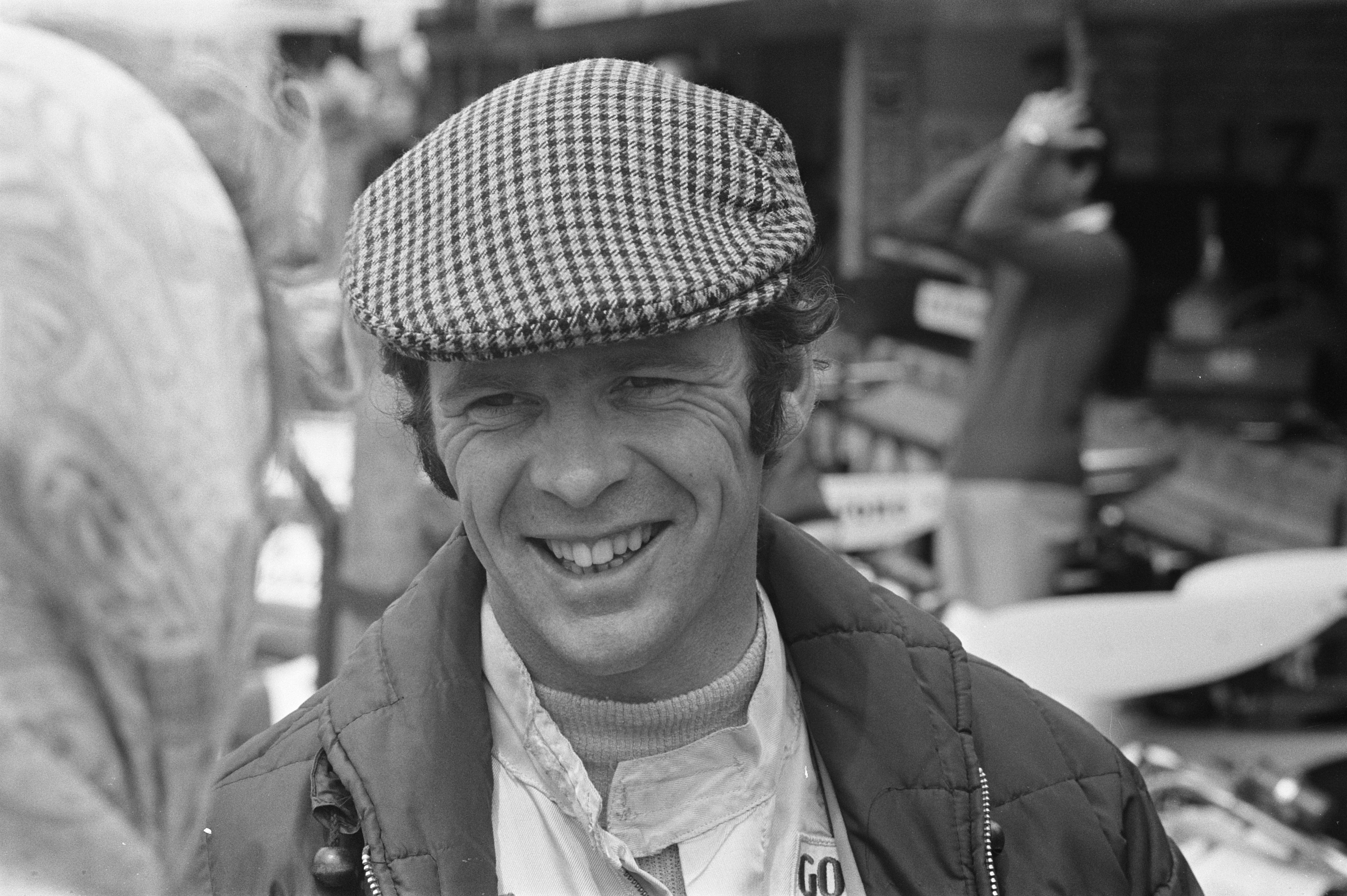
Peter Gethin won the 1971 Italian Grand Prix, his only World Championship Grand Prix victory.

A year since the death of Jochen Rindt at Monza, there were still some legal problems between Team Lotus and the Italian authorities which meant that Team Lotus did not officially enter the event, although a Lotus 56 did enter under the name World Wide Racing. This car was powered by an American Pratt & Whitney turbine jet engine. McLaren was also down to just one entry as Denny Hulme was away in the United States for a USAC race in California. Matra was also running only one car as Jean-Pierre Beltoise was still suspended as a result of the sportscar accident in January in Buenos Aires which had killed Ignazio Giunti. The field was bolstered by a third Surtees, entered for Mike Hailwood, a multiple Grand Prix motorcycle champion making the transition to car racing. On the fast sweeps of Monza the V12 cars were very competitive and Chris Amon took pole in his Matra with Jacky Ickx alongside in his Ferrari. The second row featured the BRMs of Jo Siffert and Howden Ganley and the first V8 car was the Tyrrell of Francois Cevert, fifth on the grid. At the start of the race Regazzoni made a fast start from the fourth row to take the lead. On lap 16 both Stewart and Ickx retired with engine failures and two laps later Regazzoni went out as well. Eventually, a close five-car battle developed for the lead, with Peter Gethin taking his only Grand Prix victory by 0.010 secs. The first five cars were all covered by 0.61s; it was the closest finish in the history of the World Championship and the fastest ever race, with an average speed of 150.75 mph. Peterson was second with Cevert third, Hailwood fourth and Ganley fifth. Amon was sixth over half a minute behind. Chicanes were added to Monza's layout for subsequent years, lowering average speeds and effectively eliminating the slipstream battles that highlighted previous Italian Grands Prix at Monza.

=== Round 10: Canada ===
Two weeks after the Italian Grand Prix, the Canadian Grand Prix was held at Mosport Park circuit near Toronto. World Champion Stewart took pole position ahead of Siffert, Cevert, Fittipaldi, Amon, Peterson, Wisell, and Mark Donohue in a Penske-entered McLaren. The Ferraris were not competitive with Ickx 12th, Andretti 13th and Regazzoni 18th. 37-year old Wayne Kelly was killed on lap 2 of a Formula Ford support race and the Grand Prix was delayed, and by the time the race started it was pouring with rain. Howden Ganley crashed his BRM in the warm-up period before the race and so could not make the start. At the start Stewart went into the lead with Peterson second, chased by Beltoise, Donohue, Fittipaldi, Cevert and the rest. On the third lap Graham Hill crashed his Brabham and five laps later Regazzoni did the same in his Ferrari, which caught fire. Stewart had a firm grip on the race while Peterson had to fight for second with Beltoise until the Frenchman crashed on lap 16. At the same time Donohue pitted for new goggles but did not lose a place. This left a large gap between the first two and the rest. Peterson took the lead on lap 18 but on lap 31 Stewart took the lead back while they were going through backmarkers. A few moments later Peterson ran into Eaton's BRM and damaged the front of his car. This upset the balance of the car and Peterson was unable to match Stewart's pace and so the Tyrrell edged away to win by nearly 40 seconds. It was Stewart's sixth championship victory of the season. Donohue finished third on his F1 debut.

=== Round 11: United States ===
Another fortnight later, the championship moved to the newly revamped and redesigned Watkins Glen circuit in upstate New York. The circuit, originally 2.3 miles long, had been significantly upgraded, with a new pits and paddock complex and an additional mile of new track. Jackie Stewart took his sixth pole position of the year for Tyrrell, ahead of Emerson Fittipaldi, Denny Hulme, Clay Regazzoni, Francois Cevert, Jo Siffert, Jacky Ickx and Chris Amon. 29 drivers entered and started the race; Stewart took the lead from Hulme at the start with Cevert moving up to third place, followed by Regazzoni and Siffert. Fittipaldi made a poor start and was eighth. On the seventh lap Cevert was able to pass Hulme for second place and on lap 14 he moved ahead of Stewart, who was suffering from bad oversteer. Hulme was also having handling problems and he began to drop back, being overtaken by Ickx (who had passed Siffert). Stewart also fell victim to the Ferrari and then Siffert as well. Ickx stalked Cevert until lap 40 when the Ferrari began to fall back with an alternator problem which led to the Belgian's retirement. This moved Siffert to second place and Peterson (who had passed Stewart) to take third. Howden Ganley was fourth with Stewart fifth.

It was Cevert's first World Championship victory and with the Mexican Grand Prix having been cancelled due to crowd control problems the previous year, the United States Grand Prix was the last World Championship race of the 1971 season.

=== World Championship Victory Race ===
There was one more non-championship race to contend, the World Championship Victory Race at Brands Hatch, England, three weeks after the United States Grand Prix. The race lasted for less than half of its intended distance following a number of accidents. On lap 2, Henri Pescarolo and Reine Wisell collided at the Druids hairpin, with both cars retiring. Then Mike Hailwood and Ronnie Peterson also collided and had to pit for repairs. Hailwood's car was deemed unfit to continue, but Peterson rejoined the race, albeit nearly a lap down. Siffert had fallen several places at the start, but had made his way back to 4th by lap 14. Approaching the fast Hawthorn Bend at high speed on lap 15, his BRM suffered a mechanical failure which pitched it across the track into an earth bank. The car rolled over and caught fire, trapping him underneath, and he died from asphyxiation before he could be extricated. The race was stopped with the track blocked, and all the cars were stranded out on the circuit except for John Surtees, who was able to drive around to the pits, his car damaged by debris.

== Results and standings ==
=== Grands Prix ===
| Round | Grand Prix | Pole position | Fastest lap | Winning driver | Winning constructor | Tyre | Report |
|---|---|---|---|---|---|---|---|
| 1 | (South Africa) South African Grand Prix | (United Kingdom) Jackie Stewart | (United States) Mario Andretti | (United States) Mario Andretti | (Italy) Ferrari | F | Report |
| 2 | (Spain) Spanish Grand Prix | (Belgium) Jacky Ickx | (Belgium) Jacky Ickx | (United Kingdom) Jackie Stewart | (United Kingdom) Tyrrell-Ford | G | Report |
| 3 | Monaco Grand Prix | (United Kingdom) Jackie Stewart | (United Kingdom) Jackie Stewart | (United Kingdom) Jackie Stewart | (United Kingdom) Tyrrell-Ford | G | Report |
| 4 | (Netherlands) Dutch Grand Prix | (Belgium) Jacky Ickx | (Belgium) Jacky Ickx | (Belgium) Jacky Ickx | (Italy) Ferrari | F | Report |
| 5 | (France) French Grand Prix | (United Kingdom) Jackie Stewart | (United Kingdom) Jackie Stewart | (United Kingdom) Jackie Stewart | (United Kingdom) Tyrrell-Ford | G | Report |
| 6 | (United Kingdom) British Grand Prix | (Switzerland) Clay Regazzoni | (United Kingdom) Jackie Stewart | (United Kingdom) Jackie Stewart | (United Kingdom) Tyrrell-Ford | G | Report |
| 7 | (West Germany) German Grand Prix | (United Kingdom) Jackie Stewart | (France) François Cevert | (United Kingdom) Jackie Stewart | (United Kingdom) Tyrrell-Ford | G | Report |
| 8 | (Austria) Austrian Grand Prix | (Switzerland) Jo Siffert | (Switzerland) Jo Siffert | (Switzerland) Jo Siffert | (United Kingdom) BRM | F | Report |
| 9 | (Italy) Italian Grand Prix | (New Zealand) Chris Amon | (France) Henri Pescarolo | (United Kingdom) Peter Gethin | (United Kingdom) BRM | F | Report |
| 10 | (Canada) Canadian Grand Prix | (United Kingdom) Jackie Stewart | (New Zealand) Denny Hulme | (United Kingdom) Jackie Stewart | (United Kingdom) Tyrrell-Ford | G | Report |
| 11 | United States Grand Prix | (United Kingdom) Jackie Stewart | (Belgium) Jacky Ickx | (France) François Cevert | (United Kingdom) Tyrrell-Ford | G | Report |

=== Scoring system ===
Points were awarded to the top six classified finishers. The International Cup for F1 Manufacturers only counted the points of the highest-finishing driver for each race. For both the Championship and the Cup, the best five results from rounds 1-6 and the best four results from rounds 7-11 were counted.

Numbers without parentheses are championship points; numbers in parentheses are total points scored. Points were awarded in the following system:

| Position | 1st | 2nd | 3rd | 4th | 5th | 6th |
|---|---|---|---|---|---|---|
| Race | 9 | 6 | 4 | 3 | 2 | 1 |

=== World Drivers' Championship standings ===
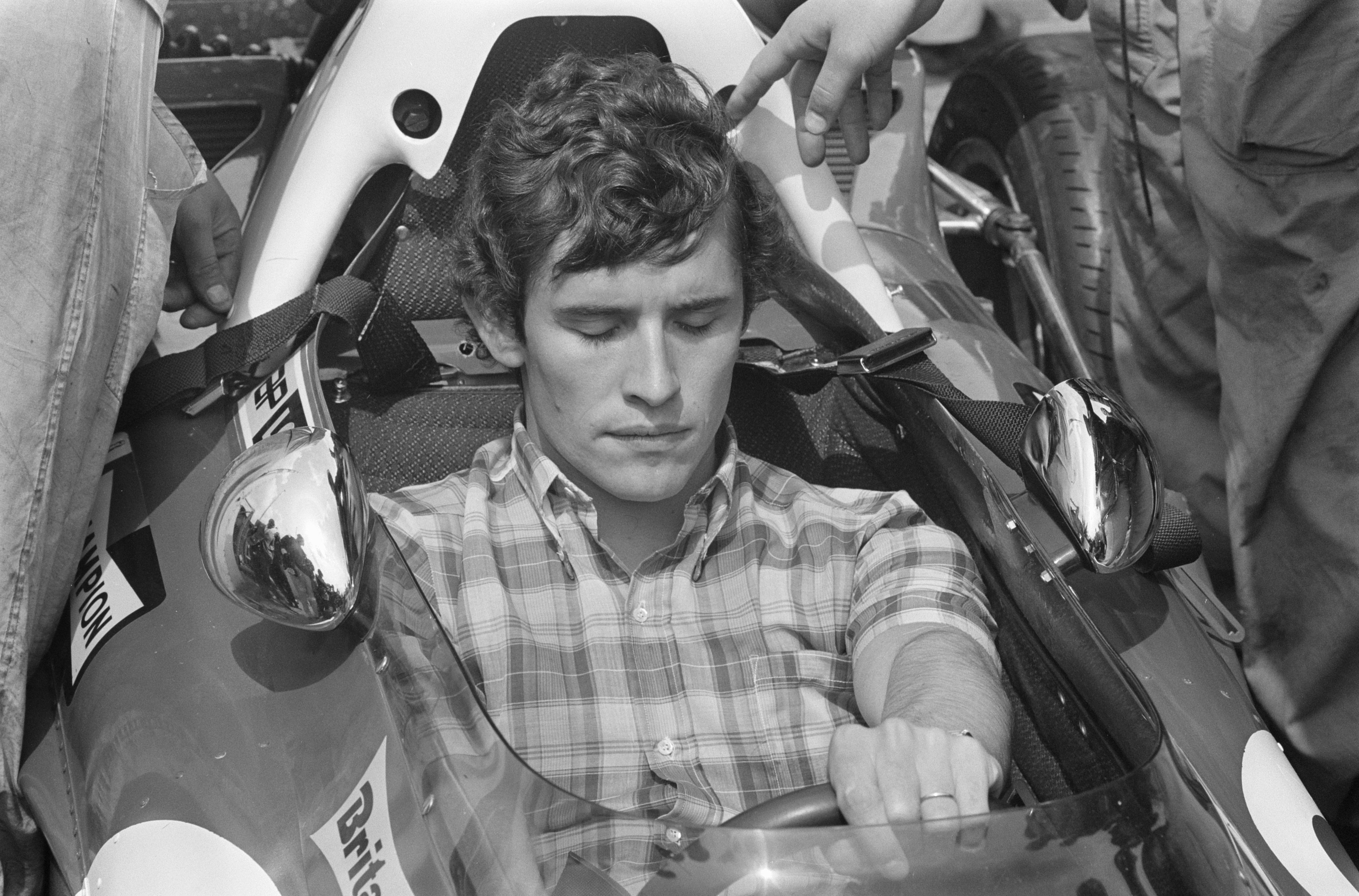
Jacky Ickx placed fourth in the championship driving for Ferrari

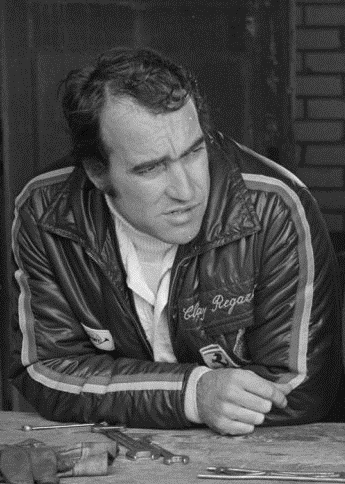
Clay Regazzoni placed seventh driving for Ferrari

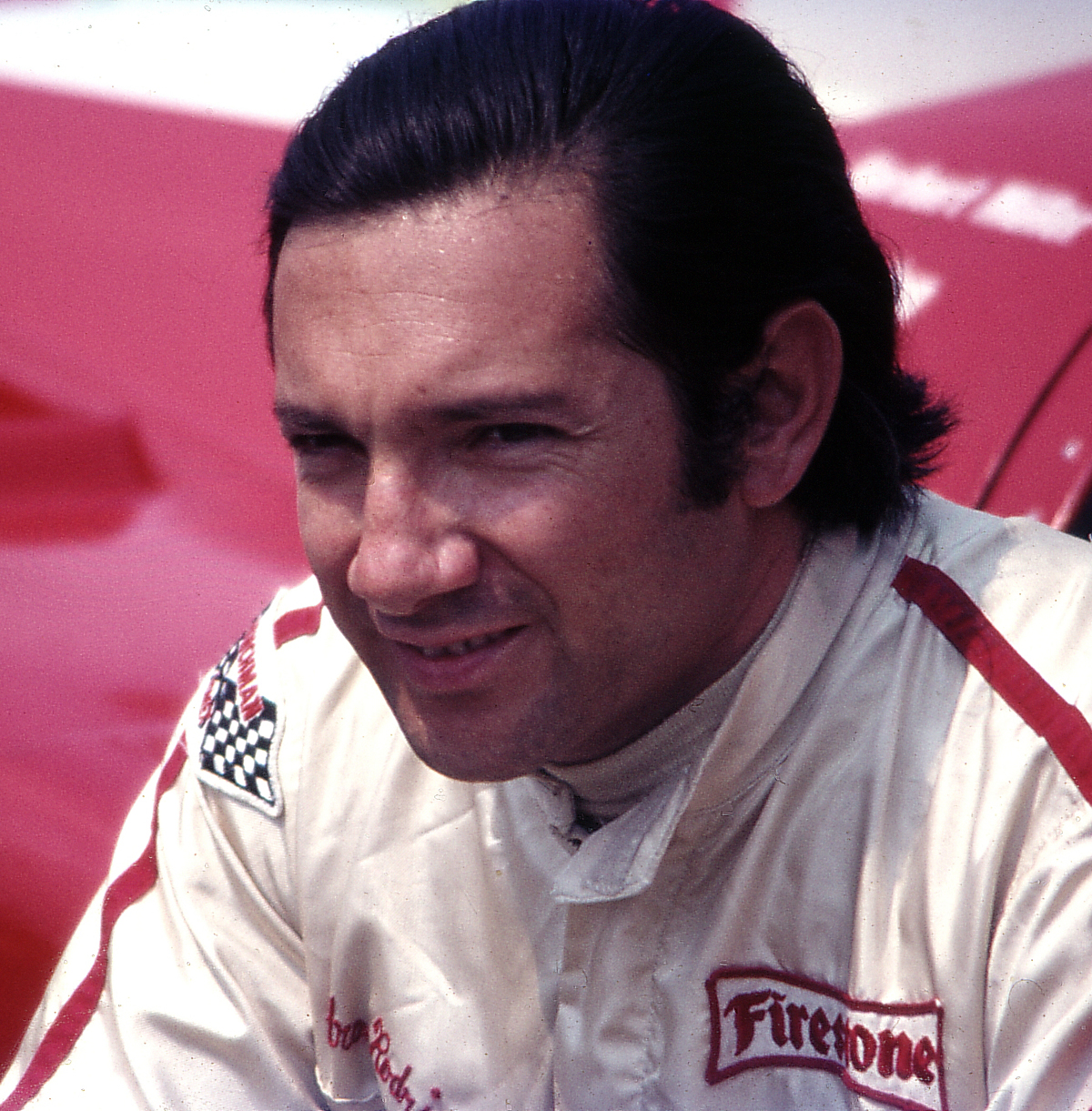
Pedro Rodríguez posthumously placed tenth driving for BRM

| Pos. | Driver | RSA (South Africa) | ESP (Spain) | MON (Monaco) | NED (Netherlands) | FRA (France) | GBR (United Kingdom) | GER (West Germany) | AUT (Austria) | ITA (Italy) | CAN (Canada) | USA (United States) | Pts. |
|---|---|---|---|---|---|---|---|---|---|---|---|---|---|
| 1 | (United Kingdom) Jackie Stewart | 2^{P} | 1 | 1^{P}^{F} | 11 | 1^{P}^{F} | 1^{F} | 1^{P} | Ret | Ret | 1^{P} | 5^{P} | 62 |
| 2 | (Sweden) Ronnie Peterson | 10 | Ret | 2 | 4 | Ret | 2 | 5 | 8 | 2 | 2 | 3 | 33 |
| 3 | (France) François Cevert | Ret | 7 | Ret | Ret | 2 | 10 | 2^{F} | Ret | 3 | 6 | 1 | 26 |
| 4 | (Belgium) Jacky Ickx | 8 | 2^{P}^{F} | 3 | 1^{P}^{F} | Ret | Ret | Ret | Ret | Ret | 8 | Ret^{F} | 19 |
| 5 | (Switzerland) Jo Siffert | Ret | Ret | Ret | 6 | 4 | 9 | DSQ | 1^{P}^{F} | 9 | 9 | 2 | 19 |
| 6 | (Brazil) Emerson Fittipaldi | Ret | Ret | 5 | | 3 | 3 | Ret | 2 | 8 | 7 | NC | 16 |
| 7 | (Switzerland) Clay Regazzoni | 3 | Ret | Ret | 3 | Ret | Ret^{P} | 3 | Ret | Ret | Ret | 6 | 13 |
| 8 | (United States) Mario Andretti | 1^{F} | Ret | DNQ | Ret | | | 4 | | | 13 | DNS | 12 |
| 9 | (United Kingdom) Peter Gethin | Ret | 8 | Ret | NC | 9 | Ret | Ret | 10 | 1 | 14 | 9 | 9 |
| 10 | (Mexico) Pedro Rodríguez | Ret | 4 | 9 | 2 | Ret | | | | | | | 9 |
| 11 | (New Zealand) Chris Amon | 5 | 3 | Ret | Ret | 5 | Ret | Ret | | 6^{P}^{F} | 10 | 12 | 9 |
| 12 | (Sweden) Reine Wisell | 4 | NC | Ret | DSQ | 6 | NC | 8 | 4 | | 5 | Ret | 9 |
| 13 | (New Zealand) Denny Hulme | 6 | 5 | 4 | 12 | Ret | Ret | Ret | Ret | | 4^{F} | Ret | 9 |
| 14 | (Australia) Tim Schenken | | 9 | 10 | Ret | 12 | 12 | 6 | 3 | Ret | Ret | Ret | 5 |
| 15 | (New Zealand) Howden Ganley | Ret | 10 | DNQ | 7 | 10 | 8 | Ret | Ret | 5 | DNS | 4 | 5 |
| 16 | (United States) Mark Donohue | | | | | | | | | | 3 | DNS | 4 |
| 17 | (France) Henri Pescarolo | 11 | Ret | 8 | NC | Ret | 4 | Ret | 6 | Ret^{F} | DNS | Ret | 4 |
| 18 | (United Kingdom) Mike Hailwood | | | | | | | | | 4 | | 15 | 3 |
| 19 | (United Kingdom) John Surtees | Ret | 11 | 7 | 5 | 8 | 6 | 7 | Ret | Ret | 11 | 17 | 3 |
| 20 | (West Germany) Rolf Stommelen | 12 | Ret | 6 | DSQ | 11 | 5 | 10 | 7 | DNS | Ret | | 3 |
| 21 | (United Kingdom) Graham Hill | 9 | Ret | Ret | 10 | Ret | Ret | 9 | 5 | Ret | Ret | 7 | 2 |
| 22 | (France) Jean-Pierre Beltoise | | 6 | Ret | 9 | 7 | 7 | | | | Ret | 8 | 1 |
| — | (United Kingdom) Jackie Oliver | | | | | | Ret | | 9 | 7 | | | 0 |
| — | (United Kingdom) Brian Redman | 7 | | | | | | | | | | | 0 |
| — | (Netherlands) Gijs van Lennep | | | | 8 | | | | | | | DNS | 0 |
| — | (Sweden) Jo Bonnier | Ret | | | | | | DNQ | DNS | 10 | | 16 | 0 |
| — | (United Kingdom) David Hobbs | | | | | | | | | | | 10 | 0 |
| — | (Italy) Nanni Galli | | | DNQ | Ret | DNS | 11 | 12 | 12 | Ret | 16 | Ret | 0 |
| — | (Austria) Helmut Marko | | | | | | | DNS | 11 | Ret | 12 | 13 | 0 |
| — | (Italy) Andrea de Adamich | 13 | Ret | | | Ret | NC | Ret | | Ret | | 11 | 0 |
| — | (United Kingdom) Vic Elford | | | | | | | 11 | | | | | 0 |
| — | (France) François Mazet | | | | | 13 | | | | | | | 0 |
| — | (Canada) John Cannon | | | | | | | | | | | 14 | 0 |
| — | (Canada) George Eaton | | | | | | | | | | 15 | | 0 |
| — | (United Kingdom) Mike Beuttler | | | | | | Ret | DSQ | NC | Ret | NC | | 0 |
| — | (United States) Skip Barber | | | DNQ | NC | | | | | | Ret | NC | 0 |
| — | (United States) Pete Lovely | | | | | | | | | | NC | NC | 0 |
| — | (France) Max Jean | | | | | NC | | | | | | | 0 |
| — | (France) Jean-Pierre Jarier | | | | | | | | | NC | | | 0 |
| — | (Spain) Alex Soler-Roig | Ret | Ret | DNQ | Ret | Ret | | | | | | | 0 |
| — | (South Africa) Dave Charlton | Ret | | | DNS | | Ret | | | | | | 0 |
| — | (United Kingdom) Chris Craft | | | | | | | | | | DNQ | Ret | 0 |
| — | (Rhodesia) John Love | Ret | | | | | | | | | | | 0 |
| — | (South Africa) Jackie Pretorius | Ret | | | | | | | | | | | 0 |
| — | (Australia) David Walker | | | | Ret | | | | | | | | 0 |
| — | (United Kingdom) Derek Bell | | | | | | Ret | | | | | | 0 |
| — | (Austria) Niki Lauda | | | | | | | | Ret | | | | 0 |
| — | (Switzerland) Silvio Moser | | | | | | | | | Ret | | | 0 |
| — | (United States) Sam Posey | | | | | | | | | | | Ret | 0 |
| — | (United States) Peter Revson | | | | | | | | | | | Ret | 0 |
| Pos. | Driver | RSA (South Africa) | ESP (Spain) | MON (Monaco) | NED (Netherlands) | FRA (France) | GBR (United Kingdom) | GER (West Germany) | AUT (Austria) | ITA (Italy) | CAN (Canada) | USA (United States) | Pts. |

Key
| Colour | Result |
|---|---|
| Gold | Winner |
| Silver | Second place |
| Bronze | Third place |
| Green | Other points position |
| Blue | Other classified position |
| Blue | Not classified, finished (NC) |
| Purple | Not classified, retired (Ret) |
| Red | Did not qualify (DNQ) |
| Black | Disqualified (DSQ) |
| White | Did not start (DNS) |
| White | Race cancelled (C) |
| Blank | Did not practice (DNP) |
| Blank | Excluded (EX) |
| Blank | Did not arrive (DNA) |
| Blank | Withdrawn (WD) |
| Blank | Did not enter (empty cell) |
| Annotation | Meaning |
| P | Pole position |
| F | Fastest lap |

=== International Cup for F1 Manufacturers standings ===
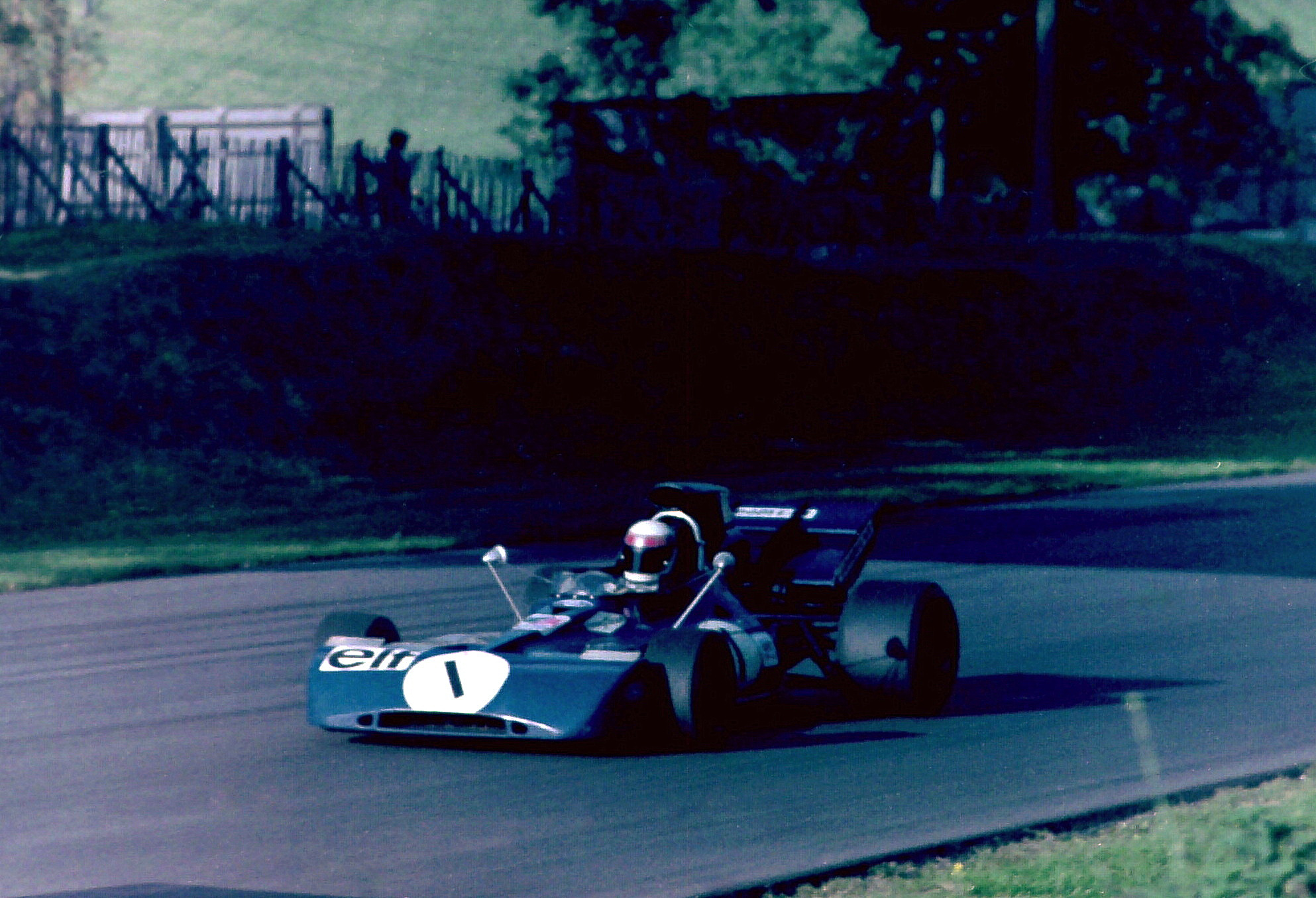
Tyrrell-Ford was awarded the International Cup for F1 Manufacturers. Tyrrell 003 is pictured above in the non-championship 1971 World Championship Victory Race at Brands Hatch

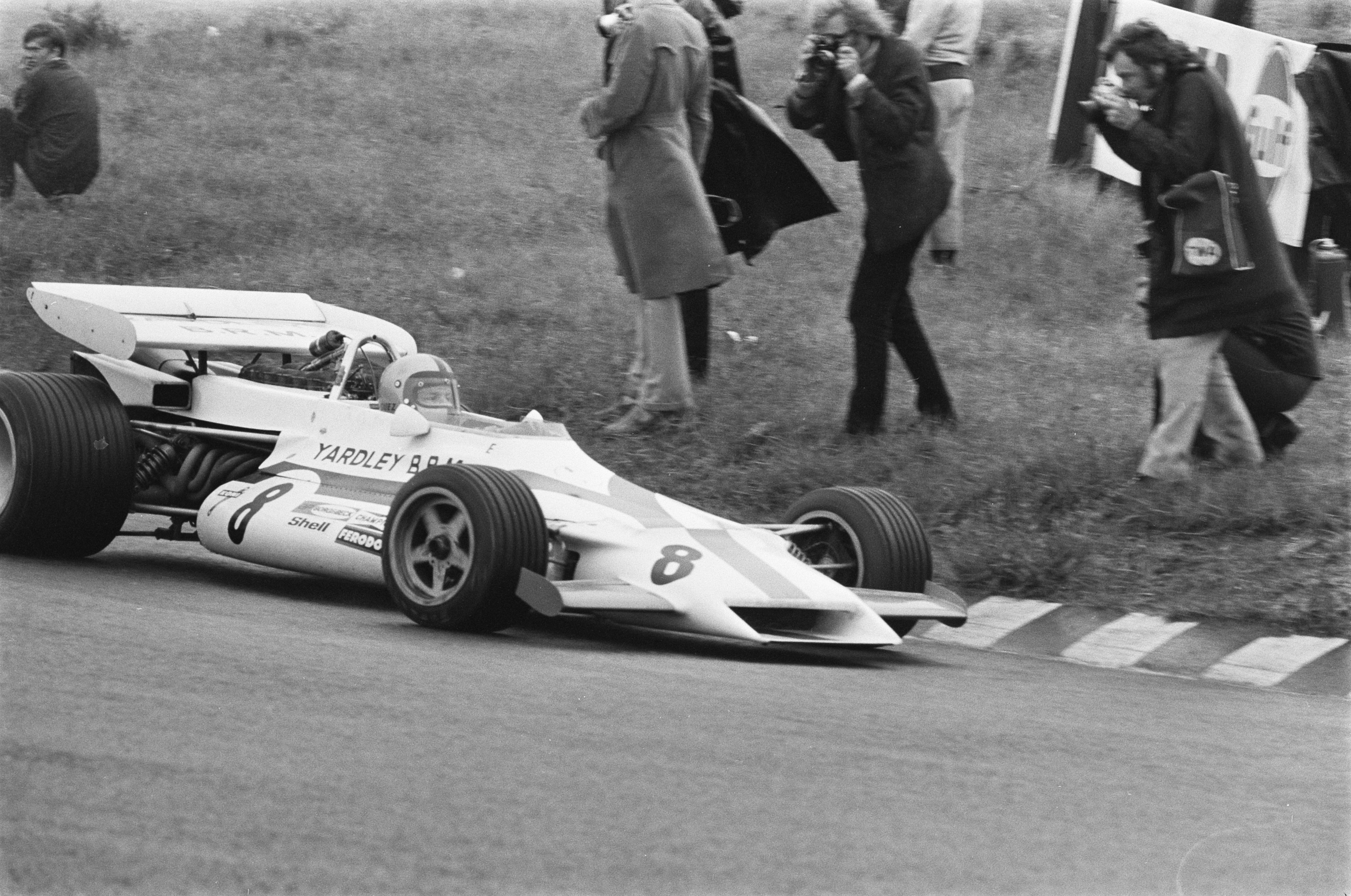
BRM placed second in the 1971 International Cup

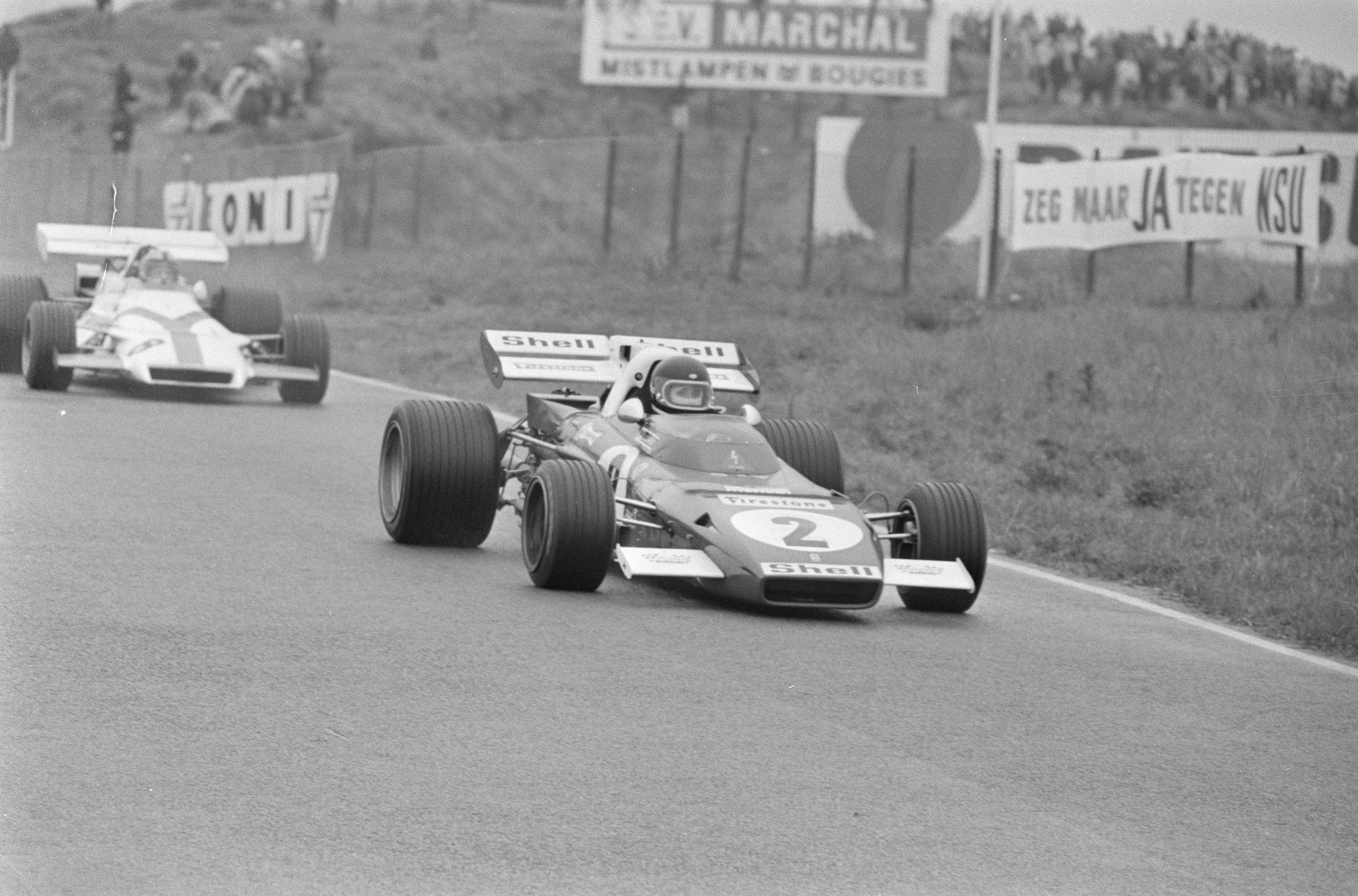
Ferrari placed third

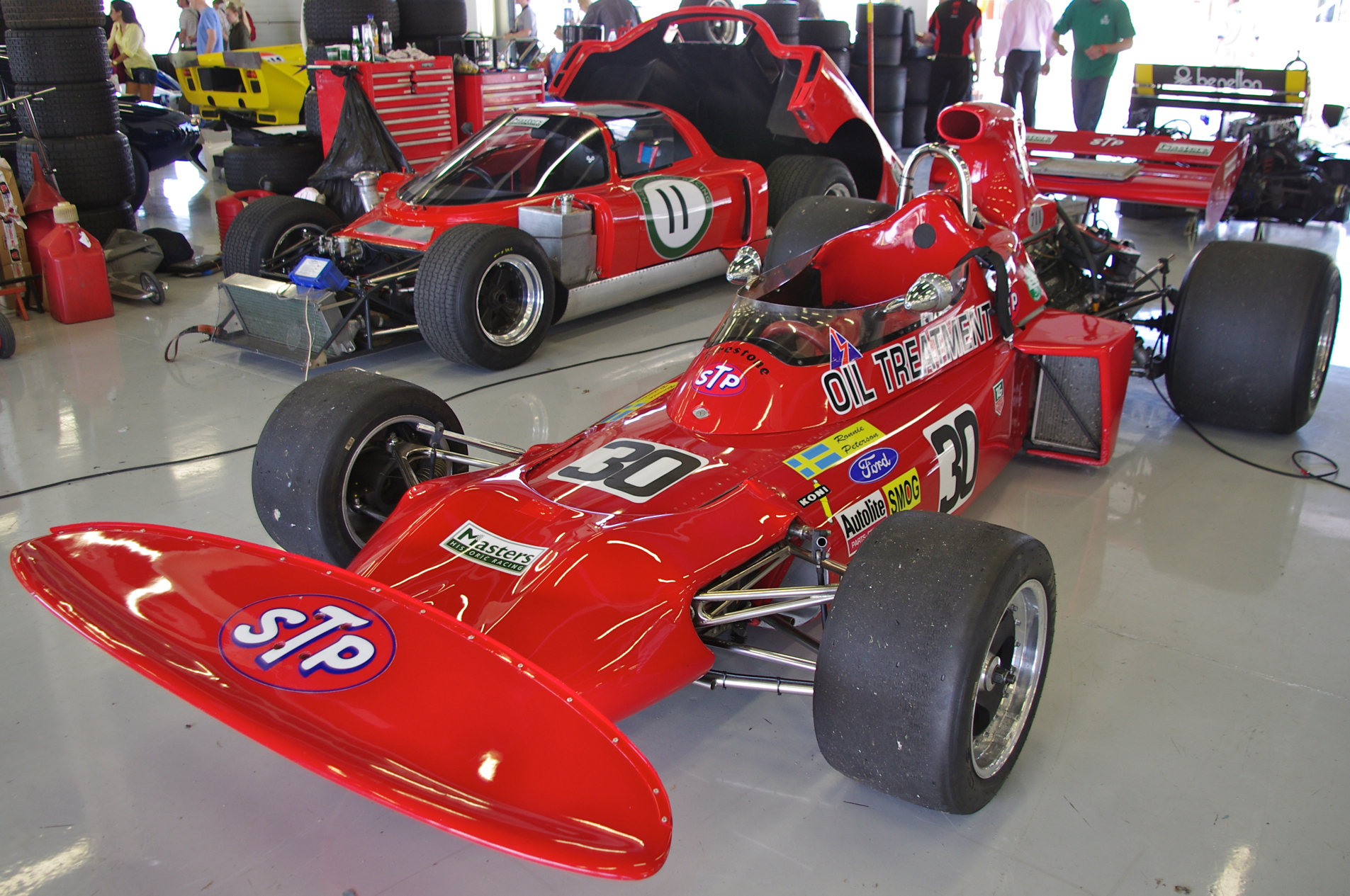
March-Ford placed fourth. The March 711 above is pictured in 2012

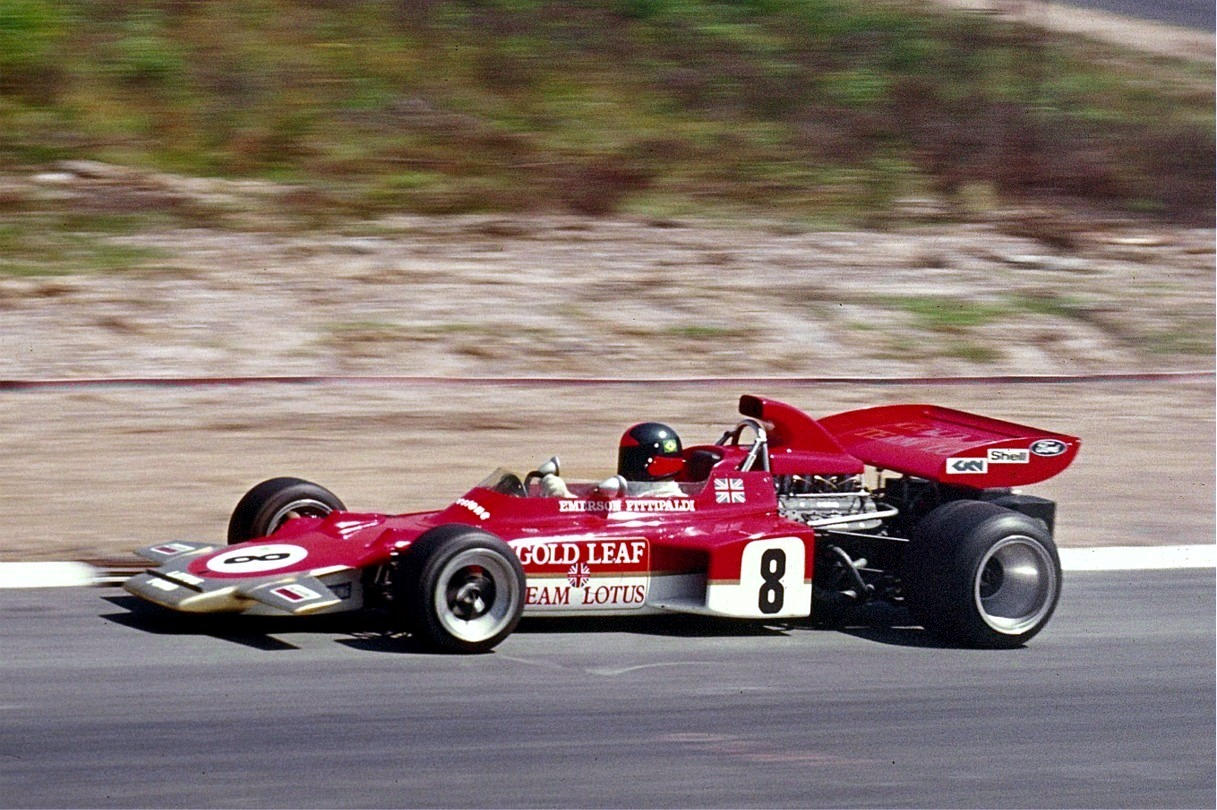
Lotus-Ford placed fifth

| Pos. | Manufacturer | RSA (South Africa) | ESP (Spain) | MON (Monaco) | NED (Netherlands) | FRA (France) | GBR (United Kingdom) | GER (West Germany) | AUT (Austria) | ITA (Italy) | CAN (Canada) | USA (United States) | Pts. |
|---|---|---|---|---|---|---|---|---|---|---|---|---|---|
| 1 | (United Kingdom) Tyrrell-Ford | 2 | 1 | 1 | 11 | 1 | 1 | 1 | Ret | 3 | 1 | 1 | 73 |
| 2 | (United Kingdom) BRM | Ret | 4 | 9 | 2 | 4 | 8 | 11 | 1 | 1 | 9 | 2 | 36 |
| 3 | (Italy) Ferrari | 1 | 2 | 3 | 1 | Ret | Ret | 3 | Ret | Ret | 8 | 6 | 33 |
| 4 | (United Kingdom) March-Ford | 10 | Ret | 2 | 4 | 13 | 2 | 5 | (6) | 2 | 2 | 3 | 33 (34) |
| 5 | (United Kingdom) Lotus-Ford | 4 | NC | 5 | DSQ | 3 | 3 | 8 | 2 | | 5 | NC | 21 |
| 6 | (United Kingdom) McLaren-Ford | 6 | 5 | 4 | 12 | 9 | Ret | Ret | 9 | 7 | 3 | 10 | 10 |
| 7 | (France) Matra | 5 | 3 | Ret | 9 | 5 | 7 | Ret | | 6 | 10 | 8 | 9 |
| 8 | (United Kingdom) Surtees-Ford | 7 | 11 | 6 | 5 | 8 | 5 | 7 | 7 | 4 | 11 | 15 | 8 |
| 9 | (United Kingdom) Brabham-Ford | 9 | 9 | 10 | 10 | 12 | 12 | 6 | 3 | Ret | Ret | 7 | 5 |
| — | (United Kingdom) Lotus-Pratt & Whitney | | | | Ret | | NC | | | 8 | | | 0 |
| — | (United Kingdom) March-Alfa Romeo | 13 | Ret | DNQ | Ret | Ret | NC | 12 | 12 | Ret | | 11 | 0 |
| — | (Switzerland) Bellasi-Ford | | | | | | | | | Ret | | | 0 |
| Pos. | Manufacturer | RSA (South Africa) | ESP (Spain) | MON (Monaco) | NED (Netherlands) | FRA (France) | GBR (United Kingdom) | GER (West Germany) | AUT (Austria) | ITA (Italy) | CAN (Canada) | USA (United States) | Pts. |

- Bold results counted towards final points totals.

== Non-championship races ==
A number of other Formula One races, which did not count towards the World Championship, were also held in 1971. The Questor Grand Prix and the last three British races were open to both Formula One and Formula 5000 cars.

| Race name | Circuit | Date | Winning driver | Constructor | Report |
|---|---|---|---|---|---|
| (Argentina) XIV Argentine Grand Prix | Buenos Aires | 24 January | (New Zealand) Chris Amon | (France) Matra | Report |
| (United Kingdom) VI Race of Champions | Brands Hatch | 21 March | (Switzerland) Clay Regazzoni | (Italy) Ferrari | Report |
| (United States) Questor Grand Prix | Ontario Motor Speedway | 28 March | (United States) Mario Andretti | (Italy) Ferrari | Report |
| (United Kingdom) XII Spring Trophy | Oulton Park | 9 April | (Mexico) Pedro Rodríguez | (United Kingdom) BRM | Report |
| (United Kingdom) XXIII BRDC International Trophy | Silverstone | 8 May | (United Kingdom) Graham Hill | (United Kingdom) Brabham-Cosworth | Report |
| (West Germany) Jochen Rindt Gedächtnisrennen | Hockenheim | 13 June | (Belgium) Jacky Ickx | (Italy) Ferrari | Report |
| (United Kingdom) XVIII International Gold Cup | Oulton Park | 22 August | (United Kingdom) John Surtees | (United Kingdom) Surtees-Cosworth | Report |
| (United Kingdom) I World Championship Victory Race | Brands Hatch | 24 October | (United Kingdom) Peter Gethin | (United Kingdom) BRM | Report |
