= McLaren M14A =

Formula One racing car

McLaren M14A McLaren M14D
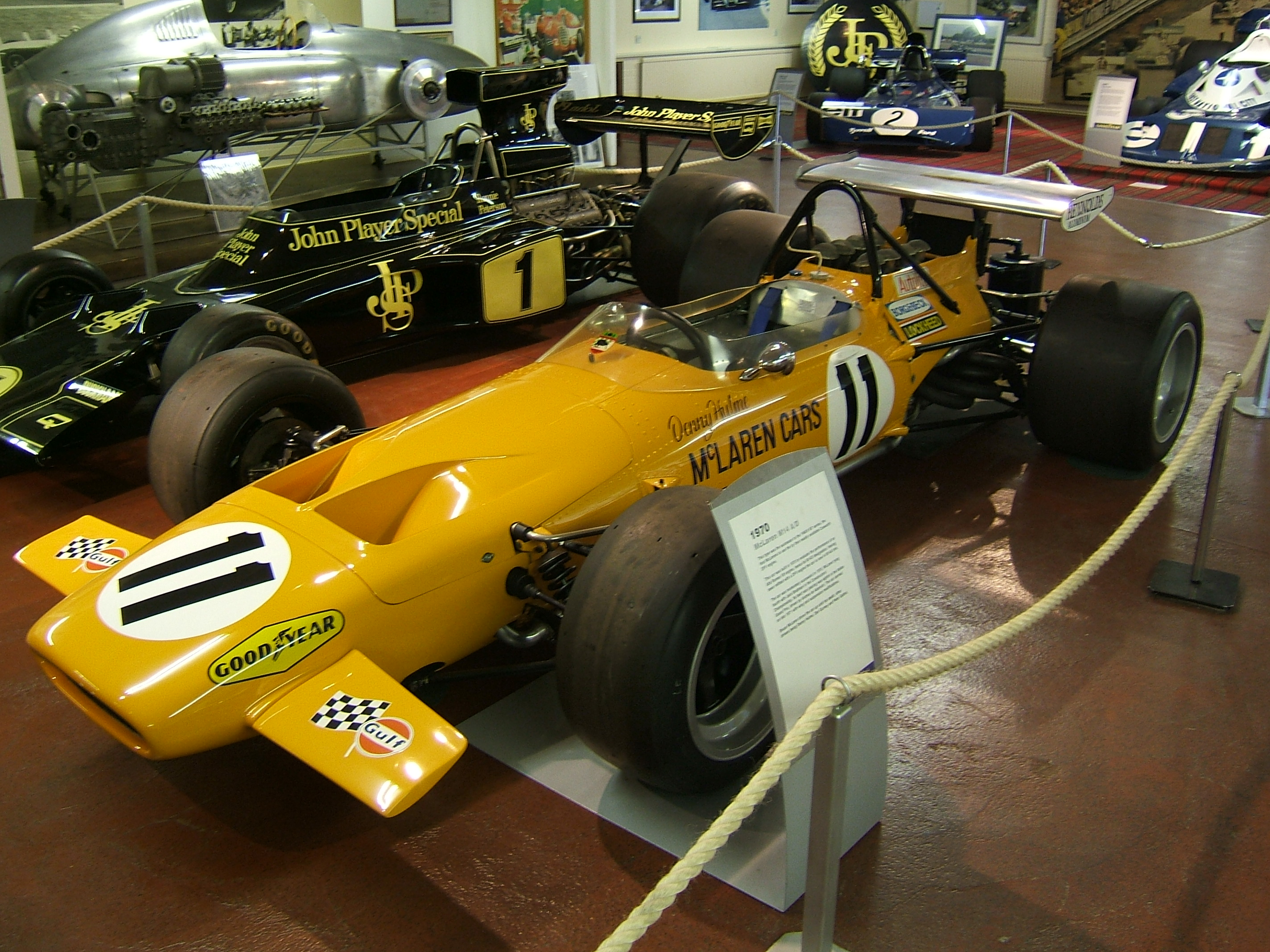
- An M14 housed at the Donington Grand Prix Exhibition.
- Category: Formula One
- Constructor: McLaren Racing
- Designer: Gordon Coppuck
- Predecessor: M7A / M9A
- Successor: M19A

Technical specifications
- Chassis: Aluminium monocoque.
- Suspension (front): Double wishbone.
- Suspension (rear): Double wishbone.
- Axle track: Front: 62.4 in (158 cm); Rear: 61.5 in (156 cm)
- Wheelbase: 94.8 in (241 cm)
- Engine: Ford-Cosworth DFV 2,993 cc (182.6 cu in) 90° V8, naturally aspirated, mid-mounted.
- Transmission: Hewland DG300 5-speed manual gearbox.
- Weight: 536 kg (1,182 lb)

Competition history
- Notable entrants: Bruce McLaren Motor Racing
- Notable drivers: (New Zealand) Denny Hulme (New Zealand) Bruce McLaren (United States) Dan Gurney
- Debut: 1970 South African Grand Prix
Races	Wins	Poles	F/Laps
18	0	0	0
- Unless otherwise stated, all data refer to Formula One World Championship Grands Prix only.

The McLaren M14A is a Formula One racing car built and raced by McLaren in the 1970 and 1971 World Championship. A later extension, the M14D featured an Alfa Romeo V8 engine.

== Design ==
=== M14A ===
The M14A was an evolution of the previous M7A and M7C, with the primary change being the rear brakes were mounted inboard instead of outboard. As with the M7, the M14A was powered by a Cosworth DFV V8 and a Hewland 5-speed manual gearbox.

=== M14D ===
Like the M7D, the M14D was commissioned by Alfa Romeo's Autodelta competition department. It was a standard M14A powered by the 3.0 litre V8 engine from Alfa Romeo's T33 sports car.

== Competition history ==
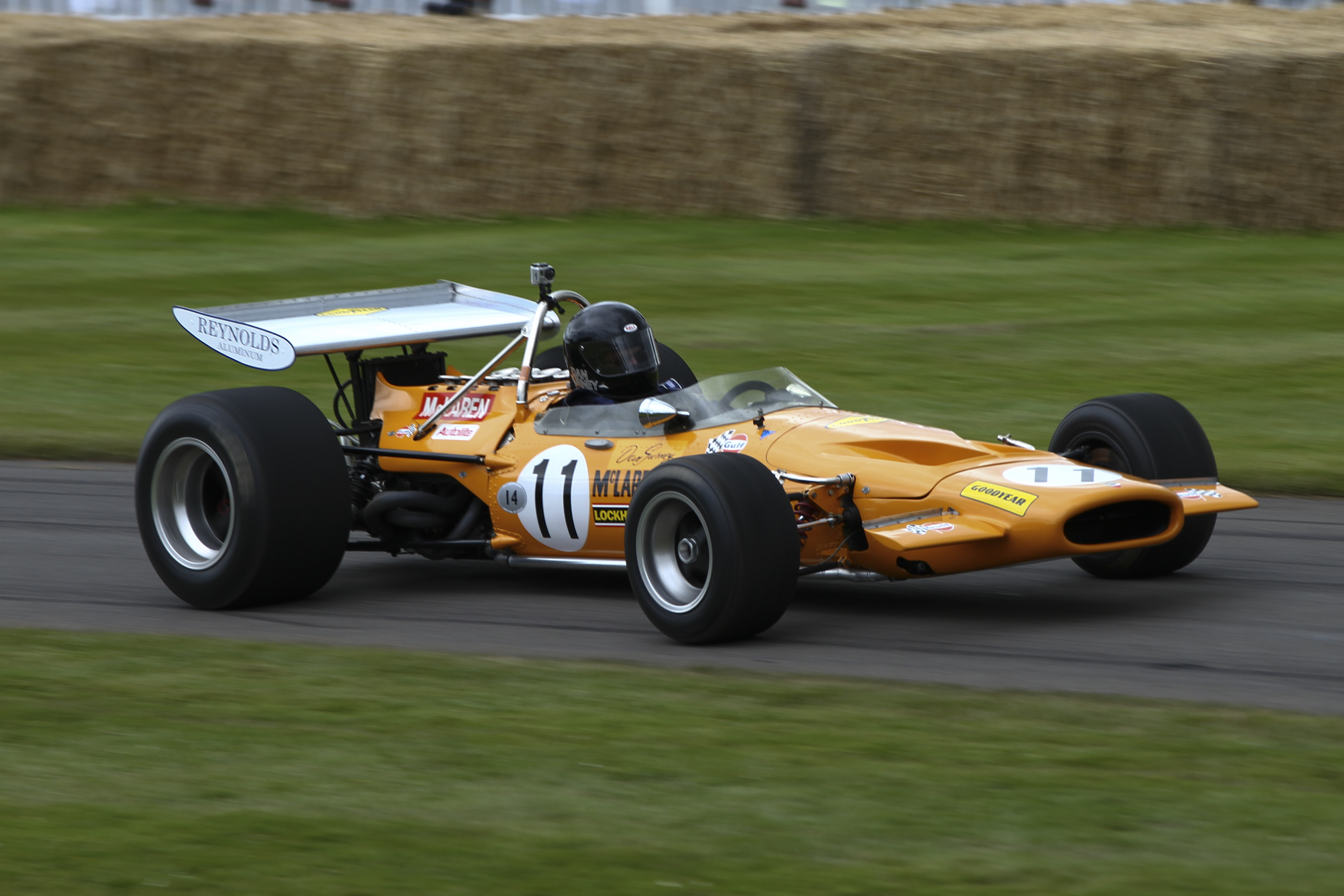
McLaren M14A at the 2012 Goodwood Festival of Speed

=== 1970 ===
The Formula 1 season started out with two second places, a fourth, and three retirements for Bruce McLaren and Denny Hulme. Bruce McLaren was killed on 2 June 1970 at the Goodwood Circuit while testing the new M8D Can-Am car. McLaren withdrew their entries to the Belgian Grand Prix, which was run five days after the fatal accident. Hulme had also been injured the month before in a methanol fire while practicing for the Indianapolis 500.

McLaren resumed racing at the Dutch Grand Prix, with Dan Gurney and Peter Gethin driving. Hulme came back for the next race in France, replacing Gethin. Gurney ran one more race, then was replaced by Gethin for the rest of the season. Hulme was able to score three third places, but McLaren finished fifth in the 1970 Constructor's Championship.

Andrea de Adamich began the season campaigning an Alfa Romeo powered M7D, then switched to the M14D, also Alfa Romeo powered, for the Dutch Grand Prix.

=== 1971 ===
Peter Gethin started the 1971 season driving a 14A, while Denny Hulme raced the only 19A that had been built at that point. Following two retirements and an eighth place at the Spanish Grand Prix, Gethin was also given a 19A to race. The 14A was brought out of retirement for Jackie Oliver to race, who finished with a retirement, a ninth, and a seventh place to cap off the career of the McLaren 14A.

== Complete Formula One World Championship results ==
(key) (results in bold indicate pole position; results in italics indicate fastest lap)

Year	Entrant	Chassis	Engine	Tyres	Drivers	1	2	3	4	5	6	7	8	9	10	11	12	13	Points	WCC
1970	Bruce McLaren Motor Racing	M14A	Ford Cosworth DFV	G		RSA	ESP	MON	BEL	NED	FRA	GBR	GER	AUT	ITA	CAN	USA	MEX	35	5th
1970	Bruce McLaren Motor Racing	M14A	Ford Cosworth DFV	G	(New Zealand) Bruce McLaren	Ret	2	Ret											35	5th
1970	Bruce McLaren Motor Racing	M14A	Ford Cosworth DFV	G	(United States) Dan Gurney					Ret	6	Ret							35	5th
1970	Bruce McLaren Motor Racing	M14A	Ford Cosworth DFV	G	(United Kingdom) Peter Gethin					Ret			Ret	10	Ret	6	14	Ret	35	5th
1970	Bruce McLaren Motor Racing	M14A	Ford Cosworth DFV	G	(New Zealand) Denny Hulme	2	Ret	4					3	Ret	4	Ret	7	3	35	5th
1970	Bruce McLaren Motor Racing	M14D	Ford Cosworth DFV	G	(New Zealand) Denny Hulme						4	3							35	5th
1970	Bruce McLaren Motor Racing	M14D	Alfa Romeo T33 V8	G	(Italy) Andrea de Adamich					DNQ			DNQ	12	8	Ret	DNQ		NC	0
1971	Bruce McLaren Motor Racing	M14A	Ford Cosworth DFV	G		RSA	ESP	MON	NED	FRA	GBR	GER	AUT	ITA	CAN	USA			10*	6th
1971	Bruce McLaren Motor Racing	M14A	Ford Cosworth DFV	G	(United Kingdom) Peter Gethin	Ret	8	Ret											10*	6th
1971	Bruce McLaren Motor Racing	M14A	Ford Cosworth DFV	G	(United Kingdom) Jackie Oliver						Ret		9	7					10*	6th

* All points in 1971 scored using the McLaren M19A
