= McLaren M19A =

Formula One racing car

McLaren M19A McLaren M19C McLaren M19D
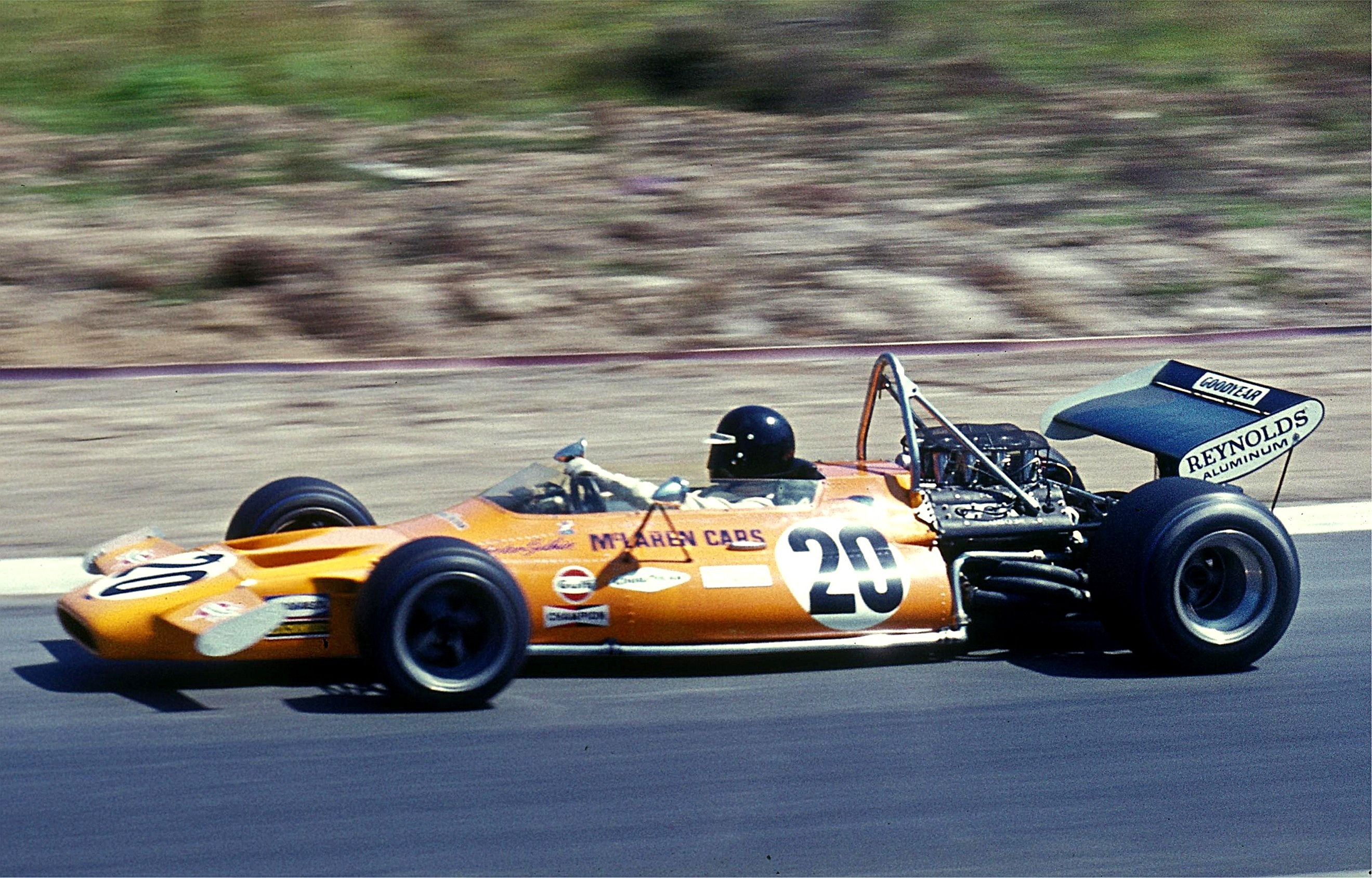
- Peter Gethin driving the M19A, during the 1971 German Grand Prix.
- Category: Formula One
- Constructor: McLaren Racing
- Designers: Ralph Bellamy; Ray Stokoe
- Predecessor: M14A
- Successor: M23

Technical specifications
- Chassis: Aluminium monocoque.
- Suspension (front): Double wishbone.
- Suspension (rear): Double wishbone.
- Axle track: Front: 63.0 in (160 cm); Rear: 62.0 in (157 cm)
- Wheelbase: 100 in (254 cm)
- Engine: Ford-Cosworth DFV 2,993 cc (182.6 cu in) 90° V8, naturally aspirated, mid-mounted.
- Transmission: Hewland DG400 5-speed manual gearbox.
- Weight: 560 kg (1,235 lb)

Competition history
- Notable entrants: Bruce McLaren Motor Racing; Penske-White Racing; Yardley Team McLaren
- Notable drivers: (New Zealand) Denny Hulme (United States) Peter Revson (South Africa) Jody Scheckter (United Kingdom) Brian Redman
- Debut: 1971 South African Grand Prix
Races	Wins	Podiums	Poles	F/Laps
25	1	13	1	3
- Unless otherwise stated, all data refer to Formula One World Championship Grands Prix only.

The McLaren M19A is a Formula One racing car built by McLaren in three World Championship seasons between 1971 and 1973.

== Design ==
With Gordon Coppuck preoccupied by designing the McLaren M16 Indianapolis 500 car, the task of designing an all-new Formula 1 car for 1971 fell on Ralph Bellamy. The result was a distinctive car that was nicknamed "The Alligator Car". The pear-shaped cockpit sides that led to this nickname were a result of placing two of the car's three 15 imp gal (68 L) fuel tanks alongside the driver.

The M19A used inboard coilover shocks for the front and rear suspension, which were actuated through a swinging link that gave an increasing spring rate as the springs were compressed. This linkage was dropped in favor of a conventional system with the M19C. The M19A and M19C both used a mid-mounted Cosworth DFV V8 and Hewland 5-speed manual gearbox.

== Competition history ==
=== 1971 ===
The McLaren M19A debuted at the 1971 South African Grand Prix with 1967 world champion Denny Hulme driving. Peter Gethin continued driving a McLaren M14A until a second M19A was built for the Dutch Grand Prix. Jackie Oliver took over driving the second McLaren for the Austrian Grand Prix after Gethin left to drive for BRM. Hulme scored the M19's first fastest lap at the Canadian Grand Prix, but a string of reliability issues had left McLaren placing only sixth in the Constructor's Championship.

The second car was sponsored by Penske-White Racing for the Canadian Grand Prix and United States Grand Prix. Mark Donohue made his Formula 1 debut in that car at Canada, finishing third. David Hobbs drove the car for the United States Grand Prix.

=== 1972 ===
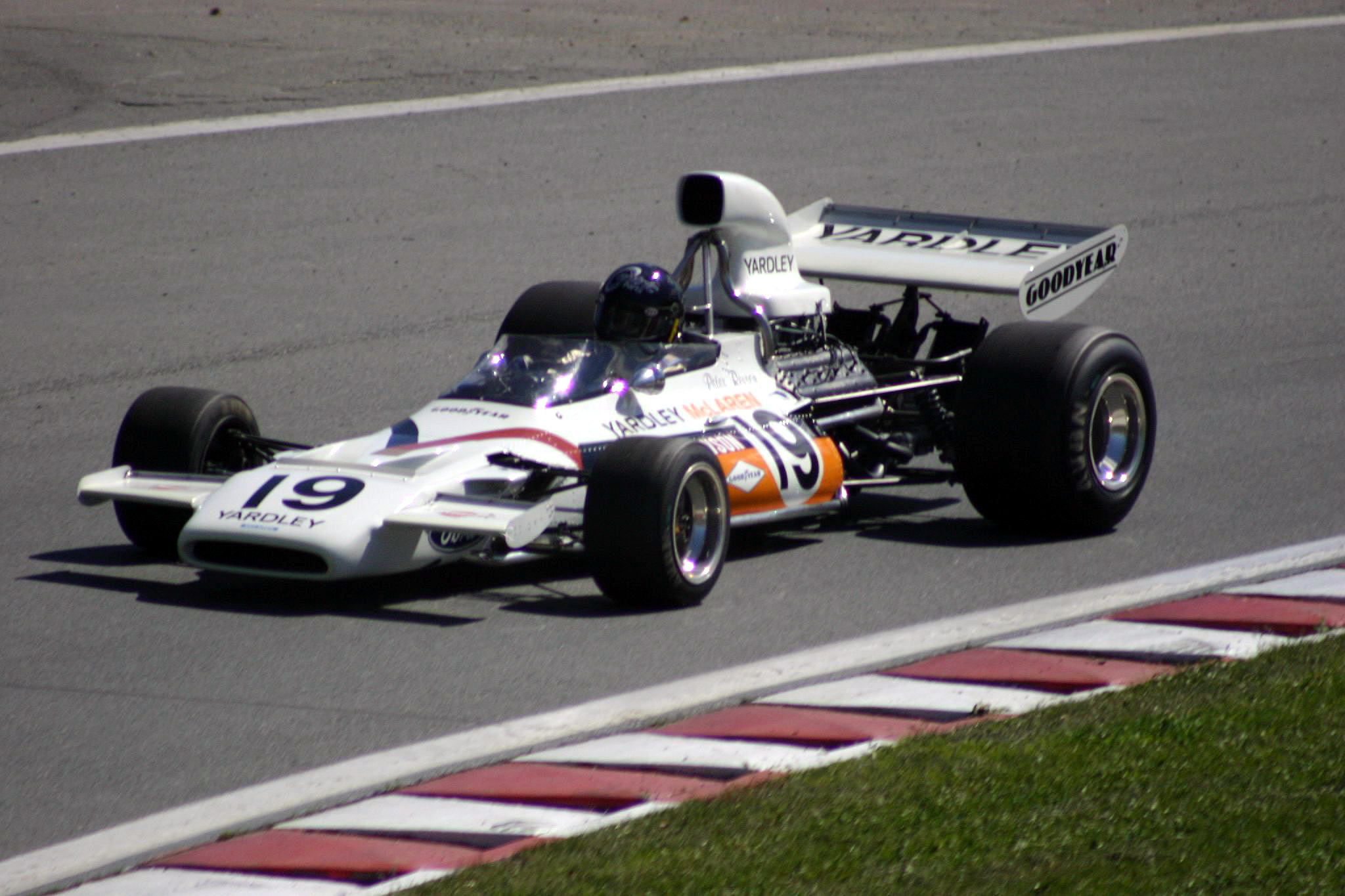
The McLaren M19C of Peter Revson on a demonstration run during the 2004 Canadian Grand Prix

McLaren gained a new sponsor for the 1972 Formula One season, the cosmetics and perfume company Yardley of London. The cars were repainted white to reflect this new sponsorship, with only the side fuel tanks continuing to be painted in the traditional McLaren orange.

The season began on a high note with Denny Hulme finishing the Argentine Grand Prix in second place, the first podium finish for a McLaren M19. Peter Revson made his McLaren debut in the second car. The next race proved even better, with both drivers on the podium and Hulme taking both his and McLaren's first win since the 1969 Mexican Grand Prix.

The modified M19C made its debut at Monaco in the hands of Denny Hulme, with Revson and Brian Redman continuing to use the M19A until the Austrian Grand Prix. Revson claimed pole position at the Canadian Grand Prix, McLaren's first ever pole position. Increased reliability over 1971 and a string of podium finishes secured third place in the 1972 Constructor's Championship for McLaren.

Future world champion Jody Scheckter made his Formula 1 debut in a M19A at the United States Grand Prix.

=== 1973 ===
McLaren began the 1973 Formula One season with both Denny Hulme and Peter Revson continuing to drive the M19C. Revson switched to a M19A for the Brazilian Grand Prix, then Hulme was given the new McLaren M23 for the South African Grand Prix. Hulme qualified the M23 on pole and finished fifth, with Revson and Jody Scheckter finishing in second and ninth place in the two M19C's, giving the M19 its 13th and final podium finish. This race would prove to be the last race for a McLaren M19.

== Complete Formula One World Championship results ==
(key) (results in bold indicate pole position; results in italics indicate fastest lap)

Year	Entrant	Engine	Tyres	Drivers	1	2	3	4	5	6	7	8	9	10	11	12	13	14	15	Points	WCC
1971	Bruce McLaren Motor Racing	Ford Cosworth DFV	G		RSA	ESP	MON	NED	FRA	GBR	GER	AUT	ITA	CAN	USA					**10***	6th
1971	Bruce McLaren Motor Racing	Ford Cosworth DFV	G	(New Zealand) Denny Hulme	6	5	4	12	Ret	Ret	Ret	Ret		4	Ret					**10***	6th
1971	Bruce McLaren Motor Racing	Ford Cosworth DFV	G	(United Kingdom) Peter Gethin				NC	9	Ret	Ret									**10***	6th
1971	Bruce McLaren Motor Racing	Ford Cosworth DFV	G	(United Kingdom) Jackie Oliver								9								**10***	6th
1971	Penske-White Racing	Ford Cosworth DFV	G	(United States) Mark Donohue										3	DNS					**10***	6th
1971	Penske-White Racing	Ford Cosworth DFV	G	(United Kingdom) David Hobbs											10					**10***	6th
1972	Yardley Team McLaren	Ford Cosworth DFV	G		ARG	RSA	ESP	MON	BEL	FRA	GBR	GER	AUT	ITA	CAN	USA				**47**	3rd
1972	Yardley Team McLaren	Ford Cosworth DFV	G	(New Zealand) Denny Hulme	2	1	Ret	15	3	7	5	Ret	2	3	3	3				**47**	3rd
1972	Yardley Team McLaren	Ford Cosworth DFV	G	(United States) Peter Revson	Ret	3	5		7		3		3	4	**2**	18				**47**	3rd
1972	Yardley Team McLaren	Ford Cosworth DFV	G	(United Kingdom) Brian Redman				5		9		5								**47**	3rd
1972	Yardley Team McLaren	Ford Cosworth DFV	G	(South Africa) Jody Scheckter												9				**47**	3rd
1973	Yardley Team McLaren	Ford Cosworth DFV	G		ARG	BRA	RSA	ESP	BEL	MON	SWE	FRA	GBR	NED	GER	AUT	ITA	CAN	USA	58**	3rd
1973	Yardley Team McLaren	Ford Cosworth DFV	G	(New Zealand) Denny Hulme	5	3														58**	3rd
1973	Yardley Team McLaren	Ford Cosworth DFV	G	(United States) Peter Revson	8	Ret	2													58**	3rd
1973	Yardley Team McLaren	Ford Cosworth DFV	G	(South Africa) Jody Scheckter			9													58**	3rd

** 36 points in 1973 scored using the McLaren M23
