= 2002 Historic Grand Prix of Monaco =

← Previous race	Next race →
- Circuit de Monaco

Race details
- Date: 18–19 May 2002
- Official name: 3e Grand Prix de Monaco Historique
- Location: Circuit de Monaco
- Course: Street circuit
- Course length: 3.370 km (2.094 miles)

The 2002 Historic Grand Prix of Monaco was the third running of the Historic Grand Prix of Monaco, a motor racing event for heritage Grand Prix, Voiturettes, Formula One, Formula Two and Sports cars.

== Report ==
The event was characterised by heavy rain during practice sessions on Saturday, resulting in some damaged cars, and dry races on Sunday.

Charles Dean overtook Julian Majzub at the start of Race A, and the two raced hard until Majzub hit the wall at St Devote, slightly injuring himself and damaging the car enough to end his race. Bart Rosman ran third but engine problems forced him to retire after 7 laps.

Race C featured Simone Stanguellini, grandson of Stanguellini founder Vittorio, at the wheel of a Stanguellini Spyder 750. He would return to the event in 2004 and 2008 driving a Formula Junior car from the marque owned by his family. Phil Hill was entered in an Alfa Romeo 3000 CM but did not take part in any sessions; he would return with the same car in 2004. Stirling Moss gave a spirited drive to twelfth, which the crowd acknowledged with a standing ovation after the finish. Richard Wills qualified third but crashed in the tunnel and was a non-starter.

Duncan Dayton led Race E for 6 laps before retiring, and led Race F but retired early with a damaged suspension.

Race G featured, for the only time in the event's history, two current F1 drivers: Alex Yoong and Takuma Sato, both seeking to gain experience of the unique circuit before their first Monaco Grand Prix. Sato crashed his Lotus 49B during a wet practice session and did not start the race; Yoong took the race lead and seemed destined for victory until his car became stuck in fifth gear during a late safety car period and Martin Stretton passed him on the final lap.

Three more F1 drivers were slated to take part: Henri Pescarolo in a Matra MS120 similar to that which he'd driven to third place in the 1970 Monaco Grand Prix, Tom Belsø in a Williams FW03 similar to his car from the 1974 Formula One season, and Danny Sullivan in a Lola Mk4. Neither would feature in the event; Sullivan's car was driven by American Howard Cherry.

== Results ==
=== Summary ===
Série	Cars	Years	Pole position		Fastest lap		Race winner
A	Grand Prix - two-seater	Pre-1934	(United Kingdom) Julian Majzub	2:16.954	(United Kingdom) Charles Dean	2:12.239	(United Kingdom) Charles Dean
B	Grand Prix	Pre-1952	(United Kingdom) Julian Bronson	2:32.581	(United Kingdom) Irvine Laidlaw	2:08.124	(United Kingdom) Julian Bronson
C	Sports cars	Pre-1959	(United Kingdom) David Franklin	2:16.987	(United Kingdom) Irvine Laidlaw	2:09.026	(United Kingdom) David Franklin
D	Grand Prix	Pre-1961	(France) Flavien Marcais	2:22.989	(United States) Duncan Dayton	2:00.511	(United Kingdom) Martin Stretton
E	Formula Junior - rear engine		(United Kingdom) Denis Welch	2:05.354	(United Kingdom) Denis Welch	1:56.997	(United Kingdom) Denis Welch
F	Grand Prix	Pre-1966	(Germany) Dr. Thomas Bscher	2:26.534	(United Kingdom) Frank Sytner	1:56.103	(United Kingdom) Frank Sytner
G	Formula 1	Pre-1979	(France) Flavien Marcais	2:08.863	(United Kingdom) Trevor Reeves	1:44.182	(United Kingdom) Martin Stretton

=== Série A: Pre 1934 two-seater Grand Prix cars ===
Pos.	No.	Driver	Car	Year	Laps	Time/retired	Grid
1	6	(United Kingdom) Charles Dean	Bugatti 51	1932	10	24:00.504	2
2	11	(Germany) Fritz Grashei	Alfa Romeo 8C Monza	1933	10	+43.177	
3	7	(France) Jean-Louis Duret	Bugatti 35B	1926	10	+1:05.355	
4	24	(Germany) Klaus Werner	Alfa Romeo 8C Monza	1932	10	+1:24.859	
5	4	(United Kingdom) Chris Chilcott	Frazer Nash Supersports	1926	10	+1:58.359	
6	30	(United Kingdom) Philip Champion	Frazer Nash Supersports	1928	9	+1 lap	
7	8	(United Kingdom) Peter S. Flood	Riley Dixon 6	1933	9	+1 lap	
8	23	(Germany) Martin Viessmann	Alfa Romeo 8C Monza	1933	9	+1 lap	
9	9	(Belgium) Paul Grant	Amilcar C0	1927	9	+1 lap	
10	2	(Monaco) Jean-Claude Miloe	Delage 1500	1927	9	+1 lap	
11	25	(Germany) Michael Willms	Bugatti 35A	1926	9	+1 lap	
12	15	(United States) Ian Landy	Bugatti 35B	1927	8	+2 laps	
13	19	(Germany) Helmut Pende	Bugatti 37A	1928	8	+2 laps	
14	3	(United Kingdom) Martin Henderson	Frazer Nash Nūrburg	1932	8	+2 laps	
15	10	(United Kingdom) Mary Grant-Jonkers	Amilcar C6	1927	8	+2 laps	
16	14	(Netherlands) Bart Rosman	Bugatti 35C	1929	7	+3 laps	4
17	17	(United Kingdom) Richard Odell	Riley S.W.B. 11/40	1924	7	+3 laps	
18	1	(United Kingdom) Julian Majzub	Bugatti 35B	1927	4	+6 laps	1
19	21	(France) Jean-Jacques Strub	Bugatti 35/51	1926	4	+6 laps	
20	34	(Germany) Axel Wulfing	Mercedes-Benz SSK	1928	4	+6 laps	
21	18	(United Kingdom) Peter Neumark	Alfa Romeo 8C Monza	1932	2	+8 laps	
22	5	(United States) Ed Davies	Alfa Romeo 8C Monza	1932	1	+9 laps	3
No lap	20	(United Kingdom) Dick Smith	Frazer Nash Nūrburg	1932			
DNS	12	(Brazil) Abba Kogan	Maserati 8C	1933			
DNS	16	(Switzerland) Franz Messerli	Maserati 4CM	1932			

=== Série B: Pre 1952 Grand Prix cars ===
Pos.	No.	Driver	Car	Year	Laps	Time/retired	Grid
1	3	(United Kingdom) Julian Bronson	ERA B	1937	10	21:44.015	1
2	1	(United Kingdom) Irvine Laidlaw	Maserati 6CM	1937	10	+5.815	
3	4	(United Kingdom) Martin Walford	ERA R1A	1934	10	+13.115	3
4	21	(United Kingdom) Mark Gillies	Maserati 4CL	1939	10	+47.658	
5	23	(United Kingdom) Richard Pilkington	Talbot-Lago T26C	1950	10	+50.837	
6	19	(United Kingdom) Antony Stephens	ERA R12B	1936	10	+56.845	
7	24	(United States) Christopher W. Cox	Ferrari 212	1951	10	+1:53.886	
8	17	(United Kingdom) Roger Lucas	Maserati 6CM	1936	10	+2:15.071	
9	18	(United Kingdom) John May	Maserati A6GCM	1951	10	+2:16.641	
10	7	(United States) Jeff Kline	Alfa Romeo 12C	1937	9	+1 lap	
11	9	(United Kingdom) Richard Last	MG Parnell K3	1933	9	+1 lap	
12	15	(United States) Patrick van Schoote	Alfa Romeo P3	1934	9	+1 lap	
13	22	(Switzerland) Max Lustenberger	Maserati 4CLT	1948	9	+1 lap	
14	2	(France) Jean-Jacques Bally	Gordini T15	1948	9	+1 lap	
15	44	(Austria) Wolf-Dieter Baumann	Maserati 4CLT	1949	9	+1 lap	
16	14	(Germany) Robert Fink	Alfa Romeo P3	1932	8	+2 laps	
No lap	6	(Switzerland) Georg Kaufmann	Maserati 4CL	1939			
No lap	10	(Germany) Oliver Maierhofer	Maserati 4CL	1946			
No lap	11	(Austria) Winfried Kallinger	Cisitalia D46	1946			
No lap	12	(Germany) Stefan Schollwoeck	Maserati 6CM	1937			2
DNS	16	(Switzerland) Peter Heuberger	Maserati 6CM	1938			
DNS	20	(Germany) Wolfgang Wegner-Bscher	Maserati V8RI	1936			

=== Série C: Pre 1959 Sports cars ===
Pos.	No.	Driver	Car	Year	Laps	Time/retired	Grid
1	26	(United Kingdom) David Franklin	Ferrari 750 Monza	1955	10	22:21.604	1
2	21	(United Kingdom) Irvine Laidlaw	Maserati 250S	1957	10	+15.359	4
3	37	(United States) Rob Walton	Maserati 300S	1956	10	+31.07	
4	32	(United Kingdom) Michael Steele	HWM-Jaguar	1954	10	+31.723	
5	25	(Brazil) Carlos Monteverde	Ferrari 250 TR	1958	10	+32.211	
6	7	(France) Pierre Rageys	Maserati 300S	1955	10	+38.197	
7	35	(Switzerland) Christian Traber	Ferrari 750 Monza	1955	10	+1:18.049	
8	42	(Mexico) Nicolas Zapata	Ferrari 625 TR	1956	10	+1:52.464	
9	10	(United Kingdom) James Wood	HWM-Jaguar	1956	10	+1:53.919	
10	38	(United Kingdom) Nick Wigley	Tojeiro-Bristol	1953	10	+2:00.368	
11	8	(Japan) Shunji Hasumi	Lotus Nine	1955	10	+2:13.231	
12	34	(United Kingdom) Stirling Moss	Frazer Nash Le Mans Replica	1953	9	+1 lap	
13	15	(Germany) Wolfgang Friedrichs	Aston Martin DB3	1952	9	+1 lap	
14	31	(Italy) Simone Stanguellini	Stanguellini Spyder 750	1953	9	+1 lap	21
15	29	(Germany) Paul Singer	Veritas RS	1948	9	+1 lap	
16	3	(France) Jean-François Bentz	Cooper-Bristol Mk1	1952	9	+1 lap	
17	16	(Italy) Tommaso Gelmini	OSCA MT4	1955	9	+1 lap	
18	5	(United Kingdom) Julian Bronson	Jaguar C-Type	1952	9	+1 lap	
19	27	(Italy) Marco Pelizziari	Ferrari 500 TR	1956	9	+1 lap	
20	23	(United States) Bruce McCaw	Maserati 450S	1957	9	+1 lap	
21	11	(Spain) Carlos de Miguel	Ferrari 166 MM	1950	9	+1 lap	
22	17	(United Kingdom) Neil Hadfield	Jaguar C-Type	1953	9	+1 lap	
23	22	(France) Patrice Louette	HWM-Alta	1948	9	+1 lap	
24	6	(Italy) Umberto Camellini	Ferrari 340 MM	1953	9	+1 lap	
25	20	(United Kingdom) Fritz Kozka	Porsche 550 A	1957	9	+1 lap	
26	14	(Spain) Jose Fernandez	Frazer Nash Le Mans Replica	1950	9	+1 lap	
27	4	(France) Antoine Blasco	OSCA MT4	1952	9	+1 lap	
28	24	(France) Antoine Midy	Ferrari 212 Export	1951	8	+2 laps	
29	28	(France) Pierre Pinelli	Lotus Nine	1955	8	+2 laps	
30	18	(United States) Allan Rosenberg	OSCA 2000S	1952/53	8	+2 laps	
31	1	(United Kingdom) Jeremy Agace	Maserati 250SI	1956	7	+3 laps	2
32	40	(Germany) Peter Wuensch	Maserati 300S	1955	3	+7 laps	
33	33	(United Kingdom) Frank Sytner	Aston Martin DB3S	1955	2	+8 laps	
No lap	30	(Monaco) Raymond Squarciafichi	Arnolt-Bristol	1957			
No lap	9	(Italy) Roberto Crippa	Ferrari 340 MM	1953			
DNS	39	(United Kingdom) Richard Wills	Lola Mk1	1957/8			3
DNS	2	(United States) Phil Hill	Alfa Romeo 6C 3000 CM	1953			
DNS	19	(Brazil) Abba Kogan	Maserati 350S	1956			

=== Série D: Pre 1961 Grand Prix cars ===
Pos.	No.	Driver	Car	Year	Laps	Time/retired	Grid
1	1	(United Kingdom) Martin Stretton	Connaught C	1956	10	21:22.114	2
2	3	(United States) Duncan Dayton	Lotus 16	1959	10	+13.323	
3	15	(France) Flavien Marcais	Cooper-Bristol Mk2	1953	10	+16.286	1
4	14	(United Kingdom) Willie Green	Maserati 250F	1957	10	+20.547	
5	34	(Germany) Dr. Thomas Bscher	Maserati 250F	1955	10	+31.529	3
6	19	(United Kingdom) Barrie Williams	Connaught A4	1952	10	+37.257	
7	9	(United Kingdom) Ian Nuthall	Alta	1952	10	+1:45.634	
8	4	(Italy) Gigi Baulino	Maserati A6GCM-250F	1952/54	10	+2:03.398	
9	28	(Switzerland) Peter Heuberger	Maserati 250F	1956	10	+2:16.603	
10	6	(United Kingdom) Barry Cannell	Cooper-Bristol Mk2	1953	9	+1 lap	
11	7	(United Kingdom) Proby Cautley	Cooper-Bristol Mk1	1952	9	+1 lap	
12	16	(United Kingdom) Michael Parr	Cooper T24/25	1953	9	+1 lap	
13	48	(Spain) Juan Quintano	Ferrari 555 "Supersqualo"	1955	9	+1 lap	
14	8	(United Kingdom) Peter Gooch	Lotus 12	1958	9	+1 lap	
15	5	(United Kingdom) David Bennett	Maserati A6GCM-250F	1953/54	6	+4 laps	
16	11	(Sweden) Lars-Goran Itskowitz	Lotus 12	1957	5	+5 laps	
No lap	2	(Spain) Joaquín Folch-Rusiñol	Lotus 16	1959			
DNS	10		Ferrari 212	1951			
DNS	12	(United Kingdom) Neil Davies	Cooper-Alta	1952			
DNS	14	(United Kingdom) Peter Neumark	Maserati 250F	1957			
DNS	17	(United States) Tom Price	Maserati 250F	1956			
DNS	18	(Germany) Dieter Streve-Mühlens	Maserati 250F	1954			

=== Série E: Formula Junior - Rear engine ===
Pos.	No.	Driver	Car	Year	Laps	Time/retired	Grid
1	29	(United Kingdom) Denis Welch	Merlyn	1963	10	20:51.771	1
2	31	(United Kingdom) Michael Schryver	Lotus 22	1962	10	+1.003	
3	2	(Spain) Joaquín Folch-Rusiñol	Lotus 27	1963	10	+49.656	
4	3	(Monaco) Marcus Mussa	Lotus 22	1962	10	+1:06.724	
5	24	(United States) Douglas Mockett	Cooper T56	1961	10	+1:07.273	
6	6	(United Kingdom) Bob Birrell	Brabham BT6	1963	10	+2:04.582	
7	27	(Italy) Dario Tellarini	Foglietti	1963	10	+2:06.290	
8	90	(United Kingdom) James Hicks	Caravelle Mk3	1960	9	+1 lap	
9	14	(United Kingdom) Simon Diffey	Lotus 20	1961	9	+1 lap	
10	1	(Japan) Keiichi Murakami	Lotus 18	1960	9	+1 lap	
11	21	(Germany) Klaus Rauschen	Brabham BT2	1962	9	+1 lap	
12	4	(United Kingdom) Oliver Crosthwaite	Gemini Mk4	1962	9	+1 lap	
13	25	(United Kingdom) David Stevenson	Cooper T56	1960	9	+1 lap	
14	20	(Italy) Luciano Quaggia	Brabham BT6	1963	9	+1 lap	
15	7	(New Zealand) Leonard Selby	Cooper T56	1961	9	+1 lap	
16	9	(Italy) Marco Antonucci	Wainer	1963	9	+1 lap	
17	26	(United Kingdom) Andrew Taylor	Britannia	1960	9	+1 lap	
18	57	(United Kingdom) Robin Longdon	Lola Mk5A	1963	8	+2 laps	
19	12	(United States) Kurt DelBene	Lola Mk5A	1963	8	+2 laps	
20	28	(United Kingdom) Michael Waller	Kieft	1960	8	+2 laps	
21	30	(Italy) Carlo Maria del Conte	Wainer	1960	8	+2 laps	
22	5	(United States) Duncan Dayton	Cooper T67	1963	7	+3 laps	
23	23	(Australia) Gary Michael Ryan	Lola Mk3	1961	7	+3 laps	
24	8	(Germany) Tobias Aichele	Melkus-Wartburg	1960	4	+6 laps	
25	17	(Germany) Peter Knöfel	Emeryson F1	1960	3	+7 laps	
26	18	(United Kingdom) John Monson	Elva 300	1961	2	+8 laps	
27	88	(United Kingdom) Martin Walford	Lotus 22	1962	1	+9 laps	
28	10	(United Kingdom) Hugh Chalmers	Lotus 22	1962	1	+9 laps	
No lap	15	(United Kingdom) Michael Hibberd	Lotus 27	1963			
No lap	16	(Germany) Stephan Jocher	Brabham BT6	1963			
No lap	81	(Italy) Alessandro Ripamonti	De Sanctis	1962			
No lap	19	(United States) Gil Nickel	Lotus 27	1963			
DNS	6	(United Kingdom) David Birrell	Brabham BT6	1963			
DNS	11	(France) Jean-Michel Coll	Lotus 20/22	1961			
DNS	22	(United States) Tupper Robinson	Lola Mk5A	1963			

=== Série F: Pre 1966 Grand Prix cars ===
Pos.	No.	Driver	Car	Year	Laps	Time/retired	Grid
1	11	(United Kingdom) Frank Sytner	Brabham BT4	1962	10	20:43.132	3
2	7	(Germany) Dr. Thomas Bscher	BRM P261	1964	10	+9.371	1
3	6	(United States) James King	Brabham BT7	1963	10	+19.109	
4	26	(United Kingdom) Rod Jolley	Cooper T45/T51	1958	10	+38.917	2
5	15	(United States) Murray Smith	Brabham BT11A	1964	10	+1:07.183	
6	12	(United Kingdom) Anthony Hancock	LDS F1	1961	10	+1:10.122	
7	24	(United Kingdom) Christopher Smith	Lotus 21	1961	10	+1:20.406	
8	2	(United Kingdom) Irvine Laidlaw	BRM P57	1962	10	+1:20.720	
9	19	(United Kingdom) Sidney Hoole	Cooper T66	1963	10	+1:52.798	
10	5	(United Kingdom) David Clark	BRM P57	1961	10	+2:01.557	
11	23	(United Kingdom) Philip Walker	Derrington-Francis	1964	10	+2:04.700	
12	9	(United States) Howard Cherry	Lola Mk4	1962	10	+2:05.922	
13	28	(United Kingdom) Roy Walzer	Lotus 24	1962	9	+1 lap	
14	8	(United Kingdom) Mark Griffiths	Lotus 18	1961	9	+1 lap	
15	34	(Belgium) André Wanty	Lotus 18/21	1961	9	+1 lap	
16	30	(Italy) Jason Wright	ATS 100	1962	9	+1 lap	
17	25	(United Kingdom) Steve O'Rourke	Lotus 24	1962	9	+1 lap	
18	3	(United States) Bruce McCaw	BRM P261	1964	9	+1 lap	
19	31	(Italy) Paolo Gecchelin	Lotus 18	1959	9	+1 lap	
20	1	(Germany) Richard Weiland	Lotus 24	1962	9	+1 lap	
21	17	(Argentina) Jorge Ferioli	Lola Mk4	1962	9	+1 lap	
22	4	(Italy) Marco Antonucci	LDS F1	1963	8	+2 laps	
23	27	(United States) Raymond Boissoneau	Cooper T66	1961	8	+2 laps	
24	33	(United Kingdom) Malcolm Ricketts	Lotus 32B	1964	4	+6 laps	
25	32	(Netherlands) Adrien van der Kroft	Cooper T51	1959	4	+6 laps	
26	18	(Italy) Marco Cajani	De Tomaso	1961	4	+6 laps	
27	10	(United Kingdom) William Binnie	Cooper T51	1959	3	+7 laps	
28	20	(United States) Douglas Mockett	Cooper T53	1961	2	+8 laps	
29	22	(Germany) Dieter Streve-Mühlens	Lotus 24	1962	2	+8 laps	
30	29	(United Kingdom) Alan Baillie	Lotus 18	1960	1	+9 laps	
No lap	16	(United States) Duncan Dayton	Brabham BT11	1964			
DNS	14	(Belgium) Michel Wanty	Lotus 24	1961			
DNS	21	(Brazil) Abba Kogan	Brabham BT7A	1963			

=== Série G: Pre 1979 Formula 1 cars ===
Pos.	No.	Driver	Car	Year	Laps	Time/retired	Grid
1	32	(United Kingdom) Martin Stretton	Tyrrell P34	1977	10	21:20.686	
2	2	(Malaysia) Alex Yoong	Lotus 72	1971	10	+5.163	3
3	18	(United Kingdom) Christopher Perkins	Surtees TS16	1974	10	+9.652	
4	6	(Netherlands) Nico Bindels	Lotus 77	1976	10	+27.219	
5	7	(Switzerland) Hubertus Bahlsen	Brabham-Alfa Romeo	1977	10	+28.091	2
6	8	(United Kingdom) Mike Littlewood	Wolf WR1	1977	10	+28.249	
7	27	(United States) Steve Earle	McLaren M23	1977	10	+29.356	
8	28	(United States) Douglas Mockett	Penske PC3	1975	10	+29.586	
9	4	(United Kingdom) Trevor Reeves	Tyrrell 008	1978	10	+33.845	
10	12	(United States) John Delane	Tyrrell 002	1971	10	+44.538	
11	23	(United Kingdom) George Liebert	Eagle Mk1	1966	10	+1:04.899	
12	17	(France) Jean Guikas	Ferrari 312B3	1974	9	+1 lap	
13	14	(United States) Todd Morici	Ferrari 312	1967	9	+1 lap	
14	1	(United States) Chris MacAllister	Ferrari 312T2	1976	9	+1 lap	
15	33	(Republic of Ireland) Ean Pugh	BRM P126/P133	1968	9	+1 lap	
16	21	(United Kingdom) Simon de Lautour	Cooper T81	1966	8	+2 laps	
17	30	(United Kingdom) Ron Maydon	Cooper-Alfa Romeo	1968	8	+2 laps	
18	20	(Monaco) Yves Saguato	Matra MS120C	1971	6	+4 laps	
19	31	(United States) John Dimmer	Tyrrell 004	1971	5	+5 laps	
20	10	(United States) Murray Smith	Brabham BT42	1973	3	+7 laps	
21	22	(United Kingdom) Robert Lamplough	March 711	1971	3	+7 laps	
22	26	(Japan) Junro Nishida	Lotus 77	1976	3	+7 laps	
23	24	(United Kingdom) Andy Wolfe	Hesketh 308E	1977	2	+8 laps	
24	19	(France) Flavien Marcais	BRM P180	1972	1	+9 laps	1
25	11	(Spain) Joaquín Folch-Rusiñol	Surtees TS19	1978	1	+9 laps	
26	15	(United Kingdom) David Clark	McLaren M19A	1971	1	+9 laps	
No lap	29	(Italy) Mauro Bompani	March 701	1970			
DNS	2	(United Kingdom) David McLaughlin	Lotus 72	1971			
DNS	3	(Brazil) Abba Kogan	McLaren M23	1976			
DNS	9	(Japan) Takuma Sato	Lotus 49B	1968			
DNS	11	(Spain) Joaquín Folch-Rusiñol	Ferrari 312T3	1978			
DNS	16	(France) Henri Pescarolo	Matra MS120	1971			
DNS	25	(Netherlands) Joos Tollenaar	March 721X	1972			
DNS	26		Lotus 77	1976			
DNA		(Denmark) Tom Belsø	Williams FW03				
