= 1997 Historic Grand Prix of Monaco =

Next race →
- Circuit de Monaco

Race details
- Date: 3–4 May 1997
- Official name: Grand Prix de Monaco Historique
- Location: Circuit de Monaco
- Course: Street circuit
- Course length: 3.370 km (2.094 miles)

The 1997 Historic Grand Prix of Monaco was the inaugural running of the Historic Grand Prix of Monaco, a motor racing event for heritage Grand Prix, Voiturettes, Formula One, Formula Two and Sports cars.

== Report ==
1997 represented the 700th anniversary of the Grimaldi family's presidency over Monaco. Celebrations were held throughout the year and among these was a series of historic motor races at the Circuit de Monaco. It was initially conceived as a one-off, but proved so popular that it was later revived as a biennial event from 2000.

The 1979 Monaco Grand Prix had featured a support race for historic cars, won by Martin Morris in ERA R11B. Additional historic races had been held in support of the 1982 (winner Bruce Halford was in attendance at this event) and 1983 events under the suggestion of the Hon. Patrick Lindsay. His son Valentine, along with Peter Hannen and Max Poggi, were responsible for organising the 1997 event to tie in with the 700th anniversary. Valentine's two brothers would race in the event itself: James drove an Alfa Romeo 8C Monza in Race A (crashing out in practice), while Ludovic drove a Ferrari 375 in Race B and a Maserati 250F in Race D. Ludovic crashed in practice for Race B, sustaining minor injuries, but still raced.

Hannen took part in Races B and C, taking second place in both. In Race C, he was forced to start from the pit lane after mistakenly believing his steering was damaged on the formation lap. He put on an overtaking masterclass and finished second, having pressured race leaders Frank Sytner and Emanuele Pirro for much of the race.

1968 Monaco Grand Prix runner-up Richard Attwood impressed with his performance in Race D and also set the fastest lap. A third former F1 driver was three-time Monaco Grand Prix winner Stirling Moss. He was entered for Race D but suffered a cylinder head failure and did not start. He gave a strong showing in Race E, running third until a somewhat reluctant Martin Stretton passed him.

Phil Hill was slated to appear in a Ferrari Testa Rossa but did not feature in the event.

During the weekend, Prince Rainier unveiled a statue of Louis Chiron at the Piscine which still stands today.

== Results ==
=== Summary ===
Série	Cars	Years	Pole position		Fastest lap		Race winner
A	Grand Prix - two-seater	Pre-1934	(Germany) Klaus Werner	2:18.767	(Germany) Klaus Werner	2:21.192	(France) Jean-Louis Duret
B	Grand Prix	Pre-1952	(United Kingdom) Martin Stretton	2:03.857	(United Kingdom) Martin Stretton	2:02.796	(United Kingdom) Martin Stretton
C	Ferrari sports cars	Pre-1959	(United Kingdom) Frank Sytner	2:10.007	(United Kingdom) Peter Hannen	2:07.180	(United Kingdom) Frank Sytner
D	Grand Prix	Pre-1960	(United Kingdom) Rod Jolley	1:59.685	(United Kingdom) Richard Attwood	1:57.948	(United Kingdom) Rod Jolley
E	Sports cars	Pre-1960	(United Kingdom) Lindsay Owen-Jones	2:04.212	(United Kingdom) Lindsay Owen-Jones	2:02.703	(United Kingdom) Lindsay Owen-Jones
F	Grand Prix	Pre-1968	(Spain) Joaquín Folch-Rusiñol	1:55.645	(Spain) Joaquín Folch-Rusiñol	1:55.169	(Spain) Joaquín Folch-Rusiñol
G	Formula Junior		(Germany) Stephan Jocher	2:02.257	(United Kingdom) Tony Thompson	2:01.693	(United States) Duncan Dayton

=== Série A: Pre 1934 two-seater Grand Prix cars ===
Pos.	No.	Driver	Car	Year	Laps	Time/retired	Grid
1	16	(France) Jean-Louis Duret	Bugatti 35B	1926	10	24:23.995	
2	26	(Germany) Fritz Grashei	Alfa Romeo 8C Monza	1933	10	+7.283	
3	31	(Germany) Klaus Werner	Alfa Romeo 8C Monza	1932	10	+21.238	1
4	14	(United Kingdom) Richard Wills	Bugatti 35	1924	10	+52.816	
5	24	(United Kingdom) Chris Drake	Maserati 8C	1933	10	+1:06.346	
6	11	(Netherlands) Bart Rosman	Bugatti 37	1925	10	+1:13.306	
7	28	(United Kingdom) Terry Cohn	Alfa Romeo 8C Monza	1932	10	+1:30.690	
8	12	(United Kingdom) Michael Steele	Bugatti 35T	1926	10	+1:34.494	
9	6	(Switzerland) Michael Gans	Bugatti 37A	1927	10	+1:36.669	
10	10	(Germany) Thomas Feierabend	Bugatti 37	1927	10	+1:58.487	
DNS	21	(United Kingdom) James Lindsay	Alfa Romeo 8C Monza	1933			
?	1	(United Kingdom) David Clark	Bugatti 37A	1927			
?	2	(Canada) David Cohen	Talbot	1927			
?	3	(United Kingdom) Mary Grant-Jonkers	Amilcar C6	1927			
?	4	(Belgium) Paul Grant	Amilcar C6	1927			
?	5	(United Kingdom) Peter Green	MG K3	1933			
?	7	(Monaco) Jean-Claude Miloe	Bugatti 51	1927/31			
?	8	(United Kingdom) Dick Smith	Frazer Nash Nūrburg	1932			
?	9	(Germany) Gunther Stamm	MG K3	1933/34			
?	15	(France) Nicolas Chambon	Bugatti 35C	1925			
?	17	(United Kingdom) John Howell	Bugatti 45	1930			
?	18	(Brazil) Abba Kogan	Bugatti 35B	1926			
?	19	(United Kingdom) John Lewis	Bugatti 35C	1928			
?	22	(United States) Dean Butler	Bugatti 51	1931			
?	23	(United Kingdom) Charles Dean	Bugatti 51	1932			
?	25	(United Kingdom) Martin Walford	Maserati 8C	1931			
?	27	(Germany) Hartmut Ibing	Alfa Romeo 8C Monza	1932			
?	30	(United States) Peter Mullin	Bugatti 51	1933/34			

=== Série B: Pre 1952 Grand Prix cars ===
Pos.	No.	Driver	Car	Year	Laps	Time/retired	Grid
1	17	(United Kingdom) Martin Stretton	Maserati 4CM	1932/36	10	21:11.119	1
2	8	(United Kingdom) Peter Hannen	Maserati 6CM	1937	10	+13.971	
3	22	(United Kingdom) Willie Green	Alfa Romeo 159	1948	10	+15.569	
4	14	(United Kingdom) John Ure	ERA	1935	10	+36.385	
5	3	(United Kingdom) Matt Grist	Alfa Romeo 8C	1935	10	+1:01.064	
6	10	(United Kingdom) Irvine Laidlaw	Maserati 6CM	1936	10	+1:34.139	
7	12	(United Kingdom) Robin Lodge	Maserati 4CM	1936	10	+1:40.739	
8	16	(United Kingdom) Bruce Spollon	ERA	1936	10	+1:41.003	
9	30	(United Kingdom) Richard Pilkington	Talbot-Lago T26C	1950	10	+1:47.274	
10	6	(Germany) Ernst Schuster	Maserati 6C	1934	9	+1 lap	
?	1	(Germany) Robert Fink	Alfa Romeo P3	1932/34			
?	2	(United Kingdom) Peter Giddings	Alfa Romeo 8C	1935			
?	4	(Germany) Peter Altenbach	Maserati 4CM	1934			
?	5	(Germany) Stephan Rettenmaier	Maserati 4CM	1934			
?	7	(United Kingdom) Martin Walford	Maserati 8CTF	1938			
?	9	(United Kingdom) Tony Merrick	Ferrari 166 FL	1949			
?	11	(Switzerland) Franz Messerli	Maserati 4CM	1932			
?	15	(United Kingdom) Jeffrey Pattinson	ERA	1935			
?	18	(United Kingdom) Philip Walker	MG K3	1933/36			
?	19	(Switzerland) Jost Wildbolz	ERA	1936			
?	20	(Portugal) José Manuel Albuquerque	Maserati 4CLT	1949			
?	21	(France) Jean-Louis Duret	Maserati 4CLT	1948			
?	23	(United Kingdom) Dan Margulies	Maserati 4CL	1939			
?	24	(Germany) Norbert Schmitz-Koep	Maserati 4CL	1939			
?	25	(United Kingdom) Ludovic Lindsay	Ferrari 375	1950			
?	26	(France) François Bernard	Gordini T11	1946			
?	27	(Belgium) François d'Huart	Talbot-Lago T26C	1948			
?	28	(United Kingdom) John Foster	Gordini T15	1948			
?	29	(Switzerland) Max Lustenberger	Talbot-Lago T26GS	1951			
?	31	(France) Philippe Renault	Talbot-Lago T26C	1948			

=== Série C: Pre 1959 Ferrari sports cars ===
Pos.	No.	Driver	Car	Year	Laps	Time/retired	Grid
1	27	(United Kingdom) Frank Sytner	Ferrari 250 TR	1958	10	22:21.689	1
2	17	(United Kingdom) Peter Hannen	Ferrari 750 Monza	1955	10	+1.165	PL
3	15	(Portugal) José Manuel Albuquerque	Ferrari 750 Monza	1955	10	+25.885	
4	11	(Italy) Emanuele Pirro	Ferrari 375 MM	1953	10	+32.089	
5	28	(United Kingdom) Robert Lamplough	Ferrari 250 TR	1958	10	+32.303	
6	10	(Germany) Christian Gläsel	Ferrari 375 MM	1953	10	+34.103	
7	25	(Germany) Ernst Schuster	Ferrari 500 TRC	1957	10	+1:00.322	
8	8	(Germany) Mario Bernardi	Ferrari 250 MM	1953	10	+1:16.650	
9	21	(United Kingdom) David Cottingham	Ferrari 500 TRC	1957	10	+1:19.129	
10	14	(Switzerland) Erich Traber	Ferrari 250 MM	1953	10	+1:20.710	
?	1	(Australia) Peter Briggs	Ferrari 195 S	1950			
?	2	(Brazil) Abba Kogan	Ferrari 212	1952			
?	3	(United Kingdom) Sally Mason-Styrron	Ferrari 166 MM	1950			
?	4	(Germany) Harald Mergard	Ferrari 225 S	1952			
?	5	(France) Antoine Midy	Ferrari 212 Export	1951			
?	6	(United States) Gil Nickel	Ferrari 340 America	1951			
?	7	(Spain) Juan Quintano	Ferrari 166 MM	1950			
?	9	(Italy) Umberto Camellini	Ferrari 340 MM	1953			
?	12	(Germany) Hans Stukenbrock	Ferrari 250 MM	1953			
?	16	(France) Bernard Duc	Ferrari 500 Mondial	1954			
?	19	(Monaco) Franco Meiners	Ferrari 225 S	1952			
?	20	(Germany) Dieter Streve-Mühlens	Ferrari 750 Monza	1954			
?	22	(Italy) Federico Dubbini	Ferrari 250 TR	1958			
?	23	(Switzerland) Giancarlo Galeazzi	Ferrari 500 TR	1956			
?	24	(Italy) Francesco Guasti	Ferrari 500 TRC	1957			
?	29	(Mexico) Nicolas Zapata	Ferrari 625 TR	1956			

=== Série D: Pre 1960 Grand Prix cars ===
Pos.	No.	Driver	Car	Year	Laps	Time/retired	Grid
1	27	(United Kingdom) Rod Jolley	Cooper T51	1958/59	10	20:06.565	1
2	26	(United Kingdom) John Harper	Cooper T51	1959	10	+8.913	
3	14	(United Kingdom) Nigel Corner	Maserati 250F	1957	10	+32.193	
4	12	(United Kingdom) John Beasley	Cooper T45	1958	10	+32.809	
5	23	(United Kingdom) Lindsay Owen-Jones	Maserati 250F	1958	10	+39.779	
6	21	(United Kingdom) Ludovic Lindsay	Maserati 250F	1958	10	+40.617	
7	28	(United Kingdom) Robin Lodge	Ferrari Dino 246	1959	10	+52.527	
8	11	(Germany) Burkhard von Schenk	Maserati 250F	1956	10	+56.087	
9	31	(Italy) Jason Wright	Cooper T51	1959	10	+1:20.908	
10	16	(United Kingdom) Chris Drake	Lotus 16	1958	10	+1:35.348	
DNS	32	(United Kingdom) Stirling Moss	Cooper T45	1957			10
?	1	(United Kingdom) Jeremy Agace	Maserati 250F	1956			
?	2	(United Kingdom) Bobby Bell	Maserati 250F	1956			
?	3	(United Kingdom) Graham Burrows	Cooper T23	1953			
?	4	(United Kingdom) Gregor Fisken	Cooper T23	1953			
?	5	(United Kingdom) Tony Merrick	Ferrari 555 "Supersqualo"	1955			
?	6	(United Kingdom) Ian Nuthall	Alta	1952			
?	7	(United Kingdom) David Pennell	Maserati 250F	1956			
?	8	(Republic of Ireland) Ean Pugh	Connaught B	1956			
?	9	(Germany) Katharina Schmidt	Cooper GP 2/T/40	1955			
?	10	(Germany) Dieter Streve-Mühlens	Maserati 250F	1956			
?	15	(Austria) Corrado Cupellini	Ferrari Dino 156	1957			
?	17	(South Africa) Ivan Glasby	Cooper T43	1957			
?	18	(United Kingdom) Michael Haywood	Cooper T45	1958			
?	19	(Germany) Hartmut Ibing	Maserati 250F	1957			
?	20	(United Kingdom) Irvine Laidlaw	Maserati 250F	1957			
?	22	(United States) Bruce McCaw	BRM P45	1958			
?	24	(Germany) Ludwig Willisch	Cooper T45	1958			
?	25	(United Kingdom) Richard Attwood	Cooper T51	1959			
?	29	(United States) Donald Orosco	Scarab F1	1960			
?	30	(United Kingdom) Philip Walker	Lotus 16	1959			

=== Série E: Pre 1960 sports cars ===
Pos.	No.	Driver	Car	Year	Laps	Time/retired	Grid
1	30	(United Kingdom) Lindsay Owen-Jones	Maserati Tipo 61	1959	10	20:45.312	1
2	24	(United Kingdom) Frank Sytner	Jaguar D-Type	1956	10	+1.200	
3	10	(United Kingdom) Martin Stretton	Maserati 300S	1955	10	+48.575	
4	29	(United Kingdom) Stirling Moss	Maserati Tipo 61	1959	10	+59.744	
5	17	(United Kingdom) Peter Austin	Lotus 11	1957	10	+1:01.088	
6	22	(Denmark) Otto Reedtz-Thott	Lotus 11	1956	10	+1:25.920	
7	6	(Australia) Spencer Martin	Jaguar C-Type	1953	10	+1:27.825	
8	9	(United Kingdom) Barrie Williams	Jaguar C-Type	1953	10	+1:35.756	
9	3	(United Kingdom) Gary Pearson	Jaguar C-Type	1953	10	+1:38.961	
10	4	(United Kingdom) Ron Gammons	Lotus 11	1956	10	+1:40.186	
DNS	4	(United States) James Herlinger	Baldwin	1951			
?	1	(France) Jean-François Bentz	Cooper-Bristol	1952			
?	2	(United Kingdom) Gregor Fisken	Jaguar C-Type	1953			
?	5	(United Kingdom) Mike Lester	HWM	1953			
?	7	(United Kingdom) Peter Mann	Frazer Nash	1952			
?	8	(Denmark) Jorn Quiste	Jaguar D-Type	1956			
?	11	(United Kingdom) Adrian Hall	Lotus 10	1955			
?	12	(United Kingdom) Dudley Mason-Styrron	Maserati 300S	1955			
?	14	(Switzerland) Christian Traber	Aston Martin DB3S	1953/54			
?	15	(United States) Bruce Trenery	Aston Martin DB3S	1955			
?	16	(United Kingdom) Willie Tuckett	Jaguar D-Type	1955			
?	18	(United Kingdom) Marshall Bailey	Cooper T39	1956			
?	19	(France) Pierre Pinelli	Lotus 11	1956			
?	20	(Germany) Hurbertus Doenhoff	Maserati 150S	1956			
?	21	(United Kingdom) Martin McGlone	Aston Martin DB3S	1957			
?	23	(United Kingdom) Ken Rogers	Lotus 11	1957			
?	25	(Germany) Burkhard von Schenk	Maserati 300S	1958			
?	26	(United Kingdom) Terry Jones	Ferrari Dino 246	1959			
?	27	(United Kingdom) Charles March	Lola Mk1	1959			
?	28	(United Kingdom) Nick Mason	Maserati Tipo 60	1959			
?	31	(United States) Paul Pappalardo	Ferrari 250 TR	1959			

=== Série F: Pre 1968 Grand Prix cars ===
Pos.	No.	Driver	Car	Year	Laps	Time/retired	Grid
1	26	(Spain) Joaquín Folch-Rusiñol	Lotus 49	1967	10	19:34.712	1
2	27	(Brazil) Abba Kogan	Brabham	1967	10	+47.034	
3	23	(United Kingdom) Allan Miles	Cooper T53	1961	10	+1:06.985	
4	28	(United Kingdom) Robert Lamplough	Ferrari 312	1967	10	+1:08.888	
5	12	(United Kingdom) Mark Linstone	Brabham BT11	1964	10	+1:23.421	
6	31	(United Kingdom) Malcolm Ricketts	Lotus 32B	1965/66	10	+1:25.883	
7	3	(United Kingdom) Christopher Smith	Lotus 21	1961	10	+1:25.968	
8	29	(United States) Bruce McCaw	BRM P261	1964/66	10	+1:58.788	
9	9	(United States) Duncan Dayton	Lola Mk4	1962	10	+2:04.576	
10	11	(United Kingdom) Sidney Hoole	Cooper T66	1963	9	+1 lap	
?	30	(Monaco) Franco Meiners	Ferrari 312	1967	1		
?	1	(Italy) Paolo Gecchelin	Lotus 18	1961			
?	2	(Italy) Pierluigi Mapelli	Lotus 18	1961			
?	4	(Germany) Richard Weiland	Lotus 24	1962			
?	5	(United States) David Whiteside	Lotus 21	1961			
?	6	(United States) Robert Woodward	Lotus 21	1962			
?	7	(United Kingdom) Marshall Bailey	Brabham BT11	1964			
?	8	(United Kingdom) Robert Brooks	BRM P57/P58	1962			
?	10	(United Kingdom) Geoff Farmer	Lotus 25	1962			
?	14	(Italy) Alessandro Ripamonti	Lotus 24	1962			
?	15	(Italy) Guido Romani	Lola Mk4	1962			
?	16	(Italy) Giorgio Valentini	Brabham BT7	1963			
?	17	(Belgium) Michel Wanty	Lotus 24	1962			
?	18	(United Kingdom) Jeremy Agace	Lotus 18	1960			
?	19	(United Kingdom) Paul Alexander	Lotus 24	1962			
?	20	(United Kingdom) Allan Baillie	Lotus 24	1962			
?	21	(United States) Joel Finn	Lotus 18	1960			
?	22	(United Kingdom) John Harper	Brabham BT4A	1962			
?	24	(Italy) Marco Cajani	De Tomaso	1961			
?	25	(Belgium) Jean Blaton	Lotus 49	1967			

=== Série G: Formula Junior ===
Pos.	No.	Driver	Car	Year	Laps	Time/retired	Grid
1	25	(United States) Duncan Dayton	Cooper T67	1963	10	21:11.410	
2	31	(United Kingdom) Tony Thompson	Lotus 27	1963	10	+0.568	
3	27	(Germany) Stephan Jocher	Brabham BT6	1963	10	+8.066	1
4	28	(United States) Douglas Mockett	Cooper T56	1961	10	+27.518	
5	18	(Switzerland) Jean-Michel Farine	Lotus 20	1961	10	+28.370	
6	29	(United States) Gil Nickel	Lotus 27	1963	10	+38.766	
7	16	(Monaco) Marcus Mussa	Lotus 18 Junior	1960	10	+1:24.489	
8	21	(Italy) Luciano Quaggia	Brabham BT6	1963	10	+1:42.152	
9	23	(Italy) Dario Tellarini	Foglietti	1963	10	+1:42.523	
10	11	(United Kingdom) Tony Steele	Lola Mk2	1960	10	+2:02.077	
?	1	(Austria) Egon Hofer	OSCA	1959			
?	2	(Italy) Sergio Leoni	Stanguellini	1959			
?	3	(France) Flavien Marcais	Stanguellini	1958			
?	4	(Italy) Ugo Piccagli	Bandini	1959			
?	5	(Italy) Fabio Verin	Volpini	1958			
?	6	(Germany) Dieter Crone	Elva	1960			
?	7	(South Africa) Richard Daggitt	Scorpion	1960			
?	8	(United Kingdom) David Pratley	Lola Mk2	1960			
?	9	(United Kingdom) Duncan Rabagliati	Alexis FJ	1959			
?	10	(Italy) Guido Romani	Lola Mk2	1959			
?	12	(United Kingdom) Grant Wilson	Gemini	1959			
?	14	(Italy) Fabio d'Alberti	De Sanctis	1958			
?	15	(Germany) Peter Knöfel	Emeryson	1960			
?	17	(Netherlands) Joos Tollenaar	Lola Mk3	1961			
?	19	(Denmark) Erich Justesen	Lotus 22	1962			
?	20	(United Kingdom) Allan McGregor	Cooper T59	1962			
?	22	(Italy) Alessandro Ripamonti	De Tomaso	1962			
?	24	(United States) Dan Davis	Lola Mk5A	1963			
?	26	(Spain) Joaquín Folch-Rusiñol	Lotus 27	1963			
?	30	(Italy) Ermanno Rochi	Brabham BT6	1963			
