= 2000 Historic Grand Prix of Monaco =

← Previous race	Next race →
- Circuit de Monaco

Race details
- Date: 27–28 May 2000
- Official name: 2e Grand Prix de Monaco Historique
- Location: Circuit de Monaco
- Course: Street circuit
- Course length: 3.370 km (2.094 miles)

The 2000 Historic Grand Prix of Monaco was the second running of the Historic Grand Prix of Monaco, a motor racing event for heritage Grand Prix, Voiturettes, Formula One, Formula Two and Sports cars.

== Report ==
In Race A, Barrie Williams put on a strong recovery drive from the back of the grid to finish third.

Stirling Moss was entered for Race C in a Ferrari 225 S but Willie Green took his place in the race.

Race D featured a tense lead battle between Martin Stretton and Nigel Corner, the latter driving the Maserati 250F with which Juan Manuel Fangio had won the 1957 Monaco Grand Prix. Corner retired with gearbox failure and soon afterward the 250F of Klaus Edel dropped a large amount of oil at Sainte Devote. This caused Gregor Fisken and Spencer Flack to crash out of third and fifth respectively, and the race was red-flagged after seven of the scheduled ten laps. Moss's winning 250F from 1956 also featured in the race.

Driving a Caravelle in Race E was James Hicks, son of the marque's founder Robert.

Race F featured former F1 drivers Moss, who finished seventh, and Maurice Trintignant, the latter reunited with the Cooper T45 he had driven to victory in the 1958 Monaco Grand Prix.

== Results ==
=== Summary ===
Série	Cars	Years	Pole position		Fastest lap		Race winner
A	Grand Prix - two-seater	Pre-1934	(United Kingdom) Julian Majzub	2:12.893	(United Kingdom) Julian Majzub	2:11.899	(United Kingdom) Julian Majzub
B	Grand Prix - single-seater	Pre-1952	(United Kingdom) John Ure	2:06.836	(United Kingdom) Barrie Williams	2:08.250	(United Kingdom) John Ure
C	Sports cars with drum brakes	Pre-1959	(Germany) Claudia Hürtgen	2:11.156	(Germany) Claudia Hürtgen	2:08.509	(Germany) Claudia Hürtgen
D	Grand Prix - front engine	Pre-1961	(United Kingdom) Martin Stretton	2:02.009	(United Kingdom) Nigel Corner	1:59.722	(United Kingdom) Martin Stretton
E	Formula Junior	1958-1963	(United Kingdom) Denis Welch	1:57.292	(United Kingdom) Denis Welch	1:58.237	(United Kingdom) Denis Welch
F	Grand Prix - rear engine	Pre-1966					(United States) Duncan Dayton

=== Série A: Pre 1934 two-seater Grand Prix cars ===
Pos.	No.	Driver	Car	Year	Laps	Time/retired	Grid
1	1	(United Kingdom) Julian Majzub	Bugatti 35B	1927	10	22:17.332	1
2	6	(United Kingdom) Charles Dean	Bugatti 51	1932	10	+14.985	
3	16	(United Kingdom) Mark Gillies	Riley-Dixon	1933	10	+1:32.287	
4	8	(France) Jean-Louis Duret	Bugatti 35B	1926	10	+1:32.739	
5	14	(Netherlands) Bart Rosman	Bugatti 35C	1929	10	+1:48.525	
6	29	(United Kingdom) Michael Steele	Bugatti 35T	1926	10	+1:50.547	
7	30	(Germany) Klaus Werner	Alfa Romeo 8C Monza	1932	10	+2:05.763	
8	28	(United Kingdom) Terry Cohn	Alfa Romeo 8C Monza	1932	9	+1 lap	
9	15	(United States) Christopher Gardner	Bugatti 35C	1927	9	+1 lap	
10	7	(United Kingdom) Chris Drake	Maserati 8C	1933	9	+1 lap	
?	2	(United Kingdom) Philip Champion	Frazer Nash 1500	1928			
?	3	(United Kingdom) Chris Chilcott	Frazer Nash 1500	1926			
?	4	(United Kingdom) Dick Smith	Frazer Nash Nūrburg	1932			
?	5	(Germany) Friedrich Daubert	Bugatti 37	1927			
?	9	(United Kingdom) Ivan Dutton	Bugatti 51	1932			
?	10	(United States) Scott Ebert	Bugatti 35	1926			
?	11	(United Kingdom) Robert Elliott-Pyle	Lea-Francis	1928			
?	12	(Germany) Thomas Feierabend	Bugatti 37	1927			
?	17	(Germany) Christian Gläsel	Alfa Romeo 8C Monza	1932			
?	18	(United Kingdom) Peter Neumark	Alfa Romeo 8C Monza	1932			
?	19	(Belgium) Paul Grant	Amilcar C0	1927			
?	20	(Germany) Fritz Grashei	Alfa Romeo 8C Monza	1933			
?	21	(Germany) Hartmut Ibing	Alfa Romeo 8C Monza	1932			
?	22	(United States) Dean Butler	Bugatti 51	1931			
?	23	(Germany) Rolf Meyer	Mercedes-Benz SSK	1928			
?	24	(United Kingdom) Mary Grant-Jonkers	Amilcar C6	1927			
?	25	(United Kingdom) Richard Odell	Riley SWB 11/40	1924			
?	26	(Switzerland) Michael Gans	Bugatti 37A	1927			
?	27	(Germany) Walter Rothlauf	Bugatti 37A	1928			
?	31	(United Kingdom) Richard Wills	Bugatti 35	1924			
?	32	(Germany) Axel Wulfing	Mercedes-Benz SSK	1928			

=== Série A: Pre 1952 Grand Prix Cars ===
Pos.	No.	Driver	Car	Year	Laps	Time/retired	Grid
1	16	(United Kingdom) John Ure	ERA B	1936	10	21:58.935	1
2	11	(United Kingdom) Irvine Laidlaw	Maserati 6CM	1937	10	+5.069	
3	25	(United Kingdom) Barrie Williams	ERA A	1934	10	+13.412	
4	29	(United Kingdom) Antony Stephens	ERA B	1939	10	+25.423	
5	3	(United Kingdom) Barrie Baxter	Maserati 4CM	1932-1935	10	+26.888	
6	14	(Germany) Robert Fink	Alfa Romeo P3	1932	10	+53.927	
7	5	(United Kingdom) Martin Walford	Maserati 8CTF	1938	10	+1:00.267	
8	21	(Germany) Josef Otto Rettenmaier	Maserati 6CM	1936	10	+1:59.417	
9	6	(Belgium) François d'Huart	Talbot-Lago T26C	1948	10	+2:00.912	
10	7	(United Kingdom) Patrick von Shoote	Ferrari 166	1949	10	+2:13.118	
?	1	(Germany) Peter Altenbach	Maserati 4CM	1934			
?	2	(France) Jean-Jacques Bally	Gordini T15	1946			
?	4	(United Kingdom) William Binnie	Maserati 4CM	1936			
?	8	(United Kingdom) Roger Lucas	Maserati 6CM	1936			
?	9	(Switzerland) Georg Kaufmann	Maserati 4CL	1939			
?	10	(Brazil) Abba Kogan	OSCA F2	1952			
?	12	(United Kingdom) Richard Last	MG K3	1933-1936			
?	15	(Switzerland) Max Lustenberger	Talbot-Lago T26	1950			
?	17	(United Kingdom) John May	Maserati A6GCM	1951			
?	18	(Italy) Matteo Panini	Maserati 6CM	1936			
?	19	(United Kingdom) Trisha Pilkington	Cisitalia D46	1946			
?	20	(Germany) Stephan Rettenmaier	OSCA G/4500	1951			
?	22	(Germany) Norbert Schmitz-Koep	Maserati 4CL	1939			
?	23	(Germany) Stefan Schollwoeck	Maserati 6CM	1937			
?	24	(Germany) Ernst Schuster	Maserati 6C	1934			
?	26	(United Kingdom) Stanley Mann	Veritas Meteor F2	1950			
?	27	(United Kingdom) Martin Stretton	ERA D	1935			
?	28	(Germany) Wolfgang Wegner	Maserati 4CL	1939			
?	30	(Austria) Peter Wiesner	Cisitalia D46	1946			

=== Série C: Pre 1959 Sports Cars with drum brakes ===
Pos.	No.	Driver	Car	Year	Laps	Time/retired	Grid
1	35	(Germany) Claudia Hürtgen	Maserati 300S	1955	10	21:48.102	1
2	3	(United Kingdom) Frank Sytner	Ferrari 250 TR	1957	10	+8.065	
3	16	(France) Flavien Marcais	Jaguar C-Type	1953	10	+22.317	
4	6	(United Kingdom) Julian Bronson	HWM-Jaguar	1954	10	+41.497	
5	1	(United Kingdom) Jeremy Agace	Maserati 250SI	1956	10	+48.615	
6	24	(United Kingdom) Richard Pilkington	Talbot-Lago T26	1950	10	+1:06.753	
7	8	(France) Pierre Rageys	Maserati 300S	1955	10	+1:14.663	
9	94	(United Kingdom) Willie Green	Ferrari 225 S	1952	10	+1:22.757	
10	11	(Italy) Roberto Crippa	Ferrari 750 Monza	1954	10	+1:55.724	
?	4	(France) Antoine Blasco	OSCA MT4	1952			
?	5	(Italy) Fabrizio Brigato	Ferrari 250 TR	1958			
?	7	(France) Olivier Cazalieres	Ferrari 225 S	1952			
?	9	(United Kingdom) David Clark	Ferrari 857 S	1956			
?	10	(Japan) Junro Nishida	Lotus Nine	1955			
?	12	(United States) Ed Davies	Ferrari 290 MM	1956			
?	14	(United States) Warren B. Eads	Porsche 550 A	1957			
?	15	(United States) Steve Earle	Jaguar C-Type	1953			
?	17	(Germany) Wolfgang Friedrichs	Aston Martin DB3	1952			
?	18	(Switzerland) Giancarlo Galeazzi	Ferrari 500 TR	1956			
?	20	(Germany) Hartmut Ibing	Maserati 300S	1955			
?	21	(Germany) Friedrich Kozka	Porsche 550 A	1956			
?	22	(United Kingdom) Peter Mann	Frazer Nash Sebring	1954			
?	23	(United Kingdom) Julian Michael Parr	Frazer Nash Targa Florio	1953			
?	25	(Spain) Juan Quintano	Ferrari 166 MM	1950			
?	26	(Italy) Cesare Radaelli	Maserati A6GCS	1947			
?	27	(Germany) Klaus Otto Räker	Porsche 718 RSK	1958			
?	28	(Italy) Jason Wright	Stanguellini 750 Barchetta	1953			
?	29	(Monaco) Raymond Squarciafichi	Allard J2	1951			
?	30	(Canada) Lawrence Stroll	Ferrari 250 TR	1958			
?	31	(United Kingdom) Willie Green	Frazer Nash	1953			
?	32	(Switzerland) Christian Traber	Ferrari 250 MM	1953			
?	33	(Germany) Tobias Aichele	Veritas RS	1948			
?	34	(United Kingdom) Brandon Wang	Ferrari 340 MM	1953			
?	36	(Germany) Michael Willms	Maserati 250S	1957			
?	37	(Mexico) Nicolas Zapata	Ferrari 500/625 TR	1956			

=== Série D: Pre 1961 Front Engined Grand Prix Cars ===
Pos.	No.	Driver	Car	Year	Laps	Time/retired	Grid
1	48	(United Kingdom) Martin Stretton	Ferrari 555 "Supersqualo"	1955	7	14:15.604	1
2	30	(Germany) Burkhard von Schenk	Maserati 250F	1956	7	+12.326	
3	10	(United Kingdom) Gregor Fisken	Cooper-Bristol Mk2	1953	7	+14.985	
4	12	(United Kingdom) Alain de Cadenet	Connaught B	1954	7	+16.374	2
5	18	(United Kingdom) Spencer Flack	Cooper-Bristol Mk1	1952	7	+17.023	
6	20	(Spain) Joaquín Folch-Rusiñol	Maserati 250F	1956	7	+36.743	
7	14	(United Kingdom) Barrie Williams	Connaught A	1952	7	+39.431	
8	22	(United States) Murray Smith	Maserati 250F	1956	7	+44.623	
9	8	(United Kingdom) Ian Nuthall	Alta	1952	7	+46.714	
10	24	(Germany) Dieter Streve-Mühlens	Maserati 250F	1954	7	+1:20.717	
?	1	(Portugal) José Manuel Albuquerque	Maserati 250F	1956			
?	2	(United Kingdom) Willie Green	Mercedes-Benz W196	1954			
?	3	(United Kingdom) Proby Cautley	Cooper-Bristol Mk1	1952			
?	4	(United Kingdom) David Coplowe	Connaught A	1952			
?	6	(Austria) Corrado Cupellini	Ferrari Dino V6	1959			
?	7	(South Africa) Richard Daggitt	Cooper-Bristol Mk1	1952			
?	9	(Germany) Klaus Edel	Maserati 250F	1954			
?	11	(Germany) Peter Gläsel	Maserati 250F	1954			
?	16	(United Kingdom) Peter Harris	Lotus 12	1957			
?	17	(United Kingdom) Graham Burrows	Cooper-Bristol Mk2	1953			
?	19	(Republic of Ireland) Ean Pugh	Connaught B	1956			
?	21	(Italy) Alessandro Ripamonti	Lotus 16	1959			
?	23	(United Kingdom) Michael Steele	Connaught C	1956			
?	28	(Switzerland) Peter Heuberger	Maserati 250F	1956			
?	32	(United Kingdom) Nigel Corner	Maserati 250F	1957			3
?	44	(United Kingdom) David Vine	Ferrari 625	1953			

=== Série E: Formula Junior - (1958-1963) ===
Pos.	No.	Driver	Car	Year	Laps	Time/retired	Grid
1	33	(United Kingdom) Denis Welch	Merlyn	1963	10	20:06.791	1
2	29	(United Kingdom) Tony Thompson	Lotus 27	1963	10	+4.640	
3	22	(Spain) Joaquín Folch-Rusiñol	Lotus 27	1964	10	+35.855	
4	88	(United Kingdom) Martin Walford	Lotus 22	1962	10	+40.368	
5	9	(Germany) Stephan Jocher	Brabham BT6	1963	10	+54.386	
6	57	(United Kingdom) Robin Longdon	Lola Mk5A	1963	10	+1:20.933	
7	4	(Germany) Hans-Joachim Durstcwitz	Lotus 22	1962	10	+1:30.052	
8	18	(Monaco) Marcus Mussa	Lotus 18	1960	10	+1:35.324	
9	30	(Netherlands) Joos Tollenaar	Lola Mk3	1961	10	+2:05.414	
10	27	(Italy) Dario Tellarini	Foglietti	1963	9	+1 lap	
?	1	(Germany) Hans Braun	Stanguellini	1959			
?	2	(Italy) Pierfranco Brezzo	Wainer	1963			
?	3	(South Africa) Richard Daggitt	Scorpion	1960			
?	5	(France) Henry Fabre	Stanguellini	1958			
?	6	(United States) Armand A. Giglio	Dagrada-Lancia	1959			
?	7	(Italy) Anacleto Giriolo	Brabham BT6	1963			
?	10	(Denmark) Erik Justesen	OSCA	1957			
?	11	(Germany) Peter Knöfel	Emeryson	1960			
?	12	(United Kingdom) Irvine Laidlaw	OSCA	1960			
?	15	(United Kingdom) Allan McGregor	Cooper T59	1962			
?	16	(Italy) Achille Minoia	De Sanctis	1958			
?	17	(United Kingdom) Mark Linstone	Sauter-DKW	1960			
?	19	(Italy) Matteo Panini	Stanguellini	1960			
?	20	(Italy) Ugo Piccagli	Bandini	1957			
?	21	(United Kingdom) David Pratley	Lola Mk2	1960			
?	23	(United Kingdom) Duncan Rabagliati	Alexis	1959			
?	24	(Italy) Alessandro Ripamonti	OSCA	1964			
?	25	(Monaco) Yves Saguato	Lotus 18	1964			
?	26	(Germany) Heinz Stege	Elva	1959			
?	28	(Belgium) Daan de Smedt	Gemini Mk2	1960			
?	31	(Italy) Fabio Verin	Volpini	1958			
?	34	(United Kingdom) Clive Wilson	Cooper T56	1960			
?	90	(United Kingdom) James Hicks	Caravelle	1960			

=== Série F: Pre 1966 Rear Engined Grand Prix Cars ===
Pos.	No.	Driver	Car	Year	Laps	Time/retired	Grid
1	16	(United States) Duncan Dayton	Brabham BT11	1964	10	19:32.705	
2	19	(United Kingdom) Paul Alexander	BRM P261	1964	10	+12.606	
3	6	(United States) James King	Brabham BT7	1963	10	+36.809	
4	25	(United Kingdom) Christopher Smith	Lotus 21	1961	10	+39.116	
5	18	(United Kingdom) Robert Lamplough	Lotus 33	1964	10	+1:15.851	
6	8	(United Kingdom) Malcolm Ricketts	Lotus 32B	1965	10	+1:16.112	
7	24	(United Kingdom) Stirling Moss	Cooper T53	1960	10	+1:42.363	
8	4	(United Kingdom) Allan Baillie	Lotus 18	1961	10	+1:56.059	
9	14	(United Kingdom) Allan McGregor	BRP-BRM	1964	9	+1 lap	
10	26	(United Kingdom) Peter Austin	Brabham BT11	1965	9	+1 lap	
?	1	(United Kingdom) Jeremy Agace	Lotus 24	1962			
?	2	(United States) Douglas Mockett	Cooper T53	1962			
?	3	(United States) Bruce McCaw	BRM P261	1964			
?	5	(United Kingdom) William Binnie	Cooper T51	1959			
?	7	(Germany) Dr. Thomas Bscher	BRM P261	1964			
?	9	(United Kingdom) Frank Sytner	Brabham BT7A	1965			
?	10	(United Kingdom) Geoff Farmer	Lotus 25	1962			
?	11	(Italy) Fabio d'Alberti	Cooper T56	1961			
?	12	(Italy) Guido Gecchelin	Lotus 18	1959			
?	15	(United Kingdom) Sidney Hoole	Cooper T66	1963			
?	17	(Brazil) Abba Kogan	Brabham BT7A	1963			
?	20	(France) Maurice Trintignant	Cooper T45	1958			
?	21	(United Kingdom) Steve O'Rourke	Lotus 24	1962			
?	22	(Germany) Dieter Streve-Mühlens	Lotus 24	1962			
?	23	(Italy) Guido Romani	Lola Mk4	1962			
?	27	(Italy) Marco Cajani	De Tomaso	1961			
?	28	(United Kingdom) Brian Anthony Ashby	Emeryson	1961			
?	29	(United Kingdom) Mark Linstone	Scirocco-BRM	1963			
?	30	(Germany) Richard Weiland	Lotus 24	1962			
