= Historic Grand Prix of Monaco =

Biennial series of car races

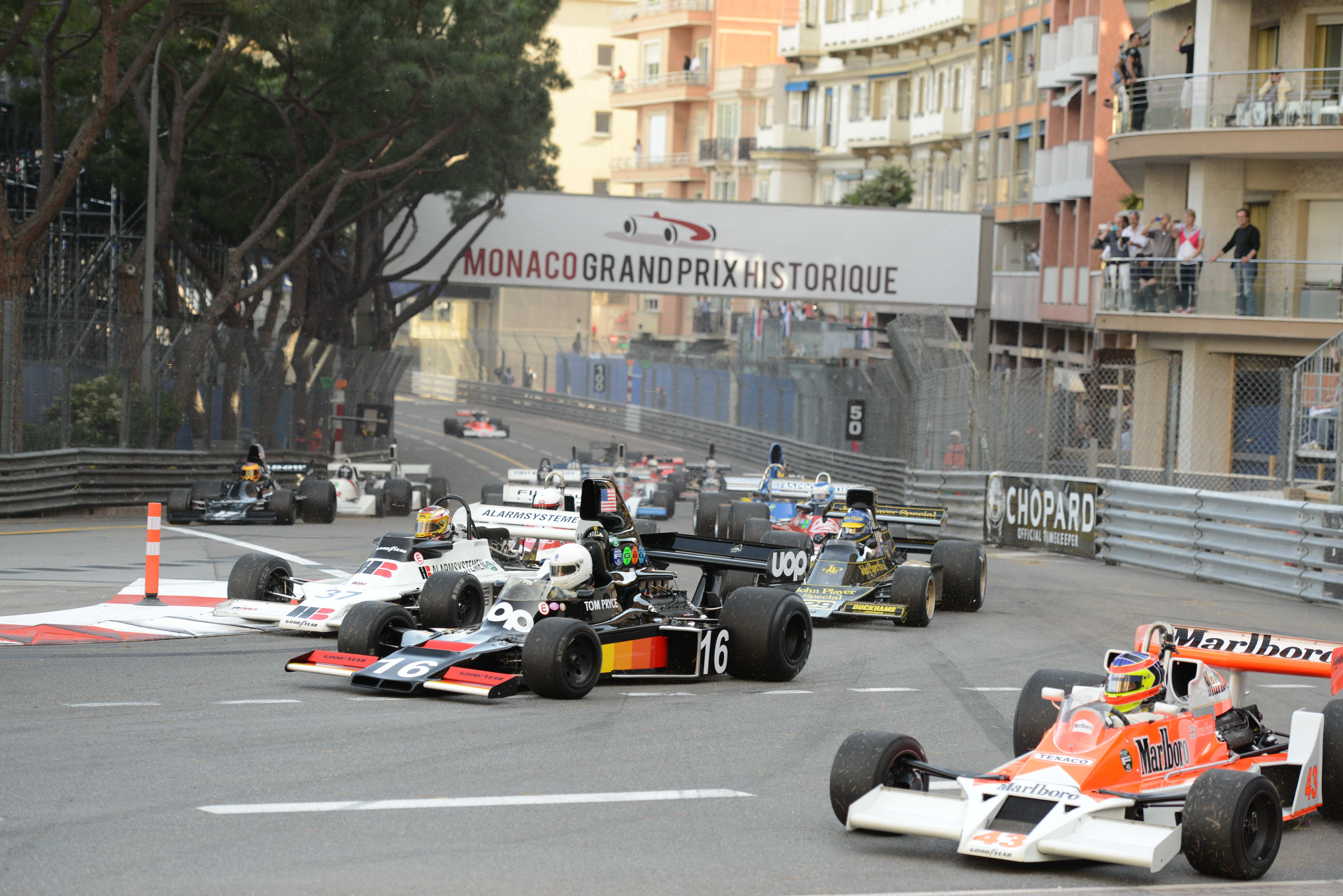
Start of the 2014 Race F (Formula One 1973-1978)

The Historic Grand Prix of Monaco (also called the Monaco Historic Grand Prix depending upon the source) is a series of automotive races focused on historic motorsport. The event is typically held biennially two weeks before the Formula One Grand Prix of Monaco.

== History ==
The first Monaco Historic Grand Prix was held in 1997 as part of the year-long celebrations marking the 700th anniversary of the Grimaldi family's presidency over Monaco. It had only been intended as a one-off event but became a huge success, leading to its continuation as a biennial event from 2000.

With the beginning of the Monaco ePrix Formula E race, the Historic Grand Prix alternated with the ePrix to be held in even-numbered and odd-numbered years respectively. The ePrix became an annual event since 2021. The 12th edition Historic Grand Prix was postponed due to the COVID-19 pandemic, instead taking place on April 25, 2021, two weeks before the Monaco ePrix and four weeks before the Formula One Grand Prix.

The 2010 running of the event was the seventh in the series. It featured eight races total, in various historic motorcar categories:

- Race A - Pre-1947 Voiturettes and Grand Prix cars
- Race B - Front-engined Grand Prix cars (1947–1960)
- Race C - Pre-1953 sports cars
- Race D - Formula 3, 1,000 cc (1964–1970)
- Race E - Rear-engined Grand Prix cars (1954–1965)
- Race F - Formula 1 (1966–1974)
- Race G - Formula 1 (1975–1978)
- Race H - Formula 3, 1,600 cc and 2,000 cc (1971–1984)

By the 9th running of the event in 2014, the number of races had been reduced to 7, and there had been some tweaking of the categories, better to distribute the competition:

- A: Pre-war "Voiturettes" and Grand Prix Cars (up to 1939)
- B: F1 and F2 Grand Prix Cars (pre-1961)
- C: Sports cars (1952–1955)
- D: F1 Grand Prix Cars (1961–1965)
- E: F1 Grand Prix Cars (1966–1972)
- F: F1 Grand Prix Cars (1973–1978)
- G: Formula 3 Cars, 2,000cc (1974–1978)

For the 11th running of the event in 2018 the number of races remained, the division into categories based on the year of manufacturing has been adjusted again. The following classes remained static for the 12th running of the event in 2021.

- Series A: Pre-war "Voiturettes" and Grand-Prix Cars, up to 1939
- Series B: Formula 1 and Formula 2 Grand Prix Cars, manufactured before 1961
- Series C: Sports Cars that ran from 1952 to 1957
- Series D: F1 Grand Prix Cars - 1500cc, from 1961 to 1965
- Series E: F1 Grand Prix Cars - from 1966 to 1972
- Series F: F1 Grand Prix Cars - from 1973 to 1976
- Series G: F1 Grand Prix Cars - from 1977 to 1980

== Winners ==
Year	Série	Cars	Years	Laps	Race winner	Car
1997	A	Grand Prix - two-seater	Pre-1934	10	(France) Jean-Louis Duret	Bugatti 35B
1997	B	Grand Prix	Pre-1952	10	(United Kingdom) Martin Stretton	Maserati 4CM
1997	C	Ferrari sports cars	Pre-1959	10	(United Kingdom) Frank Sytner	Ferrari 250 TR
1997	D	Grand Prix	Pre-1960	10	(United Kingdom) Rod Jolley	Cooper T51
1997	E	Sports cars	Pre-1960	10	(United Kingdom) Lindsay Owen-Jones	Maserati Tipo 61
1997	F	Grand Prix	Pre-1968	10	(Spain) Joaquín Folch-Rusiñol	Lotus 49
1997	G	Formula Junior		10	(United States) Duncan Dayton	Cooper T67
2000	A	Grand Prix - two-seater	Pre-1934	10	(United Kingdom) Julian Majzub	Bugatti 35B
2000	B	Grand Prix - single-seater	Pre-1952	10	(United Kingdom) John Ure	ERA B
2000	C	Sports cars with drum brakes	Pre-1959	10	(Germany) Claudia Hürtgen	Maserati 300S
2000	D	Grand Prix - front engine	Pre-1961	7	(United Kingdom) Martin Stretton	Ferrari 555 "Supersqualo"
2000	E	Formula Junior	1958-1963	10	(United Kingdom) Denis Welch	Merlyn Mk 5/7
2000	F	Grand Prix - rear engine	Pre-1966	10	(United States) Duncan Dayton	Brabham BT11
2002	A	Grand Prix - two-seater	Pre-1934	10	(United Kingdom) Charles Dean	Bugatti 51
2002	B	Grand Prix	Pre-1952	10	(United Kingdom) Julian Bronson	ERA B
2002	C	Sports cars	Pre-1959	10	(United Kingdom) David Franklin	Ferrari 750 Monza
2002	D	Grand Prix	Pre-1961	10	(United Kingdom) Martin Stretton	Connaught C
2002	E	Formula Junior - rear engine		10	(United Kingdom) Denis Welch	Merlyn Mk 5/7
2002	F	Grand Prix	Pre-1966	10	(United Kingdom) Frank Sytner	Brabham BT4
2002	G	Formula 1	Pre-1979	10	(United Kingdom) Martin Stretton	Tyrrell P34
2004	A	Grand Prix	Pre-1947	10	(United Kingdom) John Ure	ERA B
2004	B	Grand Prix - front engine	1947-1960	10	(United States) Duncan Dayton	Lotus 16
2004	C	Sports cars	Pre-1953	10	(France) Flavien Marcais	Jaguar C-Type
2004	D	Formula Junior - front engine		10	(United States) Joe Colasacco	Stanguellini FJ
2004	E	Grand Prix - rear engine	1954-1965	10	(United States) Duncan Dayton	Brabham BT11
2004	F	Formula 1	1966-1976	15	(United Kingdom) Martin Stretton	Tyrrell P34
2006	A	Grand Prix	Pre-1947	10	(Germany) Stefan Schollwoeck	Maserati 6CM
2006	B	Grand Prix - front engine	1947-1960	10	(United States) Duncan Dayton	Lotus 16
2006	C	Sports cars	Pre-1953	10	(United Kingdom) John Ure	Frazer Nash Le Mans Replica (Mk2)
2006	D	Formula Junior - rear engine		10	(United Kingdom) Denis Welch	Merlyn Mk5/7
2006	E	Grand Prix - rear engine	1954-1965	10	(United Kingdom) Nick Wigley	Cooper T51
2006	F	Formula 1	1966-1974	15	(United States) Duncan Dayton	Brabham BT33
2006	G	Formula 1	1975-1978	15	(United Kingdom) Martin Stretton	Tyrrell P34
2008	A	Grand Prix	Pre-1947	10	(United Kingdom) Julian Bronson	ERA R4D
2008	B	Grand Prix - front engine	Pre-1961	10	(United States) Duncan Dayton	Lotus 16
2008	C	Sports cars and sports prototypes	Pre-1953	10	(United Kingdom) John Ure	Frazer Nash Le Mans Replica (Mk2)
2008	D	Formula Junior		10	(United Kingdom) John Monson	BMC Mk1
2008	E	Grand Prix - rear engine	Pre-1966	10	(United Kingdom) Simon Hadfield	Lotus 21
2008	F	Formula 1 - 3 litre	Pre-1975	15	(United States) Duncan Dayton	Brabham BT33
2008	G	Formula 1 - 3 litre	1975-1978	15	(United States) Paul Edwards	Penske PC3
2010	A	Grand Prix	Pre-1947	10	(United Kingdom) Julian Bronson	ERA R4D
2010	B	Grand Prix - front engine	1947-1960	10	(United States) Duncan Dayton	Lotus 16
2010	C	Sports cars	Pre-1953	10	(Brazil) Carlos Monteverde	Jaguar C-Type
2010	D	Formula 3 – 1000 cm^{3}	1964-1970	9	(Switzerland) Christian Traber	Brabham BT21
2010	E	Grand Prix - rear engine	1954-1965	10	(United States) James King	Brabham BT7
2010	F	Formula 1	1966-1974	15	(United States) Duncan Dayton	Brabham BT33
2010	G	Formula 1	1975-1978	14	(United Kingdom) Bobby Verdon-Roe	McLaren M26
2010	H	Formula 3	1971-1973 (1600cc); 1974-1984 (2000cc)	10	(Italy) Emanuele Pirro	Martini Mk34
2012	A	Voiturettes and Grand Prix	Pre-1952	10	(United Kingdom) Julian Bronson	ERA R4D
2012	B	Formula 1 and Formula 2	Pre-1961	10	(New Zealand) Roger Wills	Cooper T51
2012	C	Sports cars and sports prototypes	Pre-1953	10	(United Kingdom) Alex Buncombe	Jaguar C-Type
2012	D	Grand Prix - rear engine	1961-1965	12	(United Kingdom) Andy Middlehurst	Lotus 25
2012	E	Formula 1 - 3 litre	1966-1972	18	(United States) Duncan Dayton	Brabham BT33
2012	F	Formula 1 - 3 litre	1973-1978	14	(United Kingdom) Michael Lyons	Hesketh 308E
2012	G	Formula 3 – 2000 cm^{3}	Pre-1985	10	(United Kingdom) Ben Barker	Lola T670
2014	A	Voiturettes and Grand Prix	Pre-war	10	(United Kingdom) Matthew Grist	Alfa Romeo P3
2014	B	Formula 1 and Formula 2	Pre-1961	8	(New Zealand) Roger Wills	Cooper T51
2014	C	Sports cars	1952-1955	10	(United Kingdom) Alex Buncombe	Jaguar C-Type
2014	D	Formula 1 – 1500 cm^{3}	1961-1965	12	(United Kingdom) Andy Middlehurst	Lotus 25
2014	E	Formula 1	1966-1972	16	(Japan) Katsuaki Kubota	Lotus 72
2014	F	Formula 1 - non ground effect	1973-1978	18	(United Kingdom) Michael Lyons	Hesketh 308E
2014	G	Formula 3 – 2000 cm^{3}	1974-1978	18	(Italy) Paolo Barilla	Chevron B34
2016	B	Formula 1 and Formula 2	Pre-1961	10	(United Kingdom) Tony Wood	Tec-Mec F415
2016	C	Sports cars	1952-1955	10	(United Kingdom) Chris Ward	Jaguar C-Type
2016	D	Formula Junior - front engine	1958-1960	10	(United Kingdom) Jonathon Hughes	Lola Mk2
2016	E	Formula 1 – 1500 cm^{3}	1961-1965	12	(United Kingdom) Andy Middlehurst	Lotus 25
2016	F	Formula 1	1966-1972	18	(United Kingdom) Stuart Hall	McLaren M19A
2016	G	Formula 1	1973-1976	17	(Italy) Alex Caffi	Ensign N176
2018	A	Grand Prix	Pre-war	10	(Republic of Ireland) Paddins Dowling	ERA R5B
2018	B	Formula 1 and Formula 2	Pre-1961	9	(United Kingdom) Tony Wood	Tec-Mec F415
2018	C	Sports cars - front engine	1952-1955	10	(United Kingdom) Chris Ward	Cooper T33 (Mk1)
2018	D	Formula 1	1961-1965	10	(United Kingdom) Andy Middlehurst	Lotus 25
2018	E	Formula 1	1966-1972	12	(Sweden) Björn Wirdheim	March 711
2018	F	Formula 1	1973-1976	18	(United Kingdom) Michael Lyons	McLaren M26
2018	G	Formula 1	1977-1980	18	(United Kingdom) Martin O'Connell	ATS D4
2021	A	Voiturettes and Grand Prix	Pre-war	10	(Switzerland) Christian Traber	Talbot-Lago T150C "MD"
2021	B	Formula 1 and Formula 2	Pre-1961	10	(Spain) Guillermo Fierro-Eleta	Maserati 250F
2021	C	Sports cars - front engine	1952-1957	10	(Spain) Guillermo Fierro-Eleta	Maserati 300S
2021	D	Formula 1 – 1500 cm^{3}	1961-1965	10	(United Kingdom) Mark Shaw	Lotus 21
2021	E	Formula 1 - 3 litre	1966-1972	12	(United Kingdom) Michael Lyons	Surtees TS9
2021	F	Formula 1 - 3 litre	1973-1976	17	(United Kingdom) Michael Lyons	McLaren M26
2021	G	Formula 1 - 3 litre	1977-1980	18	(United Kingdom) Michael Lyons	Hesketh 308E
2022	A1	Voiturettes and Grand Prix	Pre-war	7	(United Kingdom) Mark Gillies	ERA R3A
2022	A2	Formula 1 - front engine	Pre-1961	10	(Germany) Claudia Hürtgen	Ferrari 246
2022	B	Formula 1 – 1500 cm^{3} Formula 2	1961-1965; 1956-1960	10	(United States) Joe Colasacco	Ferrari 1512
2022	C	Sports cars - front engine	1952-1957	10	(United Kingdom) Frederic Wakeman	Cooper T38 (Mk2)
2022	D	Formula 1 - 3 litre	1966-1972	12	(United Kingdom) Stuart Hall	McLaren M19A
2022	E	Formula 1 - 3 litre	1973-1976	17	(United Kingdom) Stuart Hall	McLaren M23
2022	F	Formula 1 - 3 litre	1977-1980	18	(United Kingdom) Michael Lyons	Hesketh 308E
2022	G	Formula 1 - 3 litre	1981-1985	18	(Germany) Marco Werner	Lotus 87B
2024	A1	Voiturettes and Grand Prix	Pre-war	10	(Republic of Ireland) Paddins Dowling	ERA R5B
2024	A2	Formula 1 - front engine	Pre-1961	10	(Germany) Claudia Hürtgen	Ferrari Dino 246
2024	B	Formula 1 – 1500 cm^{3} Formula 2	1961-1965; 1956-1960	10	(United Kingdom) Andy Middlehurst	Lotus 25
2024	C	Sports cars - front engine	1952-1957	10	(United Kingdom) Max Smith-Hilliard	Lotus 10
2024	D	Formula 1 - 3 litre	1966-1972	12	(Japan) Katsuaki Kubota	Lotus 72
2024	E	Formula 1 - 3 litre	1973-1976	18	(United Kingdom) Stuart Hall	McLaren M23
2024	F	Formula 1 - 3 litre	1977-1980	5	(United Kingdom) Michael Lyons	Hesketh 308E
2024	G	Formula 1 - 3 litre	1981-1985	18	(United Kingdom) Stuart Hall	March 821
2026	A1	Voiturettes and Grand Prix	Pre-war	10	(United Kingdom) Patrick Blakeney-Edwards	Frazer-Nash Monoplace
2026	A2	Formula 1 - front engine	Pre-1961	10	(United Kingdom) Mark Shaw	Scarab F1
2026	B	Formula 1 – 1500 cm^{3} Formula 2	1961-1965</>1956-1960	10	(United States) Joseph Colasacco	Ferrari 1512
2026	C	Sports cars - front engine	1952-1957	10	(United Kingdom) Richard Wilson	Maserati 250S
2026	D	Formula 1 - 3 litre	1966-1972	12	(United Kingdom) Michael Lyons	Surtees TS9
2026	E	Formula 1 - 3 litre	1973-1976	18	(United Kingdom) Stuart Hall	McLaren M23
2026	F	Formula 1 - 3 litre	1977-1980	18	(United Kingdom) Michael Lyons	Hesketh 308E
2026	G	Formula 1 - 3 litre	1981-1985	18	(United Kingdom) Stuart Hall	March 821
