= 2004 Historic Grand Prix of Monaco =

← Previous race	Next race →
- Circuit de Monaco

Race details
- Date: 15–16 May 2004
- Official name: 4e Grand Prix de Monaco Historique
- Location: Circuit de Monaco
- Course: Street circuit
- Course length: 3.340 km (2.075 miles)

The 2004 Historic Grand Prix of Monaco was the fourth running of the Historic Grand Prix of Monaco, a motor racing event for heritage Grand Prix, Voiturettes, Formula One, Formula Two and Sports cars.

== Report ==
The event featured former Formula One drivers Phil Hill, Stirling Moss and Roberto Mieres.

Festivities included the official opening of a new pit complex.

In Race B, Philip Walker started from the back of the grid due to mechanical issues in practice. He put on a strong recovery drive to finish sixth.

== Results ==
=== Summary ===
Série	Cars	Years	Pole position		Fastest lap		Race winner
A	Grand Prix	Pre-1947	(United Kingdom) John Ure	2:02.989	(United Kingdom) Irvine Laidlaw	2:03.140	(United Kingdom) John Ure
B	Grand Prix - front engine	1947-1960	(Spain) Joaquín Folch-Rusiñol	1:56.259	(United States) Duncan Dayton	1:55.880	(United States) Duncan Dayton
C	Sports cars	Pre-1953	(France) Flavien Marcais	2:08.009	(France) Flavien Marcais	2:07.599	(France) Flavien Marcais
D	Formula Junior - front engine		(United States) Joe Colasacco	2:04.368	(United Kingdom) Robin Longdon	2:02.808	(United States) Joe Colasacco
E	Grand Prix - rear engine	1954-1965	(France) Flavien Marcais	1:54.408	(United States) Duncan Dayton	1:55.806	(United States) Duncan Dayton
F	Formula 1	1966-1976	(United Kingdom) Martin Stretton	1:35.743	(United States) Danny Baker	1:40.137	(United Kingdom) Martin Stretton

=== Série A: Pre 1947 Grand Prix Cars ===
Pos.	No.	Driver	Car	Year	Laps	Time/retired	Grid
1	27	(United Kingdom) John Ure	ERA B	1936	10	20:57.916	1
2	21	(Germany) Stefan Schollwoeck	Maserati 6CM	1937	10	+15.709	
3	2	(United Kingdom) Irvine Laidlaw	Maserati 6CM	1937	10	+19.108	
4	1	(United Kingdom) Gary Pearson	Alfa Romeo 12C	1937	10	+44.366	
5	26	(Switzerland) Jost Wildbolz	ERA B	1935	10	+45.553	
6	28	(United Kingdom) Matt Grist	Alfa Romeo P3	1934	10	+46.784	
7	19	(United Kingdom) Julian Bronson	ERA B	1937	10	+51.845	
8	22	(Switzerland) Michael Gans	Bugatti 35B	1928	10	+1:52.926	
9	14	(Netherlands) Bart Rosman	Bugatti 35C	1929	10	+2:15.968	
10	30	(Germany) Robert Fink	Alfa Romeo P3	1932	9	+1 lap	
11	29	(United Kingdom) Richard Last	MG K3	1933/36	9	+1 lap	
12	6	(France) Jean-Jacques Strub	Bugatti 35/51	1926	9	+1 lap	
13	11	(Switzerland) Georg Kaufmann	Maserati 4CL	1939	9	+1 lap	
14	18	(United Kingdom) Peter Neumark	Alfa Romeo 8C Monza	1932	9	+1 lap	
15	7	(United States) Ed Davies	Alfa Romeo 8C Monza	1932	9	+1 lap	
16	10	(Germany) Oliver Maierhofer	Maserati 4CL	1946	9	+1 lap	
17	15	(United States) Warren Spieker	Alfa Romeo P3	1932	9	+1 lap	
18	4	(Switzerland) Urs Müller	Maserati 6CM	1938	9	+1 lap	
19	9	(Switzerland) Christophe Burckhardt	Bugatti 37/44	1927/35	9	+1 lap	
20	12	(United States) Tom Price	Alta	1936	9	+1 lap	
21	5	(Monaco) Jean-Claude Miloe	Delage 1500	1927	9	+1 lap	
22	34	(United States) Bruce McCaw	Alfa Romeo 8C Monza	1931	8	+2 laps	
23	52	(United Kingdom) Bill Ainscough	Maserati 26M	1930	8	+2 laps	
24	3	(Netherlands) Marcel Sontrop	Bugatti 37	1927	8	+2 laps	
25	32	(United Kingdom) Julia de Baldanza	Bugatti 35B	1929	8	+2 laps	
26	24	(France) François Rinaldi	Bugatti 35	1925	8	+2 laps	
27	33	(France) Philippe Douchet de Rouère	MG K3	1934	8	+2 laps	
28	8	(France) Ralf Emmerling	Riley Brooklands	1928	7	+3 laps	
29	17	(United Kingdom) Antony Stephens	ERA B	1936	4	+6 laps	
30	16	(United States) Ian Landy	Bugatti 35B	1927	4	+6 laps	
DNS	23	(United Kingdom) William Binnie	Maserati 6CM	1936			
DNS	31	(Germany) Wolfgang Wegner-Bscher	Maserati 4CL	1939			

=== Série B: Front Engine Grand Prix Cars (1947 - 1960) ===
Pos.	No.	Driver	Car	Year	Laps	Time/retired	Grid
1	9	(United States) Duncan Dayton	Lotus 16	1959	10	19:56.618	
2	5	(Spain) Joaquín Folch-Rusiñol	Lotus 16	1959	10	+1.576	1
3	10	(Germany) Dr. Thomas Bscher	Maserati 250F	1958	10	+34.718	
4	7	(United Kingdom) Martin Stretton	Ferrari 555 "Supersqualo"	1955	10	+42.352	
5	23	(United Kingdom) Barrie Baxter	Tec-Mec	1959	10	+44.860	
6	40	(United Kingdom) Philip Walker	Lotus 16	1959	10	+1:02.531	
7	14	(United Kingdom) Barrie Williams	Connaught A4	1952	10	+1:13.697	
8	34	(Germany) Michael Hinderer	Maserati 250F	1955	10	+2:00.976	
9	17	(United Kingdom) Peter Neumark	Maserati 250F	1957	10	+2:02.033	
10	28	(Switzerland) Peter Heuberger	Maserati 250F	1956	9	+1 lap	
11	20	(United Kingdom) Ian Nuthall	Alta F2	1952	9	+1 lap	
12	18	(Italy) Gigi Baulino	Maserati 250F	1954	9	+1 lap	
13	12	(Italy) Giancarlo Casoli	Maserati 250F	1956	9	+1 lap	
14	21	(United Kingdom) Chris Drake	Maserati 250F	1958	9	+1 lap	
15	6	(United Kingdom) Graham Burrows	Cooper T23	1953	9	+1 lap	
16	48	(Switzerland) Max Lustenberger	Maserati 4CLT	1948	9	+1 lap	
17	1	(France) Jean-Jacques Bally	Gordini T15	1948	9	+1 lap	
18	3	(United Kingdom) David Bennett	Maserati A6GCM	1953/54	9	+1 lap	
19	25	(United Kingdom) Julia de Baldanza	Maserati A6GCM	1951	8	+2 laps	
20	19	(Austria) Winfried Kallinger	Cisitalia D46	1947	8	+2 laps	
21	15	(Belgium) Paul Grant	Cooper T23 (Mk2)	1953	6	+4 laps	
22	16	(France) François Delingy	Gordini T11	1946/50	2	+8 laps	
DNS	2	(Portugal) José Manuel Albuquerque	Maserati 250F	1954			
DNS	4	(United Kingdom) Michael Steele	Connaught C	1956/57			
DNS	8	(United Kingdom) Nick Wigley	Connaught B	1954			
DNS	11	(United States) Tom Price	Maserati 250F	1956			

=== Série C: Pre 1953 Sports Cars ===
Pos.	No.	Driver	Car	Year	Laps	Time/retired	Grid
1	7	(France) Flavien Marcais	Jaguar C-Type	1952	10	22:09.830	1
2	28	(United Kingdom) John Ure	Frazer Nash Le Mans Replica (Mk2)	1952	10	+1.730	
3	11	(United Kingdom) Richard Pilkington	Talbot-Lago T26GS	1950	10	+3.335	
4	29	(United Kingdom) Nigel Webb	Jaguar C-Type	1952	10	+27.205	
5	8	(Netherlands) Jos Koster	Maserati A6GCS	1952	10	+53.915	
6	16	(United Kingdom) Eddie McGuire	Gordini T15S/23S	1949/52	10	+56.332	
7	2	(Germany) Wolfgang Friedrichs	Aston Martin DB3	1952	10	+1:22.086	
8	32	(Germany) Thomas Feierabend	BMW 328	1937	10	+1:34.258	
9	6	(United Kingdom) David Franklin	Frazer Nash BMW 328/1	1938	10	+1:38.167	
10	18	(United Kingdom) Patrick Blakeney-Edwards	BMW 328	1937	10	+1:50.350	
11	23	(Germany) Paul Singer	Veritas RS	1948	10	+4:15.671	
12	12	(United States) Thomas Mittler	OSCA MT4	1951	9	+1 lap	
13	1	(United Kingdom) Neil Hadfield	Jaguar C-Type	1952	9	+1 lap	
14	20	(Spain) Juan Quintano	Ferrari 166 MM	1950	9	+1 lap	
15	15	(United Kingdom) Philip Champion	Frazer Nash Mille Miglia	1951	9	+1 lap	
16	14	(Switzerland) Max Lustenberger	Talbot-Lago T26GS	1950	9	+1 lap	
17	26	(Argentina) Roberto Mieres	Allard J2	1951	9	+1 lap	
18	10	(United States) Stephen Dudley	Ferrari 166/195 S	1950	9	+1 lap	
19	27	(United Kingdom) Jo Bamford	Ferrari 340 America	1952	9	+1 lap	
20	34	(United States) Ed Davies	Ferrari 166 MM	1950	9	+1 lap	
21	3	(Spain) Jose Fernandez	Frazer Nash Le Mans Replica	1950	9	+1 lap	
22	4	(Spain) Carlos de Miguel	OSCA MT4	1949	9	+1 lap	
23	9	(France) Antoine Midy	Ferrari 212 Export	1951	9	+1 lap	
24	31	(Switzerland) Erich Traber	Ferrari 212 Export	1950	8	+2 laps	
25	19	(United Kingdom) David Wenman	Jaguar C-Type	1952	6	+4 laps	
26	17	(United States) Phil Hill	Alfa Romeo 3000 CM	1952	5	+5 laps	
27	21	(United Kingdom) James Wood	Frazer Nash Le Mans Replica	1950	5	+5 laps	
28	5	(Belgium) Marc Devis	Maserati A6GCS	1947	5	+5 laps	
29	30	(United States) Murray Smith	Frazer Nash Le Mans Replica (Mk1)	1951	5	+5 laps	
30	35	(United Kingdom) Stirling Moss	Jaguar C-Type	1952	3	+7 laps	
31	24	(France) Antoine Blasco	OSCA MT4	1952	2	+8 laps	
DNS	22	(United Kingdom) Mary Grant-Jonkers	Cisitalia 202 MM	1947			
DNS	25	(United Kingdom) Frank Sytner	Frazer Nash Le Mans Replica	1950			
DNS	33	(Germany) Michael Willms	Ferrari 225 S	1951			

=== Série D: Formula Junior - Front engine ===
Pos.	No.	Driver	Car	Year	Laps	Time/retired	Grid
1	17	(United States) Joe Colasacco	Stanguellini FJ	1959	10	21:28.739	1
2	27	(United Kingdom) John Monson	BMC Mk1	1960	10	+4.388	
3	35	(Italy) Simone Stanguellini	Stanguellini FJ	1960	10	+10.284	
4	31	(Denmark) Erik Justesen	U2 Mk2	1960	10	+14.744	4
5	24	(United Kingdom) Clive Wilson	Lola Mk2	1960	10	+15.409	
6	2	(United Kingdom) Tony Goodwin	Gemini FJ	1959	10	+20.640	
7	19	(Germany) Heinz Stege	Elva FJ	1959	10	+23.542	6
8	22	(United Kingdom) John Truslove	Elva FJ	1960	10	+27.412	
9	23	(United States) Warren Spieker	Lola Mk2	1960	10	+1:05.045	
10	30	(United Kingdom) Duncan Rabagliati	Alexis FJ	1959	10	+1:16.151	
11	14	(United Kingdom) William Grimshaw	Moorland FJ	1959	10	+1:26.407	
12	20	(United Kingdom) Peter Mullen	OSCA FJ	1960	10	+1:28.608	
13	21	(Germany) Dietrich Merkel	Lola Mk2	1959	10	+1:32.289	
14	4	(Italy) Tommaso Gelmini	Volpini FJ	1959/61	10	+1:33.052	
15	9	(United Kingdom) Roger Earl	OSCA FJ	1959	10	+2:16.031	2
16	11	(United Kingdom) Crispian Besley	OSCA FJ	1960	10	+2:16.335	
17	5	(South Africa) Richard Daggitt	Scorpion FJ	1960	9	+1 lap	
18	26	(United Kingdom) Michael Ashley-Brown	Volpini FJ	1958	9	+1 lap	
19	25	(United States) Marvin Primack	P.L.W. FJ	1959	9	+1 lap	
20	34	(United Kingdom) Chris Featherstone	Bond FJ	1960	9	+1 lap	
21	33	(Italy) Franco Beolchi	Apache FJ	1959	9	+1 lap	
22	3	(France) Marc Coschieri	Stanguellini FJ	1959	9	+1 lap	
23	29	(New Zealand) Geoffrey Manning	Volpini FJ	1958	9	+1 lap	
24	18	(Japan) Yasuhito Fukuda	Stanguellini FJ	1959	9	+1 lap	
25	15	(United Kingdom) Ian Robinson	Autosud FJ	1959	9	+1 lap	
26	1	(United Kingdom) Robin Longdon	Lola FJ	1960	8	+2 laps	
27	7	(United States) Alan Patterson	Elva FJ	1959	8	+2 laps	
28	16	(Italy) Matteo Panini	Stanguellini FJ	1960	5	+5 laps	8
29	8	(United Kingdom) David Watts	Elva FJ	1959	5	+5 laps	
30	6	(Italy) Daniele Salodini	Taraschi FJ	1960	3	+7 laps	
31	28	(Italy) Fabio Verin	Volpini FJ	1958	2	+8 laps	
DNS	10	(Italy) Jason Wright	Stanguellini FJ	1959			
DNS	32	(Denmark) Jac Nellemann	Alfa Dana FJ	1959			

=== Série E: Rear Engined Grand Prix Cars (1954-1965) ===
Pos.	No.	Driver	Car	Year	Laps	Time/retired	Grid
1	16	(United States) Duncan Dayton	Brabham BT11	1964	10	19:41.982	
2	31	(France) Flavien Marcais	Lotus 21	1962	10	+7.585	1
3	2	(United States) Danny Baker	Lotus 24	1962	10	+24.971	
4	15	(Monaco) Marcus Mussa	Lotus 18	1960	10	+27.346	
5	26	(Germany) Peter Wuensch	BRM P261	1964	10	+1:07.915	
6	1	(United Kingdom) Roy Walzer	Brabham BT11	1964	10	+1:19.519	
7	25	(United Kingdom) Dan Collins	LDS F1	1961	10	+1:35.826	
8	11	(United States) Howard Cherry	Lola Mk4	1962	10	+1:40.627	
9	34	(Belgium) André Wanty	Lotus 18/21	1961	10	+1:55.937	
10	27	(United Kingdom) Anthony Hancock	Cooper T45	1957	10	+2:02.198	
11	28	(Italy) Jason Wright	ATS 100	1962	9	+1 lap	
12	20	(United Kingdom) Marshall Bailey	JBW Type 1	1959	9	+1 lap	
13	4	(Italy) Marco Antonucci	LDS F1	1963	9	+1 lap	
14	3	(United Kingdom) Brian Anthony Ashby	Emeryson F1	1961	9	+1 lap	
15	29	(United States) Douglas Mockett	Cooper T53	1961	9	+1 lap	
16	24	(Germany) Richard Weiland	Lotus 24	1962	9	+1 lap	
17	12	(Australia) Richard Longes	Cooper T43	1957	9	+1 lap	
18	9	(Italy) Paolo Gecchelin	Lotus 18	1959	9	+1 lap	
19	17	(Argentina) Jorge Ferioli	Lola Mk4	1962	8	+2 laps	
20	32	(Netherlands) Adrien van der Kroft	Cooper T51	1959	8	+2 laps	
21	23	(United States) Kurt DelBene	BRP-BRM	1964	6	+4 laps	
22	22	(Germany) Dieter Streve-Mühlens	Lotus 24	1962	4	+6 laps	
23	21	(United Kingdom) Richard Hope	Cooper T51	1959	2	+8 laps	
24	19	(United Kingdom) Sidney Hoole	Cooper T66	1963	1	+9 laps	
25	14	(United Kingdom) Alan Baillie	Cooper T71/73	1964	1	+9 laps	
26	30	(United Kingdom) Frank Mountain	Lotus 21	1961	1	+9 laps	
DNS	6	(United States) James King	Brabham BT7	1963			
DNS	7	(Germany) Dr. Thomas Bscher	BRM P261	1964			
DNS	8	(Italy) Marco Cajani	De Tomaso F1	1961			
DNS	18	(United Kingdom) David Clark	BRM P57	1961			

=== Série F: Formula 1 Grand Prix Cars (1966 - 1976) ===
Pos.	No.	Driver	Car	Year	Laps	Time/retired	Grid
1	34	(United Kingdom) Martin Stretton	Tyrrell P34	1976	15	25:37.376	1
2	36	(United Kingdom) Frank Sytner	Penske PC3	1975/76	15	+12.482	
3	18	(Portugal) Rodrigo Gallego	March 761	1976	15	+19.419	
4	24	(United States) John Delane	Tyrrell 001	1970	15	+36.939	
5	6	(United States) Ryan Delane	Tyrrell 006	1972	15	+37.248	
6	27	(United Kingdom) Malcolm Carter	March 711	1971	15	+55.803	
7	16	(United States) Danny Baker	Shadow DN5	1975	15	+1:23.962	
8	22	(United Kingdom) Robert Lamplough	March 711	1971	15	+1:28.873	
9	15	(United Kingdom) David Clark	McLaren M19	1971	15	+1:29.372	
10	9	(Japan) Junro Nishida	Lotus 49B	1968	15	+1:38.169	
11	25	(United Kingdom) Paul Alexander	BRM P201	1974	14	+1 lap	
12	29	(United Kingdom) Lorina McLaughlin	McLaren M23	1974	14	+1 lap	
13	19	(United States) Brad Krause	BRM P180	1972	14	+1 lap	
14	2	(United Kingdom) Alistair Morrison	Lotus 72	1971	14	+1 lap	
15	20	(Monaco) Yves Saguato	Matra MS120C	1971	14	+1 lap	
16	12	(United Kingdom) Peter Austin	Surtees TS9	1971	13	+2 laps	
17	5	(United States) Robert Baker	Brabham BT33	1970	13	+2 laps	
18	26	(United Kingdom) Ron Maydon	Cooper T86C	1968	13	+2 laps	
19	33	(Republic of Ireland) Ean Pugh	BRM P133	1968	11	+4 laps	
20	7	(United Kingdom) Sidney Hoole	Cooper T86B	1968	3	+12 laps	
21	3	(Italy) Andrea Burani	Tyrrell P34	1976	2	+13 laps	
22	37	(France) Flavien Marcais	Brabham BT26	1968/69	1	+14 laps	
DNS	1	(United Kingdom) Sean Walker	Lotus 72E	1970			
DNS	10	(Netherlands) Nico Bindels	Lotus 77	1976			
DNS	14	(Switzerland) Hubertus Bahlsen	Brabham BT45	1976			
DNS	18	(Portugal) Rodrigo Gallego	March 761	1976			
DNS	23	(United States) Louis Sellyei	Eagle Mk1	1966			
DNS	28	(Italy) Mauro Bompani	March 701	1970			
DNS	32	(Spain) Joaquín Folch-Rusiñol	McLaren M23	1974			
DNS	35	(France) Jean-Louis Duret	March 761	1976			
