= Ferrari 212 =

Ferrari used its 2.6 L (2562.51 cc) Colombo V12 engine in a number of models, all called 212 for the displacement of a single cylinder.

The following models used the 212 name:

- 1951 Ferrari 212 F1 — Formula 1 and Formula 2 racer
- 1951 Ferrari 212 MM — racing berlinetta
- 1951 Ferrari 212 Export — racing barchetta and coupé
- 1951 Ferrari 212 Inter — grand tourer
