= Maserati 250S =

Italian race car

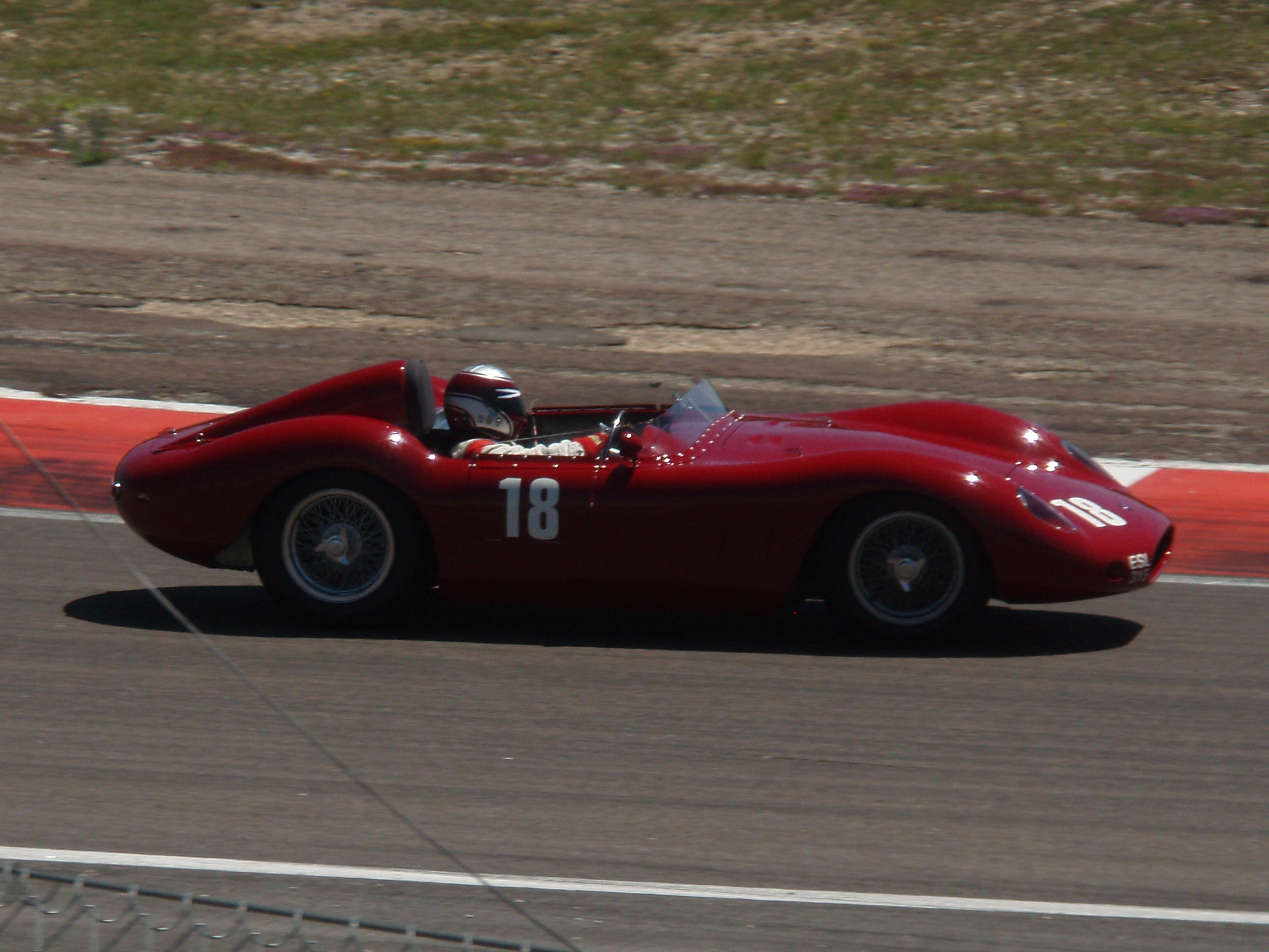
- Constructor: Maserati
- Designer(s): Fantuzzi
- Production: 1954–1957 (two produced)

Technical specifications
- Chassis: Steel tubular spaceframe, aluminum body
- Suspension (front): Double wishbones, coil springs, Houdaille hydraulic shock absorbers
- Suspension (rear): DeDion axle, transverse semi-elliptic leaf spring, Houdaille hydraulic shock absorbers
- Length: 3,900–4,150 mm (153.5–163.4 in)
- Width: 1,450 mm (57.1 in)
- Height: 980 mm (38.6 in)
- Axle track: 1,300 mm (51.2 in) (front); 1,250 mm (49.2 in) (rear)
- Wheelbase: 2,150–2,310 mm (84.6–90.9 in)
- Engine: 2,494 cc (2.5 L) Maserati 250S straight-4 Front-engine, rear-wheel-drive 0-door speedster
- Transmission: 4/5-speed synchromesh manual
- Weight: 660–760 kg (1,460–1,680 lb)

Competition history

The Maserati 250S, and its derivative and version, the 250 Sport, are sports racing cars, designed, developed and built by Italian car manufacturer Maserati, between 1954 and 1957. Only two models were produced.

== Development history and technology ==
The 250S was an attempt by Maserati engineers to improve the performance of the 200S. To this end, the 2-liter in-line 4-cylinder engine was brought to 2.5-liter displacement by increasing the bore and stroke to 96 × 86 mm. In addition to reboring the block, a new crankshaft was also designed. The result was sobering, as the engine only delivered 6 hp more power than the two-liter unit. The chassis and engineering were carried over from the 200S racing version, the 200SI, making these two Maserati models indistinguishable from the outside. Four 200SI chassis became 250S this way.

=== 250S (1954) ===
The first version, also known as 2500 Sport, was built in a single example and was obtained from a chassis type A6GCS/53 on which the 2,500 cc (150 cu in) six-cylinder engine of the 250F of Formula 1 was mounted, suitably adapted to the regulations of the cars. sport. He participated in some races of the 1954 season, such as the Mille Miglia and the Supercortemaggiore Grand Prix of Monza, but without obtaining significant results. The car was then shelved, to develop the new 300S.

The engine was a 2494 cc straight six-cylinder. The bore of the cylinders was 84 mm (3.3 in) while the stroke was 75 mm (3.0 in). It had a double overhead camshaft. Three Weber 42 DCO3 type carburetors were installed.

The brake was a four-wheel hydraulically operated drum brake. The front suspension was a coil spring with Houdaille hydraulic shock absorbers and a stabilizer bar. The rear ones with transverse leaf springs, Houdaille hydraulic shock absorbers, and a stabilizer bar.

A trellis structure was used for the frame. The body was made of aluminum.

The project gained new vigor in 1956 when a model of the car was assembled in Modena; it was an A6 GCS with the particularity of having the De Dion bridge on the rear suspension and the gearbox in the block with the differential. He participated in competitions in Agadir and Dakar, but with no luck. The car was later used by Stirling Moss for tests in preparation for the Mille Miglia.

=== 250S (1957) ===
The second iteration of the 250S was born in 1957, with a radically different design. In this case, it was the mechanics of the 200SI with the larger 4-cylinder engine. Four examples were built: the intent was to maintain the agility of the two-liter sports car but with more power to take on the larger displacement rivals. The debut took place during the tests of the 1000 km in Buenos Aires: the performances were promising, but it was still judged unripe for use in the race. The internal competition of the 300S and, at the end of the season, the withdrawal from the competition of the Maserati factory team marked the decline of this car. [2]Nevertheless, some engines were produced to be supplied to the client teams to upgrade the existing 200SI. In particular, between 1958 and 1959, the 250S achieved notable results in the SCCA national races in North America.

The engine was a 2,489 cc (151.9 cu in) in-line four-cylinder engine. The bore of the cylinders was 96 mm (3.8 in) while the stroke was 86 mm (3.4 in). It had a double overhead camshaft. Two Weber 45 DCO3 type carburetors were installed.

The brake was a four-wheel hydraulically operated drum brake. The front suspension was a coil spring with Houdaille hydraulic shock absorbers and a stabilizer bar. The rear ones with transverse leaf springs, Houdaille hydraulic shock absorbers, and a stabilizer bar.

A trellis structure was used for the frame. The body was made of aluminum.

== Racing and competitive history ==
The 250S were driven in sports car races both in Europe and in the United States of America. Surprisingly, there are 250S in the entry and start lists for the 1954 Le Mans 24 Hours and the Monza 1000 km of the same year. For the 250S in Le Mans, a 2.9-liter 6-cylinder in-line engine is specified as the unit. In Monza, it is said to have been the 2.5-liter 4-cylinder in-line engine. Since these charges contradict other sources, it cannot be clarified with certainty which Maserati models were involved. The same applies to the 250S at the 1956 Agadir and Senegal Grand Prix.

The race starts between 1957 and 1964 is documented. At the 12-hour race at Sebring in 1957, Roy Salvadori and Carroll Shelby started in factory 250S. The team was disqualified after 68 laps for illegal refueling. The first finish was in 1957 at the Nassau Trophy, where Stephen Spitler was 21st. A year later, Jim Hall celebrated his first victory in a sports car race at Eagle Mountain.

Alongside this success was a second race win with the 250S, clinched at a minor race in the USA.
