= Automobili Stanguellini =

Italian sport car company

Coordinates: 44.6361107°N 10.9480236°E

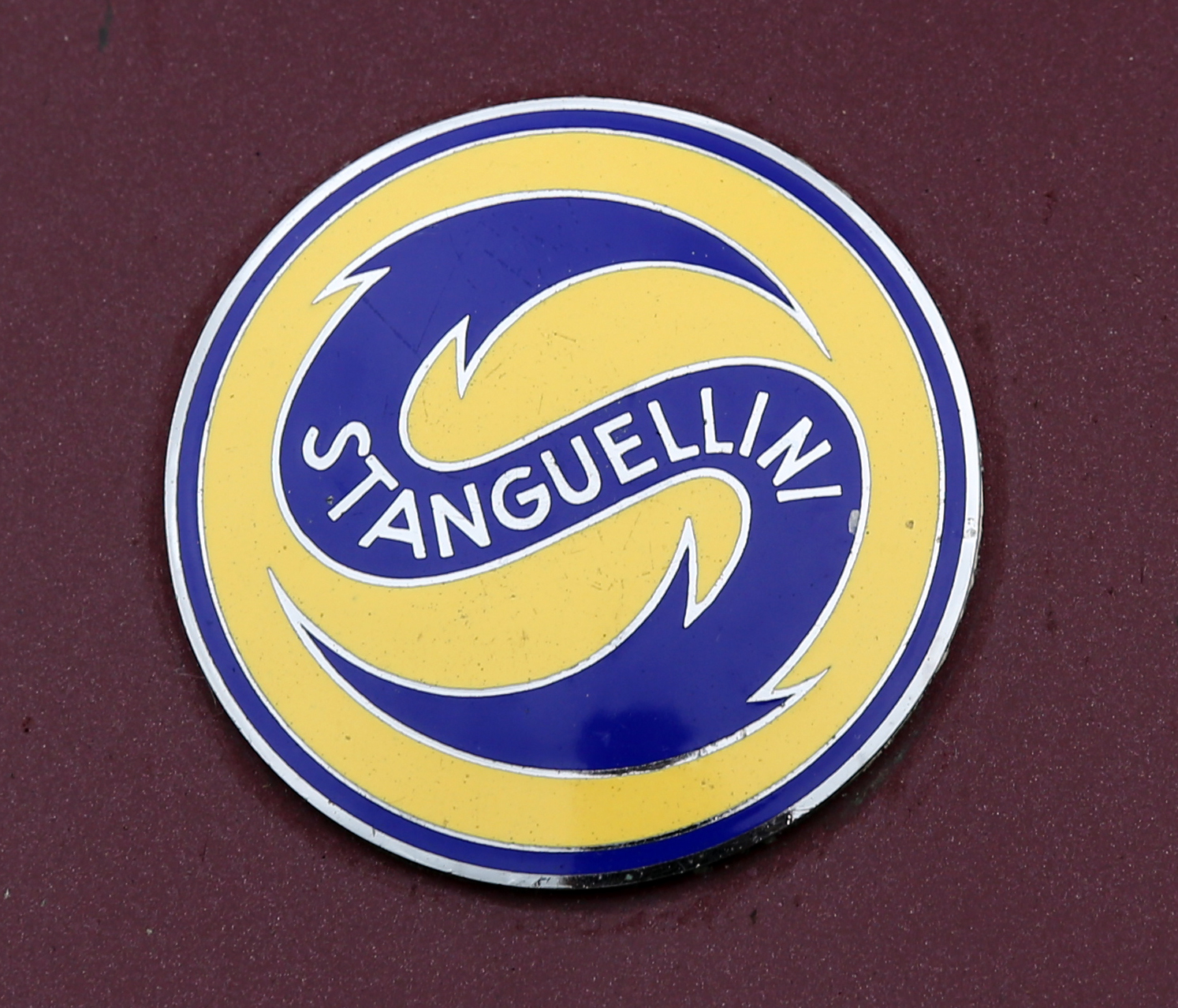
- Industry: Automotive
- Founded: 1900
- Headquarters: Modena, Italy
- Key people: Vittorio Stanguellini, Francesco Stanguellini
- Products: Racing cars

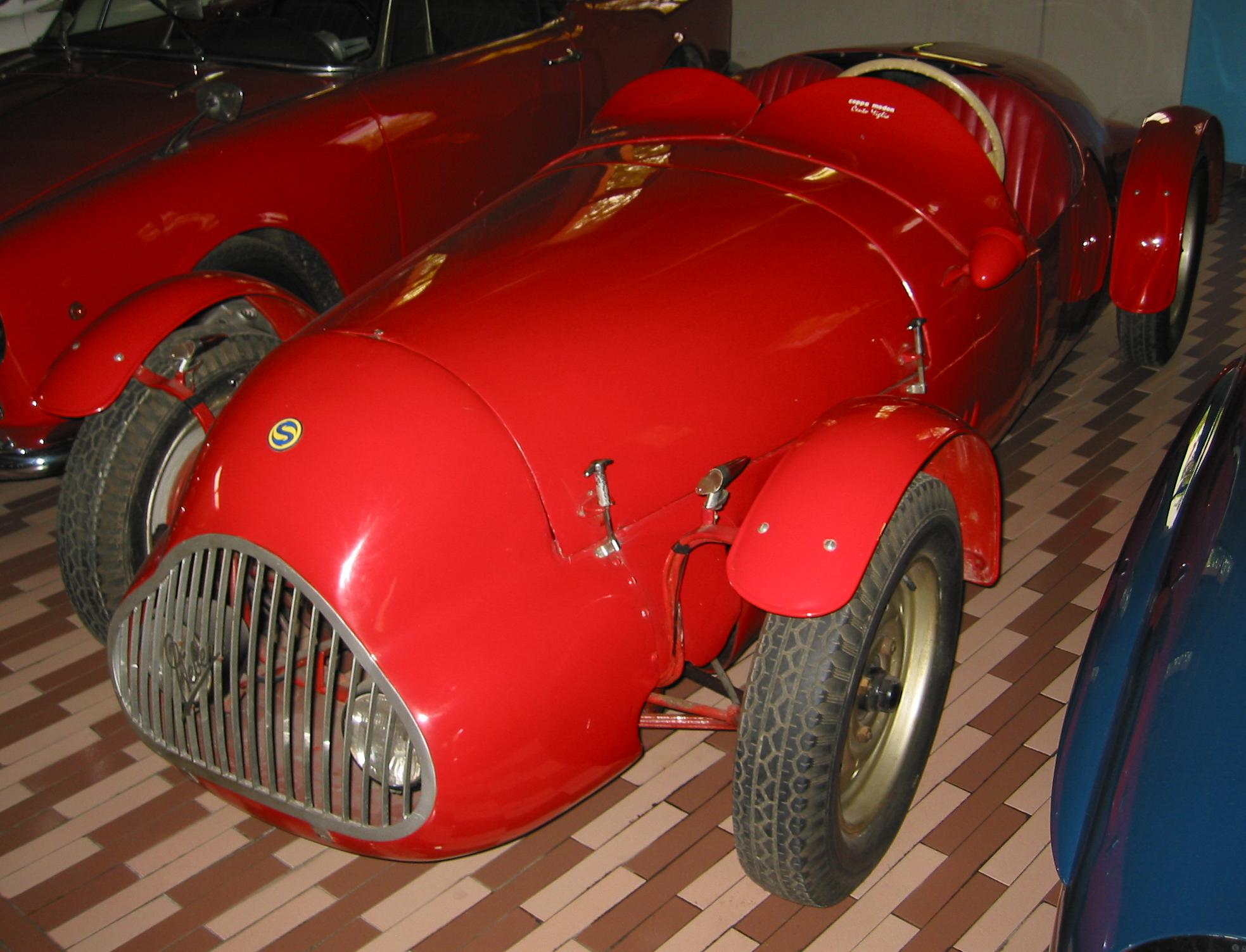
Stanguellini 2 seater.

Automobili Stanguellini was an Italian sport cars manufacturer based in Modena. The company was founded by Vittorio Stanguellini and was mostly active between 1946 and 1960. They produced racing cars until 1981, when Vittorio Stanguellini died. Since then, the company has been run by his son Francesco and offers service for the restoration, maintenance and operation of historic racing cars.

== History ==
The Stanguellini family had a long involvement with motor racing. Vittorio's grandfather founded an engineering company in 1879, and his father was the first individual to register a car in Modena in 1910. (The plate registration was "MO 1"). By the time Vittorio took over in 1929, the family business included a FIAT dealership.

A passionate racer, Stanguellini began tuning and modifying Alfa Romeo, Fiat and Maserati cars for racing. Despite being a competitor, he developed a friendly rivalry with Enzo Ferrari in the late 1920s, the latter seeing the presence of Stanguellini as a potential reinforcement for the racing cars scene in Modena. Vittorio's next step was to start Squadra Corse Stanguellini. The team quickly found success running modified Maseratis 6CM and won the 1938 edition of Targa Florio.

=== Racing ===
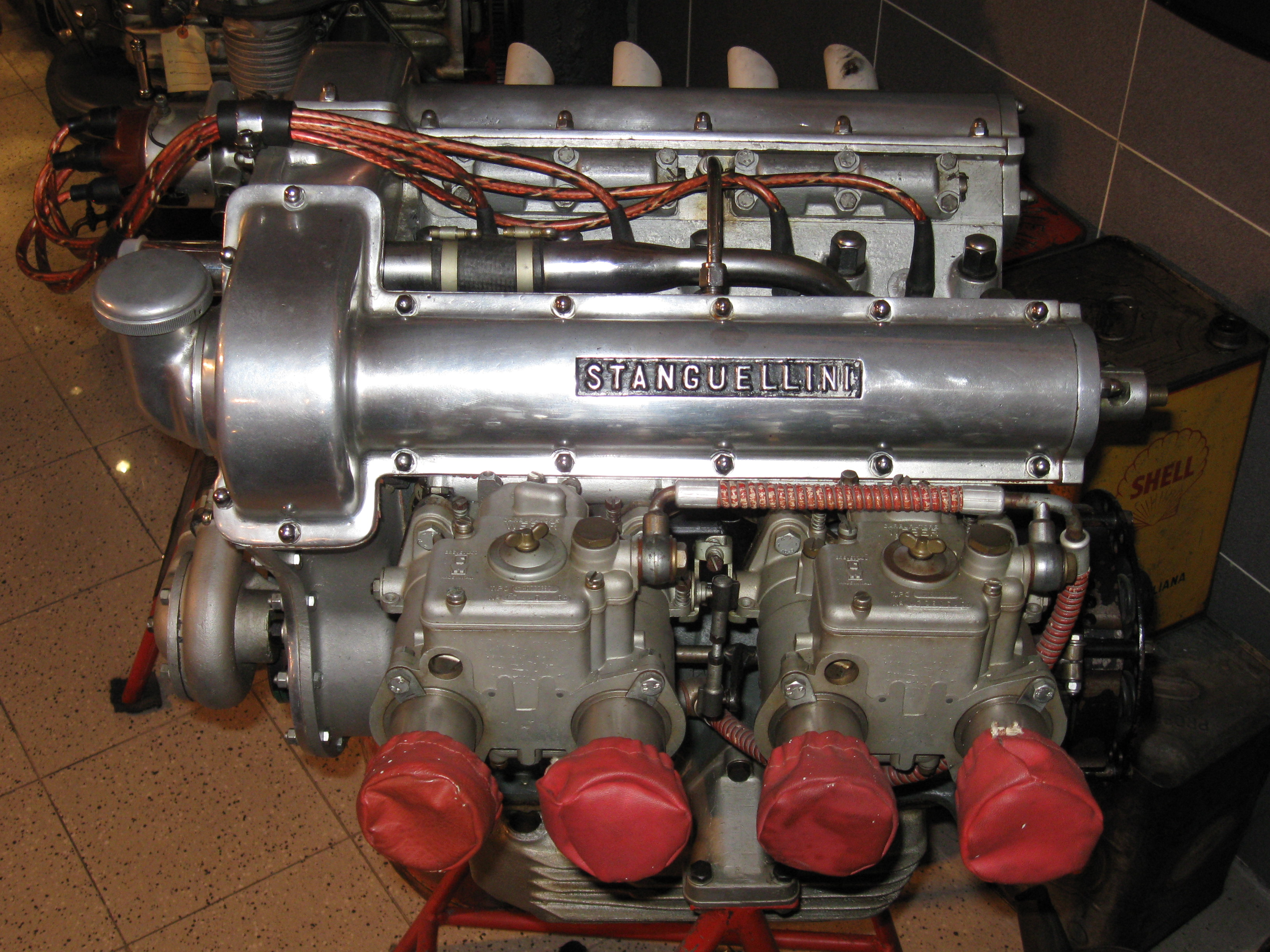
A Stanguellini racing engine.

Over the course of four decades Stanguellini's cars competed in many sports car racing events, including the 1957 24 Hours of Le Mans). The team prevalently used FIAT components and focused on the 750 & 1100 cc classes, winning numerous National races in the process. The cars were conspicuous for being elegantly engineered, with light-alloy cylinder blocks, twin overhead camshafts (bialbero) and dual side-draught Weber carburettors. This would add up to a claimed 60 bhp (40 kW) at 7500 rpm from the 741 cc sports engine and 90 bhp (70 kW) at 7000 rpm from the larger engine, providing top speeds of around 180 km/h (110 mph) and 190 km/h (120 mph) respectively.

Unlike many other of the so-called "Etceterinis", Stanguellini always refused to use foreign parts, instead relying on Fiat as much as possible. The bodywork was usually made by the local Carrozzeria Reggiano.

Despite his best efforts, Stanguellini never managed to win the 24 Hours of Le Mans due to his limited resources. His best finish was a fourth in class in 1959.

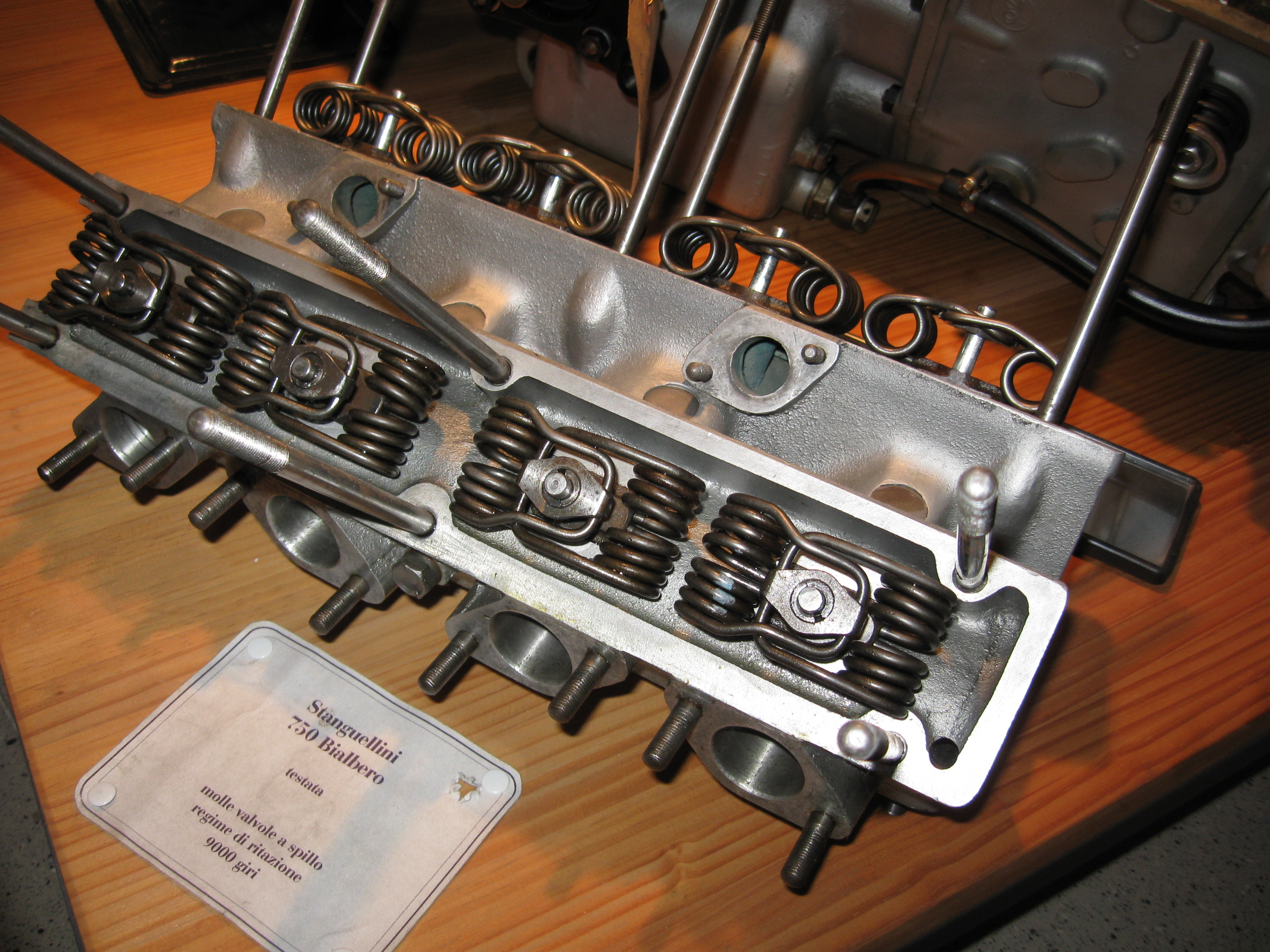
Stanguellini 750cc cylinder head - note the dual hairpin valve springs

=== The Stanguellini 750cc Racing Engine ===
Stanguellini had been making special aluminium twin-cam cylinder heads for the Fiat 1100 block since 1947 and in 1950, he completed his most ambitious project – a complete 750cc racing engine designed by Oberdan Golfieri, an engineer from Romagna who would collaborate with Minardi a few years later. This was a lightweight 9000 rpm engine based on a specially cast aluminium block and heads. The engine proved to be successful and Stanguellini racing cars went on to win numerous national championships in Italy and France. Briggs Cunningham purchased a 750cc twin-cam car which he raced in the United States, along with a Stanguellini Formula Junior.

=== Major race wins ===
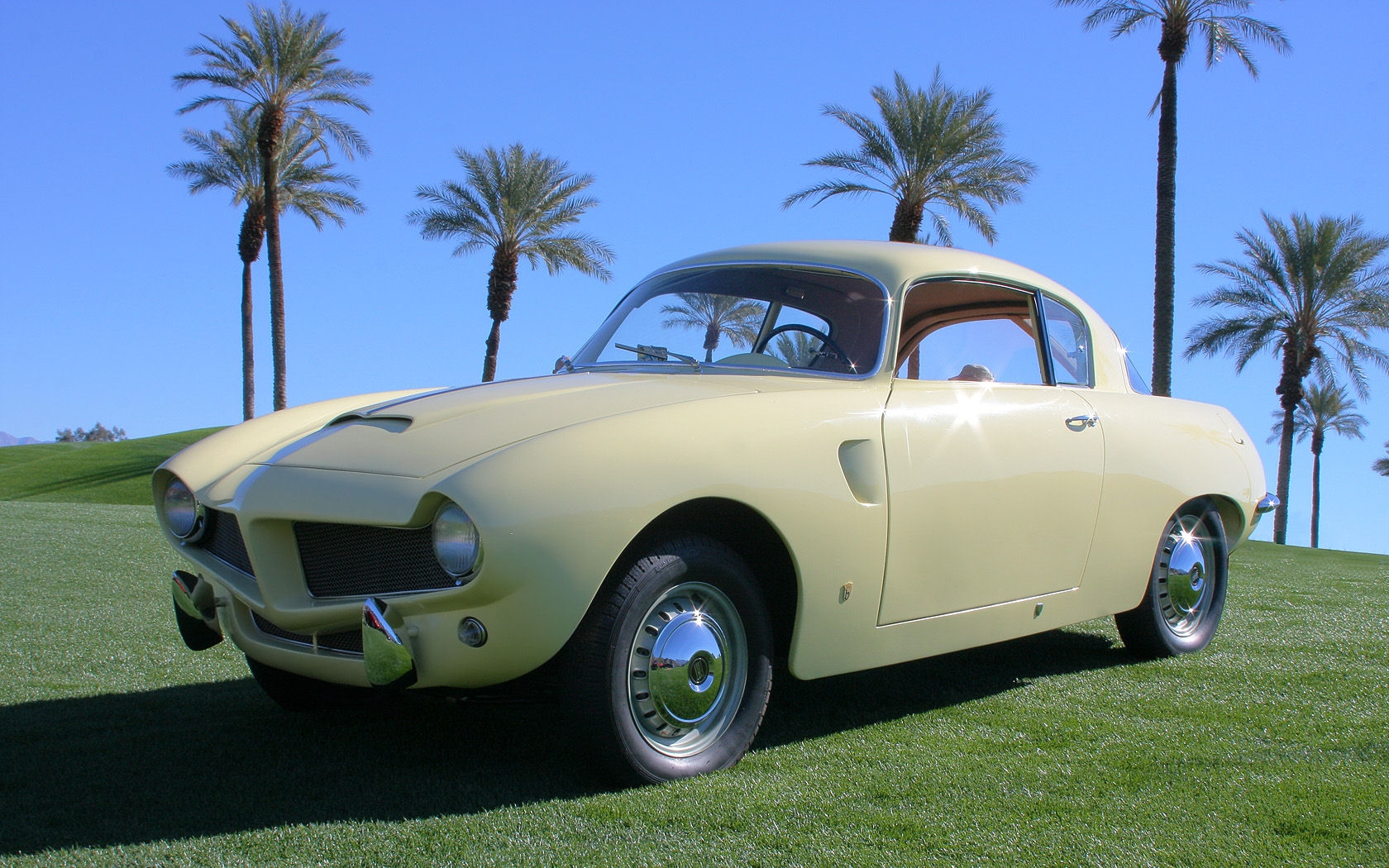
1953 Stanguellini Berlinetta.

- Mille Miglia 750cc class wins in 1938 and 1940
- Mille Miglia 1100cc class win in 1940
- Targa Florio 750cc class wins in 1938 & 1952
- 1957 12 Hours of Sebring class win with Herman Nehm, Carl Haas and Sandy MacArthur.
- 1959 European Formula Junior Championship
- 1959 Monaco Grand Prix Formula Junior
- 2004 Historic Grand Prix of Monaco class win

A Stanguellini won the Vanderbilt Cup in 1960 at the Roosevelt Raceway, New York. The Vanderbilt Cup was run as a Formula Junior race in 1960.

=== Road cars ===
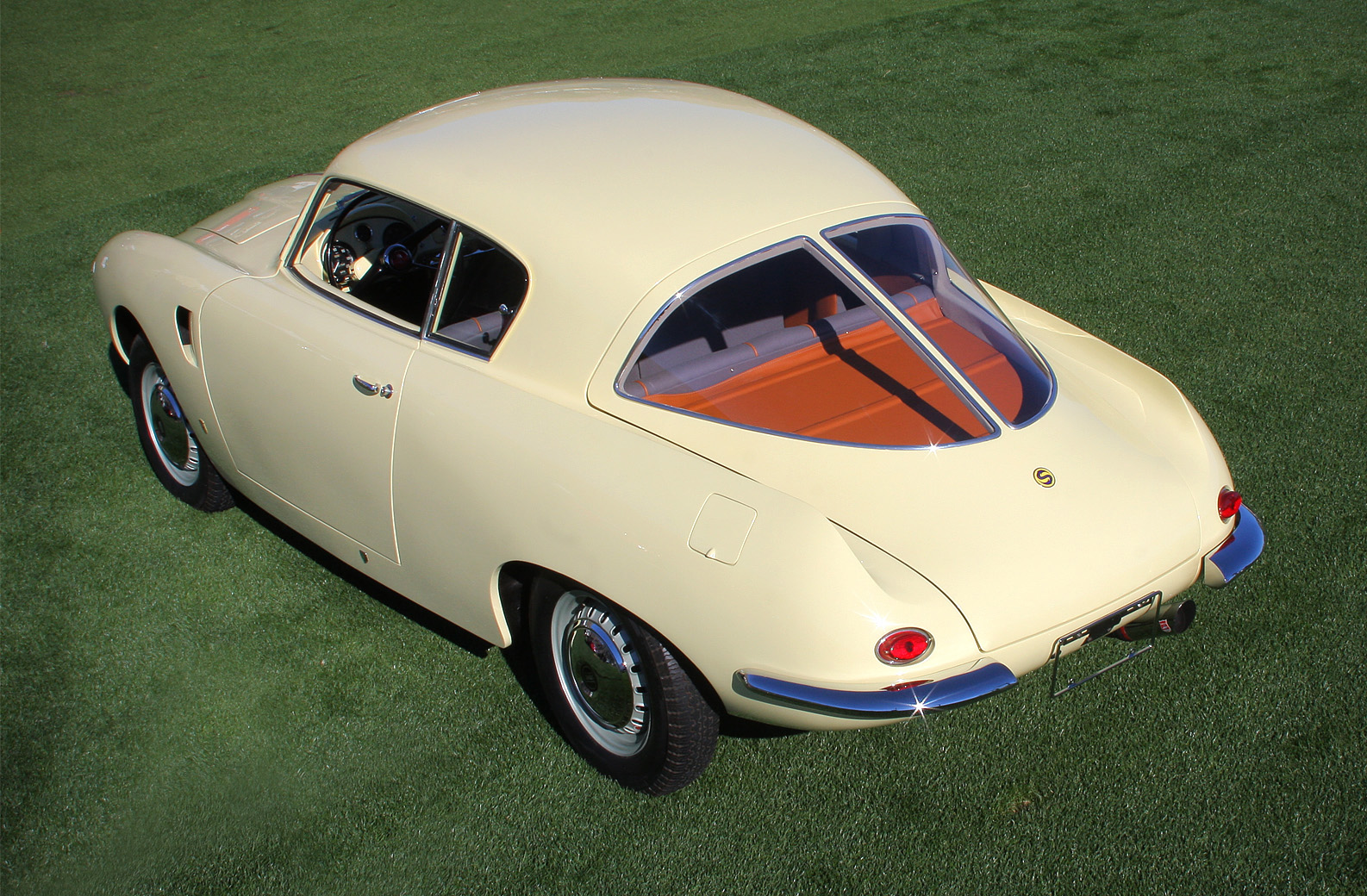
1953 Stanguellini Berlinetta, rear view

In 1947, a Bertone bodied four-seat berlinetta was offered, using familiar Fiat 1100 parts in a tubular chassis. This was also offered with a 1,500 cc engine. A Fiat 750-based two-seater was offered up the following year.

In the early 1970s Stanguellini built a series of chassis for Peter Kalikow's Momo Mirage GT coupe.

=== World speed records ===
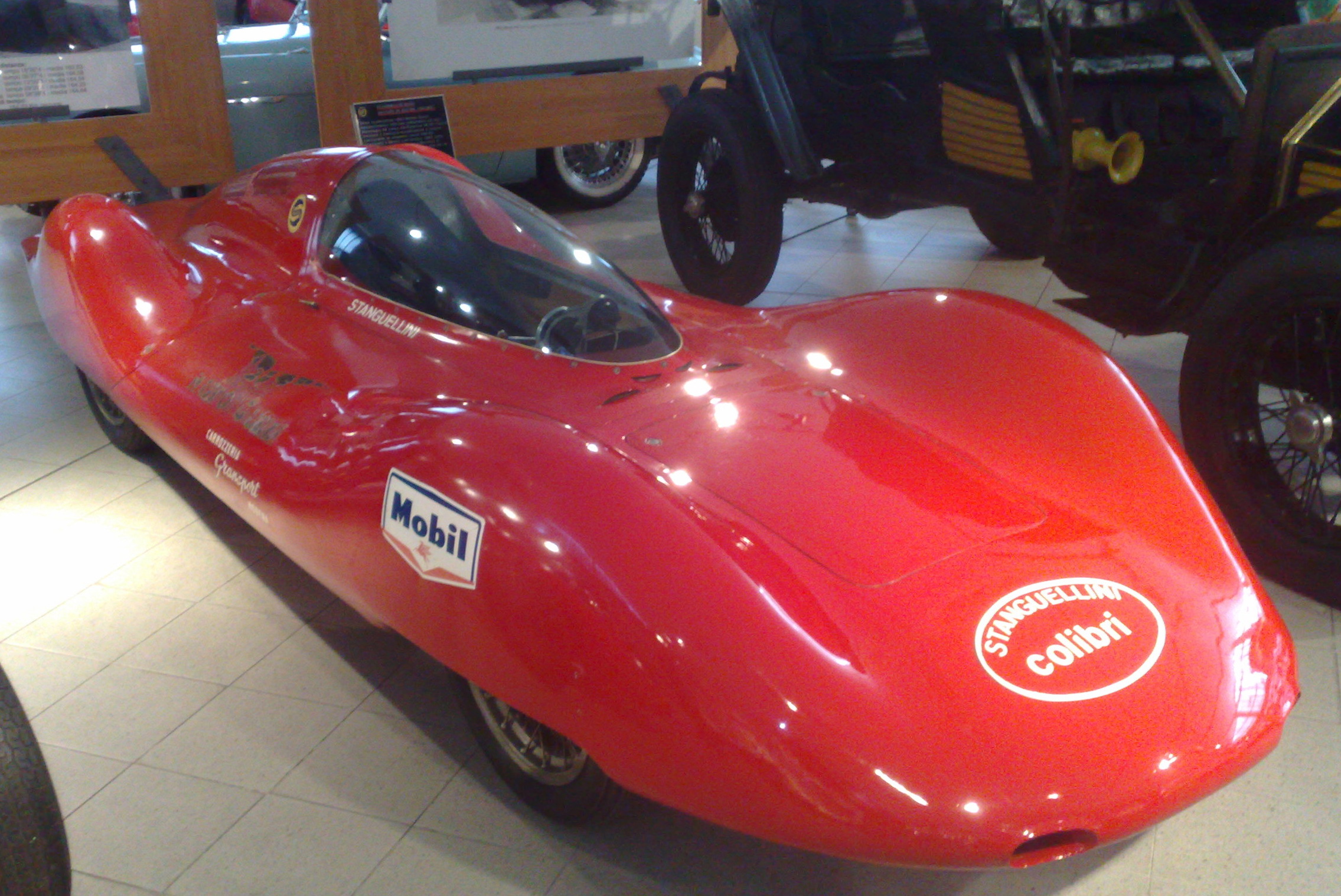
The Stanguellini Colibrì record car.

In 1963, Stanguellini completed a single-seat streamliner called the "Colibrì" (Italian for hummingbird), powered by a 250 cc Moto Guzzi motorcycle racing engine. This car set six international speed records at the Autodromo Nazionale Monza in 1963.

=== Formula Junior ===
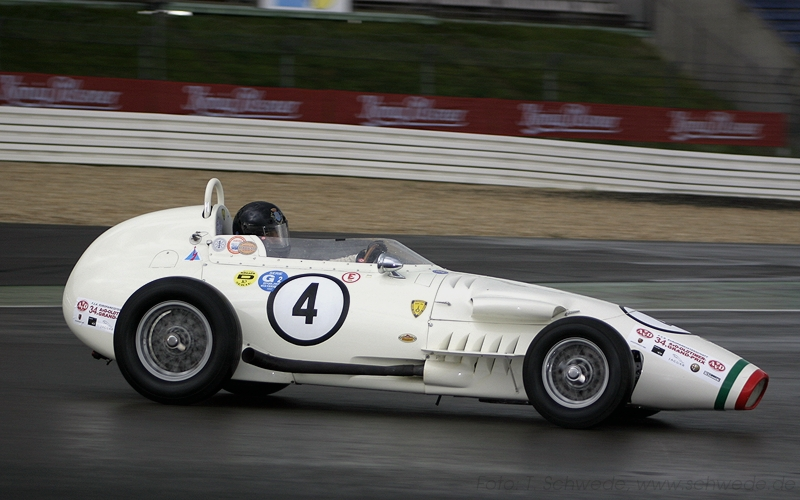
Stanguellini Formula Junior in Oldtimer Grand Prix 2006.

Stanguellini single-seaters, "scaled-down lookalikes of the famous Maserati 250F" powered by Fiat 1100 engines, were competitive in Formula Junior, a category under Formula One that existed between 1958 and 1963. Stanguellini won the first season of the Italian Formula Junior championship, and "famous drivers like Bandini and von Trips won their first races in Stanguellinis." Walt Hansgen won the FJ race at the inaugural United States Grand Prix meeting at Sebring, Florida, on December 12, 1959, driving a Stanguellini.

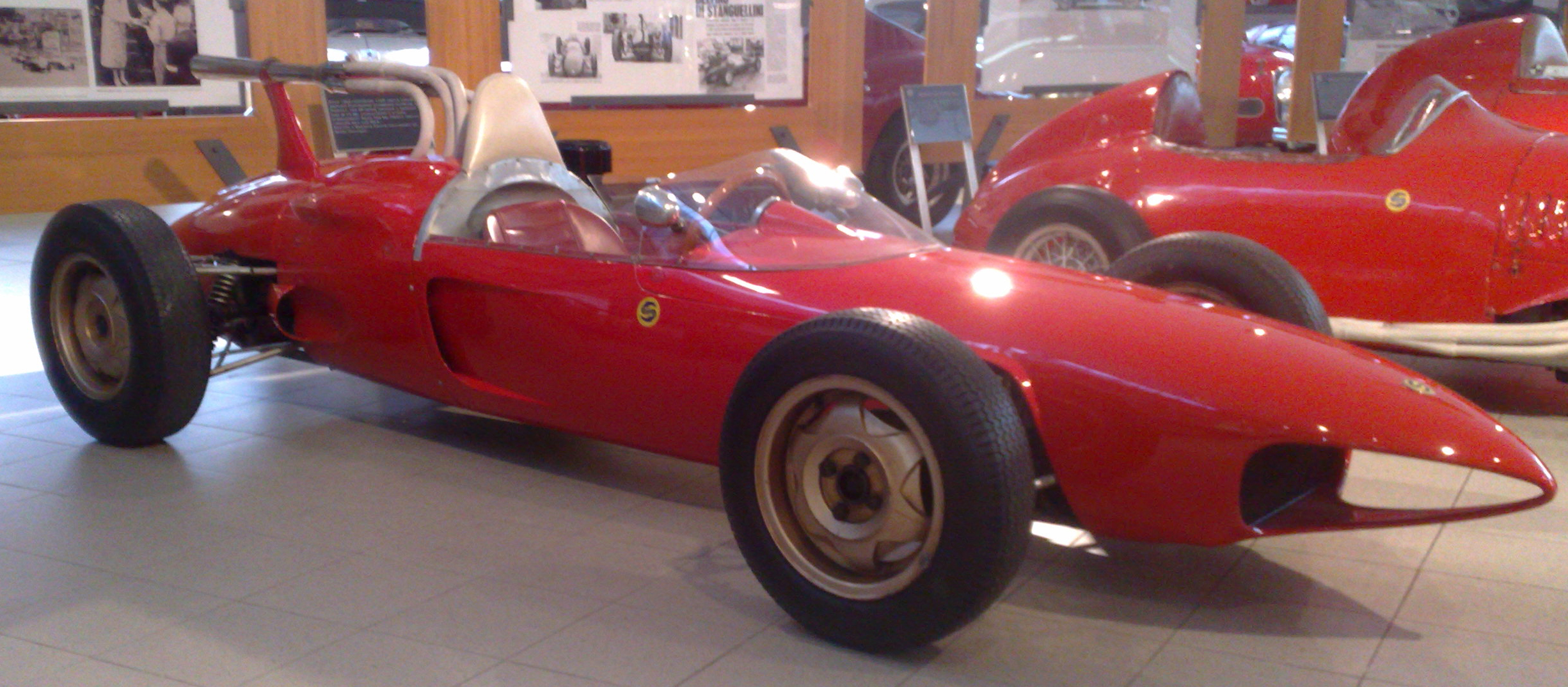
The mid-engined Stanguellini Delfino (1961–1962)

More than 100 Formula Juniors were built by Stanguellini, and they were very successful until 1960 and the arrival of British mid-engined racers like the Cooper and Lotus. As the days of the Fiat 1100-based, front-engined racers were over, Stanguellini did develop a mid-engined car called the Delfino for the 1962 season. The Fiat 1100 engine, although now tuned to 95 CV (70 kW) at 7500 rpm, was considered the car's weakest link. The Delfino debuted at Daytona 1962 in the hands of the Cunningham team's Walt Hansgen and started on pole. It retired with technical problems and the design was never fully competitive again. After 1966, the Stanguellini family concentrated their efforts on tuning equipment and subcontract design, while also running their Modena Fiat dealership.

=== See also ===
- Bandini Automobili
- Siata
- O.S.C.A.
- List of Italian companies
