= Ferrari 166 =

Ferrari used its 2 L (1995 cc/121 in^{3}) V12 engine in a number of models, all called 166 for the displacement of a single cylinder. Most early 166es were sports cars built for racing, though a later line of GT cars launched the company's street model line.

The following models used the 166 name:

- 1948 Ferrari 166 F2 — Formula Two racer
- 1948 Ferrari 166 S — racing barchetta and coupé
- 1948 Ferrari 166 SC — motorcycle-fender Spyder Corsa racing roadster
- 1948 Ferrari 166 MM — Mille Miglia racing barchetta and coupé
- 1949 Ferrari 166 Inter — coachbuilt street coupé and cabriolet
- 1949 Ferrari 166 FL — Formula Libre racer
- 1950 Ferrari 166 MM Berlinetta Le Mans — racing berlinetta
- 1953 Ferrari 166 MM/53 — 'Mille Miglia' racing barchetta and coupé, updated for the 1953 season
- 1953 Ferrari-Abarth 166 MM/53 — racing barchetta and coupé

The 1965 Dino 166 P and 1967 Dino 166 F2 — a Formula Two used a 1,6 L V6 engine.
