= The Folch Mineral Collection (Barcelona, Spain) =

Mineral collection accumulated by Joaquín Folch i Girona

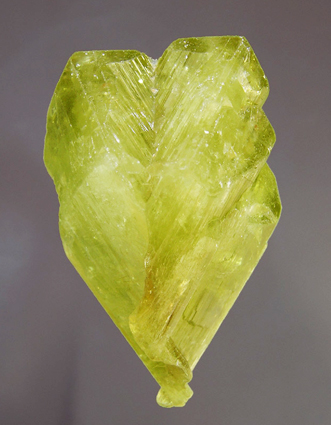
Chrysoberyl. Complete bigeminated twin, excellent color, luster and transparence. Tancredo, Santa Teresa, Espirito Santo, Brazil (1964). Specimen size: 3.2×2×1.8 cm.

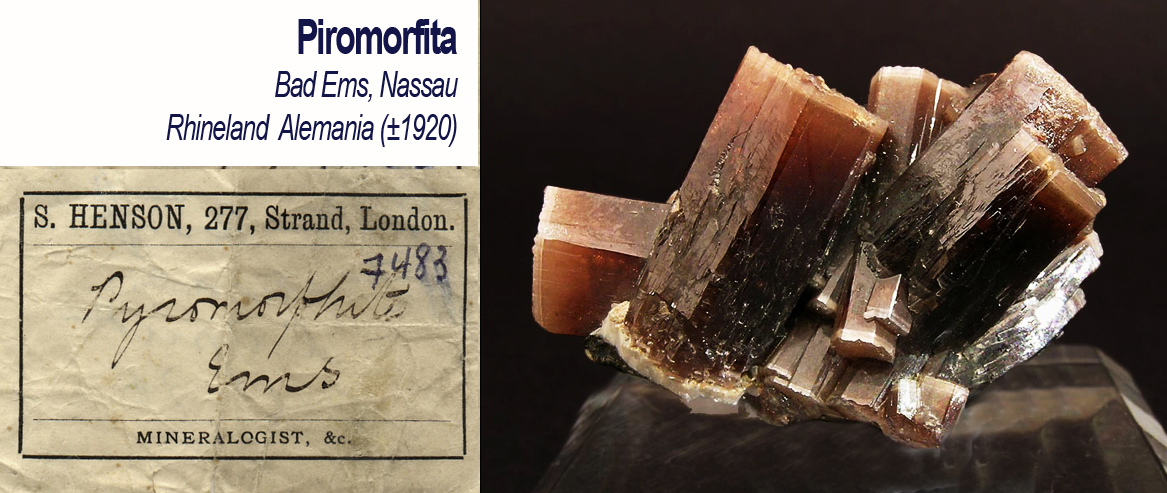
Group of prismatic Pyromorphite crystals with the usual color for specimens from this locality. Excellent brilliance, good size and very sharp crystals. With a very old label from S. Henson (London). Bad Ems, Nassau, Rhineland, Germany (±1920). Specimen size: 3.3×2.2×2.1 cm.

The Folch Collection was known during the period 1960-1980 as one of the best private mineral collections in the world. It was famous for its size (over 15,000 specimens), the quality of the pieces, the large number of classic specimens, which are now almost impossible to obtain, and the style of the collection, which is surprisingly 'modern'. Mr. Joaquín Folch i Girona collected during a period when the style of most mineral collectors in Europe consisted of gathering large specimens of rare minerals, and in which esthetics and perfection were not that important.

He actually tended to collect smaller specimens that were esthetic, and, where possible, damage free. On the death of Sr. Folch, in 1984, the collection passed to his son Alberto, and when he in turn died to his grandson Joaquín Folch who wisely decided to keep the collection exactly as his grandfather had it (including the display cases). So the collection was kept together and its great historical value has not been lost.

In 2005, the Folch family had the idea of updating the collection so as to include more modern material. Since 1984, nothing new had been added and a significant gap of the minerals found since then has developed.

== Bibliography References ==
Burchard, U. y Bode, R. (1980). Mineral Museums of Europe. Walnut Hill Publ. Lalling. 269 p.

== See also ==
- Expominer
