= 2008 Historic Grand Prix of Monaco =

← Previous race	Next race →
- Circuit de Monaco

Race details
- Date: 10–11 May 2008
- Official name: 6e Grand Prix de Monaco Historique
- Location: Circuit de Monaco
- Course: Street circuit
- Course length: 3.340 km (2.075 miles)

The 2008 Historic Grand Prix of Monaco was the sixth running of the Historic Grand Prix of Monaco, a motor racing event for heritage Grand Prix, Voiturettes, Formula One, Formula Two and Sports cars.

== Report ==
Entered for Race B was the Maserati 250F with which Stirling Moss had won the 1956 Monaco Grand Prix. The car was driven by Peter Heuberger but did not start the race. A battle between Duncan Dayton and Joaquín Folch-Rusiñol ended prematurely for Folch-Rusiñol, leaving second place to be decided by a fierce battle between Barrie Baxter and Tony Smith.

In Race C, Moss made his seventh and final competitive appearance at the event, at the wheel of a Frazer Nash. He wrote an entry in Motor Sport describing how the circuit had changed since his first visit, and expressed some disappointment at how lenient the track limits had become since then. In the race, fifth place was hotly contested between the powerful Ferrari 340 America of Michael Willms and the nimble Cooper T21 of Simon Diffey, the two cars being faster on different parts of the circuit but evenly matched on overall pace: their best laps were separated by just 0.028 s.

2008 represented the fiftieth anniversary of Formula Junior, a series that had been introduced in 1958 to encourage a new generation of racing drivers and whose annual Monaco race, supporting the Grand Prix, was one of the most prestigious events for young drivers. Formula Junior would also become the subject of the first historic motorsport series in 1975. Anniversary celebrations were held across the globe throughout 2008, and the event at Monaco (Race D) commemorated the first Formula Junior race at Monaco, held in 1959 and won by Michael May. A notable entrant in Race D was Tony Goodwin, whose long racing career includes an appearance in the 1964 Monaco Formula Three Race, where he had finished twelfth. In this event, he qualified on pole position and finished second. Jean Guittard made his first Historic Grand Prix of Monaco appearance in this race; in subsequent events, he would race under the pseudonym "Mister John of B".

Entered for Race F was a Ferrari 312 which had been raced by Chris Amon during the 1968 Formula One season. It was purchased and restored specifically for the event, which was thought to be its first competitive outing since 1969. Frank Sytner qualified fourth and stayed there most of the race, only to retire on the penultimate lap. Hamish Sommerville ran fifth but retired after seven laps.

Making his debut at the event was Bobby Verdon-Roe, driving a McLaren M26 in Race G. He crashed in the tunnel during practice, bringing his weekend to an end along with that of David Clark, who could not avoid the debris. Verdon-Roe would make up for this accident by dominating the 2010 event from pole position. Mauro Pane took the lead into the first corner but polesitter Paul Edwards kept him under intense pressure, eventually forcing a mistake that let Edwards through. Pane hit the barrier hard, but was able to continue to second place.

== Results ==
=== Summary ===
Série	Cars	Years	Pole position	Fastest lap		Race winner
A	Grand Prix	Pre-1947	(United Kingdom) Julian Bronson	(United Kingdom) Julian Bronson	2:04.225	(United Kingdom) Julian Bronson
B	Grand Prix - front engine	Pre-1961	(United States) Duncan Dayton	(United States) Duncan Dayton	1:56.658	(United States) Duncan Dayton
C	Sports cars and sports prototypes	Pre-1953	(United Kingdom) John Ure	(United Kingdom) John Ure	2:09.885	(United Kingdom) John Ure
D	Formula Junior		(United Kingdom) Tony Goodwin			(United Kingdom) John Monson
E	Grand Prix - rear engine	Pre-1966	(United Kingdom) Simon Hadfield	(United Kingdom) James Hanson	1:54.193	(United Kingdom) Simon Hadfield
F	Formula 1 - 3 litre	Pre-1975	(United States) Duncan Dayton	(Spain) Joaquín Folch-Rusiñol	1:35.658	(United States) Duncan Dayton
G	Formula 1 - 3 litre	1975-1978	(United States) Paul Edwards	(United States) Paul Edwards	1:34.019	(United States) Paul Edwards

=== Série A: Pre 1947 Grand Prix Cars ===
Pos.	No.	Driver	Car	Year	Laps	Time/retired	Grid
1	14	(United Kingdom) Julian Bronson	ERA R4D	1935	10	23:06.785	1
2	16	(United Kingdom) Matt Grist	Alfa Romeo P3	1934	10	+2.891	2
3	21	(Germany) Willi Balz	Maserati 6CM	1937	10	+28.864	
4	25	(United Kingdom) Richard Last	MG Parnell K3	1933	10	+32.293	
5	19	(United Kingdom) Tony Smith	Alfa Romeo P3	1934	10	+34.062	
6	66	(Italy) Tommaso Gelmini	Maserati 6CM/4CM	1936	10	+37.931	
7	17	(Italy) Umberto Rossi	Alfa Romeo P3	1934	10	+1:04.022	
8	6	(United Kingdom) Duncan Pittaway	Bugatti 35T	1925	10	+2:03.364	
9	28	(United States) Ed Davies	Alfa Romeo 8C Monza	1932	10	+2:18.049	
10	34	(Germany) Josef Otto Rettenmaier	Maserati 8C 3000	1932	10	+2:21.517	
11	7	(United Kingdom) Robert Newall	Bugatti 35	1926	10	+2:23.457	
12	9	(France) Ralf Emmerling	Riley Brooklands	1928	10	+2:24.245	
13	30	(United Kingdom) Philip Champion	Frazer Nash Supersports	1928	10	+2:26.482	
14	12	(France) Paul-Emile Bessade	Bugatti 51	1934	9	+1 lap	
15	5	(Netherlands) Marcel Sontrop	Bugatti 37	1927	9	+1 lap	
16	10	(United Kingdom) Julia de Baldanza	Bugatti 35B	1929	9	+1 lap	
17	2	(Switzerland) Jürg König	Bugatti 37A	1926	9	+1 lap	
18	3	(Monaco) Jean-Claude Miloe	Delage 1500	1927	9	+1 lap	
19	15	(United Kingdom) Geraint Lewis	Frazer Nash Monoplace	1936	7	+3 laps	
20	1	(United States) Ian Landy	Riley Brooklands 6	1933	5	+5 laps	
21	27	(Germany) Rainer Ott	ERA B	1936	3	+7 laps	
22	4	(Switzerland) Franz Messerli	Maserati 4CM	1932	3	+7 laps	
23	20	(United States) Warren Spieker	Alfa Romeo P3	1932	2	+8 laps	
24	11	(France) Jean-Jacques Strub	Bugatti 35/51	1926	1	+9 laps	
No lap	18	(United Kingdom) Peter Neumark	Alfa Romeo 8C Monza	1932			
No lap	23	(Republic of Ireland) Paddins Dowling	ERA B	1936			
DNS	24	(Switzerland) Georg Kaufmann	Maserati 4CL	1939			

=== Série B: Pre 1961 front engined Grand Prix cars ===
Pos.	No.	Driver	Car	Year	Laps	Time/retired	Grid
1	22	(United States) Duncan Dayton	Lotus 16	1959	10	19:46.060	1
2	19	(United Kingdom) Barrie Baxter	Tec-Mec 250F	1959	10	+31.338	3
3	23	(United Kingdom) Tony Smith	Ferrari Dino 246	1960	10	+31.542	
4	14	(United Kingdom) Nick Wigley	Connaught B	1954	10	+57.038	
5	3	(United Kingdom) Ian Nuthall	Alta F2	1952	10	+1:14.144	
6	17	(United Kingdom) Michael Steele	Connaught C	1956	10	+1:26.403	
7	7	(Belgium) Paul Grant	Cooper T23	1953	10	+1:38.100	
8	2	(United Kingdom) Steve Russell	Cooper T23	1953	9	+1 lap	
9	8	(United Kingdom) Barry Wood	Cooper T20	1952	9	+1 lap	
10	9	(United Kingdom) David Wenman	Connaught A	1952	9	+1 lap	
11	11	(Italy) Gigi Baulino	Maserati 250F "Interim"	1954	9	+1 lap	
12	5	(United Kingdom) David Clewley	Cooper-Alta	1953	9	+1 lap	
13	24	(United States) Tom Price	Maserati 250F	1956	9	+1 lap	
14	10	(Netherlands) Adrien van der Kroft	Connaught A	1952	9	+1 lap	
15	15	(France) Jean-Jacques Bally	Gordini T15	1947	9	+1 lap	
16	1	(United Kingdom) Julia de Baldanza	Maserati A6GCM	1951	9	+1 lap	
17	21	(United Kingdom) David Bennett	Maserati A6GCM	1953	9	+1 lap	
18	16	(France) Eric Leroy	Gordini T15	1947	8	+2 laps	
19	12	(Sweden) Lars-Goran Itskowitz	Lotus 12	1957	6	+4 laps	
20	20	(Spain) Joaquín Folch-Rusiñol	Lotus 16	1959	5	+5 laps	2
DNS	4	(Austria) Jean-Robert Grellet	Connaught A	1952			
DNS	6	(United Kingdom) James Willis	Pierce-MG F2	1951			
DNS	28	(Switzerland) Peter Heuberger	Maserati 250F	1956			

=== Série C: Pre 1953 Sports and Sports Prototype Cars ===
Pos.	No.	Driver	Car	Year	Laps	Time/retired	Grid
1	28	(United Kingdom) John Ure	Frazer Nash Le Mans Replica (Mk2)	1952	10	22:18.033	1
2	30	(United Kingdom) David Wenman	Jaguar C-Type	1952	10	+6.850	3
3	32	(United Kingdom) Nigel Webb	Jaguar C-Type	1952	10	+8.770	2
4	10	(United Kingdom) David Franklin	BMW 328	1938	10	+22.772	
5	96	(Germany) Michael Willms	Ferrari 340 America	1950	10	+57.015	
6	4	(United Kingdom) Simon Diffey	Cooper T21	1952	10	+58.735	
7	94	(Spain) Jose Fernandez	Ferrari 225 S	1952	10	+1:15.209	
8	34	(United Kingdom) Christopher Phillips	Allard J2X	1952	10	+1:17.426	
9	3	(Czech Republic) Miroslav Krejsa	Škoda 1101 Sport	1949	10	+1:42.638	
10	19	(United Kingdom) Barry Wood	RGS Atalanta	1952	10	+2:22.162	
11	18	(Germany) Albert Otten	BMW 328	1939	9	+1 lap	
12	22	(United Kingdom) Richard Wills	Ferrari 212 Inter	1952	9	+1 lap	
13	17	(United Kingdom) Richard Lake	Frazer Nash Le Mans Replica (Mk2)	1952	9	+1 lap	
14	1	(Spain) Carlos de Miguel	OSCA MT4	1949	9	+1 lap	
15	6	(United Kingdom) Patrick Blakeney-Edwards	BMW 328	1939	9	+1 lap	
16	11	(Spain) Juan Quintano	Ferrari 166 MM	1949	9	+1 lap	
17	2	(United Kingdom) Brandon Smith-Hilliard	MG K3	1933	9	+1 lap	
18	7	(United Kingdom) Stirling Moss	Frazer Nash Le Mans Replica (Mk1)	1950	9	+1 lap	
19	23	(United States) Stephen Dudley	Ferrari 166/195 S	1950	9	+1 lap	
20	31	(United Kingdom) Neil Hadfield	Jaguar C-Type	1952	9	+1 lap	
21	5	(United States) Thomas Mittler	OSCA MT4	1951	8	+2 laps	
22	27	(United Kingdom) Guy Loveridge	Connaught L2	1948	8	+2 laps	
23	14	(Switzerland) Erich Traber	Veritas RS	1948	8	+2 laps	
24	12	(United States) Warren Spieker	Frazer Nash High Speed	1948	6	+4 laps	
25	33	(Germany) Klaus-Peter Reichle	Allard J2X	1952	3	+7 laps	
26	21	(United Kingdom) Malcolm Verey	Allard J2	1950	1	+9 laps	
No lap	16	(United Kingdom) Colin Pearcy	Frazer Nash Le Mans Replica (Mk2)	1952			
DNS	15	(Germany) Paul Singer	Veritas RS	1948			
DNS	24	(United States) Tom Price	Aston Martin DB2	1949			
DNS	25	(Germany) Wolfgang Friedrichs	Aston Martin DB2	1952			
DNS	29	(United Kingdom) Eddie McGuire	Gordini T23S	1949			

=== Série D: Formula Junior ===
Pos.	No.	Driver	Car	Year	Laps	Time/retired	Grid
1	7	(United Kingdom) John Monson	BMC Mk1	1960	10	?	2
2	6	(United Kingdom) Tony Goodwin	Gemini Mk2	1959			1
3	12	(Italy) Simone Stanguellini	Stanguellini FJ	1960			
4	5	(United Kingdom) John Chisholm	Gemini Mk2	1959			
?	1	(United Kingdom) Duncan Rabagliatti	Alexis HF1	1959			
?	2	(United States) James Steerman	Dagrada-Lancia	1959			
?	3	(United Kingdom) Geoffrey O'Nion	Elva 100	1959			
?	4	(Germany) Heinz Stege	Elva 100	1959			
?	8	(United Kingdom) John Truslove	Elva-DKW 100	1960			
?	9	(United Kingdom) Steve Russell	Elva 100	1959			
?	10	(United Kingdom) Michael Ashley-Brown	Volpini FJ	1958			
?	11	(United States) Robert Woodward	P.L.W. FJ	1958			
?	14	(Monaco) Fabrice Notari	Stanguellini FJ	1959			
?	15	(France) Marc Coschieri	Stanguellini FJ	1959			
?	16	(France) Jean Guittard	Stanguellini FJ	1958			
?	17	(United Kingdom) William Grimshaw	Moorland Mk1	1959			
?	18	(Italy) Tazio Taraschi	Taraschi FJ	1960			
?	19	(Italy) Carlo Maria del Conte	Taraschi FJ	1960			
?	20	(Italy) Daniele Salodini	Taraschi FJ	1960			
?	21	(United Kingdom) Tony Steele	Taraschi FJ	1957			
?	22	(Italy) Tommaso Gelmini	Volpini FJ	1959			
?	23	(Monaco) Andrea Giuliani	Dagrada-Lancia	1959			
?	24	(Italy) Franco Beolchi	Apache Mk1	1959			
?	25	(United Kingdom) Crispian Besley	OSCA Tipo J	1960			
?	26	(Switzerland) Michael Gans	Stanguellini FJ	1959			3
?	27	(Italy) Maurizio Piantelli	Stanguellini FJ	1960			
?	28	(United Kingdom) Roger Earl	OSCA Tipo J	1959			
?	29	(Italy) Jason Wright	Stanguellini FJ	1960			
?	30	(United Kingdom) Francesco Liberatore	Stanguellini FJ	1959			
?	31	(United Kingdom) Peter Mullen	OSCA Tipo J	1960			
?	32	(United Kingdom) Jarrah Venables	EFAC Stanguellini FJ	1959			
?	33	(United States) Tupper Robinson	Bandini FJ	1958/1959			
?	34	(United Kingdom) Ian Robinson	Autosud FJ	1959			
?	46	(Italy) Stefano Rosina	Moretti-Branca FJ	1959			
?	126	(Italy) Massimo Comelli	OSCA Tipo J	1960			
?	140	(Italy) Bruno Ferrari	Stanguellini FJ	1960			

=== Série E: Pre 1966 Rear Engined Grand Prix Cars ===
Pos.	No.	Driver	Car	Year	Laps	Time/retired	Grid
1	9	(United Kingdom) Simon Hadfield	Lotus 21	1961	10	19:19.463	1
2	15	(United Kingdom) James Hanson	Scirocco F1	1963	10	+7.993	2
3	23	(Monaco) Marcus Mussa	Lotus 24	1962	10	+29.438	
4	37	(United Kingdom) Alan Baillie	Cooper T36	1964	10	+35.936	3
5	21	(United Kingdom) Joe Twyman	Cooper T45	1957	10	+52.504	
6	7	(United Kingdom) Mark Clubb	Cooper T45	1958	10	+52.802	
7	10	(United Kingdom) Dan Collins	Lotus 21	1961	10	+1:07.812	
8	8	(United Kingdom) John Elliott	Lotus 18	1961	10	+1:35.802	
9	14	(United Kingdom) Allan Miles	Cooper T41	1957	10	+1:49.490	
10	3	(United Kingdom) Andrew Wareing	BRM P261	1964	10	+2:00.446	
11	32	(United Kingdom) Nick Wigley	Cooper T51	1959	9	+1 lap	
12	27	(Italy) Marco Cajani	De Tomaso F1	1961	9	+1 lap	
13	17	(Argentina) Jorge Ferioli	Lola Mk4	1962	9	+1 lap	
14	12	(United Kingdom) Rupert Wood	Cooper T43	1957	9	+1 lap	
15	33	(United Kingdom) Rodger Newman	Brabham BT14	1965	9	+1 lap	
16	5	(United Kingdom) Christopher Mann	Lotus 18	1960	9	+1 lap	
17	34	(Belgium) André Wanty	Lotus 18/21	1961	9	+1 lap	
18	26	(United Kingdom) Brian Anthony Ashby	Emeryson F1	1961	9	+1 lap	
19	31	(Germany) Rudolf Ernst	Lotus 18	1960	9	+1 lap	
20	25	(Germany) Richard Weiland	Lotus 24	1962	8	+2 laps	
21	44	(Italy) Marco Masini	Cooper T51	1959	8	+2 laps	
22	11	(Switzerland) Stephane Gutzwiller	Cooper T51	1960	8	+2 laps	
23	20	(United Kingdom) Marshall Bailey	JBW Type 1	1959	7	+3 laps	
24	24	(United Kingdom) Frank Sytner	Lotus 24	1962	4	+6 laps	
25	29	(United States) Kurt DelBene	BRP-BRM	1964	1	+9 laps	
26	36	(Belgium) Stanislas de Sadeleer	Cooper T51	1959	1	+9 laps	
DNS	22	(United States) Douglas Mockett	Cooper T53	1961			

=== Série F: Pre 1975 Formula 1 - 3 litre ===
Pos.	No.	Driver	Car	Year	Laps	Time/retired	Grid
1	8	(United States) Duncan Dayton	Brabham BT33	1970	15	26:23.840	1
2	3	(Spain) Joaquín Folch-Rusiñol	McLaren M23	1974	15	+0.243	2
3	10	(Italy) Manfredo Rossi di Montelera	Brabham BT42/44	1973	15	+17.276	3
4	30	(United Kingdom) Ron Maydon	Amon AF101	1974	15	+1:14.349	
5	6	(Italy) Andrea Burani	McLaren M23	1974	15	+1:24.471	
6	4	(United States) Jeffrey Lewis	Tyrrell 007	1974	14	+1 lap	
7	20	(Monaco) Yves Saguato	Matra MS120C	1971	14	+1 lap	
8	15	(Italy) Roberto Crippa	McLaren M19A	1971	14	+1 lap	
9	36	(United States) Richard Carlino	Surtees TS9B	1971	14	+1 lap	
10	12	(United Kingdom) John Monson	Surtees TS9B	1971	14	+1 lap	
11	33	(United States) Bradley Hoyt	Ferrari 312	1969	14	+1 lap	
12	34	(United Kingdom) Robert Lamplough	BRM P133	1967	14	+1 lap	
13	32	(France) Jean-François Decaux	Ferrari 312	1967	14	+1 lap	
14	21	(France) Christophe Caternet	Matra MS120B	1971	14	+1 lap	
15	24	(United Kingdom) Frank Sytner	Hesketh 308	1974	13	+2 laps	4
16	23	(Austria) Gunter Alth	March 701	1970	13	+2 laps	
17	25	(France) Jean-Louis Duret	Lotus 76	1974	10	+5 laps	
18	26	(Canada) Hamish Sommerville	Brabham BT37	1972	7	+8 laps	
19	9	(United States) Lee Brahin	Hesketh 308	1974	6	+9 laps	
20	31	(United Kingdom) James Wood	Cooper T86C	1968	5	+10 laps	
21	7	(United Kingdom) Paul Knapfield	Brabham BT42	1973	1	+14 laps	
22	27	(United Kingdom) Mike Wrigley	March 711	1971	1	+14 laps	
DNS	11	(France) Michel Ghio	Surtees TS9B	1971			

=== Série G: Formula 1 - 3 litre from 1975 to 1978 ===
Pos.	No.	Driver	Car	Year	Laps	Time/retired	Grid
1	28	(United States) Paul Edwards	Penske PC3	1975	15	24:31.285	1
2	33	(Italy) Mauro Pane	Tyrrell P34	1977	15	+2.105	2
3	14	(Belgium) Jean-Michel Martin	Ensign N177	1977	15	+18.847	4
4	15	(Monaco) Jean-Pierre Richelmi	Ensign N175	1975	15	+19.382	3
5	35	(United Kingdom) Peter Dunn	March 761	1976	15	+39.388	6
6	23	(Japan) Katsuaki Kubota	Williams FW06	1978	15	+43.620	7
7	29	(Belgium) Christophe d'Ansembourg	McLaren M26	1976	15	+54.588	
8	17	(United Kingdom) Paul Knapfield	Penske PC3	1975	15	+1:03.021	
9	9	(United States) Michael Fitzgerald	March 761B	1976	15	+1:04.384	
10	26	(United Kingdom) Peter Williams	March 761	1976	15	+1:04.612	
11	22	(United Kingdom) Steve Hartley	Williams FW05	1975	15	+1:23.541	
12	1	(United States) Chris MacAllister	Ferrari 312T2	1976	15	+1:23.798	
13	16	(United States) Nicholas Colyvas	Shadow DN5	1975	15	+1:28.734	
14	27	(Portugal) Rodrigo Gallego	March 761	1976	15	+1:41.425	
15	3	(Switzerland) Andrea Bahlsen	Tyrrell 008	1978	14	+1 lap	
16	6	(Netherlands) Nico Bindels	Lotus 77	1976	14	+1 lap	
17	20	(United States) Richard Carlino	Hesketh 308C	1975	14	+1 lap	
18	25	(United Kingdom) Frank Lyons	McLaren M26	1976	13	+2 laps	
19	18	(United Kingdom) Mark Dwyer	Surtees TS19	1977	13	+2 laps	
20	12	(Italy) Walter Burani	Ferrari 312T	1975	12	+3 laps	
21	4	(United States) Don Edwards	Tyrrell 008	1978	11	+4 laps	
22	19	(United Kingdom) Anthony Hancock	Surtees TS19	1976	10	+5 laps	
23	30	(United States) David Olson	Parnelli VPJ4	1974	8	+7 laps	
24	5	(United States) Christopher Locke	Lotus 77	1976	5	+10 laps	
25	24	(United Kingdom) Michael Lyons	Hesketh 308E	1977	4	+11 laps	
26	34	(United Kingdom) Martin Stretton	Tyrrell P34	1977	2	+13 laps	5
27	21	(United Kingdom) Andrew Smith	Hesketh 308E	1977	2	+13 laps	
No lap	7	(Switzerland) Hubertus Bahlsen	Brabham BT45B	1976			
DNS	2	(Italy) Giancarlo Casoli	Ferrari 312T	1975			
DNS	8	(United Kingdom) Bobby Verdon-Roe	McLaren M26	1977			
DNS	10	(United Kingdom) David Clark	March 761	1976			
DNS	31	(Germany) Peter Wuensch	Wolf WR1	1977			
