= 2010 Historic Grand Prix of Monaco =

← Previous race	Next race →
- Circuit de Monaco

Race details
- Date: 1–2 May 2010
- Official name: 7e Grand Prix de Monaco Historique
- Location: Circuit de Monaco
- Course: Street circuit
- Course length: 3.340 km (2.075 miles)

The 2010 Historic Grand Prix of Monaco was the seventh running of the Historic Grand Prix of Monaco, a motor racing event for heritage Grand Prix, Voiturettes, Formula One, Formula Two and Sports cars.

== Report ==
Entered for Race B was a CTA-Arsenal, believed to be the only remaining example in existence. It had been restored specifically for the event. There were issues with the car's legality, perhaps due to uncertainty whether it belonged in Race A or Race B. Driver Josef Otto Rettenmaier retired the car after qualifying for Race B as he did not trust the brakes.

In Race D, Richard Hein and Tommaso Gelmini qualified first and third respectively, but neither made the start due to mechanical issues.

In Race E, Gary Pearson drove the Cooper T60 with which Bruce McLaren had won the 1962 Monaco Grand Prix. The car had been restored to running order for this event and gave out smoke when it ran. Pearson ran third in the race, but was mistakenly black-flagged when oil was discovered on the circuit. It was later discovered that the Lotus 24 of Frank Sytner had been the car leaking oil.

Race F featured ex-F1 drivers Nanni Galli in a Tecno PA123 which he had raced during 1972, and Richard Attwood, who snapped a driveshaft on the formation lap.

In Race G, Stéphane Richelmi held second place until suffering a loss of gears on lap 9.

Emanuele Pirro won Race H in the same Martini Mk34 chassis he had raced at Monaco in 1981. Valerio Leone ran a distant second but was taken out by a lapped car late in the race, bringing out a safety car that compressed the running order.

== Results ==
=== Summary ===
Série	Cars	Years	Pole position	Fastest lap		Race winner
A	Grand Prix	Pre-1947		(United Kingdom) Julian Bronson	2:04.148	(United Kingdom) Julian Bronson
B	Grand Prix - front engine	1947-1960		(United States) Duncan Dayton	1:56.573	(United States) Duncan Dayton
C	Sports cars	Pre-1953		(Brazil) Carlos Monteverde	2:07.653	(Brazil) Carlos Monteverde
D	Formula 3 – 1000 cc	1964-1970	(Monaco) Richard Hein	(France) François Derossi	1:57.181	(Switzerland) Christian Traber
E	Grand Prix - rear engine	1954-1965	(United States) James King	(United States) James King	1:54.588	(United States) James King
F	Formula 1	1966-1974	(United Kingdom) Frank Sytner	(United States) Duncan Dayton	1:34.966	(United States) Duncan Dayton
G	Formula 1	1975-1978	(United Kingdom) Bobby Verdon-Roe	(United Kingdom) Bobby Verdon-Roe	1:32.989	(United Kingdom) Bobby Verdon-Roe
H	Formula 3	1971-1973 (1600cc); 1974-1984 (2000cc)	(Italy) Emanuele Pirro	(Italy) Emanuele Pirro	1:42.376	(Italy) Emanuele Pirro

=== Série A: Pre 1947 Grand Prix Cars ===
Pos.	No.	Driver	Car	Year	Laps	Time/retired	Grid
1	50	(United Kingdom) Julian Bronson	ERA R4D	1935	10	21:09.375	
2	56	(United States) Ian Landy	ERA B	1936	10	+13.778	
3	58	(Switzerland) Michael Gans	ERA B	1935	10	+27.373	
4	44	(Germany) Willi Balz	Maserati 6CM	1937	10	+42.181	
5	54	(Germany) Rainer Ott	ERA B	1936	10	+45.864	
6	24	(United Kingdom) Tony Smith	Alfa Romeo P3	1934	10	+1:37.781	
7	20	(Germany) Josef Otto Rettenmaier	Maserati V8RI	1936	10	+1:43.711	
8	52	(Republic of Ireland) Paddins Dowling	ERA B	1936	10	+1:44.069	
9	16	(United States) Ed Davies	Alfa Romeo 8C Monza	1932	10	+2:12.698	
10	22	(Italy) Umberto Rossi	Alfa Romeo P3	1934	10	+2:16.747	
11	36	(United Kingdom) Duncan Pittaway	Bugatti 35	1925	9	+1 lap	
12	60	(Austria) Jean-Robert Grellet	ERA A	1935	9	+1 lap	
13	30	(United Kingdom) Philip Champion	Frazer Nash Supersports	1928	9	+1 lap	
14	32	(France) Ralf Emmerling	Riley Brooklands	1928	9	+1 lap	
15	46	(Germany) Stephan Rettenmaier	Maserati 6CM	1937	9	+1 lap	
16	12	(France) Thierry Chanoine	Riley Dobbs	1935	9	+1 lap	
17	6	(Switzerland) Jürg König	Bugatti 37A	1926	9	+1 lap	
18	4	(United Kingdom) Brandon Smith-Hilliard	MG K3	1933	9	+1 lap	
19	48	(Switzerland) Roland Portmann	Maserati 4CL	1939	8	+2 laps	
20	10	(Austria) Winfried Kallinger	Squire 1500 S/C	1935	8	+2 laps	
21	26	(France) Paul-Emile Bessade	Bugatti 51	1934	8	+2 laps	
22	38	(Netherlands) Marcel Sontrop	Bugatti 37	1927	8	+2 laps	
23	28	(United Kingdom) Julia de Baldanza	Bugatti 35B	1929	8	+2 laps	
24	34	(United Kingdom) Timothy Dutton	Bugatti 35	1925	4	+6 laps	
DNS	2	(United Kingdom) Richard Last	MG Parnell K3	1933			
DNS	18	(United Kingdom) Peter Neumark	Alfa Romeo 8C Monza	1932			

=== Série B: Front Engine Grand Prix Cars (1947–1960) ===
Pos.	No.	Driver	Car	Year	Laps	Time/retired	Grid
1	42	(United States) Duncan Dayton	Lotus 16	1959	10	19:46.944	3
2	8	(United Kingdom) Gary Pearson	BRM P25	1958	10	+9.366	
3	36	(United Kingdom) Tony Smith	Ferrari Dino 246	1960	10	+15.244	1/2
4	34	(Netherlands) Jos Koster	Maserati 250F "Piccolo"	1957	10	+1:05.429	
5	26	(United Kingdom) Ian Nuthall	Alta F2	1952	10	+1:06.095	
6	22	(United Kingdom) Tony Wood	Cooper T23 (Mk2)	1953	10	+1:38.770	
7	14	(France) Jean-Jacques Bally	Gordini T11/15	1948	10	+2:09.440	
8	18	(Belgium) Paul Grant	Cooper T23 (Mk2)	1953	9	+1 lap	
9	4	(United Kingdom) Nick Eden	Cooper T20 (Mk1)	1953	9	+1 lap	
10	12	(United Kingdom) Wil Arif	Connaught A	1953	9	+1 lap	
11	32	(United States) Tom Price	Maserati 250F "Offset"	1956	9	+1 lap	
12	6	(United Kingdom) Barry Wood	Cooper T20 (Mk1)	1952	9	+1 lap	
13	24	(Netherlands) Adrien van der Kroft	HWM-Alta F2/52	1952	8	+2 laps	
14	28	(Belgium) Christian Dumolin	Maserati A6GCS	1947	8	+2 laps	
15	16	(France) Eric Leroy	Gordini T11/15	1946	8	+2 laps	
16	30	(Italy) Gigi Baulino	Maserati 250F "Interim"	1954	5	+5 laps	
17	40	(Spain) Joaquín Folch-Rusiñol	Lotus 16	1959	4	+6 laps	1/2
DNS	2	(Germany) Josef Otto Rettenmaier	CTA-Arsenal	1947			

=== Série C: Pre 1953 Sport Cars ===
Pos.	No.	Driver	Car	Year	Laps	Time/retired	Grid
1	52	(Brazil) Carlos Monteverde	Jaguar C-Type	1952	10	21:46.894	
2	24	(United Kingdom) Patrick Blakeney-Edwards	Frazer Nash Le Mans Replica (Mk2)	1952	10	+6.316	
3	28	(United Kingdom) John Ure	Frazer Nash Le Mans Replica (Mk2)	1952	10	+19.185	
4	36	(United Kingdom) Nigel Webb	Jaguar C-Type	1952	10	+37.663	
5	56	(United Kingdom) Eddie McGuire	Gordini T23S	1949	10	+39.826	
6	50	(United Kingdom) Rick Hall	Jaguar C-Type	1952	10	+1:09.254	
7	40	(United Kingdom) David Wenman	Jaguar C-Type	1952	10	+1:17.098	
8	16	(Netherlands) Jos Koster	Maserati A6GCS	1952	10	+1:17.977	
9	10	(Austria) Dieter Quester	BMW 328	1937	10	+1:57.147	
10	20	(Germany) Michael Willms	Ferrari 340 America	1952	9	+1 lap	
11	6	(United States) Thomas Mittler	OSCA MT4	1952	9	+1 lap	
12	26	(United Kingdom) Richard Lake	Frazer Nash Le Mans Replica (Mk2)	1952	9	+1 lap	
13	34	(United Kingdom) Mark Midgley	Aston Martin DB3	1952	9	+1 lap	
14	4	(Spain) Carlos de Miguel	OSCA MT4	1948	9	+1 lap	
15	2	(United Kingdom) Michael Dee	Aston Martin Speed	1936	9	+1 lap	
16	68	(Spain) Jose Fernandez	Talbot-Lago T26GS	1951	9	+1 lap	
17	18	(Spain) Juan Quintano	Ferrari 166 MM	1950	9	+1 lap	
18	76	(United Kingdom) Martin Melling	Aston Martin DB3	1952	9	+1 lap	
19	22	(United Kingdom) Stephen Curtis	Frazer Nash Le Mans Replica (Mk1)	1950	9	+1 lap	
20	30	(United States) Tom Price	Aston Martin DB2	1949	9	+1 lap	
21	44	(United States) Alan Patterson	Allard J2X	1952	9	+1 lap	
22	48	(Germany) Klaus Reichle	Allard J2X	1952	9	+1 lap	
23	8	(France) Antoine Blasco	OSCA MT4	1952	8	+2 laps	
24	66	(Spain) Miguel Arias	Nash-Healey Le Mans X6	1952	8	+2 laps	
25	12	(Switzerland) Philippe Burckhardt	BMW 328	1939	8	+2 laps	
26	32	(Germany) Wolfgang Friedrichs	Aston Martin DB3	1952	7	+3 laps	
27	14	(Germany) Lutz Rathenow	Veritas RS2000	1948	2	+8 laps	
28	38	(United Kingdom) Chris Buncombe	Jaguar C-Type	1952	2	+8 laps	
29	54	(France) Flavien Marcais	Jaguar C-Type	1952	1	+9 laps	
30	42	(Germany) Albert Otten	Allard J2	1950	1	+9 laps	

=== Série D: Formula 3 Cars 1000cc (1964–1970) ===
Pos.	No.	Driver	Car	Year	Laps	Time/retired	Grid
1	21	(Switzerland) Christian Traber	Brabham BT21	1967	9	18:09.823	
2	22	(France) François Derossi	Chevron B17	1970	9	+0.368	
3	6	(United Kingdom) Paul McMorran	Crosslé 17F	1970	9	+4.397	
4	20	(France) Michel Gendre	Brabham BT21	1967	9	+20.280	
5	17	(United Kingdom) Richard Eyre	Chevron B15	1969	9	+28.592	
6	4	(Germany) Hermann Unold	Tecno F3	1970	9	+37.575	
7	9	(France) Michel Renavand	Tecno F3	1969	9	+45.342	
8	61	(United Kingdom) Chris Holland	Brabham BT21	1967	9	+46.415	
9	46	(France) René Ligonnet	Chevron B15	1969	9	+1:04.025	
10	49	(Italy) Piero Lottini	March 703	1970	9	+1:16.511	
11	40	(France) Philippe Bonny	Tecno F3	1969	9	+1:16.755	
12	16	(United Kingdom) Stephen Wilkinson	Brabham BT21B	1968	9	+1:32.373	
13	62	(United Kingdom) Geoffrey O'Nion	Tecno F3	1969	9	+1:37.358	
14	87	(United Kingdom) Leif Bosson	Brabham BT28	1969	9	+1:37.797	
15	90	(Switzerland) Angelo Delea	Brabham BT16	1965	9	+1:41.083	
16	5	(United Kingdom) Gareth Williams	Lotus 41	1966	8	+1 lap	
17	1	(Germany) Robert Retzlaff	Brabham BT15	1965	8	+1 lap	
18	7	(Belgium) Mauro Poponcini	Cooper T76	1965	8	+1 lap	
19	8	(France) "Mister John of B"	Tecno F3	1968	8	+1 lap	
20	65	(United Kingdom) Nigel Miller	Brabham BT21	1967	8	+1 lap	
21	19	(Sweden) Ferdinand Gustafson	Brabham BT18	1966	6	+3 laps	
22	82	(Monaco) Alfredo Maisto	Tecno F3	1969	3	+6 laps	
23	10	(United Kingdom) Chris Drake	Spider F3	1965	2	+7 laps	
No lap	2	(Italy) Francesco Zadotti	Bianchini F3	1967			
No lap	3	(Germany) Klaus Bergs	Brabham BT28	1969			
No lap	11	(United Kingdom) Ian Bankhurst	Alexis Mk8	1965			
No lap	12	(Switzerland) Juerg Tobler	Chevron B17	1970			
No lap	14	(Monaco) Richard Hein	Brabham BT28	1969			1
No lap	15	(Monaco) Marc Faggionato	Lotus 31	1964			
No lap	18	(Italy) Maurizio Piantelli	De Sanctis F3	1967			
No lap	42	(Italy) Tommaso Gelmini	Matra MS5	1966			3
No lap	67	(United States) Tupper Robinson	Mallock Mk4	1964			

=== Série E: Rear Engine Grand Prix Cars (1954–1965) ===
Pos.	No.	Driver	Car	Year	Laps	Time/retired	Grid
1	4	(United States) James King	Brabham BT7	1963	10	21:02.718	1
2	6	(United Kingdom) Andy Middlehurst	Lotus 25/33	1965	10	+20.162	
3	25	(United Kingdom) Joe Twyman	Cooper T45	1957	10	+47.086	
4	32	(United Kingdom) Nick Wigley	Cooper T51	1959	9	+1 lap	
5	27	(United Kingdom) James Willis	Cooper T45	1958	9	+1 lap	
6	21	(United States) Douglas Mockett	Cooper T53	1961	9	+1 lap	
7	20	(United Kingdom) Marshall Bailey	JBW Type 1	1959	9	+1 lap	
8	40	(United Kingdom) Steve Russell	Cooper T51	1959	9	+1 lap	
9	17	(Argentina) Jorge Ferioli	Lola Mk4	1962	9	+1 lap	
10	15	(United States) Kurt DelBene	BRP-BRM	1964	9	+1 lap	
11	18	(Netherlands) Armand Adriaans	Scirocco-BRM	1962	9	+1 lap	
12	22	(United Kingdom) David Coplowe	Lotus 24	1962	9	+1 lap	
13	35	(Belgium) Stanislas de Sadeleer	Cooper T51	1959	9	+1 lap	
14	8	(United Kingdom) John Elliott	Lotus 18	1960	9	+1 lap	
15	31	(Monaco) Andrea Giuliani	Cooper T51	1960	9	+1 lap	
16	2	(United Kingdom) Nigel Williams	Lotus 24	1962	9	+1 lap	
17	29	(United Kingdom) John Bussey	Cooper T43	1957	9	+1 lap	
18	3	(United Kingdom) Rodger Newman	Brabham BT14	1965	9	+1 lap	
19	11	(United Kingdom) John Clark	Cooper T51	1959	8	+2 laps	
20	10	(United Kingdom) Brian Anthony Ashby	Emeryson F1	1961	8	+2 laps	
21	34	(Germany) Rudolf Ernst	Lotus 18	1961	8	+2 laps	
22	5	(United Kingdom) David Fitzsimons	BRM P57	1961	8	+2 laps	
23	44	(Italy) Marco Masini	Cooper T51	1959	8	+2 laps	
24	19	(United Kingdom) Sidney Hoole	Cooper T66	1963	7	+3 laps	
25	23	(United Kingdom) Alan Baillie	Cooper T71/73	1964	7	+3 laps	
26	28	(United States) Michael Fitzgerald	Lola Mk4	1962	7	+3 laps	
27	14	(United Kingdom) Gary Pearson	Cooper T60	1962	6	+4 laps	
28	12	(New Zealand) Roger Wills	Cooper T51	1959	3	+7 laps	
29	9	(Monaco) William Brian Churchill	LDS F1	1961	3	+7 laps	
30	24	(United Kingdom) Frank Sytner	Lotus 24	1962	2	+8 laps	
31	7	(United Kingdom) Dan Collins	Lotus 21	1961	2	+8 laps	
32	1	(Italy) Jason Wright	ATS 100	1964	2	+8 laps	
33	26	(United Kingdom) Paul Smeeth	Lotus 18	1960	2	+8 laps	
DNS	16	(United States) Howard Cherry	Brabham BT11	1964			
DNS	33	(United Kingdom) John Chisholm	Lotus 18	1960			

=== Série F: Formula 1 Grand Prix Cars (1966–1974) ===
Pos.	No.	Driver	Car	Year	Laps	Time/retired	Grid
1	8	(United States) Duncan Dayton	Brabham BT33	1970	15	26:28.898	
2	24	(United Kingdom) Frank Sytner	Hesketh 308	1974	15	+6.218	1
3	1	(Spain) Joaquín Folch-Rusiñol	McLaren M23	1974	15	+13.162	
4	10	(Italy) Manfredo Rossi di Montelera	BT42/44	1973	15	+33.861	
5	31	(United Kingdom) James Hanson	March 711	1971	15	+33.983	
6	11	(France) Laurent Fort	Surtees TS9B	1971	15	+1:01.996	
7	18	(Belgium) Alain James de Wagter	Surtees TS16	1974	15	+1:11.786	
8	6	(United States) John Delane	Tyrrell 006	1972	14	+1 lap	
9	20	(Brazil) Abba Kogan	Matra MS120C	1971	14	+1 lap	
10	19	(United Kingdom) Andrew Beaumont	Surtees TS16	1974	14	+1 lap	
11	12	(France) Jean-François Decaux	Ferrari 312	1967	14	+1 lap	
12	25	(Italy) Carlo Alberto Steinhauslin	Tecno PA123	1972	13	+2 laps	
13	5	(United States) John Goodman	Ferrari 312B	1971	13	+2 laps	
14	27	(Italy) Giuseppe Bianchini	Tecno E731	1973	12	+3 laps	
15	26	(Italy) Nanni Galli	Tecno PA123	1972	9	+6 laps	
16	30	(United Kingdom) Ron Maydon	Amon AF101	1974	5	+10 laps	
17	14	(Sweden) Peter Wallenberg, Jr.	March 731	1973	4	+11 laps	
18	16	(Monaco) Yves Saguato	Shadow DN3	1974	2	+13 laps	
19	17	(United States) Chris MacAllister	Lotus 49	1967	1	+14 laps	
No lap	7	(United Kingdom) Richard Attwood	Brabham BT26	1969			

=== Série G: Formula 1 Grand Prix Cars (1975–1978) ===
Pos.	No.	Driver	Car	Year	Laps	Time/retired	Grid
1	8	(United Kingdom) Bobby Verdon-Roe	McLaren M26	1977	14	22:15.689	1
2	22	(Belgium) Jean-Michel Martin	Ensign N177	1977	14	+34.598	
3	9	(United States) Michael Fitzgerald	March 761B	1977	14	+45.529	
4	10	(Japan) Katsuaki Kubota	March 761	1976	14	+46.159	
5	20	(New Zealand) Roger Wills	Williams FW05	1976	14	+48.807	
6	16	(United States) Nicholas Colyvas	Shadow DN5	1975	14	+58.322	
7	1	(Belgium) Christophe d'Ansembourg	McLaren M26	1976	13	+1 lap	
8	4	(Italy) Cosimo Turizio	Hesketh 308E	1977	13	+1 lap	
9	19	(United Kingdom) Anthony Hancock	Surtees TS19	1976	13	+1 lap	
10	6	(Netherlands) Nico Bindels	Lotus 77	1976	13	+1 lap	
11	28	(United States) Douglas Mockett	Penske PC3	1975	13	+1 lap	
12	18	(Italy) Giancarlo Casoli	Ferrari 312T	1975	13	+1 lap	
13	27	(Brazil) Abba Kogan	Williams FW06	1978	12	+2 laps	
14	24	(United Kingdom) Frank Lyons	Hesketh 308E	1977	12	+2 laps	
15	23	(New Zealand) David Abbott	McLaren M26	1976	12	+2 laps	
16	14	(Monaco) Stéphane Richelmi	Ensign N175	1975	9	+5 laps	2
17	17	(France) Jean-Louis Duret	Shadow DN5	1975	3	+11 laps	
No lap	3	(United States) Christopher Locke	Lotus 77	1976			
DNS	11	(Spain) Joaquín Folch-Rusiñol	Ferrari 312T3	1978			
DNS	32	(Portugal) Rodrigo Gallego	March 761	1976			

=== Série H: Formula 3, 1600cc (1971–1973) and 2000cc (1974–1984) ===
Pos.	No.	Driver	Car	Year	Laps	Time/retired	Grid
1	1	(Italy) Emanuele Pirro	Martini Mk34	1981	10	19:26.448	1
2	6	(Monaco) Marc Faggionato	Ralt RT3	1983	10	+1.094	
3	3	(United States) Joe Colasacco	Dallara 384	1984	10	+7.767	
4	2	(France) Vincent Savoye	Ralt RT3	1984	10	+8.182	
5	59	(United Kingdom) Richard Trott	Chevron B43	1978	10	+9.511	
6	27	(Monaco) Marcus Mussa	Modus M1	1975	10	+16.658	
7	41	(Monaco) Grant Tromans	Martini Mk34	1981	10	+16.826	
8	18	(Denmark) Palle Ringstrom	March 753	1975	10	+23.096	
9	20	(France) Laurent Vallery-Masson	Martini Mk21B	1978	10	+23.944	
10	33	(United Kingdom) Alastair Davidson	Ralt RT1	1978	10	+25.858	
11	10	(Monaco) Pierre Mare	Ralt RT3	1983	10	+25.904	
12	80	(France) Pierre Lemasson	Chevron B34	1976	10	+26.546	
13	52	(United Kingdom) Hugh Price	Chevron B34	1977	10	+27.762	
14	32	(United Kingdom) Michael Quinn	Ralt RT1	1977	10	+28.714	
15	19	(France) Bernard Honnorat	Lola T670	1978	10	+31.834	
16	15	(Monaco) Mauro Serra	Martini Mk39	1983	10	+32.484	
17	12	(France) Frédéric Leclerc	Martini Mk37	1982	10	+34.461	
18	35	(United Kingdom) Paul Wyeth	March 793	1979	10	+40.945	
19	56	(United Kingdom) Iain Rowley	March 793	1979	10	+1:00.521	
20	8	(Monaco) Fabrice Notari	Ralt RT1	1977	10	+1:03.881	
21	53	(United Kingdom) Chris Drake	March 743	1974	10	+1:04.331	
22	70	(United Kingdom) Peter Dunn	March 733	1973	10	+1:07.300	
23	63	(United Kingdom) Matthew Sturmer	Van Diemen VG376	1976	10	+1:11.315	
24	50	(United Kingdom) David Smithies	March 793	1979	10	+1:12.083	
25	91	(Sweden) Pähr Svensson	Ralt RT1	1976	10	+1:13.355	
26	11	(Monaco) Alexandre Pasta	Martini Mk37	1982	10	+1:18.944	
27	9	(Monaco) Alain Brombal	Martini Mk39	1983	10	+1:31.432	
28	25	(Denmark) Povl Barfod	G.R.D. 373	1973	10	+1:37.563	
29	67	(Germany) Peter Prause	Ensign LNF3	1973	10	+1:38.394	
30	14	(Italy) Angela Grasso	Dallara 382	1982	10	+1:58.519	
31	22	(United Kingdom) Albert Clements	Lotus 69	1971	10	+2:09.554	
32	21	(Italy) Carlo Maria del Conte	Ensign LNF3	1972	9	+1 lap	
33	60	(United Kingdom) Vernon Williamson	Dastle Mk9	1972	9	+1 lap	
34	58	(United Kingdom) Patrick Gormley	Safir RJ03	1975	8	+2 laps	
35	7	(Italy) Valerio Leone	March 783	1978	5	+5 laps	
36	4	(Monaco) Roland de Rechniewski	Modus M1	1975	5	+5 laps	
37	5	(Monaco) Richard Hein	Ralt RT3	1983	4	+6 laps	
38	24	(United Kingdom) Tom Powell	Chevron B20	1972	4	+6 laps	
39	23	(France) Thierry Gallo	Argo JM1	1978	1	+9 laps	
No lap	28	(United Kingdom) Paul Smith	Chevron B38	1977			
DNS	16	(Switzerland) Ivan Scotti	Chevron B38	1977			
