= 2006 Historic Grand Prix of Monaco =

← Previous race	Next race →
- Circuit de Monaco

Race details
- Date: 20–21 May 2006
- Official name: 5e Grand Prix de Monaco Historique
- Location: Circuit de Monaco
- Course: Street circuit
- Course length: 3.340 km (2.075 miles)

The 2006 Historic Grand Prix of Monaco was the fifth running of the Historic Grand Prix of Monaco, a motor racing event for heritage Grand Prix, Voiturettes, Formula One, Formula Two and Sports cars.

== Report ==
Stefan Schollwoeck took a surprise pole and victory in Race A, driving a Maserati 6CM in a race usually dominated by ERAs. Jost Wildbolz, one of the pre-event favourites, topped the first practice session only for gearbox problems to draw his weekend to a close.

Stirling Moss entered Race B in the Ferguson P99, a car he had previously nominated as the greatest F1 car he ever drove, but was forced to retire when a driveshaft broke in practice. The race was dominated by Duncan Dayton, while Jos Koster and Tony Smith fought hard for the final step on the podium.

Joe Colasacco was very strong in practice for Race D, but was disqualified before the race due to uncertainties over his car's legality. The race was dominated by Denis Welch.

Michael Schryver secured pole position in Race E but retired early with gearbox and steering rack issues.

Race F pitted Monaco sparring partners Dayton and Joaquín Folch-Rusiñol against each other yet again. Under pressure, Folch-Rusiñol overshot the Nouvelle Chicance on the final lap but held the lead to the chequered flag. However, he was deemed to have gained an advantage by not slowing down enough and was dropped to second place after the race. Jacques Nicolet and Andrea Burani collided in qualifying and did not make the race start.

In Race G, Martin Stretton hit the wall during first qualifying and damaged the chassis of his Tyrrell P34, but made enough repairs by the second session to secure a place on the front row. In the race, he led at the first corner while Peter Williams collided with a spinning Peter Wuensch behind, triggering a safety car that kept the field bunched together. This created a tense battle for the lead during the final laps. Polesitter Paul Edwards attempted a bold move for the lead around the outside at Loews Hairpin on the final tour, but made contact and brushed the barriers, ending up classified the first car a lap down.

== Results ==
=== Summary ===
Série	Cars	Years	Pole position		Fastest lap		Race winner
A	Grand Prix	Pre-1947	(Germany) Stefan Schollwoeck	2:05.045	(Germany) Stefan Schollwoeck	2:05.432	(Germany) Stefan Schollwoeck
B	Grand Prix - front engine	1947-1960	(United States) Duncan Dayton	1:56.163	(United States) Duncan Dayton	1:58.984	(United States) Duncan Dayton
C	Sports cars	Pre-1953	(United Kingdom) John Ure	2:11.600	(Germany) Albert Otten	2:13.793	(United Kingdom) John Ure
D	Formula Junior - rear engine		(United Kingdom) Denis Welch	1:56.187	(United Kingdom) Denis Welch	1:54.730	(United Kingdom) Denis Welch
E	Grand Prix - rear engine	1954-1965	(United Kingdom) Michael Schryver	1:53.611	(United States) James King	1:54.827	(United Kingdom) Nick Wigley
F	Formula 1	1966-1974	(United States) Duncan Dayton	1:37.465	(United States) Duncan Dayton	1:37.128	(United States) Duncan Dayton
G	Formula 1	1975-1978	(United States) Paul Edwards	1:34.062	(United States) Paul Edwards	1:36.006	(United Kingdom) Martin Stretton

=== Série A: Pre 1947 Grand Prix Cars ===
Pos.	No.	Driver	Car	Year	Laps	Time/retired	Grid
1	24	(Germany) Stefan Schollwoeck	Maserati 6CM	1937	10	21:17.651	1
2	16	(United States) Ian Landy	ERA B	1936	10	+16.118	
3	1	(Germany) Rainer Ott	ERA B	1936	10	+30.291	
4	11	(Republic of Ireland) Paddins Dowling	ERA B	1936	10	+35.319	
5	14	(Germany) Robert Fink	Alfa Romeo P3	1932	10	+41.073	
6	4	(Switzerland) Georg Kaufmann	Maserati 4CL	1939	10	+56.650	
7	17	(United Kingdom) Tony Smith	Alfa Romeo P3	1934	10	+1:07.665	
8	15	(United States) Warren Spieker	Alfa Romeo P3	1932	10	+2:07.822	
9	19	(France) Jean-Jacques Strub	Bugatti 35/51	1926	10	+2:10.469	
10	3	(Germany) Oliver Maierhofer	Maserati 4CL	1946	9	+1 lap	
11	5	(Switzerland) Christophe Burckhardt	Bugatti 37/44	1927	9	+1 lap	
12	20	(United Kingdom) Duncan Pittaway	Bugatti 35	1925	9	+1 lap	
13	30	(United Kingdom) Philip Champion	Frazer Nash Supersports	1928	9	+1 lap	
14	18	(United States) Tom Price	Alta GP	1936	9	+1 lap	
15	25	(Austria) Herbert Handlbauer	Alfa Romeo 12C	1937	9	+1 lap	
16	22	(United Kingdom) Julia de Baldanza	Bugatti 35B	1929	9	+1 lap	
17	6	(Netherlands) Marcel Sontrop	Bugatti 37	1927	9	+1 lap	
18	8	(Monaco) Jean-Claude Miloe	Delage 1500	1927	9	+1 lap	
19	2	(Germany) Helmut Gassmann	Maserati 8CM	1934	8	+2 laps	
20	21	(Netherlands) Lucas Slijpen	Bugatti 35	1925	8	+2 laps	
21	10	(Austria) Corrado Cupellini	Maserati 26B	1927	5	+5 laps	
DNS	7	(France) Ralf Emmerling	Riley Brooklands	1928			
DNS	12	(United Kingdom) Robert Newall	Bugatti 35	1926			
DNS	26	(Switzerland) Jost Wildbolz	ERA A	1935			
DNS	66	(Italy) Tommaso Gelmini	Maserati 6CM/4CM	1936			

=== Série B: Front Engine Grand Prix Cars (1947–1960) ===
Pos.	No.	Driver	Car	Year	Laps	Time/retired	Grid
1	1	(United States) Duncan Dayton	Lotus 16	1959	10	20:07.936	1
2	23	(United Kingdom) Barrie Baxter	Tec-Mec-Maserati	1959	10	+30.334	
3	10	(Netherlands) Jos Koster	Maserati 250F "Piccolo"	1958	10	+46.622	
4	12	(United Kingdom) Tony Smith	Ferrari 246	1960	10	+47.169	
5	19	(United Kingdom) Ian Nuthall	Alta F2	1952	10	+1:09.559	
6	18	(Belgium) Paul Grant	Cooper T23 (Mk2)	1953	10	+1:10.094	
7	34	(Germany) Michael Hinderer	Maserati 250F	1955	10	+1:50.384	
8	9	(United Kingdom) Andrew Cameron	Cooper T23 (Mk2)	1953	10	+1:51.981	
9	21	(United Kingdom) David Wenman	Connaught A4	1952	9	+1 lap	
10	3	(United Kingdom) "Dr. Spike Milligan"	Connaught A7	1952	9	+1 lap	
11	28	(Switzerland) Peter Heuberger	Maserati 250F	1956	9	+1 lap	
12	17	(Australia) Greg Snape	Kieft GP1	1954	9	+1 lap	
13	22	(United Kingdom) Barry Wood	Cooper T20 (Mk1)	1952	9	+1 lap	
14	6	(Austria) Jean-Robert Grellet	Connaught A8	1952	9	+1 lap	
15	5	(United Kingdom) David Bennett	Maserati A6GCM	1953/54	9	+1 lap	
16	20	(United Kingdom) Julia de Baldanza	Maserati A6GCM	1951	9	+1 lap	
17	4	(France) Jean-Jacques Bally	Gordini T15	1948	9	+1 lap	
18	11	(Austria) Winfried Kallinger	Cisitalia D46	1947	8	+2 laps	
19	8	(United Kingdom) Nick Wigley	Connaught B	1954	4	+6 laps	
DNS	2	(Portugal) José Manuel Albuquerque	Maserati 250F	1954			
DNS	7	(United Kingdom) Stirling Moss	Ferguson P99	1960			
DNS	14	(United States) Tom Price	Maserati 250F	1956			
DNS	15	(Netherlands) Adrien van der Kroft	Connaught A3	1952			
DNS	16	(United Kingdom) Michael Steele	Connaught C	1956/57			
DNS	24	(Spain) Joaquín Folch-Rusiñol	Lotus 16	1959			

=== Série C: Pre 1953 Sports Cars ===
Pos.	No.	Driver	Car	Year	Laps	Time/retired	Grid
1	28	(United Kingdom) John Ure	Frazer Nash Le Mans Replica (Mk2)	1952	10	23:03.744	1
2	25	(United Kingdom) David Wenman	Jaguar C-Type	1952	10	+4.876	
3	17	(United Kingdom) Alan Minshaw	Jaguar C-Type	1952	10	+5.446	
4	6	(United Kingdom) David Franklin	BMW 328	1938	10	+6.884	
5	22	(Germany) Albert Otten	Allard J2	1950	10	+9.588	
6	23	(United Kingdom) Eddie McGuire	Gordini T15S	1949	10	+16.357	
7	16	(Germany) Wolfgang Friedrichs	Aston Martin DB3	1952	10	+20.804	
8	96	(Germany) Michael Willms	Ferrari 340 America	1950	10	+31.595	
9	94	(Spain) Jose Fernandez	Ferrari 225 S	1952	10	+39.285	
10	8	(United Kingdom) Colin Pearcy	Frazer Nash Le Mans Replica (Mk2)	1952	10	+51.820	
11	10	(United Kingdom) Philip Champion	Frazer Nash Mille Miglia	1951	10	+59.480	
12	24	(United Kingdom) Jo Bamford	Ferrari 340 America	1952	10	+1:48.883	
13	21	(United States) Bruce McCaw	Mercedes-Benz W194	1952	10	+2:37.807	
14	14	(Spain) Juan Quintano	Ferrari 166 MM	1949	9	+1 lap	
15	18	(United States) Stephen Dudley	Ferrari 166/195 S	1950	9	+1 lap	
16	77	(United States) Alan Patterson	Allard J2X	1952	9	+1 lap	
17	7	(Switzerland) Philippe Burckhardt	BMW 328	1939	9	+1 lap	
18	11	(United Kingdom) Stephen Curtis	Frazer Nash Le Mans Replica	1950	9	+1 lap	
19	2	(France) Antoine Blasco	OSCA MT4	1952	9	+1 lap	
20	1	(Spain) Carlos de Miguel	OSCA MT4	1949	9	+1 lap	
21	5	(Italy) Marco Masini	Stanguellini Ermini	1949	9	+1 lap	
22	3	(United Kingdom) Mary Grant-Jonkers	Cisitalia 202 SMM	1947	8	+2 laps	
23	19	(United Kingdom) Neil Hadfield	Jaguar C-Type	1952	6	+4 laps	
24	15	(United Kingdom) Nigel Webb	Jaguar C-Type	1952	1	+9 laps	
25	9	(Germany) Paul Singer	Veritas RS2000	1948	1	+9 laps	

=== Série D: Formula Junior – Rear engine ===
Pos.	No.	Driver	Car	Year	Laps	Time/retired	Grid
1	3	(United Kingdom) Denis Welch	Merlyn Mk5/7	1963	10	19:35.410	1
2	4	(United Kingdom) Edwin Jowsey	Lotus 22	1962	10	+12.606	
3	15	(Monaco) Marcus Mussa	Brabham BT2	1962	10	+23.122	
4	11	(United Kingdom) John Fyda	Lotus 22	1962	10	+24.659	
5	12	(Monaco) Richard Hein	Lotus 22	1962	10	+25.442	
6	8	(United Kingdom) Anthony Binnington	Cooper T67	1963	10	+35.803	
7	9	(Switzerland) Bruno Schaffner	Lotus 20/22	1961	10	+48.577	
8	88	(United Kingdom) Martin Walford	Lotus 22	1962	10	+59.048	
9	7	(United Kingdom) Simon Diffey	Lotus 20	1961	10	+1:06.244	
10	57	(United Kingdom) Robin Longdon	Lola Mk5A	1963	10	+1:06.270	
11	24	(Monaco) Yves Saguato	Merlyn Mk5	1963	10	+1:07.856	
12	14	(Monaco) Marc Faggionato	Lotus 22	1962	10	+1:09.616	
13	90	(United Kingdom) James Hicks	Caravelle Mk3	1960	10	+1:23.300	
14	25	(Monaco) Pierre Mare	Lotus 18	1960	10	+1:29.487	
15	5	(Australia) Peter Strauss	Brabham BT6	1963	10	+1:52.308	
16	22	(United Kingdom) Derek Walker	Crosslé 4F	1960	10	+1:53.267	
17	26	(United Kingdom) John Chisholm	Gemini Mk3A	1961	9	+1 lap	
18	27	(United Kingdom) Chris Drake	Elva 300	1961	9	+1 lap	
19	28	(United Kingdom) Malcolm Cook	Deep Sanderson	1960	9	+1 lap	
20	23	(United Kingdom) Andrew Taylor	Britannia	1960	9	+1 lap	
21	17	(Belgium) Luc Deneve	Lotus 18	1960	9	+1 lap	
22	2	(Italy) Alessandro Ripamonti	De Tomaso	1962	8	+2 laps	
23	31	(United Kingdom) Mark Green	Lotus 18	1958/59	8	+2 laps	
24	19	(United Kingdom) Michael Waller	Kieft	1960	8	+2 laps	
25	73	(Italy) Fabio d'Alberti	Lotus 22	1963	6	+4 laps	
26	29	(United Kingdom) Don Thallon	Cooper T56	1961	6	+4 laps	
27	18	(Japan) Keiichi Murakami	Lotus 18	1960	3	+7 laps	
28	10	(Italy) Paolo Marzatico	Branca	1963	2	+8 laps	
29	30	(Monaco) Andrea Giuliani	Wainer	1960	1	+9 laps	
DSQ	1	(United States) Joe Colasacco	Stanguellini Delfino	1962			
DNS	6	(United Kingdom) Tony Goodwin	Brabham BT6	1963			
DNS	16	(France) Jacques Natali	Lotus 20	1961			
DNS	20	(United Kingdom) Douglas Martin	Elva 200	1960			
DNS	21	(United Kingdom) Richard Utley	Caravelle Mk1	1960			

=== Série E: Rear Engined Grand Prix Cars (1954–1965) ===
Pos.	No.	Driver	Car	Year	Laps	Time/retired	Grid
1	32	(United Kingdom) Nick Wigley	Cooper T51	1959	10	21:14.798	
2	10	(United Kingdom) Barry Cannell	Cooper T53	1960	10	+5.585	
3	2	(United States) James King	Brabham BT7	1963	10	+6.403	
4	15	(United States) Michael Fitzgerald	Lola Mk4	1962	10	+14.547	
5	19	(United Kingdom) Sidney Hoole	Cooper T66	1963	10	+20.853	
6	35	(Belgium) Michel Wanty	Lotus 24	1962	10	+36.718	
7	16	(United States) Howard Cherry	Brabham BT11	1964	10	+39.805	
8	28	(United Kingdom) Malcolm Ricketts	Lotus 21	1961	10	+40.345	
9	9	(United States) Kurt DelBene	BRP-BRM	1964	10	+42.022	
10	30	(United States) Douglas Mockett	Cooper T53	1961	10	+49.697	
11	23	(United Kingdom) Christopher Mann	Lotus 18	1960	10	+49.701	
12	27	(United Kingdom) David Clark	BRM P57	1960/61	10	+1:06.496	
13	11	(United Kingdom) Rodger Newman	Brabham BT14	1965	10	+1:06.845	
14	33	(Switzerland) Michael Gans	De Tomaso	1961	10	+1:19.531	
15	7	(Australia) Richard Longes	Cooper T51	1959	10	+1:22.343	
16	17	(Argentina) Jorge Ferioli	Lola Mk4	1962	10	+1:23.197	
17	25	(Germany) Richard Weiland	Lotus 24	1962	10	+1:32.940	
18	8	(United Kingdom) John Elliott	Lotus 18	1961	10	+1:42.308	
19	3	(United States) Murray Smith	Lotus 24	1962	10	+1:50.909	
20	12	(Italy) Paolo Gecchelin	Lotus 18	1959	9	+1 lap	
21	20	(United Kingdom) Marshall Bailey	JBW Type 1	1959	8	+2 laps	
22	1	(United Kingdom) Roy Walzer	Brabham BT11	1964	6	+4 laps	
23	21	(Italy) Daniele Salodini	JBW	1961	6	+4 laps	
24	6	(United Kingdom) Rick Hall	BRM P48	1960	3	+7 laps	
25	4	(United Kingdom) Robert Lamplough	Lotus 33	1965	3	+7 laps	
26	31	(United Kingdom) James Hanson	Scirocco F1	1962	2	+8 laps	
27	18	(United Kingdom) John Clark	Cooper T51	1959	1	+9 laps	
28	26	(United Kingdom) Michael Schryver	Lotus 18	1960	1	+9 laps	1
29	29	(United Kingdom) Brian Anthony Ashby	Emeryson F1	1961	1	+9 laps	
DNS	14	(United Kingdom) Allan Miles	Cooper T41	1957			
DNS	22	(United Kingdom) Alan Baillie	Cooper T71/73	1964			
DNS	34	(Belgium) André Wanty	Lotus 18/21	1961			

=== Série F: Formula 1 Cars (1966–1974) ===
Pos.	No.	Driver	Car	Year	Laps	Time/retired	Grid
1	8	(United States) Duncan Dayton	Brabham BT33	1970	15	29:23.076	1
2	23	(Spain) Joaquín Folch-Rusiñol	McLaren M23	1974	15	+9.761	
3	28	(United Kingdom) Christopher Perkins	Surtees TS16	1974	15	+17.972	
4	10	(Italy) Manfredo Rossi di Montelera	BT42/43	1973	15	+18.318	
5	33	(United Kingdom) Paul Knapfield	Brabham BT42	1973	15	+20.718	
6	27	(United Kingdom) Mike Wrigley	March 711	1971	15	+26.316	
7	4	(United States) John Delane	Tyrrell 001	1970	15	+27.747	
8	2	(United Kingdom) Alistair Morrison	Lotus 72	1971	15	+46.871	
9	31	(Belgium) Christophe d'Ansembourg	Lotus 76/2	1974	15	+51.067	
10	30	(United Kingdom) Ron Maydon	Amon AF101	1974	15	+1:13.894	
11	18	(France) Christophe Caternet	March 701	1970	15	+1:17.187	
12	11	(United Kingdom) Lorina McLaughlin	McLaren M23	1974	15	+1:19.261	
13	1	(Japan) Katsuaki Kubota	Lotus 49B	1968	15	+1:29.000	
14	5	(United States) Robert Baker	Brabham BT33	1970	14	+1 lap	
15	25	(United Kingdom) Robert Lamplough	BRM P133	1967	14	+1 lap	
16	26	(United Kingdom) David Brown	March 721	1972	14	+1 lap	
17	17	(United States) Brad Krause	BRM P126	1968	3	+12 laps	
18	9	(United States) Richard Carlino	Surtees TS9B	1971	14	+1 lap	
19	24	(United Kingdom) Judith Lyons	Surtees TS9	1971	13	+2 laps	
20	7	(Italy) Massimo Comelli	Cooper T86B	1968	12	+3 laps	
21	3	(Japan) Keiichi Murakami	Lotus 72D	1970	10	+5 laps	
22	32	(France) Jean-Louis Duret	Lotus 76	1974	8	+7 laps	
23	34	(Italy) Lorenzo Prandina	Tecno PA123	1972	3	+12 laps	
24	16	(Australia) Scotty Taylor	Shadow DN3	1974	1	+14 laps	
DNS	6	(United States) Ryan Delane	Tyrrell 006	1972			
DNS	12	(France) Jean Guikas	Ferrari 312B3	1974			
DNS	14	(France) Jacques Nicolet	BRM P201	1974			
DNS	15	(Italy) Andrea Burani	McLaren M19A	1971			
DNS	20	(Monaco) Yves Saguato	Matra MS120C	1971			
DNS	22	(Italy) Giuseppe Bianchini	Tecno	1973			

=== Série G: Formula 1 Cars (1975–1978) ===
Pos.	No.	Driver	Car	Year	Laps	Time/retired	Grid
1	4	(United Kingdom) Martin Stretton	Tyrrell P34	1977	15	30:22.440	2
2	14	(United Kingdom) Simon Hadfield	Penske PC3	1975	15	+1.544	3
3	10	(Italy) Mauro Pane	Tyrrell P34	1976	15	+1.894	
4	12	(Netherlands) John Bosch	Ferrari 312T3	1978	15	+4.307	
5	15	(Monaco) Jean-Pierre Richelmi	Ensign N175	1975	15	+12.196	
6	9	(United Kingdom) James Denty	Shadow DN5	1975	15	+31.055	
7	27	(United Kingdom) Andrew Wareing	Williams FW06	1978	15	+40.102	
8	8	(United Kingdom) Frank Lyons	McLaren M26	1976	15	+40.353	
9	35	(United Kingdom) Peter Dunn	March 761	1976	15	+41.363	
10	5	(United States) Christopher Locke	Lotus 77	1976	15	+42.693	
11	2	(United States) Steve Earle	McLaren M23	1977	15	+52.269	
12	1	(United States) Chris MacAllister	Ferrari 312T2	1976	15	+53.348	
13	21	(Italy) Giancarlo Casoli	Ferrari 312T	1975	15	+1:11.803	
14	3	(Switzerland) Andrea Bahlsen	Tyrrell 008	1978	15	+1:12.288	
15	19	(Monaco) Mauro Serra	Surtees TS19	1976	15	+1:20.848	
16	28	(United States) Paul Edwards	Penske PC3	1975	14	+1 lap	1
17	11	(Italy) Walter Burani	Ferrari 312T	1975	14	+1 lap	
18	16	(United States) Danny Baker	Shadow DN5	1975	4	+11 laps	
19	18	(Portugal) Rodrigo Gallego	March 761/8	1976	4	+11 laps	
No lap	20	(Germany) Peter Wuensch	Wolf WR1/2	1977			
No lap	22	(United Kingdom) Peter Williams	March 761	1976			
DNS	6	(Netherlands) Nico Bindels	Lotus 77	1976			
DNS	24	(United Kingdom) Graham Willcox	Hesketh 308C	1976			
