= Denis Welch =

British racing driver and businessman

Denis Welch (16 March 1945 – 27 July 2014) was a British racing driver and businessman.

== Denis Welch Motorsport ==
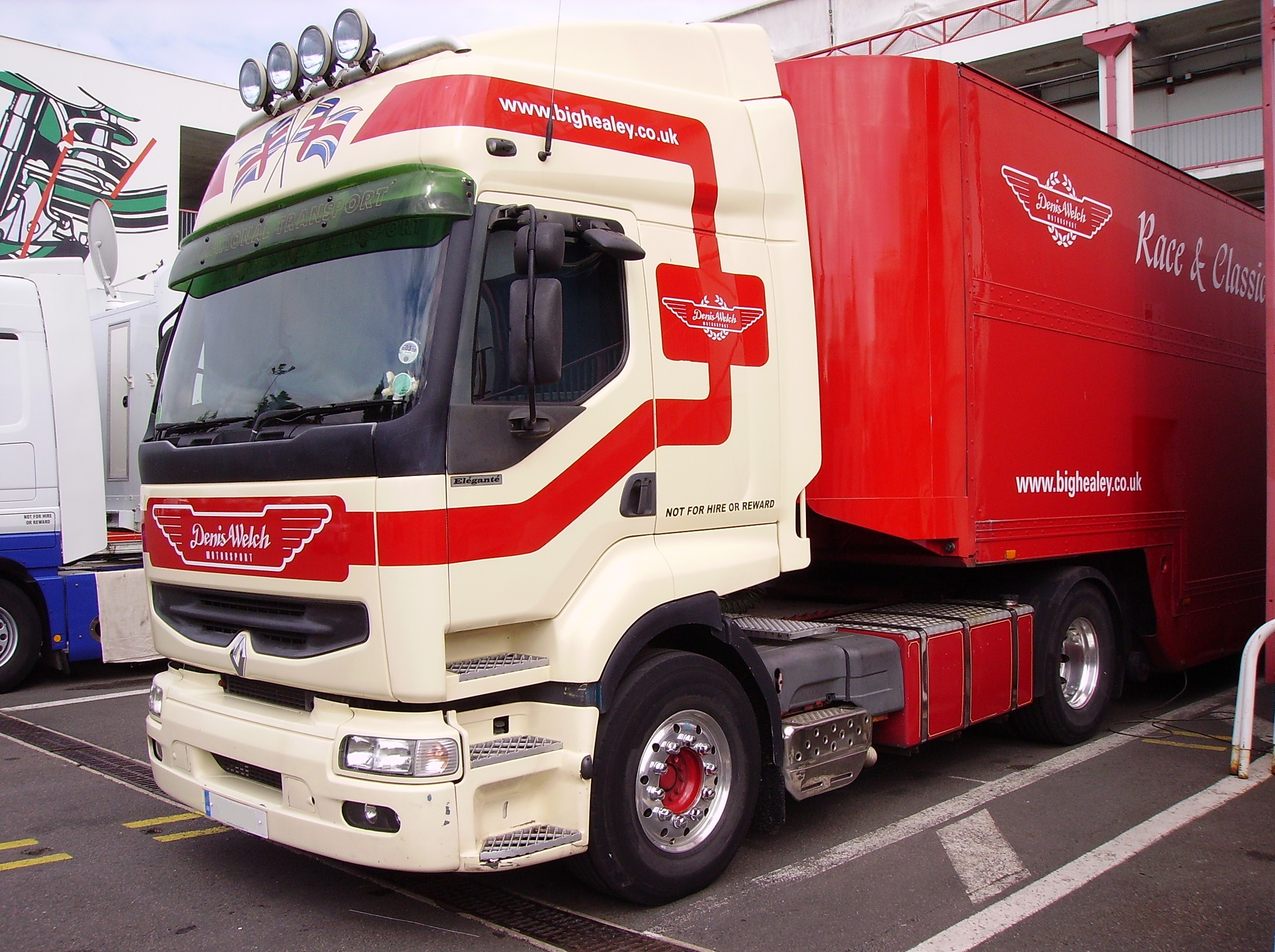
Race transport, Circuit de Nevers Magny-Cours (France)

Welch founded Denis Welch Motorsport in 1976, specialising in parts for Austin-Healey and Jaguar cars. The company remanufactures parts for classic racing cars which would otherwise be impossible to obtain. His son Jeremy took over the company in 2007.

== Historic racing ==
Welch started racing in 1965. He took motorsport seriously but did not have ambitions to race professionally; he focused on building his engineering company and continued to race on the side.

Welch was particularly noted for his red 1959 Austin-Healey 3000, nicknamed The Bulldog and with registration 6200 NO, which he drove to great success in a flamboyant, oversteering style. He purchased the car in 1979 and fully restored it, going on to win a multitude of races including the Eifel Classic at the Nürburgring Nordschleife and events at Bathurst. He won the HSCC Pre-1960 Historic Sports Car Championship in 1986 and 1987, and the HSCC Classic Sports Car Championship in 1988, 1991 and 1992. Along with son Jeremy, he drove the car to a narrow second in the 1997 Motor Classic Six Hours of Spa, only losing the lead in the final half-hour when a backmarker cost them a penalty. Victories at Brands Hatch in 1993 and Donington Park in 1996 also received magazine coverage.

Welch was an accomplished historic Formula Junior racer and drove a Merlyn for many years in the FIA Lurani Trophy, the first officially sanctioned historic motorsport series. He never won the title, but lost out on a tie-break in 2004. His first single-seater race weekend in 25 years came at Donington Park in 1995, where he netted a second-place and third-place finish. A selection of his Formula Junior victories were at Dijon-Prenois in 2001, at the Nürburgring in 2001 and 2004, at Pau in 2001, in the wet and the dry at Donington Park in 2004 and 2005, at Monza in 2004 for the closest finish ever recorded at the circuit (0.003 s), and at Silverstone in 2008. In addition, Welch won the Formula Junior race at the Historic Grand Prix of Monaco in 2000, 2002 and 2006; the victory in 2000 was his first in the category and he was elated after the race:

"I’ve waited a long time for a Junior win, so this is magic. I’d never classed myself as that good a driver, but to see Stirling Moss half out of his car, waving and cheering as I came in, was incredible."

In 2003, the Macau Grand Prix celebrated its golden jubilee by running two races for historic cars: the GP Anniversary Trophy and the Golden Jubilee Cup. Welch finished third in both races, driving a Lotus 23B. He had previously won in this car at Donington Park the same year. He won at Estoril in an Elva GT car in 2004.

== Death ==
Welch crashed fatally during the 2014 Silverstone Classic. He had entered a Lotus 18 into the Jack Brabham Memorial Trophy for pre-1966 Formula One cars. Gearbox issues during qualifying had forced him to start toward the back of the field. Two cars ahead of him collided on the opening lap and he was unable to avoid them, making contact and launching his own car into a roll. He was taken to the circuit's medical centre but later succumbed to his injuries.
