= Colchester Racing Developments =

British racing car constructor

- Type: Ltd.
- Industry: Automotive
- Founded: Colchester, 1960
- Founder: Selwyn Hayward
- Headquarters: Manningtree, Essex, Great Britain
- Owner: Clive Hayward
- Divisions: CRD Tool and Engineering Ltd.
- Website: Official website

Colchester Racing Developments produced Merlyn racing cars from 1960 to 1979. The company was founded by Clive Maskrey, Selwyn Hayward and continued by Hayward's brother, Clive. When the manufacture of Merlyn racing cars stopped, Clive Hayward continued to manufacture Merlyn parts as CRD Tool and Engineering Ltd. This company stopped trading in November 2015. Still, Clive Hayward continues to run Colchester Racing Developments, manufacturing Merlyn components and carrying out chassis repairs.

== History ==
- Founded: 1960
- Team principal(s): Clive Hayward
- Founder(s): Selwyn Hayward
- Former series: BRSCC Formula Junior (1962); British Formula 3 (1964); French Formula 3 (1964); British Formula 2 (1964-1965); Trophées de France (1964-1965); British Sports Car Championship (1964); European Formula 2 (1968-1969)
- Noted drivers: (United Kingdom) Jonathan Williams (1962) (Belgium) Teddy Pilette (1964) (United Kingdom) David Hobbs (1964-1966) (United Kingdom) Chris Irwin (1964-1965) (Australia) Dave Walker (1967) (United Kingdom) Brian Hart (1968-1969) (United Kingdom) Robin Widdows (1969)

=== 1960s ===
The first Merlyn was the Mark 1, a Formula Junior car which was never raced. The car was designed by Selwyn Hayward. It had just one feature uncommon at the time: it was mid-engined, when the majority of other cars were front-engined. Merlyns proved popular, even the face of competition from Coopers. Performance in Britain was mediocre, but better in the U.S. Future Formula 1 driver Teddy Pilette drove a Mark 3 in various Formula Junior races, and attempted to build a Formula One variant. Ian Raby drove a Mark 3 in the BRSCC Formula Junior entered by Empire Racing Team. The following year Merlyns were entered in the BRSCC Formula Junior by Raby and Malcolm Fruitnight. The best result was a few top five finishes at Brands Hatch. 1962 was also the first year Merlyn Racing entered the prestigious Monaco Formula 3 Grand Prix. The 1962 race was no success. Driver John Brown did not manage to qualify. Factory driver Jonathan Williams achieved a fifth-place finish driving a prototype Mark 5.

The company was sufficiently successful in developing a Mark 4 sports car, built to FIA Appendix C regulations. It and the Mark 4A could be powered by either an 1,100 cc (67 cu in) Ford Anglia inline four or 1,998 cc (122 cu in) SOHC Coventry Climax. In Britain, these were mated to a four-speed gearbox, as the Mark 4T; in international racing, these cars were fitted with a Hewland/Volkswagen 5-speed. A Mark 4A driven by Richard Redgrave finished second in the 1963 Copenhagen Cup at the Roskilde Ring. By then, Merlyns had coil springs and dampers horizontally mounted, operated by rods from the suspension. Increasingly competitive Formula Junior racing kept works drivers Roy Pike and Jonathan Williams from dominating.

In 1964, the Mark 6 sports car (an improved Mark 4) and Formula 3 and Formula 2 Mark 7 appeared, as Formula Junior was effectively replaced. The Formula Two version faced stiff competition from Brabhams, though future Formula One driver Chris Irwin scored several wins in one. He drove it in the BARC Formula 3 and the British Formula 3. With three podium finishes in the British championship and a win in the BARC championship, Irwin achieved good results. A Merlyn MK 6 was entered by the team in the Group 7 British Sports Car Championship where it achieved some top 10 results. American driver Charles Barns won the SCCA National Championship Runoffs in the G Modified class in 1964. Barnes competed his Mark 6 at the Runoffs in 1964 and 1965. Six Merlyns were entered into the 1965 Monaco Formula 3 Grand Prix. Three of the cars, including Iriwn's, made it to the final race. The British works driver started fifth and ended up on the podium in second place. Vincent Palmaro finished as last running driver, in 17th. The third Merlyn, driven by Roger Brash, did not finish. Irwin and Roger Mac were entered by Merlyn in the Trophées de France. The pair achieved no major results. Eleven Mark 7s were built in both F2 and F3 guise. The car's successor, the Mark 9, had some improvements increasing the fuel capacity.

The Mark 8 sports car debuted in 1965, but proved unsuccessful; only a small number were built. The Formula Three Mark 9s and 9As also suffered.

For 1967, Formula 2 engine capacity was increased to 1.6-litre. The Merlyn Formula 2 cars were uncompetitive with the downsized Formula 1 cars. The production Mark 10 cost only £950, compared to £1450 for a Brabham. The Formula 3 Mark 10 achieved some good results with Tony Lanfranchi: The British driver achieved four podium finishes and one win in the British championship. The factory team had a good run at the Grand Prix Adriatique at the Opatija Circuit in former Yugoslavia. Dave Walker finished first and other factory driver Martin Stephani finished third. The whole top five drove Merlyn cars.

The Mark 11, which debuted that year, was highly popular in the newly-introduced Formula Ford, including one driven by Australia's Tim Schenken, who handily won his first ten events in one. In 1968, Tony Lanfranchi was runner-up position in the BRSCC Formula 3 championship, 11 points behind Schenken. 1968 also saw the introduction of Merlyn's first Formula Ford car, the Mark 11. In its first year, Schenken took the BRSCC Formula Ford 1600 championship title. The following season was also highly successful with Luiz Pereira Bueno finishing second in the championship. Emerson Fittipaldi drove a Merlyn for a short time in the Formula Ford championship before graduating into Formula 3. This Mark 11A, chassis 238, had become known as the 'Magic Merlyn'. Fittipaldi sold the car to Colin Vandervell for the 1970 season. The Mark 12, designed for Formula 2 and powered by a Cosworth FVA, was chosen by Bob Gerard's F2 team. The Mark 12 scored one point in the European championship with Brian Hart in 1968. The following season brought even less success, with the class dominated by Formula 1 constructors.

The Mark 14 was very successful in 1969 and 1970, ranking near the top in both F3 and FF. This was aided by having one in the hands of future Formula One World Champion Fittipaldi. Colin Vandervell drove the ex-Fittipaldi car to 29 Formula Ford wins, and the championship, in 1970.

=== 1970s ===
For 1970, two totally new cars were introduced: the Mark 15, for Formula B in the U.S., and the inexpensive Mark 16 sports car, for the short-lived Formula F100 championship. The Mark 16 was powered by a 1.3-litre Ford Escort engine. This class had to become the sports car racing equivalent of Formula Ford. However, the class folded after just a few seasons. Meanwhile, in Formula Ford Colin Vandervell drove the 'Magic Merlyn' to 29 wins, and victory in the BRSCC Formula Ford championship.

The Merlyn Mark 11 chassis was highly popular in Brazil. Many drivers drove the cars in the Brazilian championship among them Vern Schuppan. In Canada a Merlyn MK 17 won the CASC Quebec Region Formula Ford 1600 championship. The 'Magic Merlyn' returned to the track in 1971 with Jody Scheckter. Scheckter ended up fourth in the European Formula Ford Championship. The BRSCC championship was won by Bernard Vermilio in a MK 20. Scheckter would also compete in a Merlyn in Formula 3. The South African driver won one race running a half season in the BRSCC F3. This was the only Merlyn car scoring points in the BRSCC championship.

The British Formula Atlantic was launched in 1971. Merlyn updated the MK 14 Formula 3 car to fit the specifications. Mike Fraser started two races in the championship, with a best result of eighth. The car returned in 1972 with Mick Jones who finished consistently in the top-ten. Merlyn Formula B cars also made their way to the United States. Gordon Smiley entered a Merlyn MK 21 in the SCCA Continental Championship for Formula B/C. The American driver won the race at Road Atlanta. He finished fifth in the standings.

By 1972 Merlyn was no longer competitive in Formula 3. The best result was achieved by Swede Håkan Dahlqvist in the Coupe d'Europe at Magny-Cours where he finished sixth. In Formula Ford Merlyn was highly competitive. Three Merlyn chassis finished in the top ten of the 1972 Formula Ford Festival. Dave Loring finished fourth, Patrick Nève sixth and Hans Binder ninth. The following year Robert Arnott finished third at the festival. Merlyn chassis finished one-two in the Formula Ford Euroseries in 1973. Bengt Gilhorn finished first followed by Hans Binder.

Many Formula Ford cars, Marlyn's primary focus in the 1970s, were exported to the US to race in the club racing scene; a typical car, the Mark 23, cost £2200, complete with engine and transmission (or £1600 as a bare chassis) in 1974. Some were used by racing schools like the Jim Russell Racing Driver School. Bob Arnott won the Townsend Thooreson Championship in 1972 at the wheel of a Mark 20 and Tim Brise piloted a highly modified Merlyn, while American David Loring drove a Mark 21, previously driven by Smiley, in the CASC Formula Atlantic in 1974. His best result came at Westwood where he finished fourth. The Formula Ford cars were ending up less competitive through the seasons. Competition from Lola, Royale, Van Diemen and many others prevented Merlyn from winning any major championships. Due to a combination of factors like the loss of a major client and the unfavorable dollar-Pound exchange rate, Colchester Racing Developments ended the production of racecars in 1979.

=== Current status ===
Clive Hayward continues to run Colchester Racing Developments Ltd manufacturing Merlyn parts and carrying out Merlyn chassis repairs.

Colchester Racing cars are still used in historic racing, winning the Historic Grand Prix of Monaco with Denis Welch in 2000, 2002, and 2006.

== Racing cars ==
Year	Model	Racing series	Note
1960	Merlyn MK 1	Formula Junior	Front engined car
1961	Merlyn MK 2	Formula Junior	Updated version of the MK 1
1962	Merlyn MK 3	Formula Junior	First rear-engined car
1962	Merlyn MK 4	Group 4	Also a road version produced
1963	Merlyn MK 5	Formula Junior	
1964	Merlyn MK 6	Group 7	
1964	Merlyn MK 7	Formula 2	
1964	Merlyn MK 7	Formula 3	
1965	Merlyn MK 8	Group 7	V8 engined sports car
1965	Merlyn MK 9	Formula 2	
1965	Merlyn MK 9	Formula 3	
1967	Merlyn MK 10	Formula 3	
1967	Merlyn MK 10	Formula Libre	
1968	Merlyn MK 11	Formula Ford	
1968	Merlyn MK 12	Formula 2	Powered by Ford-Cosworth FVA engine
1968	Merlyn MK 14	Formula 3	
1969	Merlyn MK 15	Formula B	Formula B version of the MK 12
1970	Merlyn MK 16	Formula F100	
1970	Merlyn MK 17	Formula Ford	Intermediary model between the MK 11A and the MK 20
1970	Merlyn MK 19	Grand tourer	Prototype only
1971	Merlyn MK 20	Formula Ford	
1971	Merlyn MK 21	Formula 3	
1971	Merlyn MK 21	Formula B	
1972	Merlyn MK 22	Midget	Car made for midget racing in the U.S.A.
1973	Merlyn MK 24	Formula Ford	
1974	Merlyn MK 25	Formula Ford	
1974	Merlyn MK 26	U2L Can–Am	
1975	Merlyn MK 27	Formula 3	Never made
1975	Merlyn MK 26	Formula Ford 2000	
1975	Merlyn MK 27	Formula Ford	
1975	Merlyn MK 29	Formula Ford	
1977	Merlyn MK 30	Formula Ford	
1978	Merlyn MK 31	Formula Ford	
