= Ferrari 312T =

1975-1980 Formula One racing car by Ferrari

Ferrari 312T Ferrari 312T2 Ferrari 312T2B Ferrari 312T3 Ferrari 312T4 Ferrari 312T5
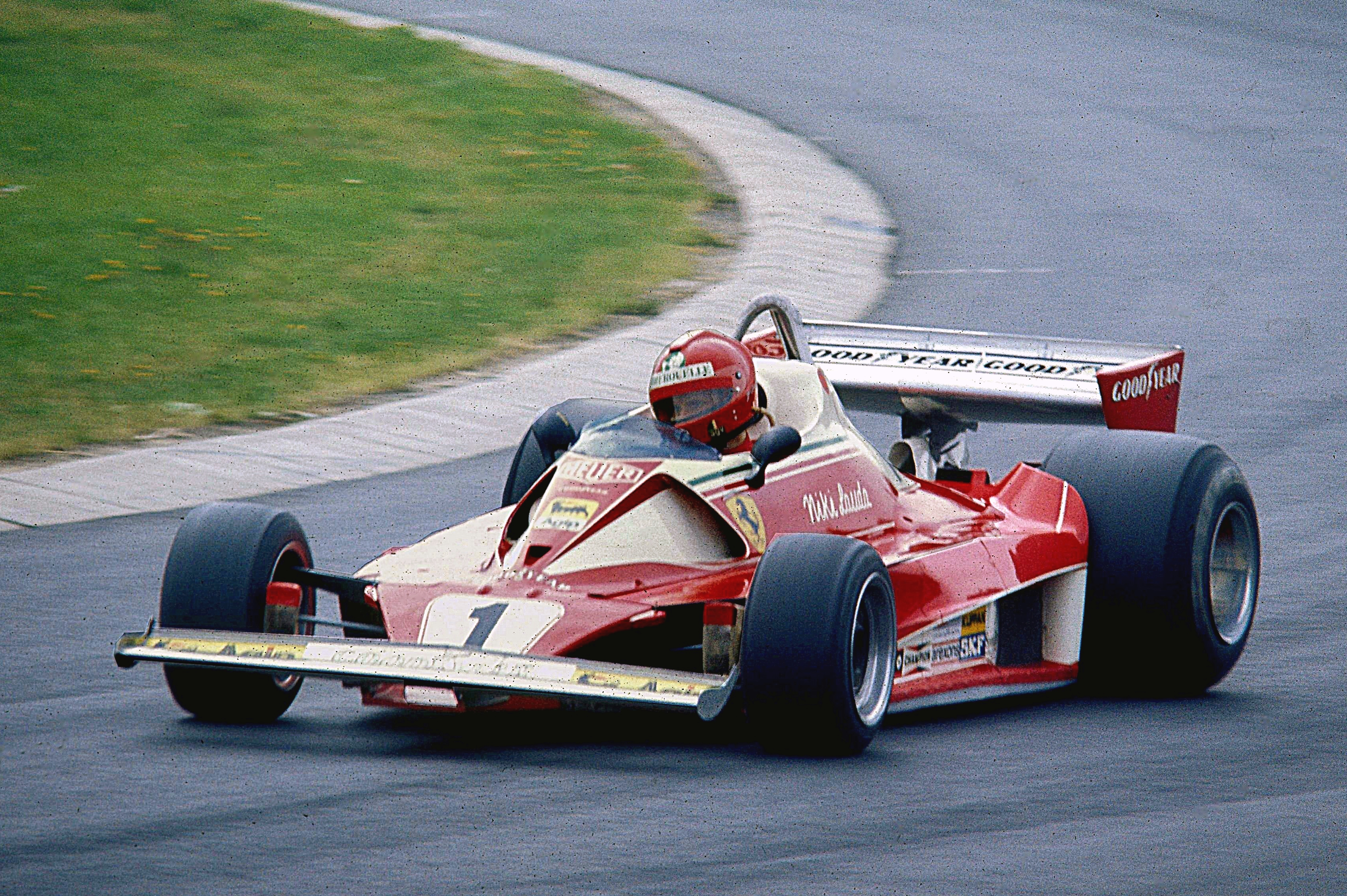
- Niki Lauda in a 312 T2
- Category: Formula One
- Constructor: Scuderia Ferrari
- Designer: Mauro Forghieri
- Predecessor: 312B3
- Successor: 126C

Technical specifications
- Chassis: Steel tube frame with aluminium shear panels
- Suspension (front): Double wishbone, inboard spring/damper
- Suspension (rear): Double wishbone suspension
- Engine: Ferrari Tipo 015, 2,992 cc (182.6 cu in), flat 12, naturally aspirated, mid-engine, longitudinally-mounted
- Transmission: Ferrari Type 015 5-speed transverse gearbox manual
- Power: 500–515 hp (372.8–384.0 kW) @ 12,500 rpm 236 lb⋅ft (320.0 N⋅m)
- Fuel: Agip
- Tyres: 1975-77: Goodyear; 1978-80: Michelin

Competition history
- Notable entrants: Scuderia Ferrari
- Notable drivers: (Austria) Niki Lauda (Switzerland) Clay Regazzoni (Argentina) Carlos Reutemann (South Africa) Jody Scheckter (Canada) Gilles Villeneuve
- Debut: 1975 South African Grand Prix (312T); 1976 Spanish Grand Prix (312T2); 1978 South African Grand Prix (312T3); 1979 South African Grand Prix (312T4); 1980 Argentine Grand Prix (312T5)
Races	Wins	Podiums	Poles	F/Laps
89	27	61	19	25
- Constructors' Championships: 4 (1975, 1976, 1977, 1979)
- Drivers' Championships: 3 (Niki Lauda – 1975, 1977, Jody Scheckter – 1979)
- Unless otherwise stated, all data refer to Formula One World Championship Grands Prix only.

The Ferrari 312T was a Ferrari Formula One car design, based on the 312B3 from 1974. In various versions, it was used from 1975 until 1980. It was designed by Mauro Forghieri for the 1975 season, and was an uncomplicated and clean design that responded well to mechanical upgrades.

The 312T series won 27 races, four Constructors' and three Drivers' Championships, making it the most successful car design in Formula One history. It was replaced for the 1981 season by the 126 C, Ferrari's first turbocharged F1 car. It was also Ferrari's last naturally-aspirated F1 car until the Ferrari 640 in 1989, after the ban on turbocharged engines.

== Mechanical configuration ==
The car was powered by the powerful and reliable Tipo 015 flat-12 engine which gave around 510 bhp. Although it had to carry more fuel, oil and water than the Cosworth DFV-powered cars the power-to-weight ratio of the flat-12 was about the same as the DFV. The "3" stood for the car's engine displacement (3 litres) and "12" was the number of cylinders it had (12).

In order to improve upon the preceding 312B3, Forghieri designed a new chassis for the 312T. The 312T chassis was a semi-monocoque consisting of tubular spaceframe reinforced with riveted aluminium panels. This "traditional" construction was a departure from the full monocoque of the 312B3. The new chassis was slightly heavier than the 312B3 monocoque, but had comparable rigidity and was easier to adjust and repair. It could also accept bodywork with a lower frontal area, reducing drag. The suspension design was substantially revised to work with the new chassis. The same basic chassis design and construction method was used in all 312T-series cars, although later cars received modifications to improve torsional rigidity.

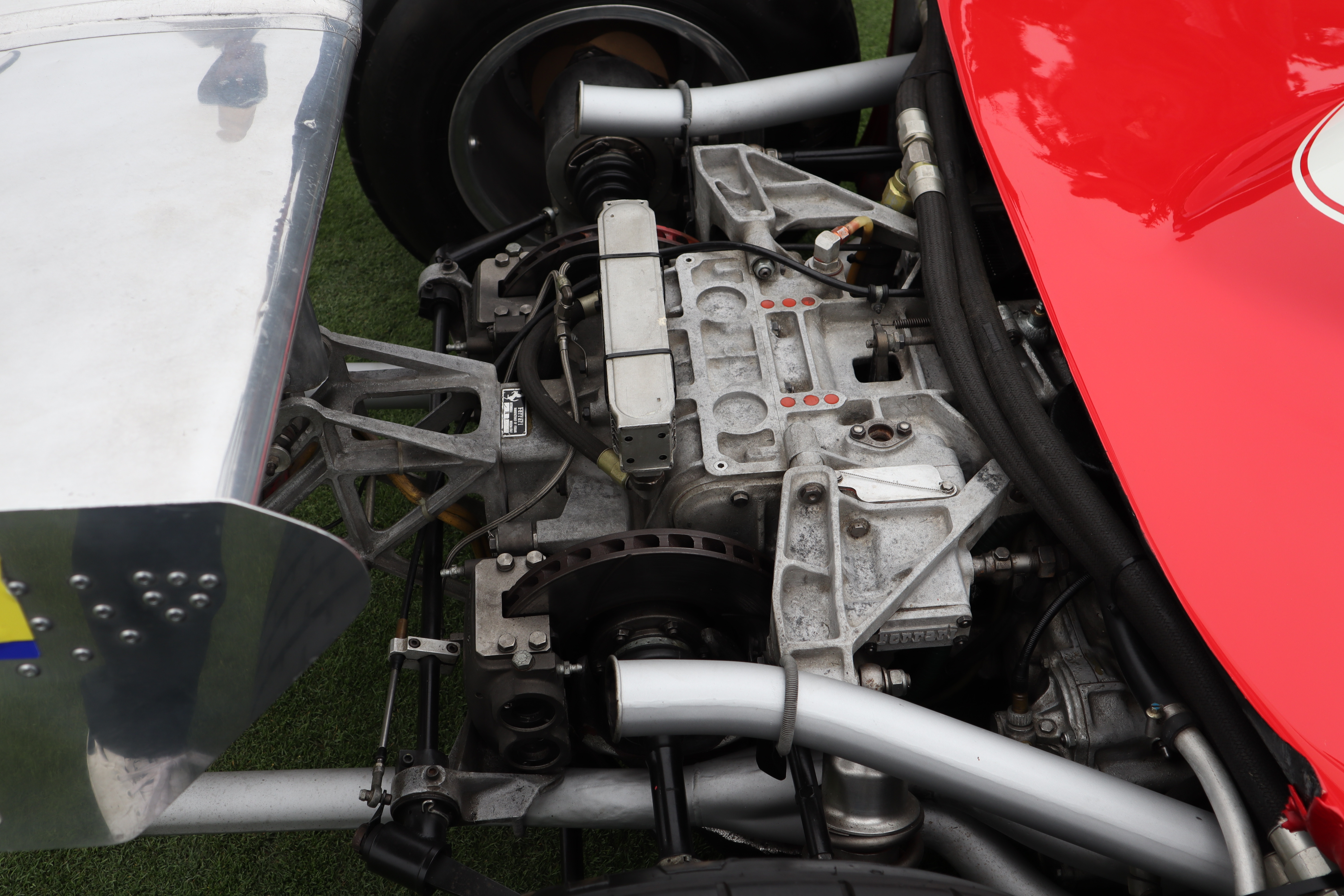
The transverse gearbox of a Ferrari 312T3

Forgheri and Ferrari engineer Walter Salvarani also developed a new gearbox for the 312T. This unit was mounted behind the engine in a transverse orientation, ahead of the rear wheels. This moved the car's center of mass forward and lowered the polar moment of inertia. This design had precedent in the March 721X. This gearbox configuration was considered so important to the overall design that the "T" in the 312T name stood for trasversale, Italian for transverse. While all 312T gearboxes used in competition were conventional manual transmissions, Ferrari briefly experimented with a semi-automatic version of the gearbox in 1979. This consisted of a modified version of the manual gearbox actuated by a high-pressure hydraulic system, controlled by buttons mounted on the steering wheel. The system was intended to speed up gear changes and reduce human error. It was tested by Scuderia Ferrari driver Gilles Villeneuve at Fiorano, but was not used in competition as Villeneuve preferred the original manual transmission. Ferrari would revisit the semi-automatic gearbox 10 years later, in the 1989 Ferrari 640 F1 car.

== Versions ==
=== 312T ===
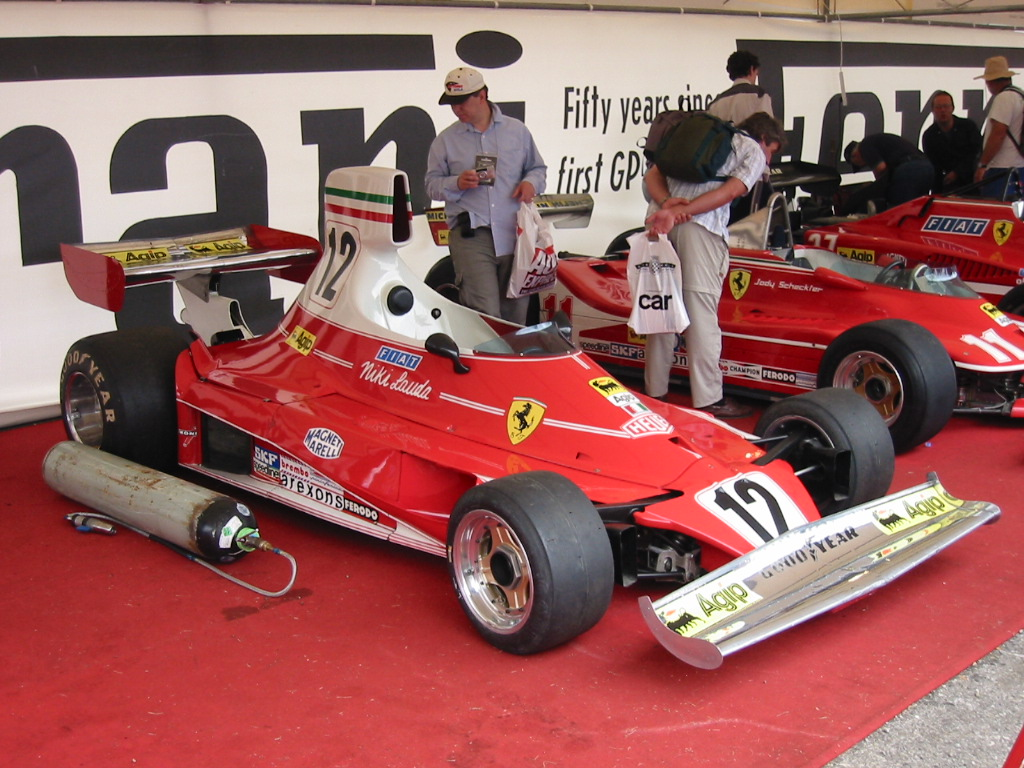
Niki Lauda's 1975 312T on display.

The development of the 312T began in 1974, as it became apparent that problems with the handling of the then current 312B3 chassis could not be solved, and a radical re-think was required. As with all Ferrari F1 cars of this era, the design of the new model was led by Mauro Forghieri – the capable Italian engineer designed an all-new chassis and bodywork, and redesigned both the engine and the gearbox.

The car was constructed with aluminium panels over a tubular steel spaceframe, as was typical in F1 at the time, but featured a large number of new design features, the most interesting of which was the transverse-mounted gearbox – the T in the car's name stood for Trasversale. The gearbox design allowed it to be positioned ahead of the rear axle, in order to give a low polar moment of inertia. The suspension was also significantly different from that of the 312B3, and the front of the chassis was much narrower. The handling of the car was found to be inherently neutral, not suffering from the persistent understeer which blighted the 312B3. Niki Lauda tested the car extensively during the off season, ready for a full-on championship challenge.

The first 312T was completed in the autumn of 1974, and unveiled to the press in Modena after the end of the 1974 season. However, the team used the old 312B3 at the first two races of the 1975 season, and it was not until the South African Grand Prix the 312T received its race debut. The car's performance at its debut race was disappointing, with Clay Regazzoni's car being set up incorrectly, and Niki Lauda's suffering from a lack of power. A subsequent test of Lauda's engine proved that there was a technical problem.

The 312T was tested alongside the 312B3 at Fiorano, proving conclusively that the newer car was faster, and indeed it went on to win its next race, the non-championship International Trophy race, with Lauda at the wheel. In the world championship, after the slow start to the season in which Brabham, Tyrrell and McLaren put up strong competition, Lauda won 4 out of 5 races mid season before snatching the title at Monza by finishing third, whilst Clay Regazzoni's win in that race secured Ferrari its first Constructors' Championship since 1964. Lauda went on to win the US Grand Prix at season's end, confirming Ferrari's superiority in 1975.

The Formula 1 technical regulations were changed for the 1976 season – from the Spanish Grand Prix in May, the tall air boxes which had become popular would be banned. The rules therefore allowed Ferrari to continue to use the 312T for the opening 3 races of the 1976 season (Lauda won the first two and Regazzoni the third), before the introduction of its successor, a revised version called the 312T2.

Five 312T chassis were used in races (chassis numbers: 018,021,022,023,024). The car's final world championship race was at the 1976 United States Grand Prix West.

=== 312T2 ===
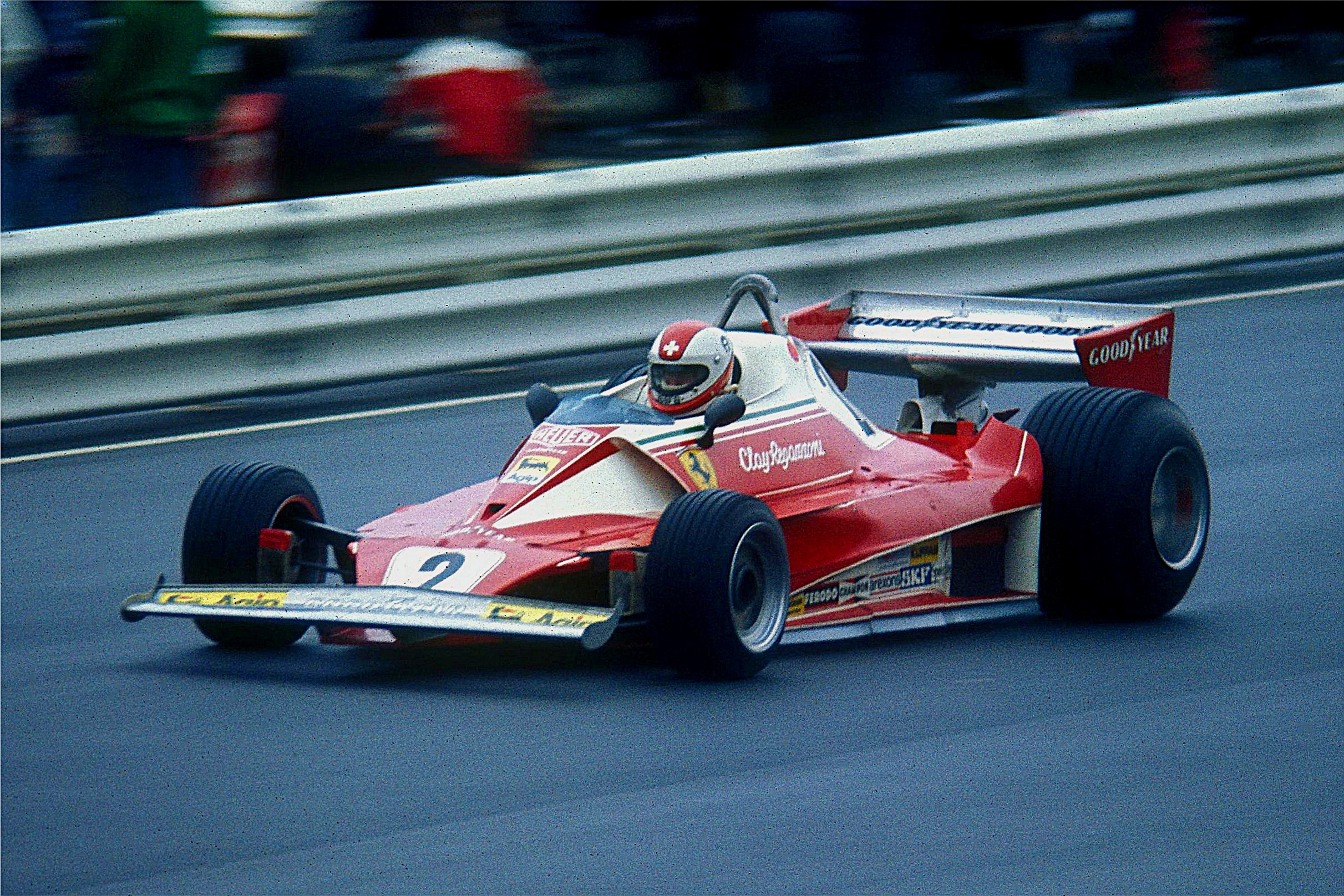
Clay Regazzoni (1939–2006) in a 312T2 in 1976 at the Nürburgring

The 312T2 was launched at Fiorano and featured a number of modifications over the 312T. In order to comply with the revised aerodynamic rules, the car no longer featured an airbox behind the cockpit. Instead "NACA shaped" air intakes were incorporated into the cockpit sides, feeding air into each cylinder bank of the flat 12 engine. At 2560mm, the wheelbase was 42mm longer than that of the 312T. At the time of launch, the car also featured some notable mechanical modifications, including a de Dion rear suspension arrangement, although this was abandoned after extensive testing, in favour of a more conventional suspension set up.

The 312T2 was given its race debut at the non-championship Brands Hatch Race of Champions in March 1976 and was first used in a world championship race in May at the Spanish Grand Prix. The 312T2 was, if anything, more successful than the 312T. Lauda was comfortably leading the world championship after another 3 wins, when at the 1976 German Grand Prix at Nürburgring he had a massive accident caused by a suspected rear suspension failure. In the aftermath he nearly burned to death, but was miraculously back to racing just 6 weeks later. Lauda conceded the title by just a single point to James Hunt, but the 312T2's superiority helped Ferrari win its second consecutive constructors' title.

==== 312T2B ====
The 312T2 was uprated to B-spec. for the 1977 season. At the early races the cars were little different from the 1976 specification cars, indeed two of the 1976 cars (chassis 026 and 027) were used in the early races. One of the few visible changes was the addition of Fiat logos to a Ferrari F1 car for the first time. Lauda was unhappy with the performance of the car at the first two races of 1977, and led an extensive test programme to develop the car in the weeks between the Brazilian and South African grands prix. These tests resulted in the introduction of several changes to the car, including a new rear wing, revised bodywork and suspension. Lauda went on to win the South African race, albeit in tragic circumstances, his car heavily damaged by debris from Tom Pryce's fatal accident.

Over the course of the season, three new cars were constructed (chassis numbers 029, 030 & 031) and the car's development continued. Several different noses and rear wing profiles were used, some especially tailored for specific circuits, and numerous changes were made to the suspension and rear bodywork. One of the problems Ferrari had with the 312T2B in 1977 was that the Goodyear tyres were increasingly unsuited to the car. As Goodyear continued to develop the tyres to cope with the high downforce of the Lotus 78, it became more difficult for the Ferrari (with less downforce) to build up sufficient tyre temperatures. Although still quick, the B-spec car proved to be more difficult to drive than the previous year's iteration of the car largely due to the insufficient tyre temperatures and the various wing profiles Forghieri and his team were using, some of which didn't work properly. In one example, Lauda retired from the Swedish Grand Prix because of the car's handling difficulties.

However, despite its problems, the 312T2B was good enough to win the Drivers' Championship for Lauda, who won more through the car's reliability than outright speed. He took 3 wins, while Reutemann won once. The Constructors' Championship was also secured for a third successive season before Lauda walked out on the team before season's end after he won the championship at Watkins Glen in America. He was replaced by Canadian Gilles Villeneuve, who was unable to get a handle on the T2B, as its neutral handling did not suit his oversteering driving style. Ferrari were due to run 3 cars at Mosport Park in Canada but Lauda decided to depart early because he felt Ferrari could not run 3 cars at a race without its resources being stretched. Then at the last race at the Mount Fuji circuit in Japan, Villeneuve had an enormous accident where he was launched over Ronnie Peterson's 6-wheel Tyrrell at the end of the straight, cleared the Armco barrier and landed in a spectator-restricted area. 2 spectators who were standing in this restricted area were crushed and killed instantly by the airborne Ferrari.

The 312T2B was used for the first two races of 1978, before being replaced by the 312T3.

=== 312T3 ===
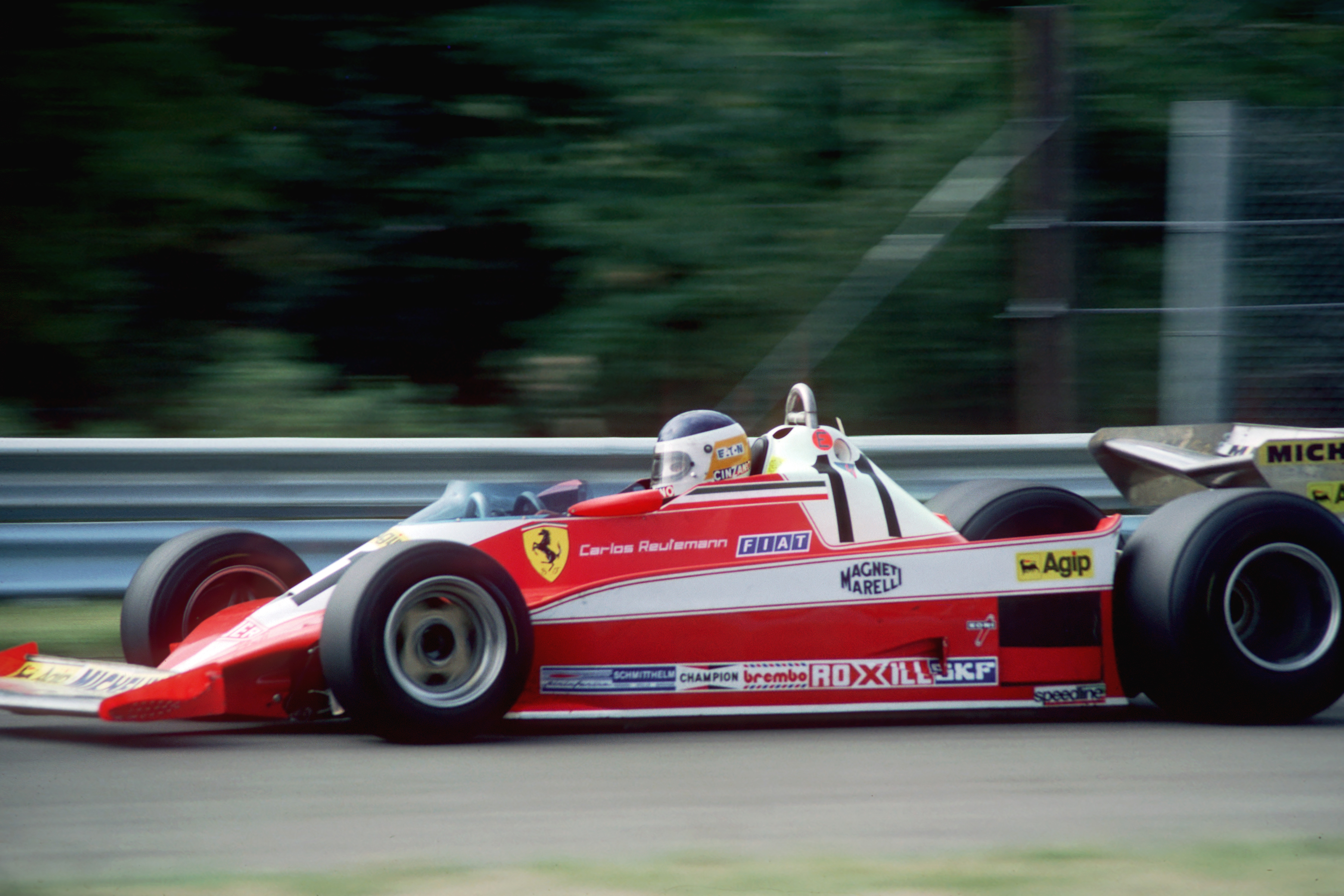
Ferrari 312T3 driven by Carlos Reutemann (1942–2021) in 1978 USA Grand Prix at Watkins Glen, New York

The 312T3 was introduced for Villeneuve and Reutemann at the third race of the 1978 season.

The car featured the same flat 12 engine as had been used since 1970, albeit tuned to give around 515 bhp. The chassis was completely new, with a new monocoque structure and a different suspension arrangement, designed to work with the Michelin tyres. The bodywork visibly very different, with a flatter top to the body, allowing improved air flow to the rear wing.

All the hard work came to nothing though as the pioneering Lotus 79 ground effect "wing car" took on and beat all comers with ease that season, and Ferrari were left to pick up the pieces of any Lotus failures. Reutemann won 4 races, whilst Villeneuve won for the first time at the final race, his home race in Canada, but it was more a season of consolidation. Reutemann moved to Lotus for 1979, replaced by Jody Scheckter. Ferrari was 2nd in the Constructors' Championship.

=== 312T4 ===
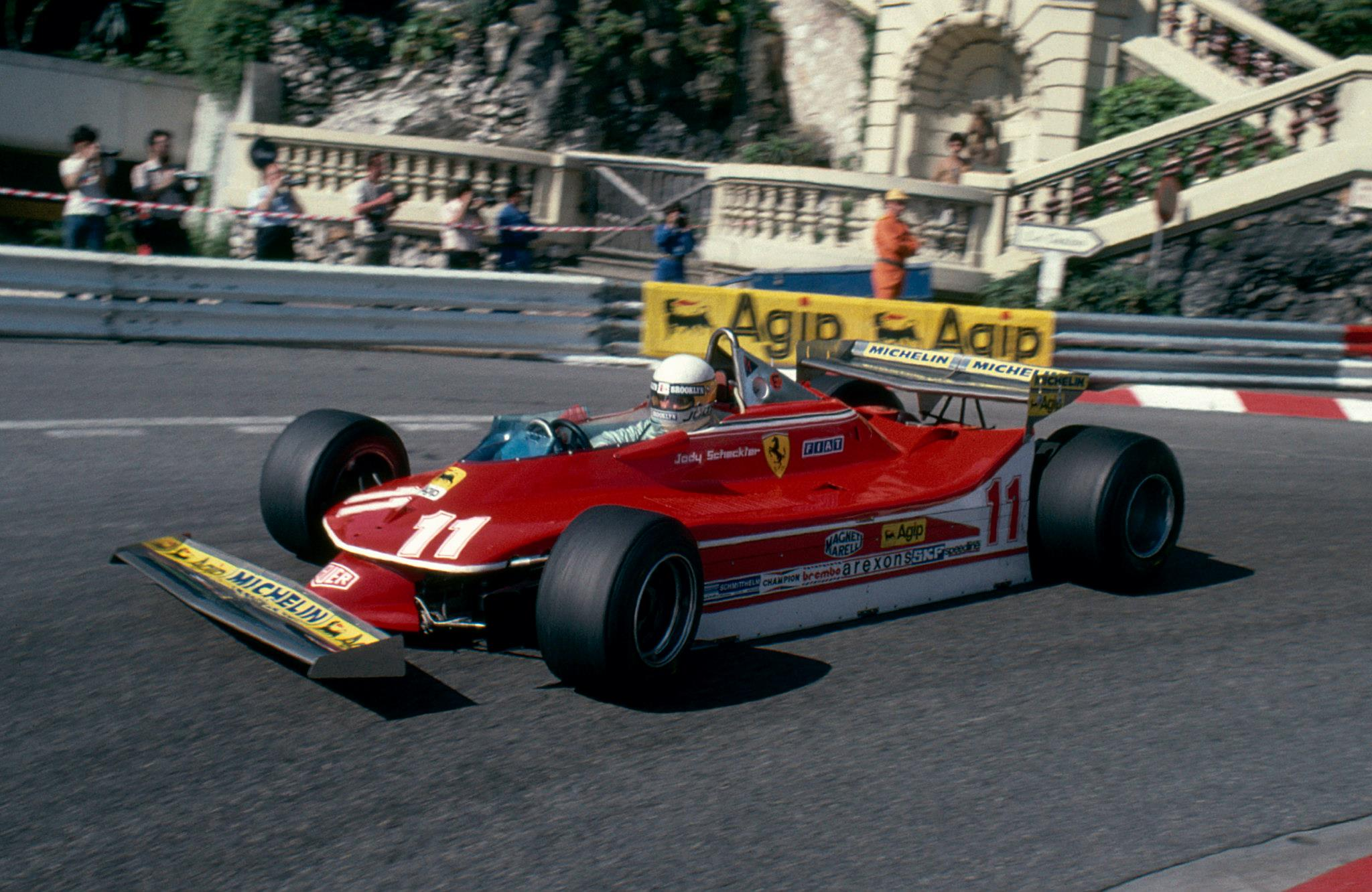
Jody Scheckter driving the 312T4 at the 1979 Monaco Grand Prix, where he took his second win of the season.

In 1979, a significant amount of progress was made in aerodynamics and to challenge Lotus, Forghieri realised he had to follow their lead and design a ground effect car for 1979. The 312T4, introduced at the 1979 South African Grand Prix was closely based on the 312T3. Its origins placed restrictions on the aerodynamic design since the T series had never been designed with ground effect in mind. The 312T4 monocoque was designed to be as narrow as possible, to take advantage of ground effects, but this was limited by the width of the flat 12 engine, which partially sat in the area where the upswept underside should have been, therefore the 312T4 was more of a wing car similar to the Lotus 78.

The car was extremely reliable, recording only one retirement for mechanical reasons and it won 6 races in 1979, three each for Villeneuve and Scheckter. Other solid placings helped Ferrari win its fourth Constructors' Championship in 5 seasons and Scheckter his only Drivers' Championship.

Scheckter was given the 312T4 car he drove to his championship after the new 312T5 was ready to be debuted in Argentina in 1980. He ran it at the 2010 Bahrain Grand Prix weekend to celebrate the 60th anniversary of Formula One, along with every living Formula One world champion except for Nelson Piquet and Kimi Räikkönen, and again at the 2019 Italian Grand Prix to commemorate the fortieth anniversary of his title triumph there, and then sold it at auction in 2024.

=== 312T5 ===
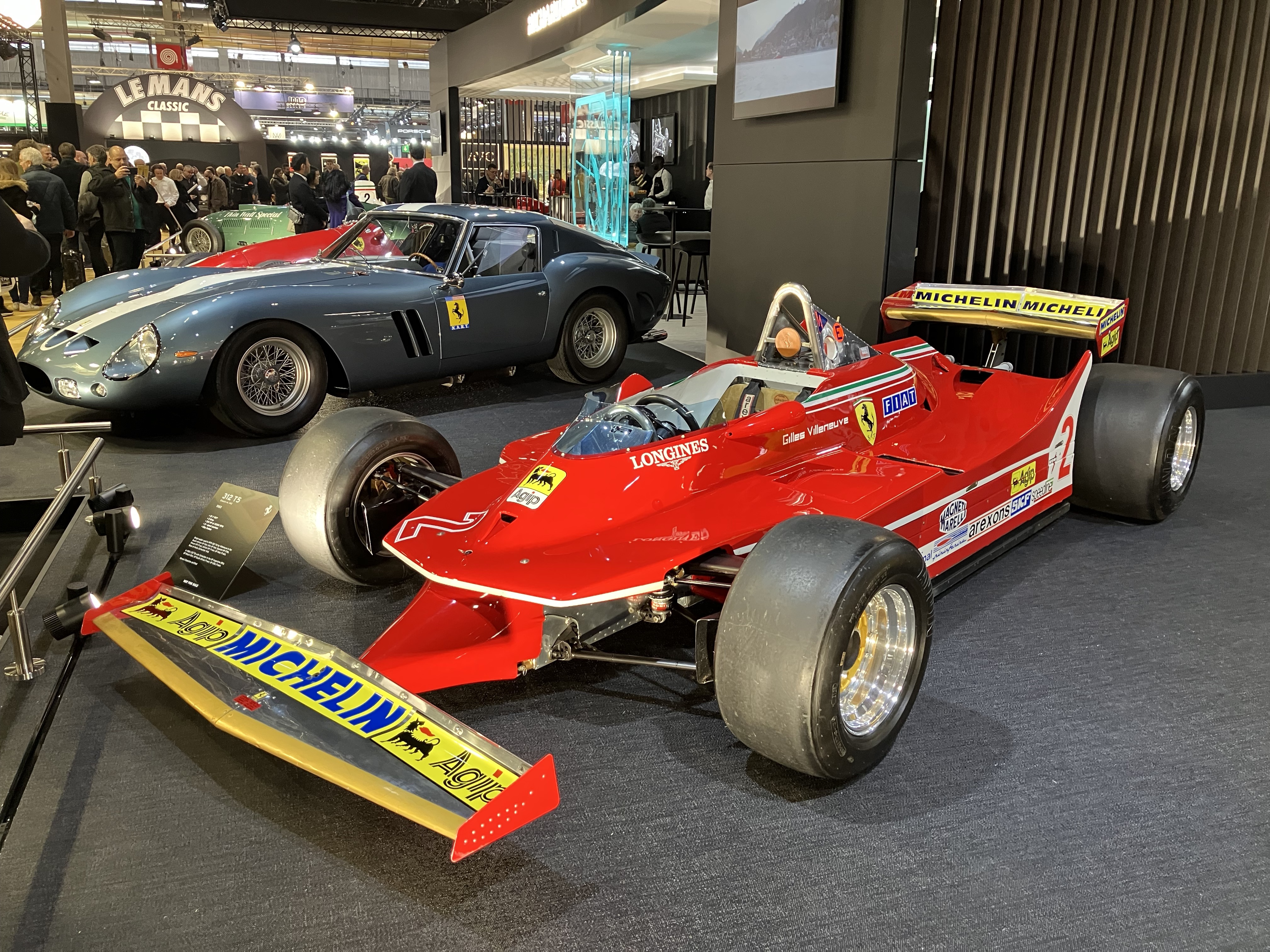
Gilles Villeneuve's 312T5.

The 1980 season saw further aerodynamic progress by Cosworth DFV teams, and a heavily updated version of the 312T4, the 312T5 was introduced at the start of the season. The Ferrari was totally outclassed as their wide 312 "Boxer" engine did not suit the aerodynamic needs. The car was unreliable, slow, and ineffective against the competition. The other constructors' cars got better throughout the season whereas the 312T5's development went virtually nowhere – the car became less and less competitive over the season. For the first time since 1973, Ferrari did not win a race for an entire season, and the team finished 10th in the Constructors' Championship. Scheckter even failed to qualify in Canada and, after only managing 2 points, retired from the sport at the end of the year. The 312T5's best qualifying result came courtesy of Villeneuve being the third fastest qualifier for the Brazilian Grand Prix. The 312T5's best results were three fifth-place finishes, one for Scheckter at Long Beach and the two others for Villeneuve at Monaco and also at his home race in Canada.

The 312T5 was succeeded by a completely new car, the 126CK, for the 1981 season.

=== 312T6 ===
The six-wheeled 312T6 used four tyres at the rear, specially developed for the purpose. It was one of a few six-wheeled designs during that period, although Tyrrell's P34 was the only example which raced. The car followed in the footsteps of the Tyrrell P34, but instead of four smaller front wheels, the T6 used 4 normal sized rear wheels on one rear axle.

The car was tested by both Niki Lauda and Carlos Reutemann in 1977, but it never raced. Quite apart from the fact that it was far wider than the regulations permitted it also proved a challenge to drive. During one test session at Ferrari's Fiorano test track, Carlos Reutemann, on the 12th lap, crashed the car, which then burst into flames. On another occasion, it suffered a rear upright failure. Reutemann was not impressed with the 312T6.

=== 312T8 ===
Following the 312T6 experiment articles appeared in the Italian press with pictures and illustrations depicting a secret eight-wheeled Ferrari Formula 1 car, dubbed the 312T8. They showed four wheels at the front, like the Tyrrell P34, and another four at the rear, like the March 2-4-0. The idea was evidently crazy and no such car ever materialised. Many years later, these pictures were revealed to be a mock up, released by Ferrari itself (although not officially) to keep attention high.

== Technical data ==
Technical data	312T	312T2	312T3	312T4	312T5
Engine:	Mid-mounted 12-cylinder flat-engine
displacement:	2992 cm^{3}
Bore x stroke:	80.0 x 49.6 mm
Compression:	11.5:1
Max power at rpm:	495 hp at 12 200 rpm	500 hp at 12 200 rpm	510 hp at 12 200 rpm	515 hp at 12 300 rpm
Valve control:	Double Overhead Camshafts per cylinder bank, 4 valves per cylinder
Fuel system:	Lucas fuel injection
Gearbox:	5-speed manual				6-speed manual
suspension front:	Double wishbones, coil springs, anti-roll bars
suspension rear:	Upper transverse link, lower triangular link, double longitudinal links, coil springs, anti-roll bars		Double triangle links, coil springs, anti-roll bars
Brakes:	Hydraulic disc brakes
Chassis & body:	Self-supporting monocoque
Wheelbase:	252 cm	256 cm		270 cm
Dry weight:	575 kg	560 kg	580 kg	590 kg	595 kg

== Complete Formula One World Championship results ==
Year	Chassis	Tyres	Driver	1	2	3	4	5	6	7	8	9	10	11	12	13	14	15	16	17	Points	WCC
1975	312T	G		ARG	BRA	RSA	ESP	MON	BEL	SWE	NED	FRA	GBR	GER	AUT	ITA	USA				72.5^{1}	1st
1975	312T	G	Clay Regazzoni			16	NC	Ret	5	3	3	Ret	13	Ret	7	1	Ret				72.5^{1}	1st
1975	312T	G	Niki Lauda			5	Ret	1	1	1	2	1	8	3	6	3	1				72.5^{1}	1st
1976	312T	G		BRA	RSA	USW	ESP	BEL	MON	SWE	FRA	GBR	GER	AUT	NED	ITA	CAN	USA	JPN		83	1st
1976	312T	G	Niki Lauda	1	1	2															83	1st
1976	312T	G	Clay Regazzoni	7	Ret	1															83	1st
1976	312T2	G	Niki Lauda				2	1	1	3	Ret	1	Ret			4	8	3	Ret		83	1st
1976	312T2	G	Clay Regazzoni				11	2	14†	6	Ret	DSQ	9		2	2	6	7	5		83	1st
1976	312T2	G	Carlos Reutemann													9					83	1st
1977	312T2B	G		ARG	BRA	RSA	USW	ESP	MON	BEL	SWE	FRA	GBR	GER	AUT	NED	ITA	USA	CAN	JPN	95 (97)	1st
1977	312T2B	G	Niki Lauda	Ret	3	1	2	DNS	2	2	Ret	5	2	1	2	1	2	4			95 (97)	1st
1977	312T2B	G	Carlos Reutemann	3	1	8	Ret	2	3	Ret	3	6	15	4	4	6	Ret	6	Ret	2	95 (97)	1st
1977	312T2B	G	Gilles Villeneuve																12	Ret	95 (97)	1st
1978	312T2B	MI		ARG	BRA	RSA	USW	MON	BEL	ESP	SWE	FRA	GBR	GER	AUT	NED	ITA	USA	CAN		58	2nd
1978	312T2B	MI	Carlos Reutemann	7	1																58	2nd
1978	312T2B	MI	Gilles Villeneuve	8	Ret																58	2nd
1978	312T3	MI	Carlos Reutemann			Ret	1	8	3	Ret	10	18	1	Ret	DSQ	7	3	1	3		58	2nd
1978	312T3	MI	Gilles Villeneuve			Ret	Ret	Ret	4	10	9	12	Ret	8	3	6	7	Ret	1		58	2nd
1979	312T3	MI		ARG	BRA	RSA	USW	ESP	BEL	MON	FRA	GBR	GER	AUT	NED	ITA	CAN	USA			113	1st
1979	312T3	MI	Jody Scheckter	Ret	6																113	1st
1979	312T3	MI	Gilles Villeneuve	Ret	5																113	1st
1979	312T4	MI	Jody Scheckter			2	2	4	1	1	7	5	4	4	2	1	4	Ret			113	1st
1979	312T4	MI	Gilles Villeneuve			1	1	7	7	Ret	2	14†	8	2	Ret	2	2	1			113	1st
1980	312T5	MI		ARG	BRA	RSA	USW	BEL	MON	FRA	GBR	GER	AUT	NED	ITA	CAN	USA				8	10th
1980	312T5	MI	Jody Scheckter	Ret	Ret	Ret	5	8	Ret	12	10	13	13	9	8	DNQ	11				8	10th
1980	312T5	MI	Gilles Villeneuve	Ret	16†	Ret	Ret	6	5	8	Ret	6	8	7	Ret	5	Ret				8	10th

^1 In 1975, nine points were scored driving the Ferrari 312B3.
† - Driver retired from the race, but was classified as he had completed more than 90% of the race distance.
