= Kurt DelBene =

American technology official (born 1960)

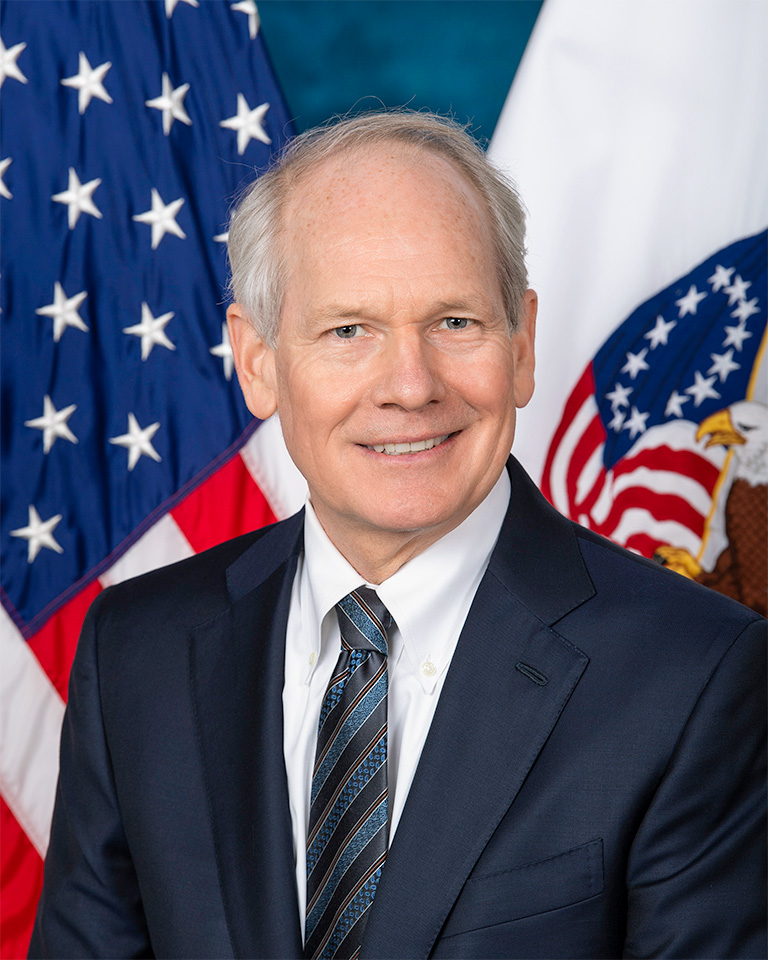
- Kurt DelBene in 2022
- Born: 1960 (age 65–66)
- Education: University of Arizona (BS); Stanford University (MS); University of Chicago (MBA)
- Occupations: Assistant Secretary of Veterans Affairs for Information and Technology
- Spouse: Suzan DelBene (m. 1997)
- Children: 2

Kurt D. DelBene (born 1960) is an American business executive who served as the assistant secretary for information and technology and CIO at the Department of Veterans Affairs. Before taking this role, he was an executive vice president at Microsoft. DelBene has also previously served as senior advisor to the United States Secretary of Health and Human Services, appointed by President Obama to oversee the implementation and improvement of the Affordable Care Act, HealthCare.gov. Prior to that, he served in several leadership roles at Microsoft, including president of the Microsoft Office division from 2010–2013.

== Education ==
DelBene received a Bachelor of Science degree in industrial engineering from the University of Arizona. DelBene subsequently earned a Master of Science in operations research from Stanford University and a Master of Business Administration from the University of Chicago.

== Career ==
DelBene's worked at AT&T Bell Laboratories as a software developer and systems engineer and as a management consultant for McKinsey & Co. prior to joining Microsoft.

=== Microsoft ===
DelBene worked in product development, before becoming President of the Microsoft Office business in 2010. Specifically, he served as the marketing and engineering leader for Office, Office 365, Exchange, Project, SharePoint, Visio and Lync. While overseeing Office, DelBene reported directly to former Microsoft Chief Executive Officer Steve Ballmer, oversaw the launch and expansion of Office 365 and was credited with leading the Microsoft shift to the cloud. During his tenure, Office revenue grew from less than $5 billion to more than $22 billion. As part of a reorganization in July 2013, Microsoft announced that DelBene would be retiring. He continued with Microsoft as an adviser until mid-December.

=== HealthCare.gov ===
On December 17, 2013, the White House announced that DelBene would undertake a sixth-month effort to salvage the government's health insurance website, HealthCare.gov. In a statement, Kathleen Sebelius, Secretary of the U.S. Department of Health and Human Services, said that she and President Obama chose DelBene to assist with this effort because of his experience working at Microsoft and his ability to manage and execute large scale technology projects. DelBene was responsible for improving the security, capacity, and reliability of the website that had been plagued with slow response times, crashes, and incorrectly transmitting users' information to insurers. At the end of his time in government, DelBene was credited with helping to stabilize the website. DelBene donated his salary back to the government.

=== Madrona Venture Partners ===
In September 2014, DelBene joined Seattle-based venture capital firm Madrona Venture Group as a venture partner. He was responsible for identifying new investment opportunities and providing strategic guidance to companies in Madrona's portfolio.

=== Return to Microsoft ===
In April 2015, Microsoft announced DelBene would return to Microsoft as EVP of corporate strategy and planning, where he would join the company's senior leadership team, reporting directly to CEO Satya Nadella. DelBene was responsible for future investment opportunities. DelBene led the acquisition and integration of LinkedIn, Microsoft's biggest acquisition to date. In July 2017, DelBene received expanded responsibility and was given the title of chief digital officer and EVP of corporate strategy, core services engineering and operations. In that role, he continued to oversee strategy but also the company's internal Core Services Engineering and Operations groups. In January 2021, DelBene announced he would be retiring from Microsoft at the end of June, to pursue personal passions and board work.

=== Assistant Secretary of Veterans Affairs ===
In November 2021, President Joe Biden announced DelBene as the nominee for assistant secretary for information and technology and CIO at the Department of Veterans Affairs. The nomination was formally submitted on November 19, 2021 and referred to the Senate Committee on Veterans' Affairs, who held a hearing on December 15, 2021, and reported the nomination favorably to the Senate on the same day. The Senate confirmed the nomination by voice vote on December 16, 2021, and DelBene began work in January 2022. He left the position in January of 2025.

=== Boards ===
DelBene sits on the board of trustees of Reed College. He is on the board of directors for Partners in Health, and Global Partnerships, an organization that makes capital investments in projects across 18 countries to improve things such as access to electricity and basic healthcare for those living in poverty. DelBene is also on the advisory board of the University of Washington, Bothell.

== Personal life ==
DelBene is married to Suzan DelBene, a former Microsoft employee who is now a United States Congresswoman representing Washington's 1st congressional district. The couple have two children.

He is an avid racer of British vintage cars, which he restores himself out of his garage in the Puget Sound region. DelBene owns a Formula One car.
