= Brabham BT14 =

Racing car

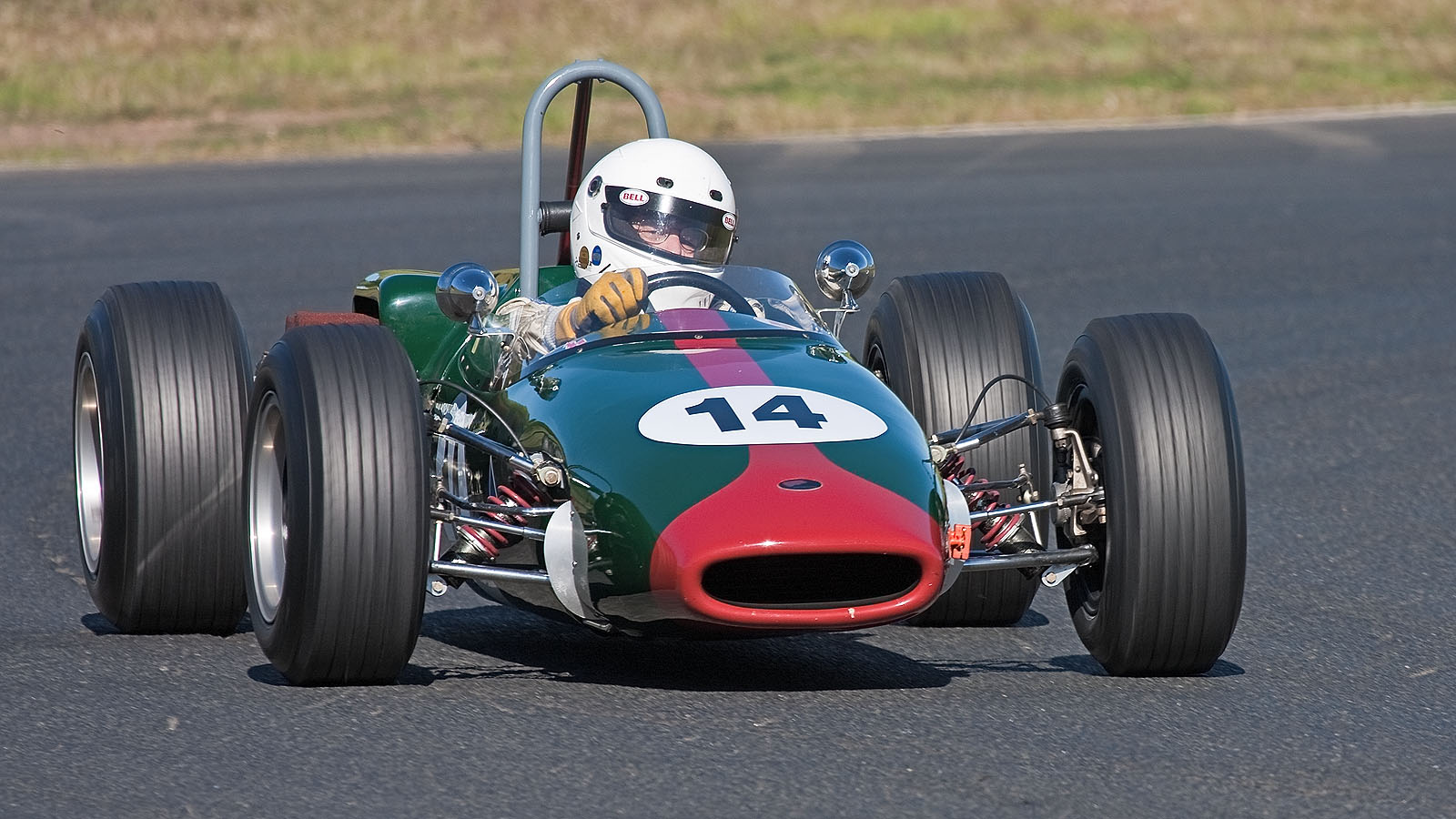
Brabham BT14

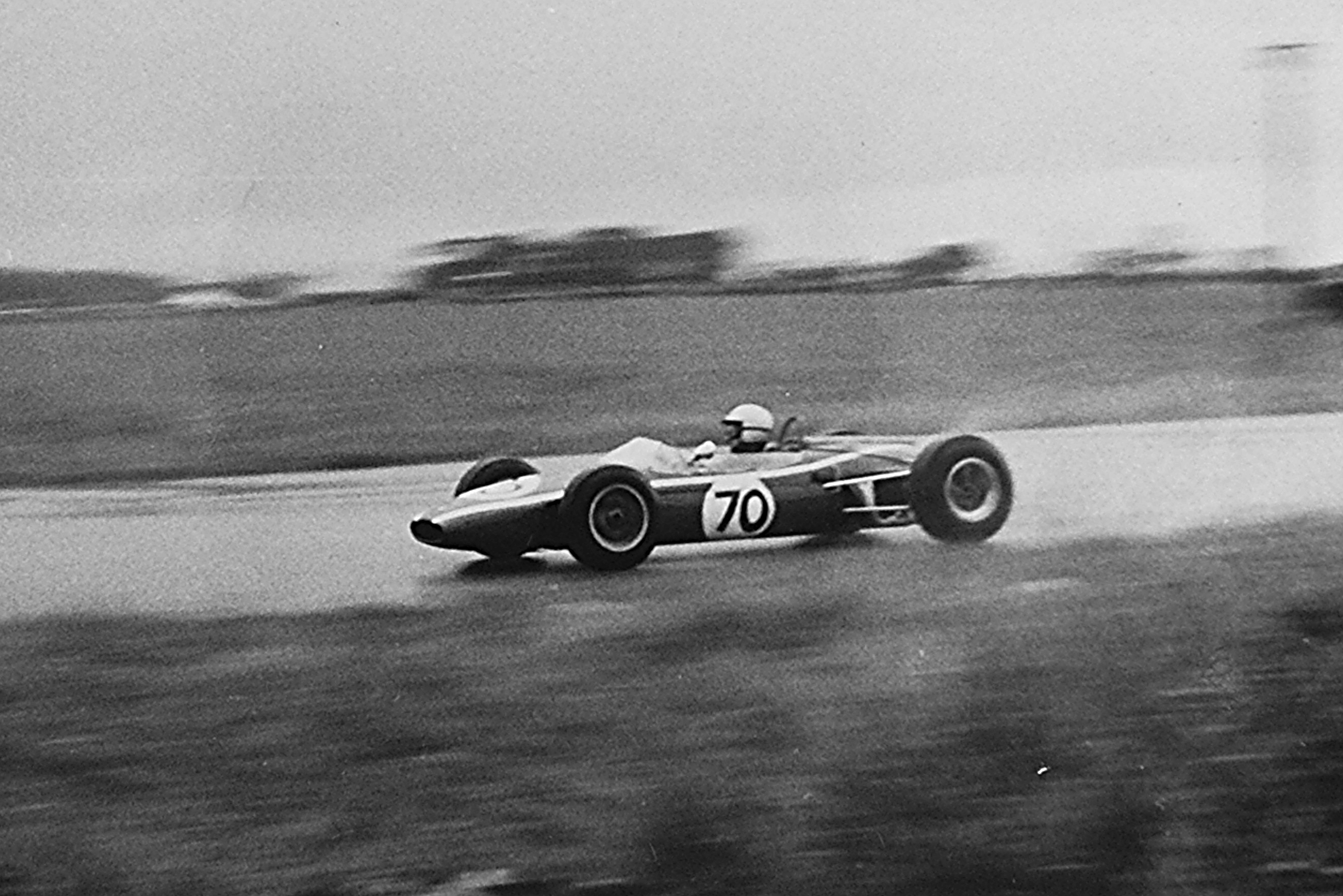
D. Powell's 1500cc Brabham BT14 in the Echo Trophy at the Llandow Circuit, South Wales, August 1966. Scanned print taken with a Halina 35X Super.

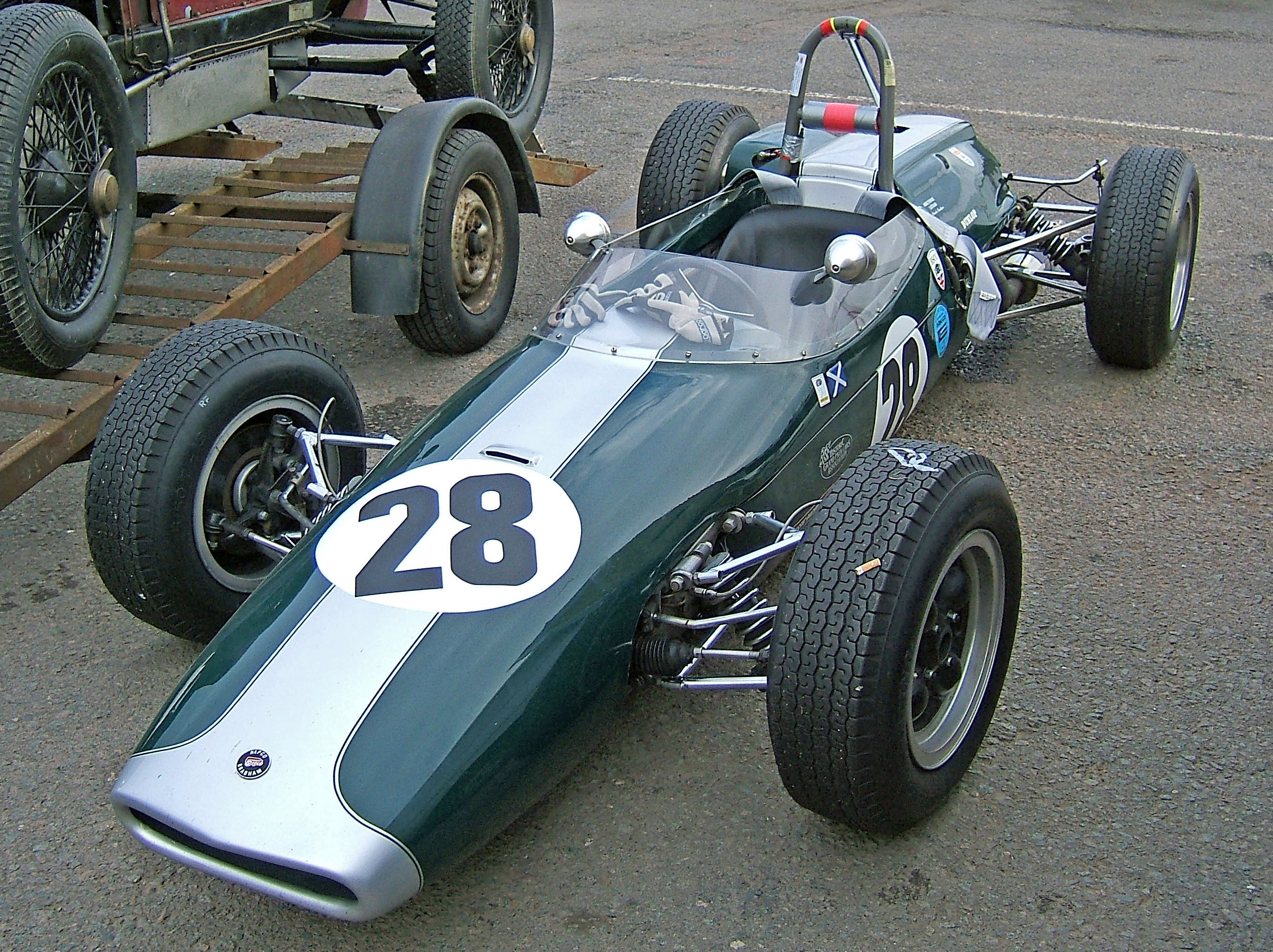
Brabham BT14 on display

The Brabham BT14 was an open-wheel mid-engined formula racing car, designed, developed and built by British manufacturer and constructor Brabham, in 1965. A total of 10 models were produced. It was specifically constructed to compete in Formula Libre racing. It competed in motor racing between 1965 and 1968; winning a total of 10 races (plus 2 additional class wins), scoring 22 podium finishes, and clinching 4 pole positions. It also contested the 1967 European F2 Championship season, competing in 7 races, but with no success; scoring no wins, pole positions, podium finishes, or scoring any points. It was powered by a naturally-aspirated 1.6 L (98 cu in) Ford twin-cam four-cylinder engine, which droves the rear wheels through a conventional 4-speed manual transmission.
