= Circuit de Monaco =

Temporary race track in Monte Carlo, Monaco

- Grand Prix circuit
- Location: La Condamine and Monte Carlo, Monaco
- Coordinates: 43°44′5″N 7°25′14″E
- Capacity: 37,000
- FIA Grade: 1 (GP)
- Opened: 14 April 1929; 97 years ago
- Major events: Current: Formula One; Monaco Grand Prix (1950, 1955–2019, 2021–present); FIA Formula Two; Monaco Grand Prix; FIA Formula Three; Monaco Grand Prix; Formula E Monaco ePrix (2015, 2017, 2019, 2021–present); Historic Grand Prix of Monaco (1997, biennial 2000–2018, 2021–2022, 2024, 2026)

Grand Prix Circuit (2015–present) (Tabac slightly moved)
- Length: 3.337 km (2.074 mi)
- Turns: 19
- Race lap record: 1:12.909 ( (United Kingdom) Lewis Hamilton, Mercedes W12, 2021, F1)

Extended Formula E Circuit (2021) (changes in Nouvelle Chicane)
- Length: 3.318 km (2.062 mi)
- Turns: 19
- Race lap record: 1:31.317 ( (Portugal) António Félix da Costa, DS E-Tense FE21, 2021, F-E)

Original Formula E Circuit (2015–2019)
- Length: 1.765 km (1.097 mi)
- Turns: 12
- Race lap record: 0:52.385 ( (Germany) Pascal Wehrlein, Mahindra M5Electro, 2019, F-E)

6th Variation (2003–2014) (tightened, slower chicane at exit of swimming pool section)
- Length: 3.340 km (2.075 mi)
- Turns: 19
- Race lap record: 1:14.439 ( (Germany) Michael Schumacher, Ferrari F2004, 2004, F1)

5th Variation (1997–2002) (redesigned swimming pool section)
- Length: 3.370 km (2.094 mi)
- Turns: 18
- Race lap record: 1:18.023 ( (Brazil) Rubens Barrichello, Ferrari F2002, 2002, F1)

4th Variation (1986–1996) (Nouvelle chicane added)
- Length: 3.328 km (2.068 mi)
- Turns: 20
- Race lap record: 1:21.076 ( (Germany) Michael Schumacher, Benetton B194, 1994, F1)

3rd Variation (1976–1985) (using tighter curves of Sainte Dévote and Antony Noghès)
- Length: 3.312 km (2.058 mi)
- Turns: 20
- Race lap record: 1:22.637 ( (Italy) Michele Alboreto, Ferrari 156/85, 1985, F1)

2nd Variation (1973–1975) (redesigned with new tunnel, swimming pool section)
- Length: 3.278 km (2.037 mi)
- Turns: 17
- Race lap record: 1:27.900 ( (Sweden) Ronnie Peterson, Lotus 72E, 1974, F1)

1st Variation (1955–1972) (chicane in the port moved further away from the tunnel)
- Length: 3.145 km (1.954 mi)
- Turns: 13
- Race lap record: 1:22.200 ( (United Kingdom) Jackie Stewart, Tyrrell 004, 1971, F1)

Original Circuit (1929–1954)
- Length: 3.180 km (1.976 mi)
- Turns: 14
- Race lap record: 1:46.5 ( (Germany) Rudolf Caracciola, Mercedes-Benz W125, 1937, Grand Prix)

The Circuit de Monaco is a 3.337 km (2.074 mi) street circuit laid out on the city streets of Monte Carlo and La Condamine around the harbour of the Principality of Monaco. It is commonly, and even officially, referred to as "Monte Carlo" because it is largely inside the Monte Carlo neighbourhood of Monaco.

The circuit is annually used on three weekends in April–May for Formula One Monaco Grand Prix, Formula E Monaco ePrix and Historic Grand Prix of Monaco. Formula One's respective feeder series over the years – Formula 3000, GP2 Series and today the Formula 2 and FIA Formula 3 championships and Porsche Supercup – also visit the circuit concurrently with Formula One. The Monaco Grand Prix is one of the three events victories which count towards the Triple Crown of Motorsport.

== History ==
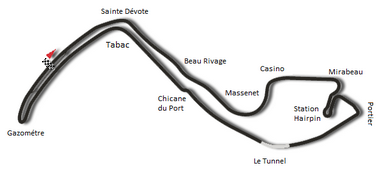
The original layout of the track

The idea for a Grand Prix race around the streets of Monaco came from Antony Noghès, the president of the Monegasque motor club, Automobile Club de Monaco, and close friend of the ruling Grimaldi family. The inaugural race was held in 1929 and was won by William Grover-Williams in a Bugatti.

To date, only four local drivers have won a race at the circuit. Louis Chiron did it at the non-championship 1931 Monaco Grand Prix; 82 years later, Stefano Coletti crossed the line in first position at the sprint race of the 2013 Monaco GP2 Series round. The third driver to do so was Stéphane Richelmi at the sprint race of the 2014 Monaco GP2 Series round. The fourth and most recent was Charles Leclerc at the 2024 Monaco Grand Prix. Leclerc was the first Monégasque to win the Monaco Grand Prix as an event of the Formula One World Championship. One year later, Lando Norris clocked the fastest time in Monaco and the first ever lap to be below the 1:10’s there as well, he would go on to win the race afterwards.

== Evolution of the circuit ==
The track has remained substantially unchanged since its creation in 1929: as a city circuit, its conformation is closely linked to that of the principality's road system. The changes were almost entirely connected to redefinitions of the ordinary roads of the town.

In the first editions of the Grand Prix, the start and finish were placed on Boulevard Albert 1er (the innermost straight, which leads to the Sainte Dévote curve). In 1955 the start and finish were moved to the opposite straight, overlooking the promenade (that now houses the pit lane). At the time, neither the Piscine complex nor the "La Rascasse" hairpin existed: after the "Tabac" curve, the route proceeded in the lane that is parallel to today's starting straight: the two sections (separated only by a row of trees) were joined by a single narrow hairpin called the "Gasometer". As can be seen from the period films, in the second half of the 1950s the only existing lane after the Tabac was the one mentioned; in fact, in those years, the lane that we now call "promenade" with the two "Piscine" chicanes was not yet defined, and only in the 1960s images we can notice the progress of the landfilling about that portion of the bay, including the Piscine area which would be completed shortly thereafter.

In 1963 the starting line was moved back to Boulevard Albert 1er (opposite the promenade). The swimming pool and the waterfront lane that 10 years later would become part of the circuit had already been created, but at that point in time no changes were made to the track from the "Tabac" to the "Gasometer".

In 1972 the boxes were moved near the "Chicane" area of the port, so the chicane was relocated closer to the "Tabac" curve. After this, the track continued on the usual straight (parallel to the starting lane) using the "Gasometer" curve for the last time. This solution lasted only a year and, in the following months, the main works were completed in time for the 1973 Grand Prix with the construction of a new section, connecting the "Tabac" curve to "Piscine" (Stade Nautique). This change added 0.133 km (0.083 mi) to the circuit – bringing its total length to 3.278 km (2.037 mi) – adding the new portion along the harbour, which followed the layout of the swimming pool and ended in a new chicane around the "La Rascasse" restaurant and a slight climb to the "Antony Noghès Curve" before rejoining the starting straight. The boxes were reinstalled in the old lane (now free). 1972 was also the last year for the passage through the old tunnel.

In 1973, as anticipated, the track was modified at various points also due to the construction of new civil buildings. In particular, a new hotel was under construction in the "Old Station" hairpin area (Hotel Loews, later renamed Fairmont), resulting in an extension of the tunnel towards the "Portier" curve. Images and videos from 1973 show the unusual passage under the new long tunnel, above which the pillars of the Loews hotel are being built. At the exit of the tunnel there was the traditional port chicane and, after the "Tabac" curve, the new path adjacent to the swimming pools (two "S" left–right and right–left connected by a short straight) and "La Rascasse" hairpin. It was the first year for the new garages in an independent lane, with an entrance just after "La Rascasse", where an asphalt slide was installed to overcome the difference in level from the roadway.

In 1976 the "Sainte Dévote" and "Antony Noghès" corners were modified: in order to slow down the transit of the cars, curbs and protections were repositioned.

In 1986, thanks to the expansion of the roadway implemented in the chicane area of the port, the chicane itself was modified and made slower: instead of the previously existing fast change of direction, deemed too dangerous, new curbs were installed to design a double turn at 90 degrees. It was then renamed "Nouvelle Chicane".

In 1997 the first "Piscine" corner was modified: the shifting of the track edge protections improved the visibility for the drivers and allowed a higher speed. A year later (at the request of Pasquale Lattuneddu, chief operating officer of Formula One Management), the whole area of the paddock was surrounded with shatterproof fences, in order to reduce and better manage the people authorised to access them.

In 2003 the second "Piscine" curve underwent a treatment similar to that of the first curve, with the shifting of the barriers to improve visibility, while the arrangement of new temporary curbs went to slow down the passage of the cars. However, the most important novelty was the widening of the port lane: in this way the segment between "Piscine" and "La Rascasse" could be rectified, becoming faster and less demanding. The extra space also allowed for the installation of new grandstands and the expansion of the pit lane, which was also equipped with semi-permanent two-storey buildings (instead of the previous tiny prefabricated structures) to better accommodate the teams, the technicians and the material.

Before the 2007 season, the internal curb of the "Grand Hotel" hairpin was significantly lowered and widened, in order to allow the single-seaters to climb on it and eventually face the curve with a narrower trajectory.

Since the 2003 edition, the traffic divider at the "Sainte Dévote" curve has been removed in order to widen the track: the track design is now left to the curb only. This has meant, for safety reasons, an extension of the exit lane from the pits: in practice, once the "proper" pit lane has been left, the drivers must remain in the yellow line that "cuts" the "Sainte Dévote".

The pit lane was further revised in 2004 by reversing the position of the pits with respect to the lane itself, building a much larger and more welcoming structure. Monaco has thus become the only Formula 1 circuit in which the pits are not facing the track, but rather physically separate it from the pit lane.

In 2011, after some accidents that occurred during the race weekend (the Mexican driver Sergio Pérez suffered a rather serious one), the drivers urged a change in the sector between the exit of the tunnel and the "Nouvelle Chicane", complaining (above all) about the disconnection of the road surface and incorrect positioning of the guard rail in the escape route opposite the tunnel. However, these requests were not followed up.

In 2015 the "Tabac" curve was re-profiled, slightly anticipating the entrance and thus shortening the track by three metres (from 3.340 km (2.075 mi) to 3.337 km (2.074 mi) today).

== Characteristics ==
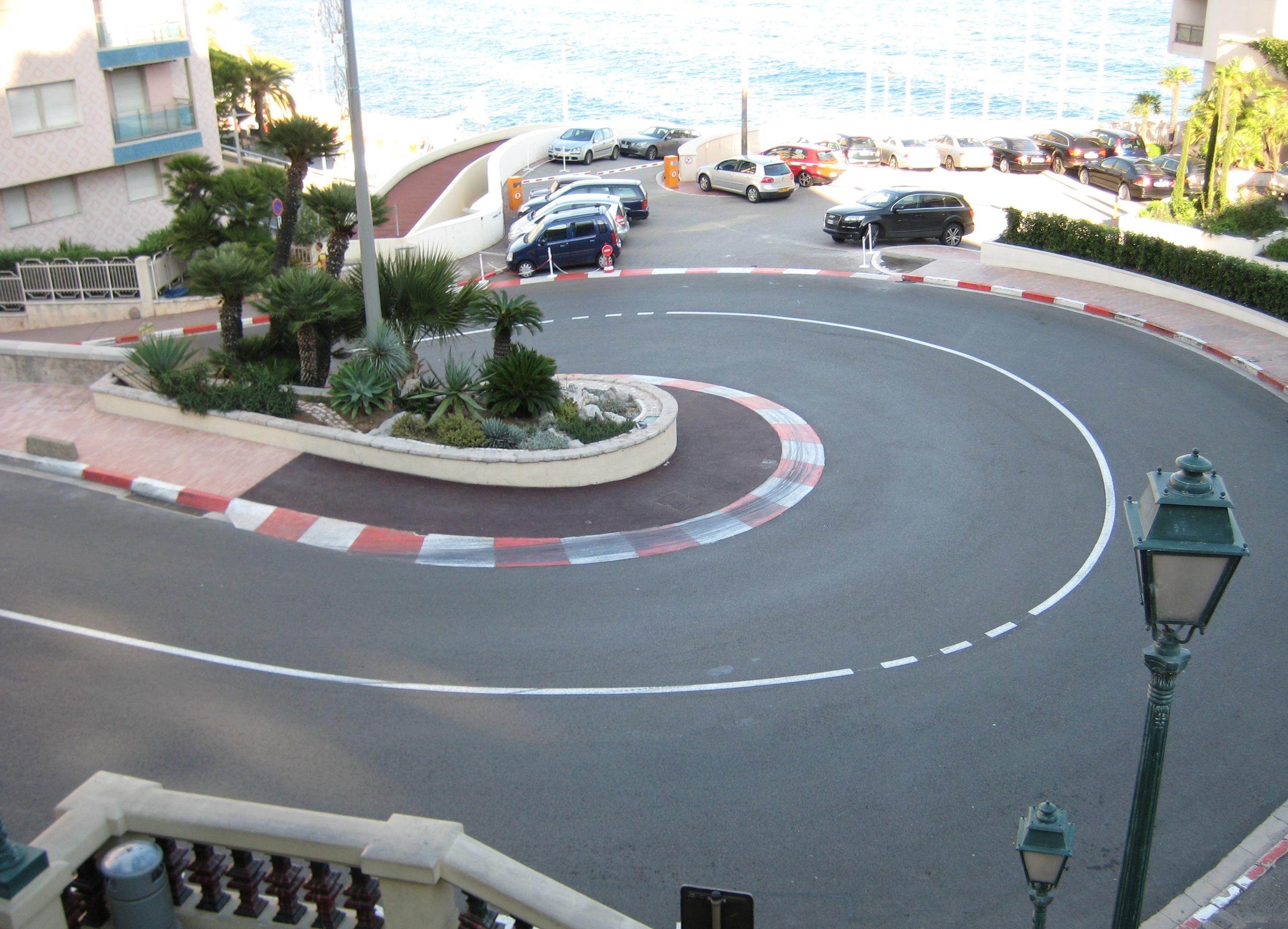
Entrance of the Fairmont Hairpin

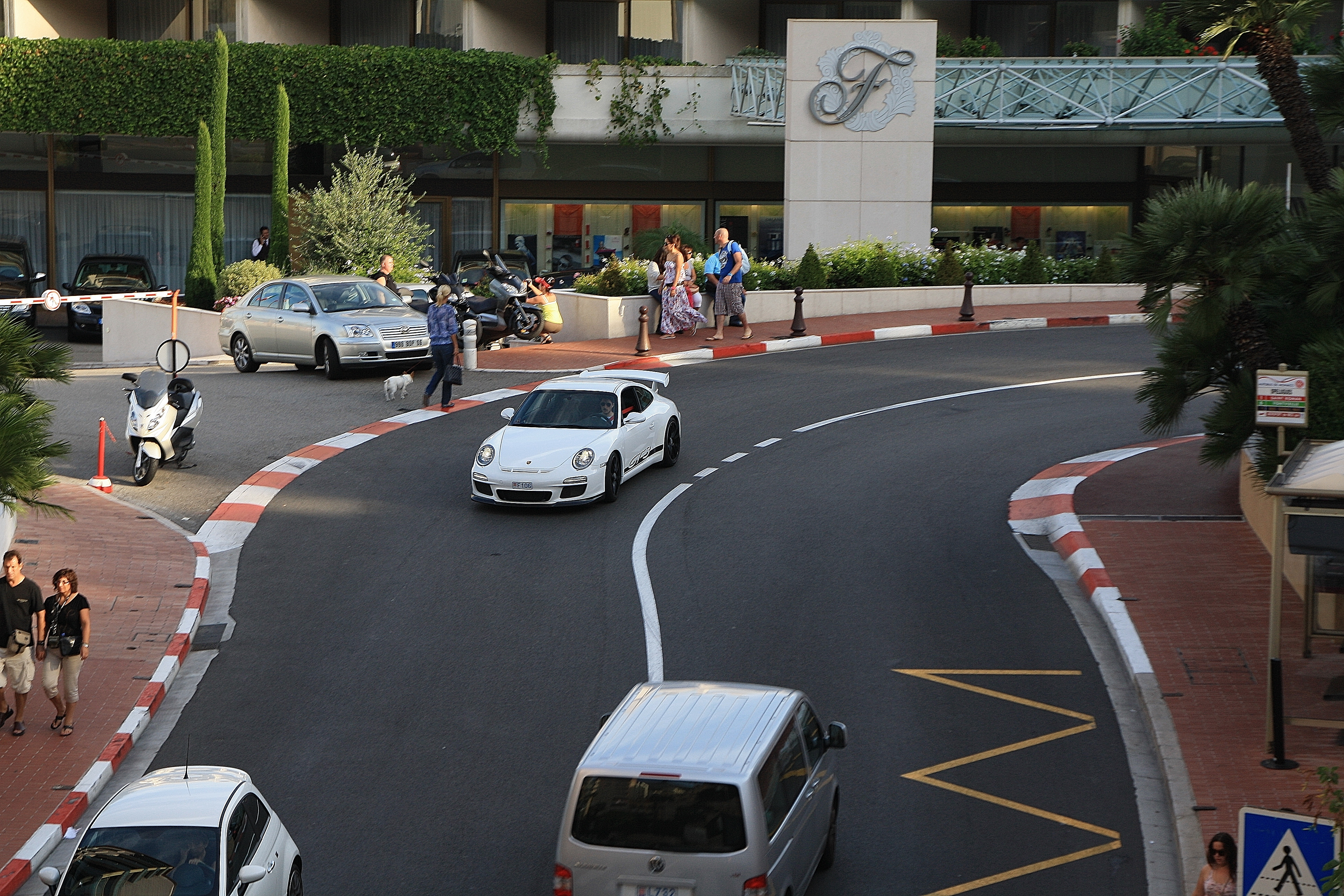
Exit of the Fairmont Hairpin

The building of the circuit takes six weeks, and the dismantling after the race another three weeks. The race circuit is narrow, with many elevation shifts and tight corners. These features make it perhaps the most demanding track in Formula One racing. Although the course has changed many times during its history, it is still considered the ultimate test of driving skills in Formula One. It contains both the slowest corner in Formula One (the Fairmont Hairpin, taken at just 48 km/h or 30 mph) and one of the quickest (the flat out kink in the tunnel, three turns beyond the hairpin, taken at 260 km/h or 160 mph).

Due to the tight and twisty nature of the circuit, it favours the skill of the drivers over the power of the cars. However, there is very little overtaking as the course is so narrow and dangerous, as demonstrated by the 2021 Monaco Grand Prix having only one overtake in a 78 lap race (when Mick Schumacher overtook his teammate Nikita Mazepin on the opening lap). Nelson Piquet likened racing round the course to "riding a bicycle around your living room". Prior to 1987, the number of cars starting the race was limited to 20, compared to 26 at other circuits. The famous tunnel section (running under the Fairmont Hotel, marked in grey in the circuit diagram above) is said to be difficult for drivers to cope with due to the quick switch from light to dark, then back to light again, at one of the fastest points of the course. As a result, race outcomes tend to be decided by grid positions as well as pit strategies, and the race is extremely hard on gearboxes and brakes.

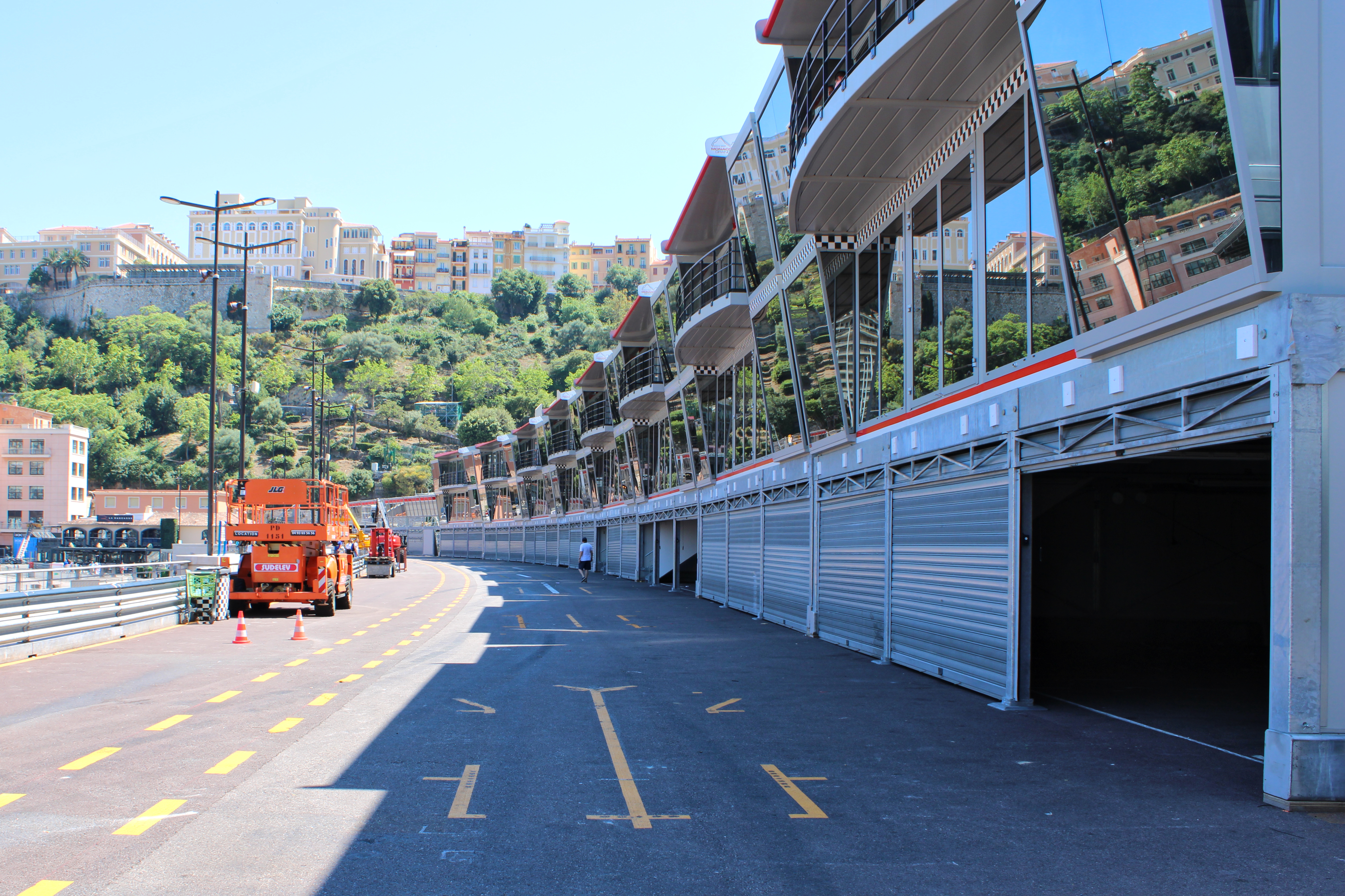
New pit garages

Several attempts have been made to improve cramped conditions in the pit garages. In 2002, a substantial amount of land was reclaimed from the harbour to slightly change the shape of one section of the circuit; this left more space for new pit garages, which debuted in the 2004 event.

The circuit is generally recognized to be less safe than other circuits used for Formula One. Driver and former winner Michael Schumacher stated before the 2012 Grand Prix that the additional risk is "justifiable once a year". If it were not already an existing Grand Prix, it would not be permitted to be added to the Formula One schedule, for safety reasons.

In January 2009, the circuit was voted top of the "Seven Sporting Wonders of the World" in a poll of 3,500 British sports fans.

=== A lap of the modern-day circuit ===
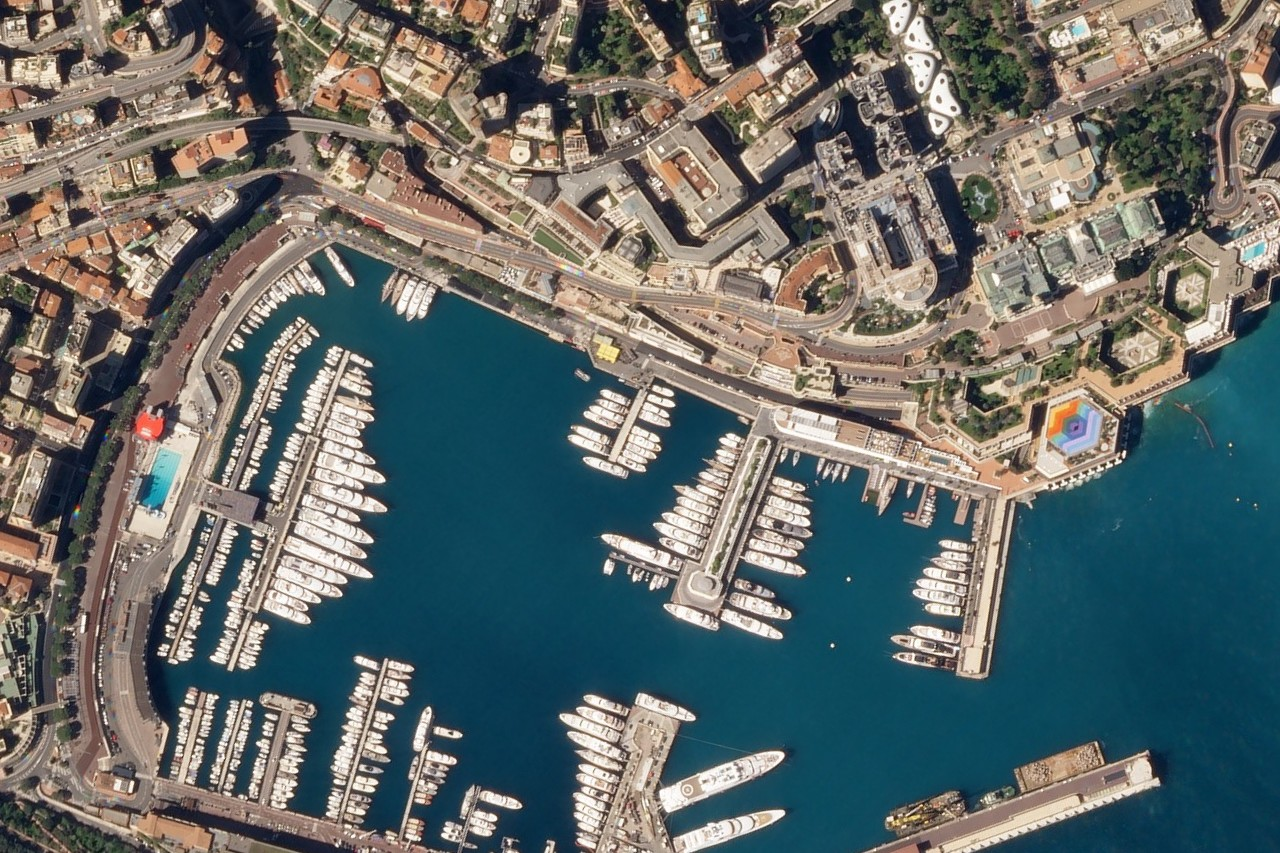
Satellite picture of the track in 2018

Today's track with the local streets shown

The lap starts with a short sprint up Boulevard Albert Ier, to the tight Sainte-Dévote corner, named after Sainte-Dévote Chapel, a small church just beyond the barriers. This is a nearly 90-degree right-hand bend usually taken in first or second gear. This corner has seen many first lap accidents, although these are less common since the removal of the mini roundabout on the apex of the corner before the 2003 event, making the entrance to the corner wider. The cars then head uphill along Avenue d'Ostende, before changing down for the long left-hander at Massenet. The maximum gradient in this part of the circuit is around 12%.

Out of Massenet, the cars drive past the famous casino, Monte Carlo Casino, before quickly reaching the aptly named Casino Square. This part of the track is 44 m (144 ft) higher than the lowest part. The cars snake down Avenue des Beaux Arts, the next short straight, avoiding an enormous bump on the left of the track, a reminder of the unique nature of the circuit. This leads to the tight Mirabeau corner, which is followed by a short downhill burst to the even tighter Fairmont Hairpin (was known as the Station Hairpin before the hotel was opened on the site in 1973; the hairpin's name changed depending on the name on the hotel). It is a corner which has been used for many overtaking manoeuvres in the past. However, it would be almost physically impossible for two modern F1 cars to go round side by side, as the drivers must use full steering lock to get around. It is so tight that many Formula 1 teams must redesign their steering and suspension specifically to negotiate this corner.

After the hairpin, the cars head downhill again to a double right-hander called Portier, named after the region of Monaco, before heading into the famous tunnel, a unique feature of a Formula One circuit. (Until 2009 only one other circuit, Detroit in 1982–1988, featured a tunnel, but the F1 series now includes racing at the Yas Marina Circuit in Abu Dhabi, which presents a shorter tunnel at the exit of the pit lane.) As well as the change of light making visibility poor, a car can lose 20–30% of its downforce due to the unique aerodynamic properties of the tunnel. The tunnel also presents a unique problem when it rains. As it is virtually indoors, the tunnel usually remains dry while the rest of the track is wet, with only the cars bringing in water from their tyres. Famously before the very wet 1984 race, Formula One boss Bernie Ecclestone had local fire crews wet down the road in the tunnel to give it the same surface grip as the rest of the track. This was done at the request of McLaren driver Niki Lauda.

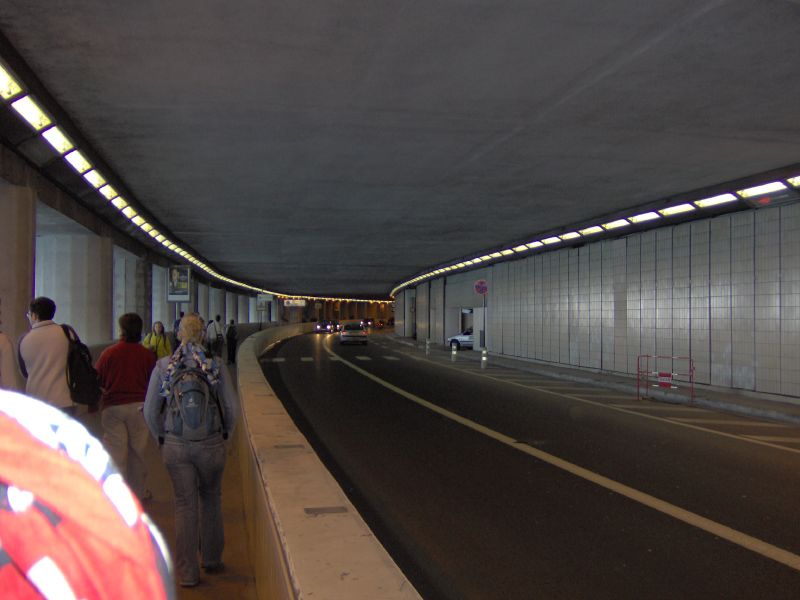
The tunnel

Out of the tunnel, the cars have to brake hard for the tight left–right–left Nouvelle Chicane. This has been the scene of several large accidents, including that of Karl Wendlinger in 1994, Jenson Button in 2003 and Sergio Pérez in 2011. The chicane is generally the only place on the circuit where overtaking can be attempted. There is a short straight to Tabac, so called as there used to be a tobacconist on the outside of the corner. Tabac is a tight fourth-gear corner which is taken at about 195 km/h (121 mph). Accelerating up to 225 km/h (140 mph), the cars reach Piscine, a fast left–right followed by a slower right–left chicane which takes the cars past the Rainier III Nautical Stadium, its swimming pool gives its name to the corner.

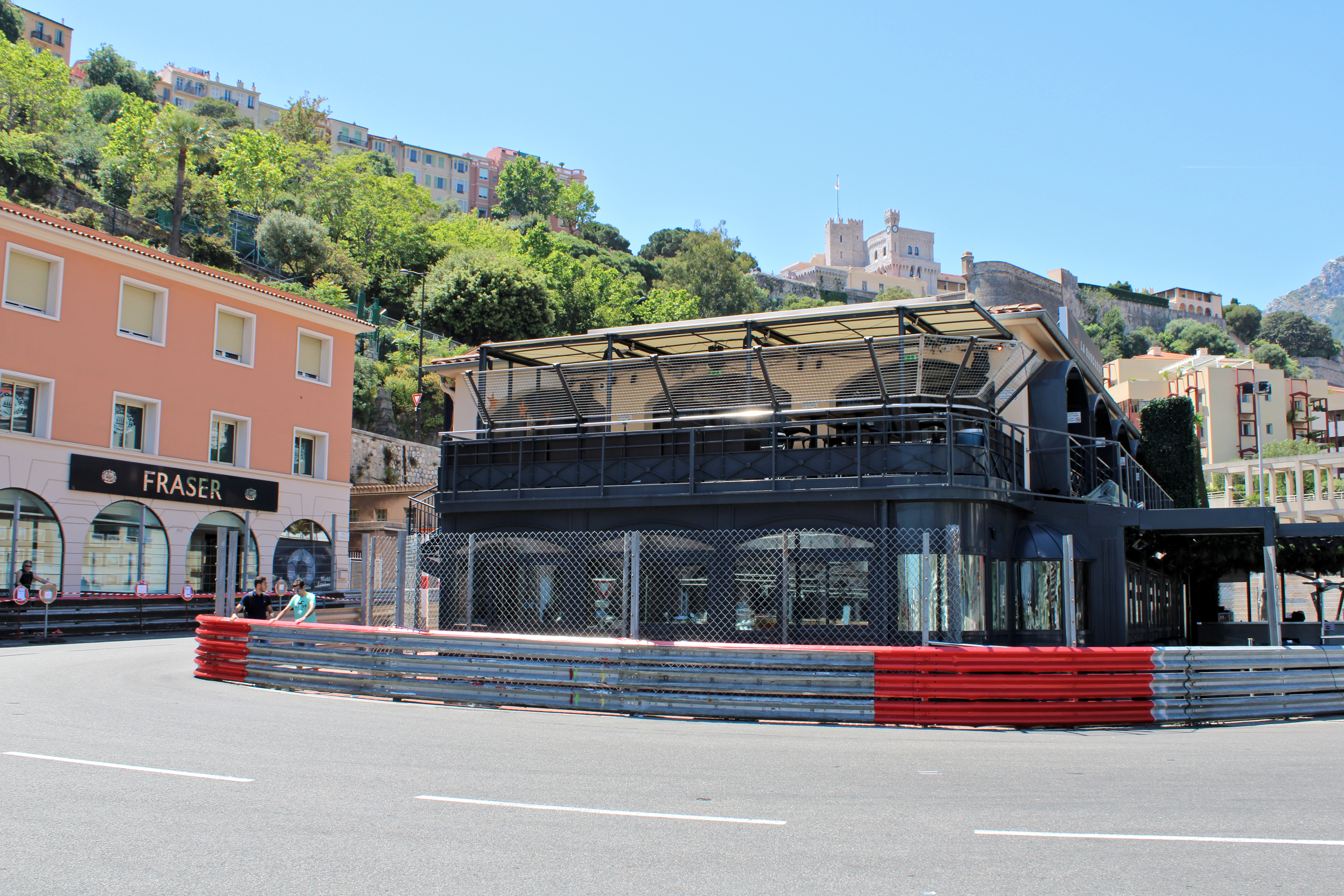
La Rascasse

Following Piscine, there is a short straight followed by heavy braking for a quick left which is immediately followed by the tight 135-degree right-hander called La Rascasse. This is another corner that requires full steering lock; it is remembered as the location of one of the most suspicious manoeuvres in recent Formula One history when Michael Schumacher appeared to deliberately stop his car during qualifying for the 2006 race so as to prevent Fernando Alonso and Mark Webber – who were both following and were on flying laps – from out-qualifying him. Rascasse takes the cars into a short straight that precedes the final corner, Virage Antony Noghès. Named after the organiser of the first Monaco Grand Prix, the corner is a tight right-hander which brings the cars back onto the start-finish straight, and across the line to start a new lap.

Monaco is one of the three circuits which have only one DRS zone, the others being Suzuka and Imola. During the race, it is active along the pit straight from Antony Noghès to Sainte-Dévote, for a total of 510 m (560 yd).

=== Mechanical adaptations ===
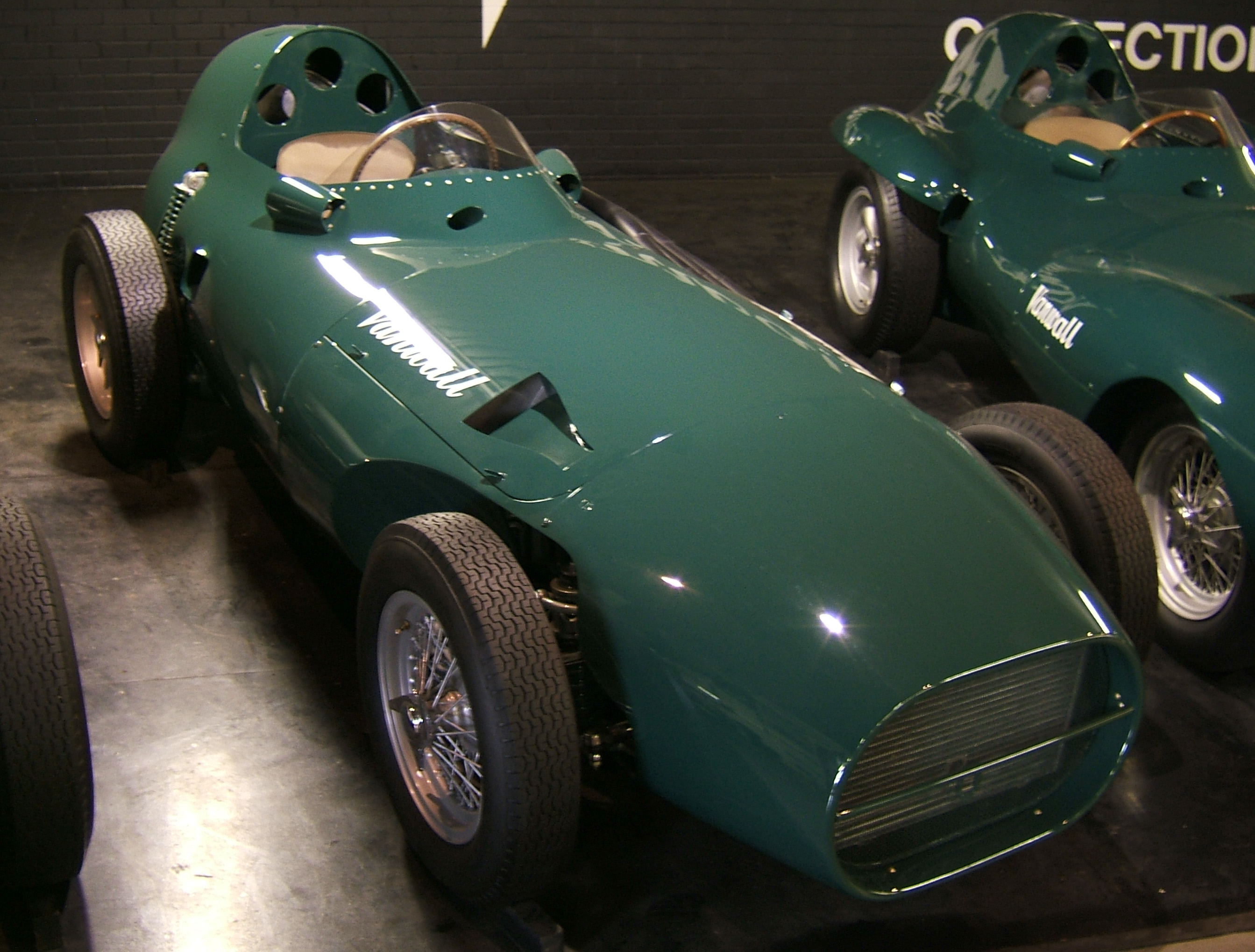
Vanwall VW7, showing the wide radiator intake "Monaco nose" used during the 1958 Monaco Grand Prix.

Monaco's street circuit places very different demands on the cars in comparison to the majority of the other circuits used during a Championship season. The cars are set up with high downforce; not as is popularly believed to increase cornering speeds, as many of the corners are taken at such a low speed to negate any aerodynamic effect, but instead to shorten braking times and keep the cars stable under acceleration. Many teams use special wing assemblies incorporating extra active planes in addition to those in use for other circuits. The Jordan and Arrows teams tried to use new mid-wings in 2001. The Arrows wing was similar in design to a normal rear wing but smaller and suspended above the nose cone. Jordan had a small wing suspended on a short pole just in front of the driver. Both were designed to improve downforce, but, after testing them during Thursday practice, the FIA banned both.

Brake wear is not a problem during a race in Monaco. Instead, the low speeds mean the issue is keeping the brakes up to working temperature. The only heavy braking points are at the chicane after the tunnel, and to a lesser extent into the Sainte-Dévote and Mirabeau corners. With a lack of temperature, brake bite becomes a problem, as the surface of the carbon brake disc becomes smooth as glass, reducing friction between the pads and the disk, hence lessening braking power. To combat this, in 2006 Juan Pablo Montoya adopted discs with radial grooves that increased the bite rate between disk and pads, increasing the average temperature of the brakes.

Conversely, cooling the cars' engines is a major concern. Formula One cars do not incorporate any form of forced cooling, relying solely on air moving over the car to remove heat from the radiator elements. In the past many teams used to adjust the radiator intakes to allow for extra airflow, creating the once-common "Monaco nose". Before 2014, teams also used closer ratio gears, as there are hardly any long straights in Monaco and acceleration is at a premium (starting from the 2014 season, the same gear ratios must be used throughout the season). A special steering rack with a larger pinion gear is also fitted to allow the cars to be driven around the tightest corners.

== In other sports ==
Map of the shorter version of the Circuit de Monaco, which was used for the Monaco ePrix in the 2014–15, 2016–17 and 2018–19 seasons.

=== FIA World Rally Championship ===
The circuit has been used as a special stage during the WRC Monte Carlo Rally, for instance in 2008 where it was a Super Special Stage duel. It used a shorter layout comparable to what would later become the original Formula E layout, but with some additional obstacles. One car would set off from the home straight, while the other would set off from between the main layout's turns 14 and 15. Each race was 2 laps.

The circuit returned in the 2026 edition. One car would drive at a time, and additional obstacles were placed along the track, with the start-finish marks moved to La Rascasse.

=== FIA Formula E Championship ===
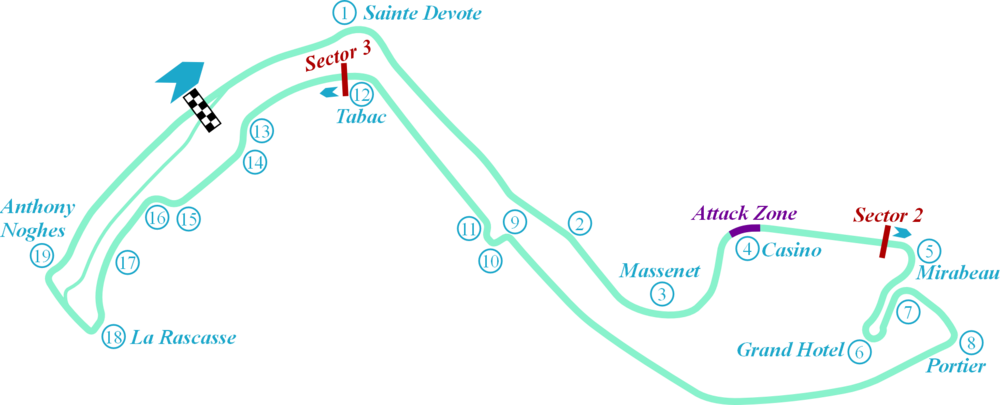
Map of the longer and new Formula E layout of the Circuit de Monaco, which was used for the Monaco ePrix for the 2020–21 season.

On 18 September 2014 it was announced the Formula E would be racing on a shorter 1.760 km (1.094 mi) version of the Monaco Grand Prix circuit, which was subsequently used for the 2014–15, 2016–17 and 2018–19 seasons. This layout omitted the regular section of the track between the climb up the hill at Beau Rivage and the Nouvelle Chicane at the exit of the tunnel, instead turning right immediately after Sainte Dévote to head downhill, before rejoining the regular layout by way of a 180 degree turn at the chicane.

Monaco was not scheduled to be on the calendar for the second season of Formula E because it took the slot on the calendar filled by the Historic Grand Prix at Monaco every other year. The inaugural Paris ePrix took its spot on the calendar for season two, with the Monaco ePrix reinstated for season three. This biennial agreement continued until after Formula E's fifth season.

A new track layout was used for the 2021 Monaco ePrix: the layout is similar to the Formula One layout, with only slight differences at turns 1 (Sainte Dévote) and 11 (Nouvelle Chicane). This new layout has a length of 3.318 km (2.062 mi); the distance of the track being increased due to the increase in car performance and range of Gen2 cars. The 2022 Monaco ePrix saw the race run on the full track layout and has used the regular layout since 2022.

=== Tour de France ===
Stage 1 of the 2009 Tour de France was an individual time trial that took place in part on the circuit, with riders starting from the main layout's start point. It would however quickly deviate from the Formula One layout by taking a left turn at Avenue Princesse Alice (right before the main layout's turn 3) before continuing through the southwest wards and into France, before arriving back in Monaco from its northeast and rejoining the Circuit at Portier. The finish line was at turn 15. The stage was won by Fabian Cancellara.

=== Vuelta a España ===
Stage 1 of the 2026 Vuelta a España was also held as an individual time trial. It extended past the circuit but stayed within Monaco. The 9.4 km course started out of the casino, followed the Boulevard des Moulins and Boulevard d'Italie and back to the casino. From there it followed the circuit through the Fairmont hairpin to Portier where it left for another detour on Avenue Princesse Grace, returning to the circuit for Portier, the tunnel and harbour section. After Rascasse the stage included a loop through Fontvieille, along Stade Louis II, before joining the circuit for a final time to end on the start-finish straight. Tadej Pogačar won in 10:57 minutes.

The second stage started in Monaco-Ville and followed the circuit throughe the start-finish straight, Sainte-Devote and to the casino, before leaving the circuit and the country.

== Events ==
Current

- April: Historic Grand Prix of Monaco
- May: Formula E Monaco ePrix
- June: Formula One Monaco Grand Prix, FIA Formula 2 Championship, FIA Formula 3 Championship, Porsche Supercup

Former

- FIA European Formula 3 Championship (1975)
- Formula 3 Euro Series (2005)
- Formula Regional European Championship (2021–2022)
- Formula Renault 3.5 Series (2005–2015)
- Formula Renault Eurocup (2016–2019)
- Formula Renault V6 Eurocup (2003–2004)
- GP2 Series
  - Monaco GP2 round (2005–2016)
- GP3 Series (2012)
- International Formula 3000
  - Monaco F3000 round (1998–2004)
- Jaguar I-Pace eTrophy (2019)
- Monaco Grand Prix Formula Three (1964–1997)

== Criticism ==
Since the 21st century, commentators and drivers have criticised the circuit's design, saying that it creates boring races. Criticism has been directed towards how few overtake attempts are performed, the slow speeds at which the cars take the Fairmont Hairpin, as well as how frequently the driver who sets the pole position wins. Fernando Alonso has said that the race is "the most boring race ever", and Lewis Hamilton stated that the 2018 Grand Prix "wasn't really racing." There have been various ideas on how to give racers more opportunity to pass, and one of these is to extend the race track along the east side of Hercules harbor and add a second DRS zone.

== Deaths from crashes ==
- 1948 – Norman Linnecar
- 1952 – Luigi Fagioli
- 1962 – Dennis Taylor
- 1967 – Lorenzo Bandini

== Layout history and lap records ==
As of June 2026, the layout history and fastest official race lap records at the Circuit de Monaco are listed as:

Circuit configuration	Circuit map	Class/category	Event	Time	Driver	Vehicle
Grand Prix Circuit (2015–present) (Tabac moved slightly) 3.337 km (2.074 mi)		Formula One	2021 Monaco Grand Prix	1:12.909	(United Kingdom) Lewis Hamilton	Mercedes-AMG F1 W12 E Performance
Grand Prix Circuit (2015–present) (Tabac moved slightly) 3.337 km (2.074 mi)		GP2	2016 Monaco GP2 Series round	1:21.554	(Japan) Nobuharu Matsushita	Dallara GP2/11
Grand Prix Circuit (2015–present) (Tabac moved slightly) 3.337 km (2.074 mi)		FIA Formula 2	2017 Monaco Formula 2 round	1:21.562	(United Kingdom) Oliver Rowland	Dallara GP2/11
Grand Prix Circuit (2015–present) (Tabac moved slightly) 3.337 km (2.074 mi)		Formula Renault 3.5	2015 Monaco Formula Renault 3.5 Series round	1:24.517	(United Kingdom) Oliver Rowland	Dallara T12
Grand Prix Circuit (2015–present) (Tabac moved slightly) 3.337 km (2.074 mi)		FIA Formula 3	2024 Monaco Formula 3 round	1:24.773	(Norway) Martinius Stenshorne	Dallara F3 2019
Grand Prix Circuit (2015–present) (Tabac moved slightly) 3.337 km (2.074 mi)		Formula E	2025 Monaco ePrix	1:27.846	(New Zealand) Nick Cassidy	Jaguar I-Type 7
Grand Prix Circuit (2015–present) (Tabac moved slightly) 3.337 km (2.074 mi)		Formula Regional	2022 Monaco FREC round	1:29.265	(Spain) Mari Boya	Tatuus F3 T-318
Grand Prix Circuit (2015–present) (Tabac moved slightly) 3.337 km (2.074 mi)		Historic Formula One	2024 Historic Grand Prix of Monaco	1:30.669	(United Kingdom) Stuart Hall	March 821
Grand Prix Circuit (2015–present) (Tabac moved slightly) 3.337 km (2.074 mi)		Formula Renault 2.0	2017 Monaco Formula Renault Eurocup round	1:31.222	(Luxembourg) Max Defourny	Tatuus FR2.0/13
Grand Prix Circuit (2015–present) (Tabac moved slightly) 3.337 km (2.074 mi)		Porsche Carrera Cup	2026 Monaco Porsche Supercup round	1:33.071	(South Africa) Keagan Masters	Porsche 911 (992 II) GT3 Cup
Grand Prix Circuit (2015–present) (Tabac moved slightly) 3.337 km (2.074 mi)		Historic Formula 2	2018 Historic Grand Prix of Monaco	1:53.633	(United Kingdom) Nick Padmore	Lotus 16
Grand Prix Circuit (2015–present) (Tabac moved slightly) 3.337 km (2.074 mi)		Historic Sports Cars	2026 Historic Grand Prix of Monaco	1:59.964	(United Kingdom) Richard Wilson	Maserati 250S (1957)
Grand Prix Circuit (2015–present) (Tabac moved slightly) 3.337 km (2.074 mi)		Pre-war Grand Prix	2022 Historic Grand Prix of Monaco	2:00.103	(United Kingdom) Mark Gillies	ERA R3A
Extended Formula E Circuit (2021) (changes in Nouvelle Chicane) 3.318 km (2.062 mi)		Formula E	2021 Monaco ePrix	1:34.428	(Belgium) Stoffel Vandoorne	Mercedes-EQ Silver Arrow 02
Short Formula E Circuit (2015–2019) 1.765 km (1.097 mi)		Formula E	2019 Monaco ePrix	0:52.385	(Germany) Pascal Wehrlein	Mahindra M5Electro
Short Formula E Circuit (2015–2019) 1.765 km (1.097 mi)		Jaguar I-Pace eTrophy	2019 Monaco Jaguar I-Pace eTrophy round	1:04.817	(Brazil) Cacá Bueno	Jaguar I-Pace eTrophy car
Grand Prix Circuit (2003–2014) (tightened, slower chicane at exit of swimming pool section) 3.340 km (2.075 mi)		Formula One	2004 Monaco Grand Prix	1:14.439	(Germany) Michael Schumacher	Ferrari F2004
Grand Prix Circuit (2003–2014) (tightened, slower chicane at exit of swimming pool section) 3.340 km (2.075 mi)		GP2	2008 Monaco GP2 Series round	1:21.338	(Brazil) Bruno Senna	Dallara GP2/08
Grand Prix Circuit (2003–2014) (tightened, slower chicane at exit of swimming pool section) 3.340 km (2.075 mi)		Formula Renault 3.5	2012 Monaco Formula Renault 3.5 Series round	1:22.916	(France) Jules Bianchi	Dallara T12
Grand Prix Circuit (2003–2014) (tightened, slower chicane at exit of swimming pool section) 3.340 km (2.075 mi)		F3000	2004 Monaco F3000 round	1:26.911	(Czech Republic) Tomas Enge	Lola B02/50
Grand Prix Circuit (2003–2014) (tightened, slower chicane at exit of swimming pool section) 3.340 km (2.075 mi)		Formula 3	2005 Monaco Grand Prix Formula Three	1:28.017	(Germany) Adrian Sutil	Dallara F305
Grand Prix Circuit (2003–2014) (tightened, slower chicane at exit of swimming pool section) 3.340 km (2.075 mi)		GP3	2012 Monaco GP3 Series round	1:28.747	(Philippines) Marlon Stöckinger	Dallara GP3/10
Grand Prix Circuit (2003–2014) (tightened, slower chicane at exit of swimming pool section) 3.340 km (2.075 mi)		Historic Formula One	2010 Historic Grand Prix of Monaco	1:32.989	(United Kingdom) Bobby Verdon-Roe	McLaren M26
Grand Prix Circuit (2003–2014) (tightened, slower chicane at exit of swimming pool section) 3.340 km (2.075 mi)		Porsche Carrera Cup	2014 Monaco Porsche Supercup round	1:37.616	(Germany) Klaus Bachler	Porsche 911 (991 I) GT3 Cup
Grand Prix Circuit (2003–2014) (tightened, slower chicane at exit of swimming pool section) 3.340 km (2.075 mi)		Historic Formula 3 2000cc	2012 Historic Grand Prix of Monaco	1:40.555	(United Kingdom) Ben Barker	Lola T670
Grand Prix Circuit (2003–2014) (tightened, slower chicane at exit of swimming pool section) 3.340 km (2.075 mi)		Historic Formula 2	2012 Historic Grand Prix of Monaco	1:53.113	(United States) Duncan Dayton	Lotus 16
Grand Prix Circuit (2003–2014) (tightened, slower chicane at exit of swimming pool section) 3.340 km (2.075 mi)		Formula Junior	2006 Historic Grand Prix of Monaco	1:54.730	(United Kingdom) Denis Welch	Merlyn Mk5/7
Grand Prix Circuit (2003–2014) (tightened, slower chicane at exit of swimming pool section) 3.340 km (2.075 mi)		Historic Formula 3 1000cc	2010 Historic Grand Prix of Monaco	1:57.181	(France) François Derossi	Chevron B17
Grand Prix Circuit (2003–2014) (tightened, slower chicane at exit of swimming pool section) 3.340 km (2.075 mi)		Pre-war Grand Prix	2014 Historic Grand Prix of Monaco	1:59.058	(United Kingdom) Matthew Grist	Alfa Romeo P3
Grand Prix Circuit (2003–2014) (tightened, slower chicane at exit of swimming pool section) 3.340 km (2.075 mi)		Historic Sports Cars	2014 Historic Grand Prix of Monaco	1:59.920	(United Kingdom) Alex Buncombe	Jaguar C-Type
Grand Prix Circuit (1997–2002) (redesigned swimming pool section) 3.370 km (2.094 mi)		Formula One	2002 Monaco Grand Prix	1:18.023	(Brazil) Rubens Barrichello	Ferrari F2002
Grand Prix Circuit (1997–2002) (redesigned swimming pool section) 3.370 km (2.094 mi)		F3000	2002 Monaco F3000 round	1:28.964	(Czech Republic) Tomas Enge	Lola B02/50
Grand Prix Circuit (1997–2002) (redesigned swimming pool section) 3.370 km (2.094 mi)		Formula 3	1997 Monaco Grand Prix Formula Three	1:32.935	(Germany) Nick Heidfeld	Dallara F397
Grand Prix Circuit (1997–2002) (redesigned swimming pool section) 3.370 km (2.094 mi)		Porsche Carrera Cup	2002 Monaco Porsche Supercup round	1:43.903	(France) Christophe Bouchut	Porsche 911 (996) GT3 Cup
Grand Prix Circuit (1997–2002) (redesigned swimming pool section) 3.370 km (2.094 mi)		Historic Formula One	2002 Historic Grand Prix of Monaco	1:44.182	(United Kingdom) Trevor Reeves	Tyrrell 008
Grand Prix Circuit (1997–2002) (redesigned swimming pool section) 3.370 km (2.094 mi)		Formula Junior	2002 Historic Grand Prix of Monaco	1:56.997	(United Kingdom) Denis Welch	Merlyn
Grand Prix Circuit (1997–2002) (redesigned swimming pool section) 3.370 km (2.094 mi)		Historic Sports Cars	1997 Historic Grand Prix of Monaco	2:02.703	(United Kingdom) Lindsay Owen-Jones	Maserati Tipo 61
Grand Prix Circuit (1997–2002) (redesigned swimming pool section) 3.370 km (2.094 mi)		Pre-war Grand Prix	2000 Historic Grand Prix of Monaco	2:11.899	(United Kingdom) Julian Majzub	Bugatti Type 35B
Grand Prix Circuit (1986–1996) (Nouvelle Chicane added) 3.328 km (2.068 mi)		Formula One	1994 Monaco Grand Prix	1:21.076	(Germany) Michael Schumacher	Benetton B194
Grand Prix Circuit (1986–1996) (Nouvelle Chicane added) 3.328 km (2.068 mi)		Formula 3	1996 Monaco Grand Prix Formula Three	1:34.654	(Italy) Andrea Boldrini	Dallara F395
Grand Prix Circuit (1986–1996) (Nouvelle Chicane added) 3.328 km (2.068 mi)		Jaguar Intercontinental Challenge	1991 Monaco Jaguar Intercontinental Challenge round	1:48.642	(United Kingdom) Derek Warwick	Jaguar XJR-15
Grand Prix Circuit (1976–1985) (using tighter curves of Sainte Dévote and Antony Noghès) 3.312 km (2.058 mi)		Formula One	1985 Monaco Grand Prix	1:22.637	(Italy) Michele Alboreto	Ferrari 156/85
Grand Prix Circuit (1976–1985) (using tighter curves of Sainte Dévote and Antony Noghès) 3.312 km (2.058 mi)		Formula 3	1984 Monaco Grand Prix Formula Three	1:33.617	(Italy) Claudio Langes	Ralt RT3
Grand Prix Circuit (1973–1975) (redesigned with new tunnel, swimming pool section) 3.278 km (2.037 mi)		Formula One	1974 Monaco Grand Prix	1:27.900	(Sweden) Ronnie Peterson	Lotus 72E
Grand Prix Circuit (1973–1975) (redesigned with new tunnel, swimming pool section) 3.278 km (2.037 mi)		Formula 3	1975 Monaco European F3 round	1:34.600	(United Kingdom) Tony Brise	Modus M1
Grand Prix Circuit (1955–1972) (chicane in the port moved further away from the tunnel) 3.145 km (1.954 mi)		Formula One	1971 Monaco Grand Prix	1:22.200	(United Kingdom) Jackie Stewart	Tyrrell 004
Grand Prix Circuit (1955–1972) (chicane in the port moved further away from the tunnel) 3.145 km (1.954 mi)		Formula 3	1969 Monaco Grand Prix Formula Three	1:32.300	(Sweden) Reine Wisell	Chevron B15
Grand Prix Circuit (1955–1972) (chicane in the port moved further away from the tunnel) 3.145 km (1.954 mi)		Formula Junior	1963 Monaco Grand Prix Formula Junior	1:39.500	(Australia) Frank Gardner	Brabham BT6
Original Grand Prix Circuit (1929–1954) 3.180 km (1.976 mi)		Grand Prix	1937 Monaco Grand Prix	1:46.500	(Germany) Rudolf Caracciola	Mercedes-Benz W125
Original Grand Prix Circuit (1929–1954) 3.180 km (1.976 mi)		Formula One	1950 Monaco Grand Prix	1:51.000	(Argentina) Juan Manuel Fangio	Alfa Romeo 158
Original Grand Prix Circuit (1929–1954) 3.180 km (1.976 mi)		Sports car racing	1952 Monaco Grand Prix	1:56.400	(Italy) Antonio Stagnoli	Ferrari 225 S

== Weather ==
The Monaco Grand Prix is run on the final Sunday of May, in a transition between spring and summer. Monaco, in general, has a hot-summer Mediterranean climate (Köppen Csa), although since the track is only used for a brief period in May, when it is being used it has a narrower temperature range than the principality itself has throughout the year. For the Monaco Grand Prix, temperatures are usually around 20 °C (68 °F) in terms of ambient conditions, whereas sun exposure can make the track itself a bit warmer than that. Still, soft tyre compounds often tend to hold up well around Monaco courtesy of surface temperatures being fairly moderate. The maritime moderation make May heatwaves rather unlikely.

Although the Mediterranean precipitation pattern leads to Monaco being quite dry by late May, due to the urban and narrow nature of the circuit, rainfall combined with the painted areas and the long tunnel makes wet racing extremely challenging. This was demonstrated by the 1984, 1996, 1997, 2008, 2016, 2022 and 2023 events. The 1984 event was red-flagged due to track conditions being deemed too dangerous with the race not being restarted. In 1996, the mixed-weather conditions caused carnage, paving way for Olivier Panis' shock win in an unfancied Ligier. The following year, the 1997 race winner Michael Schumacher got the chequered flag after just 62 of the planned 78 laps due to the very slow pace of half a minute slower than dry-weather lap times on the very wet track seeing the clock hit the two hours of maximum time well before the race distance was completed.

The tunnel can be sprinkled under wet conditions to provide for consistent track conditions, although during a full-wet race the tunnel gets drier throughout.

Climate data for Monaco (1981–2010 averages, extremes 1966–present)
Month	Jan	Feb	Mar	Apr	May	Jun	Jul	Aug	Sep	Oct	Nov	Dec	Year
Record high °C (°F)	19.9 (67.8)	23.2 (73.8)	25.6 (78.1)	26.2 (79.2)	30.3 (86.5)	32.5 (90.5)	34.4 (93.9)	34.5 (94.1)	33.1 (91.6)	29.0 (84.2)	25.0 (77.0)	22.3 (72.1)	34.5 (94.1)
Mean daily maximum °C (°F)	13.0 (55.4)	13.0 (55.4)	14.9 (58.8)	16.7 (62.1)	20.4 (68.7)	23.7 (74.7)	26.6 (79.9)	26.9 (80.4)	24.0 (75.2)	20.6 (69.1)	16.5 (61.7)	13.9 (57.0)	19.2 (66.6)
Daily mean °C (°F)	10.2 (50.4)	10.2 (50.4)	12.0 (53.6)	13.8 (56.8)	17.5 (63.5)	20.9 (69.6)	23.8 (74.8)	24.2 (75.6)	21.1 (70.0)	17.9 (64.2)	13.8 (56.8)	11.2 (52.2)	16.4 (61.5)
Mean daily minimum °C (°F)	7.4 (45.3)	7.4 (45.3)	9.1 (48.4)	10.9 (51.6)	14.6 (58.3)	18.0 (64.4)	21.0 (69.8)	21.4 (70.5)	18.3 (64.9)	15.2 (59.4)	11.2 (52.2)	8.5 (47.3)	13.6 (56.5)
Record low °C (°F)	−3.1 (26.4)	−5.2 (22.6)	−3.1 (26.4)	3.8 (38.8)	7.5 (45.5)	9.0 (48.2)	10.5 (50.9)	12.4 (54.3)	10.5 (50.9)	6.5 (43.7)	1.6 (34.9)	−1.0 (30.2)	−5.2 (22.6)
Average precipitation mm (inches)	67.7 (2.67)	48.4 (1.91)	41.2 (1.62)	71.3 (2.81)	49.0 (1.93)	32.6 (1.28)	13.7 (0.54)	26.5 (1.04)	72.5 (2.85)	128.7 (5.07)	103.2 (4.06)	88.8 (3.50)	743.6 (29.28)
Average precipitation days (≥ 1.0 mm)	6.0	4.9	4.5	7.3	5.5	4.1	1.7	2.5	5.1	7.3	7.1	6.5	62.4
Mean monthly sunshine hours	149.8	158.9	185.5	210.0	248.1	281.1	329.3	296.7	224.7	199.0	155.2	136.5	2,574.7
Source 1: Météo France
Source 2: Monaco website (sun only)

== See also ==
- The Chatham – a former bar near the Beau Rivage corner on the Circuit de Monaco that was popular with motor racing personalities
