= 2012 Historic Grand Prix of Monaco =

← Previous race	Next race →
- Circuit de Monaco

Race details
- Date: 11–13 May 2012
- Official name: 8e Grand Prix de Monaco Historique
- Location: Circuit de Monaco
- Course: Street circuit
- Course length: 3.340 km (2.075 miles)

The 2012 Historic Grand Prix of Monaco was the eighth running of the Historic Grand Prix of Monaco, a motor racing event for heritage Grand Prix, Voiturettes, Formula One, Formula Two and Sports cars.

== Report ==
Former F1 driver Arturo Merzario was entered for Race A in an Alfa Romeo 8C 35, but could not take part in any of the sessions due to mechanical issues.

Race D featured a Ferrari 1512, the car which carried Ferrari's first flat-12 engine. This car had recently been restored with the help of the original designer Mauro Forghieri; it was an early retirement due to mechanical teething problems, but was highly competitive in future events, finishing runner-up in 2016 and 2018.

Roger Wills set the fastest time in practice for Race E, but collided with another car and could not take the start of the race. Andrew Smith inherited pole position. The session was red-flagged and Duncan Dayton had no opportunity to set a representative lap time. He started the race from 22nd place but put on a storming drive, running 8th after the first lap and going on to win.

Race G saw such a large number of entries that the grid was decided by two qualifying races, with even-numbered cars forming the outside line and odd-numbered cars forming the inside line. Pole for the odd-numbered race was taken by Matteo Marzotto (nephew of 1952 Monaco Grand Prix winner Vittorio) in his first ever motor race, but Paolo Barilla passed him to claim the front-row spot. Pole for the feature was awarded to even-numbered race winner Ben Barker. The race was red-flagged due to rain after 10 laps.

The rain also caused Race F, the final session of the day, to be shortened. Oliver Hancock ran strongly in his first race in a F1 car, only to crash on the last lap. He was still classified seventh, the first car a lap down.

== Results ==
=== Summary ===
Série	Cars	Years	Pole position	Fastest lap		Race winner
A	Voiturettes and Grand Prix	Pre-1952	(United Kingdom) Julian Bronson	(United Kingdom) Julian Bronson	2:00.002	(United Kingdom) Julian Bronson
B	Formula 1 and Formula 2	Pre-1961		(United States) Duncan Dayton	1:53.113	(New Zealand) Roger Wills
C	Sports cars and sports prototypes	Pre-1953	(United Kingdom) Alex Buncombe	(United Kingdom) Alex Buncombe	2:03.291	(United Kingdom) Alex Buncombe
D	Grand Prix - rear engine	1961-1965	(United Kingdom) Andy Middlehurst	(United Kingdom) Andy Middlehurst	1:55.616	(United Kingdom) Andy Middlehurst
E	Formula 1 - 3 litre	1966-1972	(United Kingdom) Andrew Smith	(United Kingdom) Andrew Smith	1:37.450	(United States) Duncan Dayton
F	Formula 1 - 3 litre	1973-1978	(United Kingdom) Michael Lyons	(United Kingdom) Michael Lyons	1:59.140	(United Kingdom) Michael Lyons
G	Formula 3 - 2000 cm^{3}	Pre-1985	(United Kingdom) Ben Barker	(United Kingdom) Ben Barker	1:40.555	(United Kingdom) Ben Barker

=== Série A: Pre 1952 Voiturettes and Grand Prix Cars ===
Pos.	No.	Driver	Car	Year	Laps	Time/retired	Grid
1	36	(United Kingdom) Julian Bronson	ERA R4D	1938	10	20:17.794	1
2	32	(Republic of Ireland) Paddins Dowling	ERA B	1936	10	+0.736	
3	20	(Switzerland) Michael Gans	ERA B	1935	10	+48.035	
4	22	(United States) Ian Landy	ERA B	1936	10	+51.523	
5	2	(Germany) Frank Stippler	Maserati 8CM	1934	10	+59.427	
6	4	(Germany) Willi Balz	Maserati 8CM	1937	10	+1:15.598	
7	8	(United Kingdom) Thomas Dark	Bugatti 59/50BIII	1938	10	+2:10.858	
8	18	(France) Jean-Jacques Bally	Gordini T11/15	1947	10	+2:11.040	
9	66	(Italy) Federico Buratti	Maserati 6CM/4CM	1936	9	+1 lap	
10	24	(Germany) Rainer Ott	ERA B	1936	9	+1 lap	
11	10	(United States) Ed Davies	Alfa Romeo 8C Monza	1932	9	+1 lap	
12	46	(United Kingdom) Richard Last	MG Parnell K3	1933	9	+1 lap	
13	48	(France) Thierry Chanoine	Riley Dobbs	1935	9	+1 lap	
14	26	(Germany) Klaus Lehr	Talbot-Lago T26C	1948	9	+1 lap	
15	52	(Belgium) Christian Dumolin	Maserati A6GCS	1947	9	+1 lap	
16	6	(France) Paul-Emile Bessade	Bugatti 51	1934	9	+1 lap	
17	50	(France) Ralf Emmerling	Riley Brooklands	1928	9	+1 lap	
18	38	(United Kingdom) David Hands	Bugatti 39	1925	9	+1 lap	
19	16	(France) Eric Leroy	Gordini T11/15	1947	8	+2 laps	
20	42	(Switzerland) Jürg König	Bugatti 37A	1926	8	+2 laps	
21	40	(United Kingdom) Julia de Baldanza	Bugatti 35B	1929	8	+2 laps	
22	44	(Argentina) Manuel Eliçabe	Bugatti 37	1926	8	+2 laps	
23	12	(United Kingdom) Tony Smith	Alfa Romeo P3	1934	5	+5 laps	
24	34	(United States) Charles McCabe	ERA B	1936	2	+8 laps	
DNS	54	(Switzerland) Roland Portmann	Maserati 4CL	1939			
DNS		(Italy) Arturo Merzario	Alfa Romeo 8C 35	1935			

=== Série B: Pre 1961 Grand Prix Cars and F2 ===
Pos.	No.	Driver	Car	Year	Laps	Time/retired	Grid
1	60	(New Zealand) Roger Wills	Cooper T51	1959	10	19:14.304	1/2
2	30	(United Kingdom) Gary Pearson	BRM P25	1958	10	+14.531	
3	34	(United Kingdom) Barrie Baxter	BRM P48	1960	10	+43.556	
4	56	(United Kingdom) Nick Wigley	Cooper T51	1959	10	+57.731	
5	26	(United Kingdom) Tony Wood	Tec-Mec 250F	1958	10	+58.084	
6	44	(United Kingdom) Eddie McGuire	Lotus 16	1958	10	+1:09.251	
7	2	(United Kingdom) Ian Nuthall	Alta F2	1952	10	+1:26.249	
8	14	(Belgium) Paul Grant	Cooper T23 (Mk2)	1953	10	+1:30.613	
9	16	(United Kingdom) William Nuthall	Cooper T23 (Mk2)	1953	10	+1:31.015	
10	24	(Germany) Willi Balz	Maserati 250F	1958	10	+1:41.286	
11	38	(United Kingdom) Marshall Bailey	JBW Type 1	1959	10	+1:53.910	
12	8	(Netherlands) Adrien van der Kroft	HWM-Alta F2/52	1952	9	+1 lap	
13	50	(United Kingdom) Allan Miles	Cooper T41	1957	9	+1 lap	
14	52	(United Kingdom) John Bussey	Cooper T43	1957	9	+1 lap	
15	18	(United Kingdom) Steve Russell	Cooper T23 (Mk2)	1953	9	+1 lap	
16	40	(Germany) Wulf Goetze	Cooper T40 Bobtail	1955	9	+1 lap	
17	10	(Belgium) Marc Valvekens	Gordini 16	1952	9	+1 lap	
18	28	(Italy) Beppe Gabbiani	Lancia Marino F1	1954	9	+1 lap	
19	42	(United States) Duncan Dayton	Lotus 16	1959	8	+2 laps	1/2
20	20	(United Kingdom) Julia de Baldanza	Maserati A6GCM	1951	8	+2 laps	
21	58	(Italy) Marco Masini	Cooper T51	1959	8	+2 laps	
22	4	(United Kingdom) Kurt Engelhorn	Connaught A	1953	8	+2 laps	
23	62	(Monaco) Andrea Giuliani	Cooper T51	1961	7	+3 laps	
24	48	(United Kingdom) John Chisholm	Lotus 18	1960	1	+9 laps	
25	12	(United Kingdom) Barry Wood	Cooper T20 (Mk1)	1952	1	+9 laps	
26	46	(Spain) Joaquín Folch-Rusiñol	Lotus 16	1959	1	+9 laps	
DNS	36	(United Kingdom) Tony Smith	Ferrari Dino 246	1960			
DNS	54	(United Kingdom) Joe Twyman	Cooper T45	1958			

=== Série C: Pre 1953 Sports and Sports Prototypes Cars ===
Pos.	No.	Driver	Car	Year	Laps	Time/retired	Grid
1	66	(United Kingdom) Alex Buncombe	Jaguar C-Type	1952	10	20:59.385	1
2	28	(United Kingdom) John Ure	Frazer Nash Le Mans Replica (Mk2)	1952	10	+30.282	
3	68	(Brazil) Carlos Monteverde	Jaguar C-Type	1952	10	+54.621	
4	56	(United Kingdom) Nick Wigley	Gordini T23S	1949	10	+1:07.852	
5	64	(United Kingdom) David Wenman	Jaguar C-Type	1952	10	+1:24.972	
6	78	(Italy) Massimiliano Bettati	Allard J2X	1952	10	+1:28.135	
7	8	(Germany) Lutz Rathenow	Veritas RS2000	1948	10	+1:36.871	
8	74	(United Kingdom) Mark Midgley	Aston Martin DB3	1952	10	+1:38.718	
9	60	(United Kingdom) Nigel Webb	Jaguar C-Type	1952	10	+1:39.843	
10	6	(Austria) Dieter Quester	BMW 328	1937	10	+1:41.567	
11	16	(United Kingdom) James Wood	Frazer Nash Le Mans Replica	1950	10	+1:42.410	
12	12	(United Kingdom) Philip Champion	Frazer Nash Mille Miglia	1951	10	+2:06.750	
13	72	(Germany) Wolfgang Friedrichs	Aston Martin DB3	1952	10	+2:15.796	
14	76	(United Kingdom) Martin Melling	Aston Martin DB3	1952	9	+1 lap	
15	18	(United States) John Breslow	Frazer Nash Le Mans Replica (Mk2)	1952	9	+1 lap	
16	14	(United Kingdom) Holly Mason-Franchitti	Frazer Nash Competition	1949	9	+1 lap	
17	10	(Spain) Juan Quintano	Ferrari 166 MM	1950	9	+1 lap	
18	2	(Spain) Carlos de Miguel	OSCA MT4	1950	9	+1 lap	
19	58	(United States) Najeeb Khan	Ferrari 225 S	1952	9	+1 lap	
20	77	(United States) Alan Patterson	Allard J2X	1952	8	+2 laps	
21	20	(United Kingdom) Patrick Blakeney-Edwards	Frazer Nash Le Mans Replica (Mk2)	1952	5	+5 laps	
22	80	(United Kingdom) Patrick Watts	Allard J2	1950	3	+7 laps	

=== Série D: 1961 - 1965, rear engined Grand Prix cars ===
Pos.	No.	Driver	Car	Year	Laps	Time/retired	Grid
1	9	(United Kingdom) Andy Middlehurst	Lotus 25	1962	12	23:42.253	1
2	19	(United Kingdom) Sidney Hoole	Cooper T66	1963	12	+9.759	3
3	14	(United Kingdom) Paul Drayson	Lotus 24	1962	12	+10.854	2
4	1	(United Kingdom) Roy Walzer	Brabham BT11	1964	12	+37.018	
5	38	(United Kingdom) Alan Baillie	Cooper T71	1964	12	+40.962	
6	8	(United Kingdom) Dan Collins	Lotus 21	1961	12	+41.832	
7	12	(Belgium) Michel Wanty	Lotus 24	1962	12	+50.369	
8	6	(United Kingdom) John Elliott	Lotus 18	1960	12	+1:18.907	
9	36	(United Kingdom) Alex Morton	Lotus 21	1961	12	+1:34.388	
10	22	(United Kingdom) David Coplowe	Lotus 24	1962	12	+1:35.296	
11	2	(United Kingdom) Nigel Williams	Lotus 24	1962	12	+2:17.224	
12	26	(France) "Mister John of B"	Lola Mk4	1962	11	+1 lap	
13	5	(Italy) Jason Wright	ATS 100	1964	11	+1 lap	
14	32	(Germany) Rudolf Ernst	Lotus 18	1961	11	+1 lap	
15	17	(Argentina) Jorge Ferioli	Lola Mk4	1962	11	+1 lap	
16	30	(United Kingdom) Stephen Bond	Lotus 18	1961	11	+1 lap	
17	28	(Italy) Ross Zampatti	De Tomaso F1	1961	11	+1 lap	
18	7	(Australia) Scotty Taylor	Lotus 18	1961	11	+1 lap	
19	40	(United Kingdom) Rodger Newman	Brabham BT14	1965	11	+1 lap	
20	24	(United Kingdom) Brian Anthony Ashby	Emeryson F1	1961	11	+1 lap	
21	4	(United States) Kurt DelBene	BRP-BRM	1964	10	+2 laps	
22	34	(Belgium) Guy Peeters	Lotus 18/21	1961	2	+10 laps	
23	10	(United States) Joe Colasacco	Ferrari 1512	1964	1	+11 laps	
No lap	20	(United States) Douglas Mockett	Cooper T53	1961			
DNS	11	(United Kingdom) Frank Sytner	Lotus 24	1962			
DNS	18	(United States) John Delane	Scirocco-BRM	1962			

=== Série E: Pre 1973, Formula 1, 3 litre cars (1966 - 1972) ===
Pos.	No.	Driver	Car	Year	Laps	Time/retired	Grid
1	8	(United States) Duncan Dayton	Brabham BT33	1970	18	32:06.566	22
2	27	(United States) Michael Fitzgerald	March 711	1971	18	+25.250	
3	21	(United Kingdom) Andrew Smith	March 701	1970	18	+1:18.763	1
4	6	(United States) John Delane	Tyrrell 006	1972	18	+1:23.308	
5	3	(United States) Bradley Hoyt	Ferrari 312	1969	18	+1:35.692	
6	11	(Monaco) Roald Goethe	McLaren M14A	1970	17	+1 lap	
7	23	(Italy) Bruno Ferrari	March 701	1970	16	+2 laps	
8	18	(United Kingdom) Robert Lamplough	BRM P180	1972	16	+2 laps	
9	22	(Turkey) Cengiz Artam	March 701	1970	16	+2 laps	
10	7	(United States) John Goodman	Ferrari 312B	1971	16	+2 laps	
11	20	(France) Christophe Caternet	Matra MS120B	1971	16	+2 laps	
12	17	(United States) Chris MacAllister	Lotus 49	1967	16	+2 laps	
13	24	(Italy) Carlo Alberto Steinhauslin	Tecno PA123	1972	16	+2 laps	
14	16	(United States) Graham Adelman	BRM P126	1968	16	+2 laps	
15	10	(United Kingdom) Judith Lyons	Surtees TS9	1971	14	+4 laps	
16	15	(Monaco) Scott Walker	McLaren M19A	1971	11	+7 laps	
17	4	(United Arab Emirates) Fabien Giroix	Brabham BT26	1969	6	+12 laps	
18	25	(Italy) Manfredo Rossi di Montelera	Tecno PA123	1972	4	+14 laps	
No lap		(Spain) Joaquín Folch-Rusiñol	McLaren M19C	1972			
No lap		(United Kingdom) Frank Sytner	March 721G	1972			
DNS		(Belgium) Patrick van Heurck	Brabham BT26	1968			
DNS		(New Zealand) Roger Wills					

=== Série F: Pre 1979 Formula 1, 3 litre cars (1973-1978) ===
Pos.	No.	Driver	Car	Year	Laps	Time/retired	Grid
1	31	(United Kingdom) Michael Lyons	Hesketh 308E	1977	14	28:33.034	1
2	8	(United Kingdom) Bobby Verdon-Roe	McLaren M26	1977	14	+50.240	2
3	26	(Italy) Mauro Pane	Lola T370	1974	14	+1:11.870	
4	19	(United Kingdom) Bob Berridge	Surtees TS16	1974	14	+1:34.139	
5	4	(New Zealand) Roger Wills	Tyrrell P34	1976	14	+1:52.978	
6	28	(United Kingdom) Chris Drake	Penske PC3	1976	14	+1:54.174	
7	40	(United Kingdom) Oliver Hancock	Surtees TS19	1976	13	+1 lap	
8	29	(United Kingdom) Paul Knapfield	Penske PC3	1975	13	+1 lap	
9	41	(United Kingdom) Rob Austin	Surtees TS19	1976	13	+1 lap	
10	18	(Belgium) Hugues Taittinger	Surtees TS16	1974	13	+1 lap	
11	30	(United Kingdom) Ron Maydon	Amon AF101	1974	13	+1 lap	
12	34	(United States) Douglas Mockett	Penske PC4	1976	13	+1 lap	
13	6	(Netherlands) Nico Bindels	Lotus 77	1976	13	+1 lap	
14	3	(Switzerland) Hans Peter	Tyrrell 008	1978	13	+1 lap	
15	25	(Belgium) Christian Vanhee	Token RJ02	1974	13	+1 lap	
16	39	(United Kingdom) Mark Higson	March 761	1976	13	+1 lap	
17	38	(Portugal) Rodrigo Gallego	March 761	1976	12	+2 laps	
18	1	(United Kingdom) Andrew Beaumont	Lotus 76	1974	12	+2 laps	
19	27	(United States) John McKenna	Parnelli VPJ4	1974	12	+2 laps	
20	9	(United States) Charles Nearburg	March 761B	1976	12	+2 laps	
21	37	(United Kingdom) Tommy Dreelan	March 761	1976	12	+2 laps	
22	33	(United Kingdom) Frank Lyons	McLaren M26	1976	12	+2 laps	
23	12	(France) "Mister John of B"	Ferrari 312T	1975	12	+2 laps	
24	15	(United States) Jeffrey Lewis	Tyrrell 007	1974	12	+2 laps	
25	32	(Italy) Luciano Quaggia	Theodore TR1	1978	11	+3 laps	
26	23	(France) Philippe Bonny	Trojan T103	1974	11	+3 laps	
27	22	(United Kingdom) James Hagan	Ensign N177	1977	11	+3 laps	
28	7	(Belgium) Christophe d'Ansembourg	McLaren M26	1976	10	+4 laps	
29	36	(Italy) Cosimo Turizio	Hesketh 308E	1977	2	+12 laps	
No lap	21	(United States) Michael Fitzgerald	Williams FW05	1976			
No lap	24	(United Kingdom) Stuart Hall	Hesketh 308	1975			
Ret	10	(United States) Zak Brown	McLaren M26	1977			
Ret	35	(Spain) Joaquín Folch-Rusiñol	Ferrari 312T3	1978			
DNS	5	(United States) Christopher Locke	Lotus 77	1976			
DNS	11	(Italy) Giancarlo Casoli	Ferrari 312T	1975			
DNS	14	(Monaco) Alain Plasch	Fittipaldi F5A	1977			
DNS	16	(Monaco) Yves Saguato	Shadow DN3	1974			
DNS	17	(United States) Nicholas Colyvas	Shadow DN5	1975			
DNS	20	(United States) Richard Carlino	Hesketh 308C	1975			

=== Série G: Pre 1985 Formula 3, 2000 cc ===
Pos.	No.	Driver	Car	Year	Laps	Time/retired	Grid
1	10	(United Kingdom) Ben Barker	Lola T670	1978	10	17:03.010	1
2	47	(Italy) Matteo Marzotto	Ralt RT3	1984	10	+1.010	3
3	25	(Italy) Paolo Barilla	Martini Mk34	1981	10	+2.697	2
4	32	(Monaco) Marc Faggionato	Martini Mk39	1983	10	+6.591	
5	38	(United Kingdom) David Shaw	Ralt RT1	1978	10	+25.968	
6	31	(Monaco) Grant Tromans	Martini Mk39	1983	10	+47.166	
7	23	(France) Jean-Pierre Eynard-Machet	Martini Mk31	1980	10	+51.570	
8	5	(Sweden) Eje Elgh	Chevron B34	1977	10	+53.165	
9	21	(Monaco) Frédéric Lajoux	Martini Mk34	1981	10	+55.382	
10	6	(United Kingdom) Rob Moores	Chevron B34	1977	10	+56.240	
11	48	(Monaco) Richard Hein	Ralt RT3	1984	10	+58.767	
12	41	(United Kingdom) Sam Hancock	Ralt RT1	1977	10	+1:01.213	
13	3	(France) Pierre Lemasson	Chevron B34	1976	10	+1:01.786	
14	40	(Austria) Roland Wiltschegg	Ralt RT1	1976	10	+1:12.427	
15	36	(Italy) Stefano Rosina	Osella F3A	1976	10	+1:12.657	
16	37	(France) Bo Warmenius	Ralt RT1	1976	10	+1:13.074	
17	28	(France) Éric Martin	Martini Mk37	1982	10	+1:15.400	
18	22	(France) Laurent Vallery-Masson	Martini Mk21B	1978	10	+1:17.141	
19	27	(France) Frédéric Leclerc	Martini Mk37	1982	10	+1:17.776	
20	8	(France) Michel Gendre	Chevron B47B	1979	10	+1:46.641	
21	14	(Monaco) Marcus Mussa	March 743	1974	10	+1:47.479	
22	30	(France) Patrice Lafargue	Martini Mk39	1983	10	+1:49.871	
23	2	(France) Marco Zrihen	Argo JM1	1978	10	+2:28.274	
24	9	(San Marino) Walter Meloni	Dallara 380	1980	10	+2:28.944	
25	12	(United Kingdom) Richard Piper	March 743	1974	10	+2:29.520	
26	34	(United Kingdom) Richard Smeeton	Modus M1	1975	10	+3:34.749	
27	16	(Italy) Valerio Leone	March 783	1978	9	+1 lap	
28	1	(Italy) Pietro Vergnano	Alba AR1F3	1981	9	+1 lap	
29	18	(United Kingdom) Jonathan Price	March 783/793	1978	9	+1 lap	
30	33	(France) Fabrice Porte	Martini Mk39	1983	9	+1 lap	
31	39	(Monaco) Nicolas Minazzoli	Ralt RT1	1976	8	+2 laps	
32	11	(Monaco) Pierre Mare	March 743	1974	8	+2 laps	
33	24	(United Kingdom) Nathan Kinch	Martini Mk34	1981	6	+4 laps	
34	42	(Monaco) Fabrice Notari	Ralt RT3	1983	5	+5 laps	
35	44	(France) Paul Lamic	Ralt RT3	1983	5	+5 laps	
36	43	(United Kingdom) Richard Eyre	Ralt RT3	1982	2	+8 laps	
No lap	15	(Denmark) Palle Ringstrom	March 753	1975			
DNS	17	(United Kingdom) John Clark	March 783	1978			
DNS	45	(Switzerland) Ivan Scotti	Ralt RT3	1983			
