= 1996 Monaco Grand Prix Formula Three =

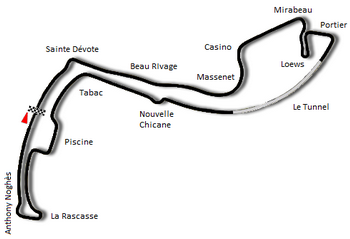
Circuit de Monaco (1986-1996)

The 1996 Monaco Grand Prix Formula Three was a non-championship Formula Three support race held on 18 May 1996 during the Monaco Grand Prix weekend on the 3.328 km Circuit de Monaco. The event attracted a field of young talents from the European Formula Three Championship, including future Formula One drivers such as Nick Heidfeld and Jarno Trulli, and was contested over 24 laps

German driver Marcel Tiemann claimed victory for the Opel Team BSR, driving a Dallara F396-Opel chassis, crossing the line in a time of 38 minutes and 59.161 seconds after a dominant performance

Tiemann beat teammate Arnd Meier to third place, with Dutch driver Tom Coronel finishing second for Prema Powerteam in a Dallara F396-Fiat, just 0.998 seconds behind.

The race saw a chaotic start with five drivers: Paolo Ruberti, Wolf Henzler, Emmanuel Clerico, Davide Campana, and Jeremy Charon. Retiring on the opening lap due to incidents

== Free Practice ==
The practice sessions for the race were scheduled for May 17, 1996, comprising two 30-minute sessions. Dry conditions prevailed throughout, enabling comprehensive testing of car setups without interruption from rain.

Marcel Tiemann emerged as the standout performer, posting consistent lap times that highlighted his familiarity with the street circuit. In contrast, rookies like Nick Heidfeld struggled with adaptation, grappling with the track's narrow margins and elevation changes

Teams prioritized mechanical adjustments, particularly suspension tweaks to mitigate the impact of Monaco's bumps, alongside engine mapping refinements tailored to the low-speed corners. Minor incidents, including spins at the Loews hairpin, occurred but resulted in no major crashes or red flags.

== Qualifying ==
The qualifying session was a 30-minute affair held on May 17, 1996. Italian driver Jarno Trulli claimed pole position for the Opel Team KMS in a Dallara F396-Opel, Argentine Esteban Tuero lined up second in the Coloni Motorsport Dallara F396-Alfa Romeo, marking the debut performance for the 18-year-old in European single-seaters

Further down the order, Dutch driver Tom Coronel qualified third for Prema Powerteam in a Dallara F395-Fiat, while Germany's Arnd Meier took fourth in the Opel Team BSR Dallara F395-Opel, Italian Alessandro Manetti surprised with a top-five grid spot for Supercars CM SRL in a Dallara F396-Alfa Romeo, In contrast, pre-race favorite Nick Heidfeld struggled with setup issues influenced by earlier practice trends, qualifying near the back of the 26-car field for Opel Team BSR in a Dallara F395-Opel

== Race ==
The fastest lap was set by Andrea Boldrini (Shannon Racing Team, Dallara F395-Opel) with a time of 1:34.654 on lap 11

Opel engines powered the dominant constructors, securing the top four positions among classified finishers except for second place, with wins in 1st (Tiemann), 3rd (Meier), 4th (Águas), and 6th (Ayari)

Several drivers were classified despite completing 22 or 23 laps, meeting the event's requirements for official finishing status under Formula 3 regulations at the time

Pos	Driver	Constructor	Laps	Time/Retired
1	(Germany) Marcel Tiemann	Dallara F396-Opel	24	38.59,161
2	(Netherlands) Tom Coronel	Dallara F395-Fiat	24	39.00,159
3	(Germany) Arnd Meier	Dallara F395-Opel	24	39.01,628
4	(Portugal) Rui Águas	Dallara F395-Opel	24	39.06,647
5	(Italy) Alessandro Manetti	Dallara F396-Alfa Romeo	24	39.07,661
6	(France) Soheil Ayari	Dallara F396-Opel	24	39.08,453
7	(France) Anthony Beltoise	Dallara F396-Fiat	24	39.11,739
8	(Italy) Alberto Scilla	Dallara F395-Opel	24	39.23,158
9	(Italy) Oliver Martini	Dallara F395-Fiat	24	39.52,864
10	(Germany) Christian Menzel	Dallara F395-Opel	23	37.34,144
11	(France) Sébastien Mordillo	Dallara F396-Fiat	23	40.37,515
12	(Portugal) André Couto	Dallara F396-Fiat	22	35.47,698
13	(Italy) Andrea Boldrini	Dallara F395-Opel	22	35.50,369
14	(Italy) Michele Gasparini	Dallara F395-Fiat	22	39.17,506
15	(Argentina) Esteban Tuero	Dallara F396-Alfa Romeo	21	34.07,705
16	(Portugal) João Barbosa	Dallara F395-Alfa Romeo	20	32.32,064
17	(Portugal) Manuel Gião	Dallara F396-Opel	19	31.06,066
18	(Italy) Jarno Trulli	Dallara F396-Opel	16	25.57,215
19	(Norway) Tommy Rustad	Dallara F396-Fiat	14	22.50,328
20	(Italy) Gianluca Paglicci	Dallara F396-Opel	2	03:23.729
21	(Germany) Nick Heidfeld	Dallara F395-Opel	2	03.24,157
DNF	(Italy) Paolo Ruberti	Dallara F395-Fiat	0	
DNF	(Germany) Wolf Henzler	Dallara F395-Opel	0	
DNF	(France) Emmanuel Clérico	Dallara F396-Opel	0	
DNF	(Italy) Davide Campana	Dallara F396-Opel	0	
DNF	(United Kingdom) Jeremy Charon	Dallara F396-Fiat	0	
