= 2014 Historic Grand Prix of Monaco =

← Previous race	Next race →
- Circuit de Monaco

Race details
- Date: 9–11 May 2014
- Official name: 9e Grand Prix de Monaco Historique
- Location: Circuit de Monaco
- Course: Street circuit
- Course length: 3.340 km (2.075 miles)

The 2014 Historic Grand Prix of Monaco was the ninth running of the Historic Grand Prix of Monaco, a motor racing event for heritage Grand Prix, Voiturettes, Formula One, Formula Two and Sports cars.

== Report ==
The festivities included demonstrations in the Renault RS01 and RE40 turbocharged F1 cars. They were driven across the weekend by Damon Hill, Alain Prost and Jean-Pierre Jabouille. In addition, Johnny Herbert demonstrated a March 701 and Jacky Ickx took to the wheel of an Auto Union.

Race A was closely fought between the ERA of polesitter Paddins Dowling and the Alfa Romeo Tipo B of Matthew Grist, with Grist winning by a slender margin.

For Race C, Motor Sport journalist Andrew Frankel drove a Jaguar C-Type from England to Monaco and back to compete in the event. The trip was a homage to journalist and racer Tommy Wisdom, who had performed the same journey in 1952 for the only sportscar race held at Monaco; it was done in the same car, chassis XKC005. Frankel wrote about his experiences of the journey and the event in a later magazine column.

In Race D, Joe Colasacco ran strongly in his Ferrari 1512 which had debuted at the previous event in 2012 until he lost second gear.

Race E was a close battle between leader Katsuaki Kubota and second-placed driver Michael Lyons, until Lyons' car developed a misfire and he retired after 10 laps. Second place was eventually taken by Duncan Dayton, with a decisive overtake on Robert Hall at Tabac. The race was red-flagged after a collision between Richard Smeeton and John Goodman.

Michael Lyons cruised to victory in Race F after his main rivals hit trouble: Nathan Kinch crashed in qualifying and front-row qualifier Sam Hancock was relegated to the back after clutch problems on the opening lap. Hancock recovered to seventh by the end of the race. This race was also red-flagged after Kubota crashed at Massenet.

David Shaw qualified on pole for Race G, but jumped the start and was handed a drive-through penalty. The battle for the lead was hotly contested, eventually being settled in favour of Paolo Barilla. A notable car in this race was the MP 301, the only Monégasque car of the weekend. It had been constructed by Société Monégasque de Constructions Automobiles MP, a manufacturer co-founded by Marco Piccinini before he became Team Principal at Scuderia Ferrari.

== Results ==
=== Summary ===
Série	Cars	Years	Pole position		Fastest lap		Race winner
A	Voiturettes and Grand Prix	Pre-war	(Republic of Ireland) Paddins Dowling	1:59.350	(United Kingdom) Matthew Grist	1:59.058	(United Kingdom) Matthew Grist
B	Formula 1 and Formula 2	Pre-1961	(United Kingdom) Tony Wood	1:55.968	(United Kingdom) Robert Hall	1:55.216	(New Zealand) Roger Wills
C	Sports cars	1952-1955	(United Kingdom) Alex Buncombe	1:59.513	(United Kingdom) Alex Buncombe	1:59.920	(United Kingdom) Alex Buncombe
D	Formula 1 - 1500 cm^{3}	1961-1965	(United Kingdom) Andy Middlehurst	1:50.750	(United Kingdom) Andy Middlehurst	1:53.641	(United Kingdom) Andy Middlehurst
E	Formula 1	1966-1972	(Japan) Katsuaki Kubota	1:35.173	(Japan) Katsuaki Kubota	1:35.980	(Japan) Katsuaki Kubota
F	Formula 1 - non ground effect	1973-1978	(United Kingdom) Michael Lyons	1:32.055	(United Kingdom) Michael Lyons	1:33.904	(United Kingdom) Michael Lyons
G	Formula 3 - 2000 cm^{3}	1974-1978	(United Kingdom) David Shaw	1:41.677	(Italy) Paolo Barilla	1:40.900	(Italy) Paolo Barilla

=== Série A: Pre-war Voiturettes and Grand Prix cars ===
Pos.	No.	Driver	Car	Year	Laps	Time/retired	Grid
1	16	(United Kingdom) Matthew Grist	Alfa Romeo P3	1934	10	20:15.898	2
2	28	(Republic of Ireland) Paddins Dowling	ERA B	1936	10	+0.235	1
3	26	(United Kingdom) Nicholas Topliss	ERA A	1935	10	+35.943	4
4	20	(United Kingdom) David Morris	ERA B	1936	10	+38.035	5
5	18	(United Kingdom) Tony Smith	Alfa Romeo P3	1934	9	+1 lap	8
6	6	(Australia) Andrew Cannon	Bugatti 35/51	1927	9	+1 lap	11
7	14	(United Kingdom) Robert Newall	Bugatti 35	1926	9	+1 lap	10
8	12	(United Kingdom) David Hands	Bugatti 39	1925	8	+2 laps	12
9	8	(United Kingdom) Julia de Baldanza	Bugatti 35B	1929	8	+2 laps	13
10	10	(Austria) Martin Halusa	Bugatti 35C	1927	8	+2 laps	9
11	34	(France) Thierry Chanoine	Riley Dobbs	1935	5	+5 laps	6
No lap	24	(Germany) Rainer Ott	ERA B	1936			7
DNS	32	(Australia) Adam Berryman	Bugatti 37A	1928			
DNS	22	(Switzerland) Michael Gans	ERA B	1935			
DNS	2	(United Kingdom) Patrick Blakeney-Edwards	Bugatti 51	1932			
DNS	30	(Switzerland) Jürg König	Bugatti 37A	1926			

=== Série B: Pre–1961 F1 Grand Prix cars and F2 ===
Pos.	No.	Driver	Car	Year	Laps	Time/retired	Grid
1	72	(New Zealand) Roger Wills	Cooper T51	1959	8	15:44.878	2
2	5	(Germany) Frank Stippler	Maserati 250F "Piccolo"	1958	8	+3.827	5
3	22	(United Kingdom) Tony Wood	Tec-Mec 250F	1959	8	+4.250	1
4	78	(United Kingdom) John Chisholm	Lotus 18	1960	8	+4.399	6
5	6	(United Kingdom) Robert Hall	BRM P48	1960	8	+7.306	8
6	8	(United Kingdom) Barrie Baxter	BRM P48	1959	8	+8.442	3
7	66	(United Kingdom) William Nuthall	Cooper T51	1959	8	+15.963	4
8	42	(Spain) Joaquín Folch-Rusiñol	Lotus 18	1959	8	+47.067	7
9	44	(United Kingdom) Ian Nuthall	Alta F2	1952	8	+1:05.576	9
10	52	(Belgium) Paul Grant	Cooper T23 (Mk2)	1953	8	+1:06.336	13
11	32	(United Kingdom) David Wenman	Connaught A	1952	8	+1:06.934	12
12	40	(United Kingdom) Marshall Bailey	Lotus 16	1959	8	+1:09.418	18
13	50	(United Kingdom) Steve Russell	Cooper T23 (Mk2)	1953	8	+1:12.199	14
14	36	(United Kingdom) Eddie McGuire	Cooper T20 (Mk1)	1952	8	+1:12.922	20
15	54	(Netherlands) Adrien van der Kroft	HWM-Alta F2/52	1952	8	+1:27.768	21
16	46	(Italy) Alberto Scuro	Cooper T20 (Mk1)	1952	8	+1:32.333	17
17	60	(United Kingdom) Allan Miles	Cooper T41	1957	8	+1:37.640	16
18	62	(United Kingdom) John Bussey	Cooper T43	1957	8	+1:39.153	15
19	80	(United Kingdom) Timothy Bailey	JBW Type 1	1959	8	+1:39.939	25
20	48	(United Kingdom) Barry Wood	Cooper T20 (Mk1)	1952	8	+1:52.739	22
21	4	(United States) Tom Price	Maserati 250F "Offset"	1956	7	+1 lap	29
22	58	(France) Robert Boos	Cooper T40 Bobtail	1955	7	+1 lap	26
23	2	(Portugal) José Manuel Albuquerque	Maserati 250F	1954	7	+1 lap	19
24	74	(United Kingdom) Paul Griffin	Cooper T51	1959	7	+1 lap	28
25	70	(France) Jean Georges van Praet	Cooper T51	1959	7	+1 lap	27
26	34	(Germany) Helmut Gassmann	Connaught B	1954	7	+1 lap	31
27	68	(Italy) Marco Masini	Cooper T51	1959	7	+1 lap	32
28	28	(United Kingdom) Julia de Baldanza	Maserati A6GCM	1951	7	+1 lap	33
29	14	(France) Jean-Jacques Bally	Gordini T11/15	1946	6	+2 laps	23
30	26	(Germany) Klaus Lehr	Talbot-Lago T26C	1948	6	+2 laps	30
31	16	(France) Eric Leroy	Gordini T11/15	1947	6	+2 laps	34
DNS	20	(United Kingdom) Tony Smith	Ferrari Dino 246	1960			
DNS	56	(United Kingdom) Julian Bronson	Scarab F1	1959			
DNS	10	(Belgium) Marc Valvekens	Gordini T16	1952			

=== Série C: Sports racing cars raced from 1952 to 1955 inclusive ===
Pos.	No.	Driver	Car	Year	Laps	Time/retired	Grid
1	70	(United Kingdom) Alex Buncombe	Jaguar C-Type	1952	10	20:23.912	1
2	28	(United Kingdom) John Ure	Cooper T24	1953	10	+11.091	2
3	66	(United Kingdom) Frederic Wakeman	Cooper T38	1955	10	+1:21.843	6
4	42	(Germany) Michael Willms	Maserati 150S/200S	1955	10	+1:24.691	4
5	44	(France) Nicolas Chambon	Maserati 300S	1955	10	+1:25.754	5
6	88	(United Kingdom) Gavin Pickering	Jaguar D-Type	1955	10	+1:27.955	3
7	10	(United Kingdom) Till Bechtolsheimer	Allard J2	1950	10	+1:49.879	10
8	46	(Switzerland) Conrad Ulrich	Maserati 300S	1955	10	+1:50.329	14
9	62	(United Kingdom) Derek Hood	Cooper T33	1954	10	+1:56.572	8
10	40	(Switzerland) Lukas Huni	Maserati A6GCS	1954	10	+1:57.072	15
11	26	(United Kingdom) Martin Hunt	Frazer Nash Le Mans Replica (Mk2)	1952	10	+1:59.316	7
12	38	(France) Jean-Jacques Bally	Maserati A6GCS	1953	10	+2:01.095	13
13	20	(United Kingdom) James Wood	Frazer Nash Le Mans Replica (Mk1)	1950	10	+2:11.922	11
14	32	(United Kingdom) Tony Wood	Lister-Bristol	1954	10	+2:12.533	12
15	80	(Germany) Wolfgang Friedrichs	Aston Martin DB3S	1954	10	+2:14.017	16
16	34	(United Kingdom) Stephen Bond	Lister Flat Iron	1955	9	+1 lap	18
17	30	(United Kingdom) William Nuthall	Connaught ALSR	1954	9	+1 lap	9
18	50	(United Kingdom) David Franklin	Ferrari 225 S	1952	9	+1 lap	19
19	54	(Italy) Roberto Crippa	Ferrari 340 MM	1953	9	+1 lap	23
20	68	(United Kingdom) Nigel Webb	Jaguar C-Type	1952	9	+1 lap	17
21	36	(Switzerland) Carl Vogele	Maserati A6GCS	1953	9	+1 lap	20
22	16	(United Kingdom) Tim Summers	Frazer Nash Le Mans Replica (Mk1)	1950	9	+1 lap	21
23	12	(United Kingdom) Robert Francis	Allard J2	1951	9	+1 lap	24
24	82	(United Kingdom) Andrew Frankel	Jaguar C-Type	1952	9	+1 lap	22
25	72	(United Kingdom) Alain de Cadenet	Jaguar C-Type	1953	9	+1 lap	26
26	76	(United Kingdom) Martin Melling	Aston Martin DB3	1952	9	+1 lap	28
27	6	(Germany) Lutz Rathenow	Veritas RS2000	1948	9	+1 lap	27
28	52	(Switzerland) Arnold Meier	Ferrari 250 MM	1953	9	+1 lap	32
29	18	(United Kingdom) Gordon McCulloch	Frazer Nash Le Mans Replica (Mk1)	1950	9	+1 lap	29
30	56	(Germany) Michael Roeder	Ferrari 500 Mondial	1955	9	+1 lap	25
31	14	(United States) "Ned" Spieker	Frazer Nash High Speed	1948	9	+1 lap	30
32	24	(United States) John Breslow	Frazer Nash Le Mans Replica (Mk2)	1952	9	+1 lap	31
33	2	(Spain) Carlos de Miguel	OSCA MT4	1949	9	+1 lap	34
34	90	(Ecuador) Diego Ribadeneira	Jaguar D-Type	1955	9	+1 lap	36
35	22	(United Kingdom) Ian Dalglish	Frazer Nash Le Mans Replica (Mk1)	1951	8	+2 laps	33
36	77	(United States) Alan Patterson	Allard J2X	1952	8	+2 laps	37
37	4	(Belgium) Christian Dumolin	Maserati A6GCS	1947	8	+2 laps	35
No lap	48	(United States) Najeeb Khan	Ferrari 225 S	1952			38
No lap	64	(United Kingdom) Vanessa Finburgh	Cooper T33	1954			40
DNS	58	(Spain) Juan Quintano	Ferrari 625 TF	1953			
DNS	8	(United Kingdom) Patrick Watts	Allard J2	1950			
DNS	60	(United Kingdom) Richard Frankel	Ferrari 750 Monza	1955			

=== Série D: 1500cc F1 Grand Prix cars from 1961 to 1965 inclusive ===
Pos.	No.	Driver	Car	Year	Laps	Time/retired	Grid
1	11	(United Kingdom) Andy Middlehurst	Lotus 25	1962	12	23:12.977	1
2	23	(United Kingdom) Sidney Hoole	Cooper T66	1963	12	+39.810	7
3	18	(Italy) Tommaso Gelmini	Scirocco-BRM	1963	12	+45.424	6
4	2	(United Kingdom) Nigel Williams	Lotus 24	1962	12	+53.042	8
5	10	(United Kingdom) Dan Collins	Lotus 21	1961	12	+53.351	4
6	19	(United States) Kurt DelBene	BRP-BRM	1964	12	+1:00.252	12
7	1	(United Kingdom) Roy Walzer	Brabham BT11	1964	12	+1:03.682	14
8	24	(Switzerland) Peter Studer	Lotus 24	1962	12	+1:08.551	11
9	20	(Belgium) Michel Wanty	Lotus 24	1962	12	+1:11.402	10
10	28	(France) "Mister John of B"	Lola Mk4	1962	12	+1:18.901	17
11	8	(United Kingdom) John Elliott	Lotus 18	1961	12	+1:18.937	9
12	14	(United Kingdom) Andrew Beaumont	Lotus 24	1962	12	+1:27.617	5
13	5	(Italy) Federico Buratti	Lotus 21	1961	12	+1:51.577	19
14	32	(Belgium) Guy Peeters	Lotus 18/21	1961	12	+2:03.692	21
15	34	(Germany) Rudolf Ernst	Lotus 18	1961	12	+2:04.809	16
16	21	(France) Franck Trouillard	Lotus 21 AMD	1962	11	+1 lap	20
17	9	(United States) John Romano	Brabham BT11	1964	11	+1 lap	23
18	30	(United Kingdom) Rodger Newman	Brabham BT14	1965	11	+1 lap	24
19	4	(Italy) Marco Cajani	De Tomaso F1	1961	11	+1 lap	22
20	33	(Australia) Scotty Taylor	Lotus 18	1961	11	+1 lap	26
21	7	(United Kingdom) David Clark	BRM P57	1961	8	+4 laps	18
22	31	(United Kingdom) John Evans	Cooper T56	1961	8	+4 laps	28
23	17	(Argentina) Jorge Ferioli	Lola Mk4	1962	5	+7 laps	13
24	6	(Italy) Jason Wright	ATS 100	1964	4	+8 laps	15
25	3	(Luxembourg) Marco Rollinger	Brabham BT3	1962	4	+8 laps	27
26	12	(United States) Joe Colasacco	Ferrari 1512	1964	1	+11 laps	3
27	16	(United States) Charles McCabe	BRM P57	1961	1	+11 laps	25
DNS	15	(United Kingdom) Paul Drayson	Lotus 24	1962			

=== Série E: F1 Grand Prix cars from 1966 to 1972 inclusive ===
Pos.	No.	Driver	Car	Year	Laps	Time/retired	Grid
1	6	(Japan) Katsuaki Kubota	Lotus 72	1971	16	26:13.176	1
2	8	(United States) Duncan Dayton	Brabham BT33	1970	16	+5.224	5
3	20	(United Kingdom) Robert Hall	Matra MS120B	1971	16	+9.589	3
4	9	(United Kingdom) Stuart Hall	Brabham BT26	1969	16	+29.953	6
5	11	(France) Laurent Fort	Surtees TS9B	1972	16	+56.031	7
6	28	(New Zealand) Roger Wills	March 701	1970	16	+1:03.891	8
7	12	(United Kingdom) Max Smith-Hilliard	Surtees TS9B	1971	16	+1:15.609	10
8	14	(Monaco) Scott Walker	Brabham BT37	1972	15	+1 lap	11
9	5	(United Kingdom) Richard Smeeton	March 721G	1972	15	+1 lap	13
10	4	(Monaco) Franco Meiners	Ferrari 312B3	1972	15	+1 lap	14
11	10	(Monaco) Roald Goethe	McLaren M14A	1970	15	+1 lap	15
12	23	(Italy) Bruno Ferrari	March 701	1970	15	+1 lap	12
13	27	(Germany) Rudolf Ernst	March 721	1972	14	+2 laps	17
14	22	(United States) Steven Tillack	De Tomaso FJ 70	1970	14	+2 laps	20
15	17	(United States) Ray Langston	March 711	1971	13	+3 laps	21
16	1	(United States) Richard Griot	Eagle T1F	1966	13	+3 laps	22
17	18	(United Kingdom) Michael Lyons	Surtees TS9	1971	10	+6 laps	2
18	21	(United Kingdom) Andrew Smith	March 701	1970	2	+14 laps	4
19	19	(France) David Ferrer	March 701	1970	2	+14 laps	18
20	15	(Spain) Joaquín Folch-Rusiñol	McLaren M19C	1972	1	+15 laps	9
DNS	3	(United Kingdom) Robert Lamplough	BRM P180	1972			
DNS	24	(Italy) Carlo Alberto Steinhauslin	Tecno PA123	1972			
DNS	2	(United States) Chris MacAllister	Lotus 49	1966			
EX	7	(United States) John Goodman	Ferrari 312B3	1971			

=== Série F: F1 cars, non- ground effects, from 1973 to 1978 inclusive ===
Pos.	No.	Driver	Car	Year	Laps	Time/retired	Grid
1	25	(United Kingdom) Michael Lyons	Hesketh 308E	1977	18	31:25.990	1
2	9	(United States) Charles Nearburg	March 761B	1976	18	+33.675	3
3	20	(United Kingdom) Nick Padmore	Williams FW05	1975	18	+35.932	4
4	18	(Switzerland) Jean-Denis Delétraz	Surtees TS19	1976	18	+54.189	14
5	7	(Belgium) Christophe d'Ansembourg	McLaren M26	1976	18	+1:17.440	8
6	40	(Italy) Manfredo Rossi di Montelera	Brabham BT45	1976	18	+1:17.695	9
7	14	(United Kingdom) Sam Hancock	Fittipaldi F5A	1977	18	+1:17.928	2
8	3	(Switzerland) Hans Peter	Tyrrell 008	1978	18	+1:38.159	12
9	2	(Spain) Joaquín Folch-Rusiñol	McLaren M23	1974	18	+1:38.374	15
10	15	(Monaco) Alain Plasch	Fittipaldi F5A	1977	17	+1 lap	23
11	6	(United Kingdom) Max Smith-Hilliard	Lotus 77	1976	17	+1 lap	7
12	34	(United States) Douglas Mockett	Penske PC4	1976	17	+1 lap	19
13	22	(United Kingdom) James Hagan	Ensign N177	1977	17	+1 lap	18
14	29	(United Kingdom) Andrew Beaumont	Lotus 76	1974	17	+1 lap	16
15	5	(United States) Christopher Locke	Lotus 77	1976	17	+1 lap	13
16	4	(Monaco) Roald Goethe	Tyrrell 007	1974	17	+1 lap	28
17	35	(France) Gregoire Audi	Shadow DN5	1975	17	+1 lap	30
18	28	(United Kingdom) Chris Drake	Penske PC3	1975	17	+1 lap	29
19	17	(Canada) Keith Frieser	Shadow DN1	1973	17	+1 lap	24
20	24	(United Arab Emirates) Frederic Fatien	Hesketh 308	1974	16	+2 laps	31
21	23	(France) Philippe Bonny	Trojan T103	1974	16	+2 laps	26
22	8	(United Kingdom) Frank Lyons	McLaren M26	1976	16	+2 laps	33
23	21	(United States) Richard Carlino	Hesketh 308C	1975	16	+2 laps	27
24	31	(United States) Richard Griot	McLaren M23	1977	16	+2 laps	35
25	10	(Japan) Katsuaki Kubota	March 761	1976	15	+3 laps	6
26	32	(France) Patrick D'Aubreby	March 761	1976	4	+14 laps	5
27	30	(United Kingdom) Ron Maydon	Amon AF101	1974	4	+14 laps	25
28	16	(United States) Nicholas Colyvas	Shadow DN5	1975	3	+15 laps	10
29	36	(Luxembourg) Dany Rollinger	Williams FX3B	1973	3	+15 laps	34
30	37	(France) David Ferrer	Ensign N175	1975	2	+16 laps	20
31	26	(United Kingdom) Mark Higson	March 761	1976	2	+16 laps	21
32	1	(United States) Chris MacAllister	Ferrari 312T2	1976	1	+17 laps	11
33	43	(United States) Zak Brown	McLaren M26	1977	1	+17 laps	17
34	19	(United Kingdom) Mark White	Surtees TS16	1974	1	+17 laps	22
DNS	27	(United Kingdom) Nathan Kinch	Williams FW06	1978			
DNS	42	(France) Guillaume Collinot	Token RJ02	1974			

=== Série G: 2-litre, F3 cars from 1974 to 1978 inclusive ===
Pos.	No.	Driver	Car	Year	Laps	Time/retired	Grid
1	6	(Italy) Paolo Barilla	Chevron B34	1976	18	32:35.182	2
2	48	(Italy) Valerio Leone	March 783	1978	18	+11.664	3
3	32	(United Kingdom) Oliver Hancock	Lola T670	1978	18	+17.103	7
4	62	(Italy) Stefano Rosina	Osella F3A	1976	18	+25.584	9
5	12	(United Kingdom) Tiff Needell	Chevron B38	1977	18	+28.907	4
6	78	(Italy) Maurizio Bianco	Ralt RT1	1978	18	+34.571	8
7	72	(Austria) Roland Wiltschegg	Ralt RT1	1976	18	+39.273	10
8	76	(Monaco) Fabrice Notari	Ralt RT1	1977	18	+44.568	12
9	18	(United Kingdom) Alexander Deighton	Chevron B38	1977	18	+47.220	11
10	26	(Germany) Falk Künster	G.R.D. F3	1973	18	+56.607	21
11	16	(France) Frédéric da Rocha	Chevron B38	1977	18	+59.933	17
12	34	(France) Michel Ghio	Lola T670	1978	18	+1:11.253	29
13	36	(United Kingdom) Richard Eyre	March 743	1974	18	+1:20.783	19
14	54	(France) Jean Legras	Martini Mk21B	1977	18	+1:33.137	14
15	50	(United Kingdom) Richard Dutton	March 783	1978	18	+1:35.072	20
16	52	(United Kingdom) Jonathan Price	March 783/793	1978	18	+1:47.372	28
17	86	(France) "John Doe"	Van Diemen VG376	1976	18	+1:48.077	26
18	38	(United Kingdom) Richard Piper	March 743	1974	17	+1 lap	27
19	74	(United Kingdom) David Clark	Ralt RT1	1977	17	+1 lap	23
20	30	(Italy) Marco Fumagalli	G.R.D. 373	1973	17	+1 lap	24
21	44	(Italy) Piero Lottini	March 763	1976	17	+1 lap	32
22	66	(United Kingdom) Michael Richings	Ralt RT1	1975	17	+1 lap	37
23	14	(United Kingdom) Hugh Price	Chevron B38	1977	16	+2 laps	13
24	82	(United Kingdom) James Timms	Ralt RT1	1978	16	+2 laps	33
25	28	(Denmark) Povl Barfod	G.R.D. 373	1973	16	+2 laps	34
26	80	(Switzerland) Giacomo Talleri	Ralt RT1	1977	16	+2 laps	36
27	68	(United Kingdom) Leif Bosson	Ralt RT1	1976	16	+2 laps	38
28	20	(United States) Tupper Robinson	Chevron B38	1977	16	+2 laps	39
29	64	(Italy) Angela Grasso	Ralt RT1	1975	15	+3 laps	40
30	10	(United Kingdom) Nick Taylor	Chevron B38	1977	15	+3 laps	31
31	84	(United Kingdom) David Shaw	Ralt RT1	1978	11	+7 laps	1
32	8	(Argentina) Federico Ferioli	Chevron B34	1976	7	+11 laps	25
33	46	(Italy) Stefano Garzi	March 773	1977	6	+12 laps	22
34	24	(Monaco) Marc Faggionato	Chevron B43	1978	5	+13 laps	5
35	58	(Monaco) Andrea Giuliani	Modus M1	1975	4	+14 laps	35
36	22	(Monaco) Frédéric Lajoux	Chevron B43	1978	1	+17 laps	6
No lap	2	(France) Marco Gian	Argo JM1	1978			18
No lap	40	(Monaco) Marcus Mussa	March 763	1976			16
DNS	56	(United Kingdom) Richard Smeeton	Modus M1	1975			
DNS	70	(Germany) Peter Hug	Ralt RT1	1976			
DNS	60	(Italy) Pietro Silva	MP 301	1974			
