= Pasquale Lattuneddu =

Italian businessman

Pasquale Lattuneddu (born 12 August 1956 in Tempio Pausania, Sardinia) is an Italian businessman and former Chief of Operations of the Formula One Group (FOM). He worked in Formula One until Liberty Media's acquisition of FOM in January 2017.

Lattuneddu worked in a pizzeria run by one of his brothers in Sassari until 1982, when he decided to move to London. He worked as a barista in a club frequented by businessmen, but then got a chance to work for Gerald Metals and then for the Italian press agency ANSA. In 1980 his acquaintance Slavica Radić introduced him to her husband, Bernie Ecclestone, who hired him to work at FOM. Over the years Lattuneddu worked his way upwards through the organization, effectively becoming Ecclestone's right-hand man, Lattuneddu was pivotal in the day-to-day operations of the paddock and the timings and fluency of procedures on race days. His rigour on the job earned him the nickname 'The Paddock's Policeman'.

In 2015, he was named as the 20th most influential person in Formula One. Following Liberty Media's acquisition of Formula One, Latteneddu retired from the sport. In most recent years, he worked as media consultant and chief strategist for the Rally Italia Sardegna.
