= Alex Buncombe =

British racing driver (born 1981)

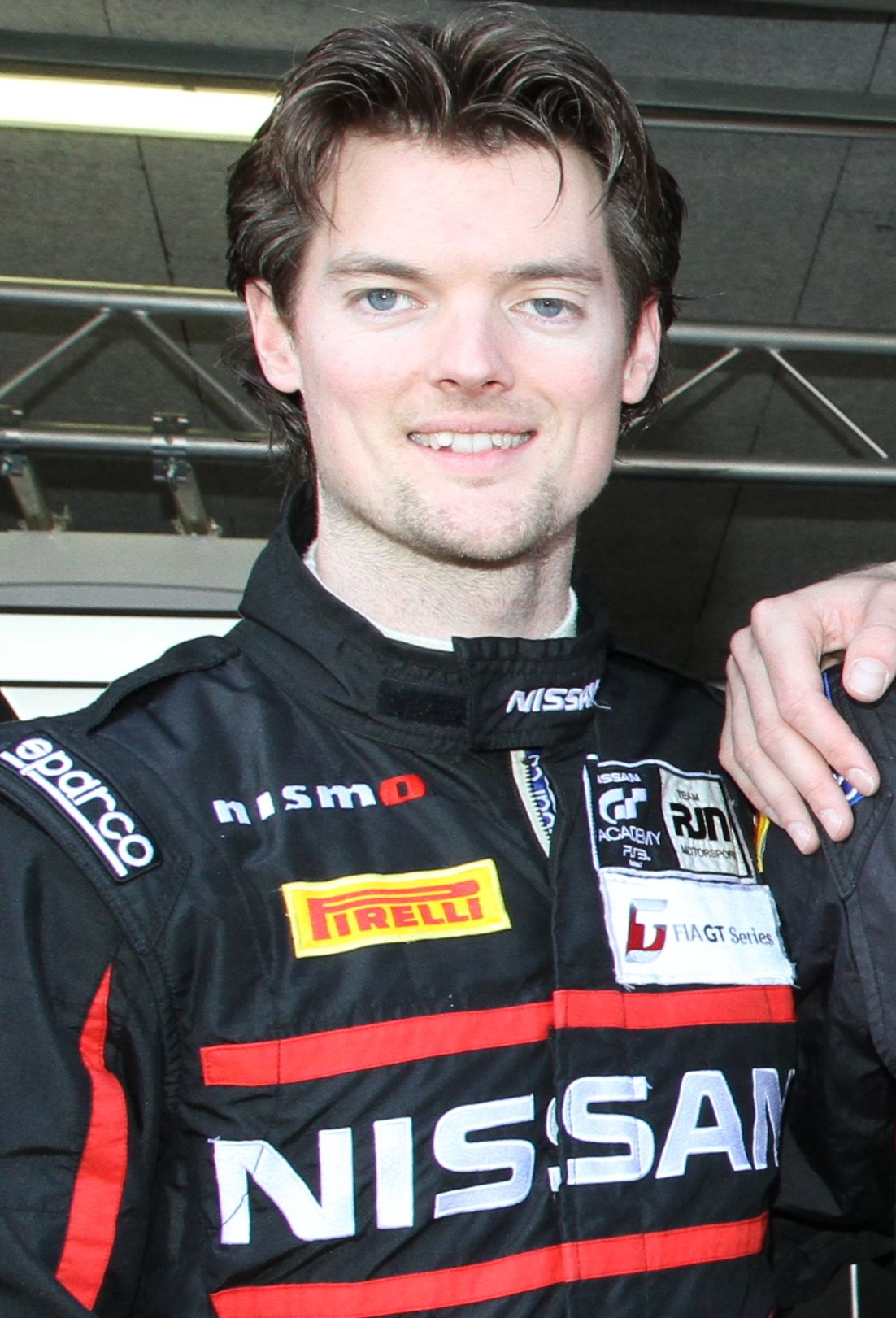
- Buncombe in 2013
- Nationality: (United Kingdom) British
- Born: Alexander John Buncombe; 28 August 1981 (age 45) Taunton, England
- Relatives: Chris Buncombe (brother)
- Categorisation: FIA Silver (until 2013); FIA Gold (2014–)

Alexander John Buncombe (born 28 August 1981 in Taunton, England) is a British racing driver. He is a part of the Nismo Global Driver Exchange. He is the brother of Chris Buncombe and the son of former BTCC racer Jonathan Buncombe.

== Career ==
Buncombe competed in the British Formula Renault Championship from 2001 to 2003, finishing fifth in the 2003 Winter Series. He took part in his first GT race in 2005, competing in the Trofeo Maserati. He won his first race in the series, at Monza, by thirty-five seconds. From 2007 to 2011, Buncombe competed in the GT4 European Series for RJN Motorsport. He finished third in 2007 before finishing as runner-up in 2008 and 2009. He continued to drive in the series until 2011. In total he scored five pole positions and ten wins.

Buncombe has competed in the Blancpain Endurance Series since 2011, winning the GT4 Cup class that season along with Jordan Tresson and Christopher Ward. The GT4 Cup class was removed from the series the following year and Buncombe moved into the GT3 Pro-Am Cup class. Buncombe has scored two wins and recorded a best season finish of fourth in 2013.

Buncombe has taken part in various endurance races since 2008, including the Bathurst 12 Hour and the Dubai, Nürburgring, Silverstone and Spa 24 hour races.

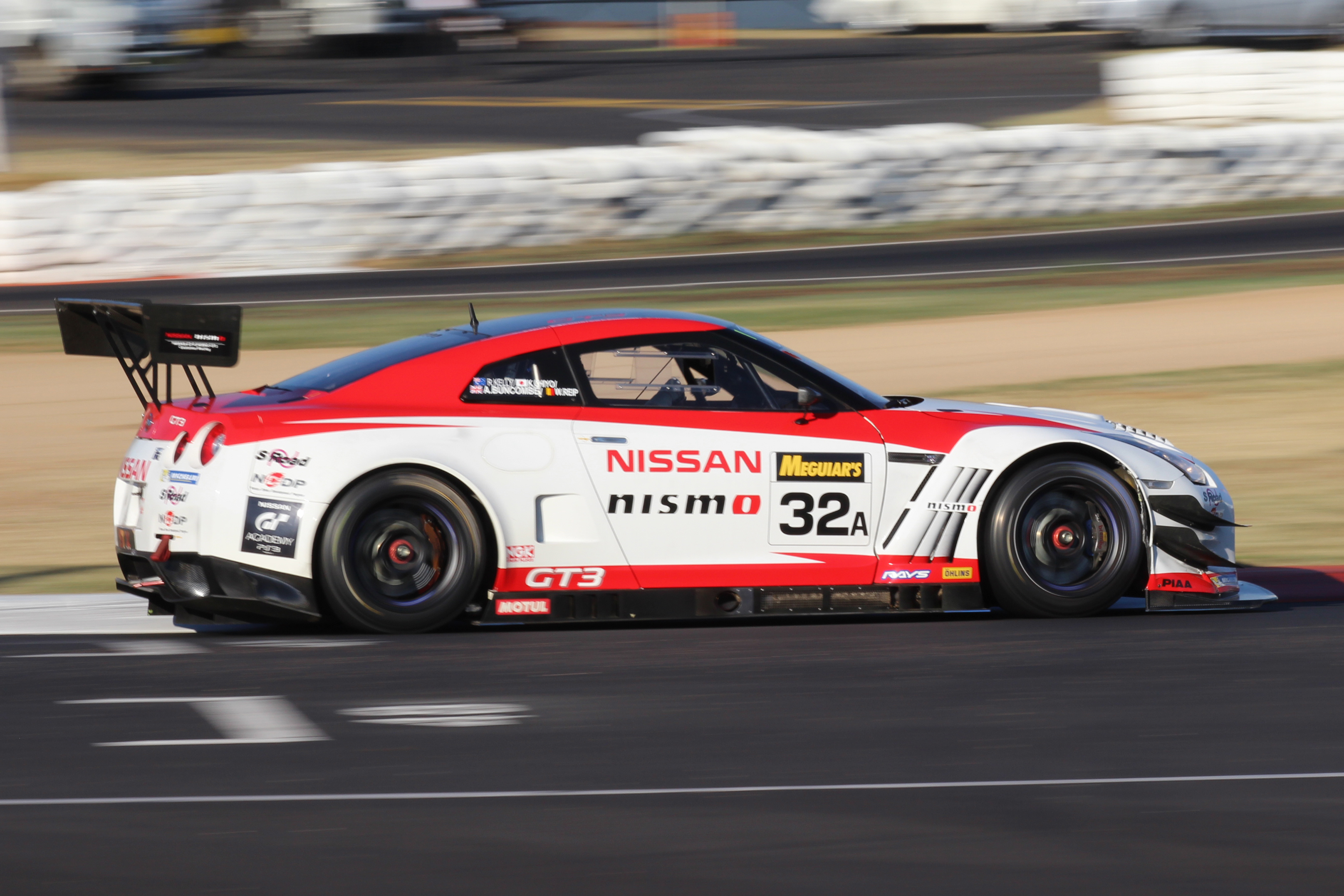
The Nissan GT-R of Buncombe, Chiyo, Kelly and Reip at the 2014 Bathurst 12 Hour.

=== Australia ===
Buncombe competed in the 2014 Bathurst 12 Hour as part of the Nismo Global Driver Exchange, driving a Nissan GT-R Nismo GT3 with Katsumasa Chiyo, Rick Kelly and Wolfgang Reip. Chiyo was involved in a crash in the early stages of the race, ending the team's chances after 58 laps. Buncombe was scheduled to return to the race for 2015, but was forced to withdraw due to the impending birth of his first child.

Following the 2014 Bathurst 12 Hour, Buncombe joined Nissan's V8 Supercar team as a co-driver for Todd Kelly in the 2014 Endurance Cup. The pair finished twentieth at the Sandown 500 before recording a creditable seventh-place finish at the Bathurst 1000.

== Racing record ==
=== Career summary ===
Season	Series	Team	Races	Wins	Poles	F/Laps	Podiums	Points	Position
2001	Formula Renault 2.0 UK Championship	Aztec International	8	0	0	0	0	54	23rd
2002	Formula Renault 2.0 UK Championship	Saxon International	4	0	0	0	0	13	29th
2003	Formula Renault 2.0 UK Winter Series	Falcon Motorsport	4	0	0	0	2	44	5th
2007	GT4 European Cup	RJN Motorsport	4	2	1	3	4	36	3rd
2007	FIA GT3 European Championship	Trackspeed Racing	2	0	0	0	0	2	19th
2008	GT4 European Cup	RJN Motorsport	12	5	3	6	9	88	2nd
2008	24 Hours of Nürburgring - SP6	RJN Motorsport	1	0	0	0	0	N/A	4th
2009	GT4 European Cup	RJN Motorsport	12	2	1	2	6	57	2nd
2010	GT4 European Cup	RJN Motorsport	8	0	0	2	1	21	7th
2010	24 Hours of Nürburgring - SP7	RJN Motorsport	1	0	0	0	0	N/A	10th
2011	Blancpain Endurance Series - GT4	RJN Motorsport	5	2	1	0	4	116	1st
2011	GT4 European Cup	RJN Motorsport	3	1	?	?	?	?	?
2011	24 Hours of Nürburgring - SP10	RJN Motorsport	1	0	0	0	0	N/A	6th
2012	British GT Championship - GT3	RJN Motorsport	10	1	0	0	3	108.5	6th
2012	Blancpain Endurance Series - Pro-Am	GT Academy Team RJN	4	0	0	0	0	0	NC
2012	European Le Mans Series - LMP2	Greaves Motorsport	1	0	0	0	1	30	6th
2012	Historic Grand Prix of Monaco - Series C	Jaguar Cars	1	1	1	1	1	N/A	1st
2013	Blancpain Endurance Series - Pro-Am	Nissan GT Academy Team RJN	5	1	0	0	2	53	4th
2013	FIA GT Series - Pro-Am	Nissan GT Academy Team RJN	10	0	0	2	4	70	7th
2013	FFSA GT Championship	JMB Racing	2	0	0	0	0	2	28th
2013	Le Mans Legend	JD Classics	1	1	1	0	1	N/A	1st
2014	British GT Championship - GT3	Nissan GT Academy Team RJN	4	0	0	0	0	11	33rd
2014	Blancpain Endurance Series - Pro-Am	Nissan GT Academy Team RJN	5	1	0	0	1	38	8th
2014	24 Hours of Nürburgring - SP9	Nissan GT Academy Team RJN	1	0	0	0	0	N/A	13th
2014	International V8 Supercars Championship	Nissan Motorsport	4	0	0	0	0	330	41st
2014	Historic Grand Prix of Monaco - Series C	Jaguar Cars	1	1	1	1	1	N/A	1st
2015	Blancpain Endurance Series - Pro	Nissan GT Academy Team RJN	5	1	1	0	1	62	1st
2015	24 Hours of Nürburgring - SP9	Nissan GT Academy Team RJN	1	0	0	0	0	N/A	9th
2015	International V8 Supercars Championship	Nissan Motorsport	4	0	0	0	0	276	47th
2015	FIA World Endurance Championship	Nissan Motorsports	1	0	0	0	0	0	NC
2015	24 Hours of Le Mans	Nissan Motorsports	1	0	0	0	0	N/A	NC
2016	Blancpain GT Series Endurance Cup	Nissan GT Academy Team RJN	5	0	0	0	1	39	9th
2016	Blancpain GT Series Sprint Cup	Nissan GT Academy Team RJN	10	0	0	0	0	0	NC
2016	24 Hours of Nürburgring - SP9	Nissan GT Academy Team RJN	1	0	0	0	0	N/A	11th
2017	Blancpain GT Series Endurance Cup	Motul Team RJN Nissan	5	0	0	0	0	12	23rd
2017	Intercontinental GT Challenge	Nissan Motorsport	1	0	0	0	0	0	NC
2017	Intercontinental GT Challenge	Motul Team RJN Nissan	1	0	0	0	0	0	NC
2018	Blancpain GT Series Endurance Cup	GT SPORT MOTUL Team RJN	5	0	0	0	0	21	22nd
2019	Blancpain GT Series Endurance Cup	Bentley Team M-Sport	3	0	0	0	0	8	27th
2019	Intercontinental GT Challenge	KCMG	1	0	0	1	0	0	NC
2019	Intercontinental GT Challenge	Bentley Team M-Sport	2	0	0	1	0	0	NC
2020	GT World Challenge Europe Endurance Cup	Bentley K-PAX Racing	1	0	0	0	0	9	17th
2020	Intercontinental GT Challenge	Bentley Team M-Sport	2	0	0	0	0	2	20th
2024	British GT Championship - GT3	Team RJN	5	1	1	0	1	12	18th
2024	GT World Challenge Europe Endurance Cup	Team RJN	1	0	0	0	0	0	NC
2025	GT World Challenge Europe Endurance Cup	Team RJN	5	0	0	0	0	0	NC

^{*} Season still in progress.

=== Complete FIA GT Series results ===
Year	Team	Car	Class	1	2	3	4	5	6	7	8	9	10	11	12	Pos.	Points
2013	RJN Motorsport	Nissan GT-R Nismo GT3	Pro-Am	NOG; QR; 19	NOG; CR; 7	ZOL; QR; 18	ZOL; CR; Ret	ZAN; QR; 13	ZAN; QR; 8	SVK; QR; 12	SVK; CR; 8	NAV; QR; 13	NAV; CR; 11	BAK; QR	BAK; CR	7th	70

=== Complete Blancpain GT Series Sprint Cup results ===
Year	Team	Car	Class	1	2	3	4	5	6	7	8	9	10	Pos.	Points
2016	Nissan GT Academy Team RJN	Nissan GT-R Nismo GT3	Pro	MIS; QR; 17	MIS; CR; 14	BRH; QR; 21	BRH; CR; 18	NÜR; QR; 16	NÜR; CR; 14	HUN; QR; 20	HUN; CR; 18	CAT; QR; 9	CAT; CR; 11	NC	0

=== Complete British GT Championship results ===
Year	Team	Car	Class	1	2	3	4	5	6	7	8	9	10	DC	Points
2012	RJN Motorsport	Nissan GT-R Nismo GT3	GT3	OUL; 1; 5	OUL; 2; 11	NUR; 1; 3	NUR; 2; 5	ROC; 1; 5	BRH; 1; 1	SNE; 1 Ret	SNE; 2; 3	SIL; 1; 8	DON; 1; 16	6th	108.5
2014	RJN Motorsport	Nissan GT-R Nismo GT3	GT3	OUL; 1; 9	OUL; 2; 13	ROC; 1; 13	SIL; 1; 7	SNE; 1	SNE; 2	SPA; 1	SPA; 2	BRH; 1	DON; 1	33rd	11
2024	Team RJN	McLaren 720S GT3 Evo	GT3	OUL; 1; 8	OUL; 2; 6	SIL; 1 WD	DON; 1 Ret	SPA; 1; 29	SNE; 1	SNE; 2	DON; 1	BRH; 1; 1†		18th	12

^{†} As Buncombe was a guest driver, he was ineligible for points.

=== 24 Hours of Le Mans results ===
Year	Team	Co-drivers	Car	Class	Laps	Pos.	Class pos.
2015	(Japan) Nissan Motorsports	(United Kingdom) Harry Tincknell (Germany) Michael Krumm	Nissan GT-R LM Nismo	LMP1	242	NC	NC

=== Supercar results ===
Year	Team	Car	1	2	3	4	5	6	7	8	9	10	11	12	13	14	15	16	17	18	19	20	21	22	23	24	25	26	27	28	29	30	31	32	33	34	35	36	37	38	Final pos	Points
2014	Nissan Motorsport	Nissan Altima	ADE; R1	ADE; R2	ADE; R3	SYM; R4	SYM; R5	SYM; R6	WIN; R7	WIN; R8	WIN; R9	PUK; R10	PUK; R11	PUK; R12	PUK; R13	BAR; R14	BAR; R15	BAR; R16	HID; R17	HID; R18	HID; R19	TOW; R20	TOW; R21	TOW; R22	QLD; R23	QLD; R24	QLD; R25	SMP; R26	SMP; R27	SMP; R28	SAN; R29; 20	BAT; R30; 7	SUR; R31; Ret	SUR; R32; 19	PHI; R33	PHI; R34	PHI; R35	SYD; R36	SYD; R37	SYD; R38	41st	330
2015	Nissan Motorsport	Nissan Altima	ADE; R1	ADE; R2	ADE; R3	SYM; R4	SYM; R5	SYM; R6	BAR; R7	BAR; R8	BAR; R9	WIN; R10	WIN; R11	WIN; R12	HID; R13	HID; R14	HID; R15	TOW; R16	TOW; R17	QLD; R18	QLD; R19	QLD; R20	SMP; R21	SMP; R22	SMP; R23	SAN; R24; 24	BAT; R25; 20	SUR; R26; 13	SUR; R27; 17	PUK; R28	PUK; R29	PUK; R30	PHI; R31	PHI; R32	PHI; R33	SYD; R34	SYD; R35	SYD; R36			47th	276

=== Bathurst 1000 results ===
Year	Team	Car	Co-driver	Position	Laps
2014	Nissan Motorsport	Nissan Altima L33	(Australia) Todd Kelly	7th	161
2015	Nissan Motorsport	Nissan Altima L33	(Australia) Todd Kelly	20th	156

=== Britcar 24 Hour results ===
Year	Team	Co-drivers	Car	Car No.	Class	Laps	Pos.	Class pos.
2007	(United Kingdom) RJN Motorsport	(United Kingdom) Owen Mildenhall (United Kingdom) Anthony Reid (Denmark) Kurt Thiim	Nissan 350Z	40	GTC	50	23rd	8th
2011	(United Kingdom) RJN Motorsport	(United Kingdom) Jann Mardenborough (United Kingdom) Christopher Ward (United States) Bryan Heitkotter	Nissan 370Z	31	2	50	DNF	DNF

Sporting positions
Preceded by Laurens Vanthoor	Blancpain Endurance Series; Champion; 2015; With: Katsumasa Chiyo and Wolfgang Reip	Succeeded by Rob Bell; Côme Ledogar
