= Lotus 76 =

Lotus 76 (John Player Special Mk.I)
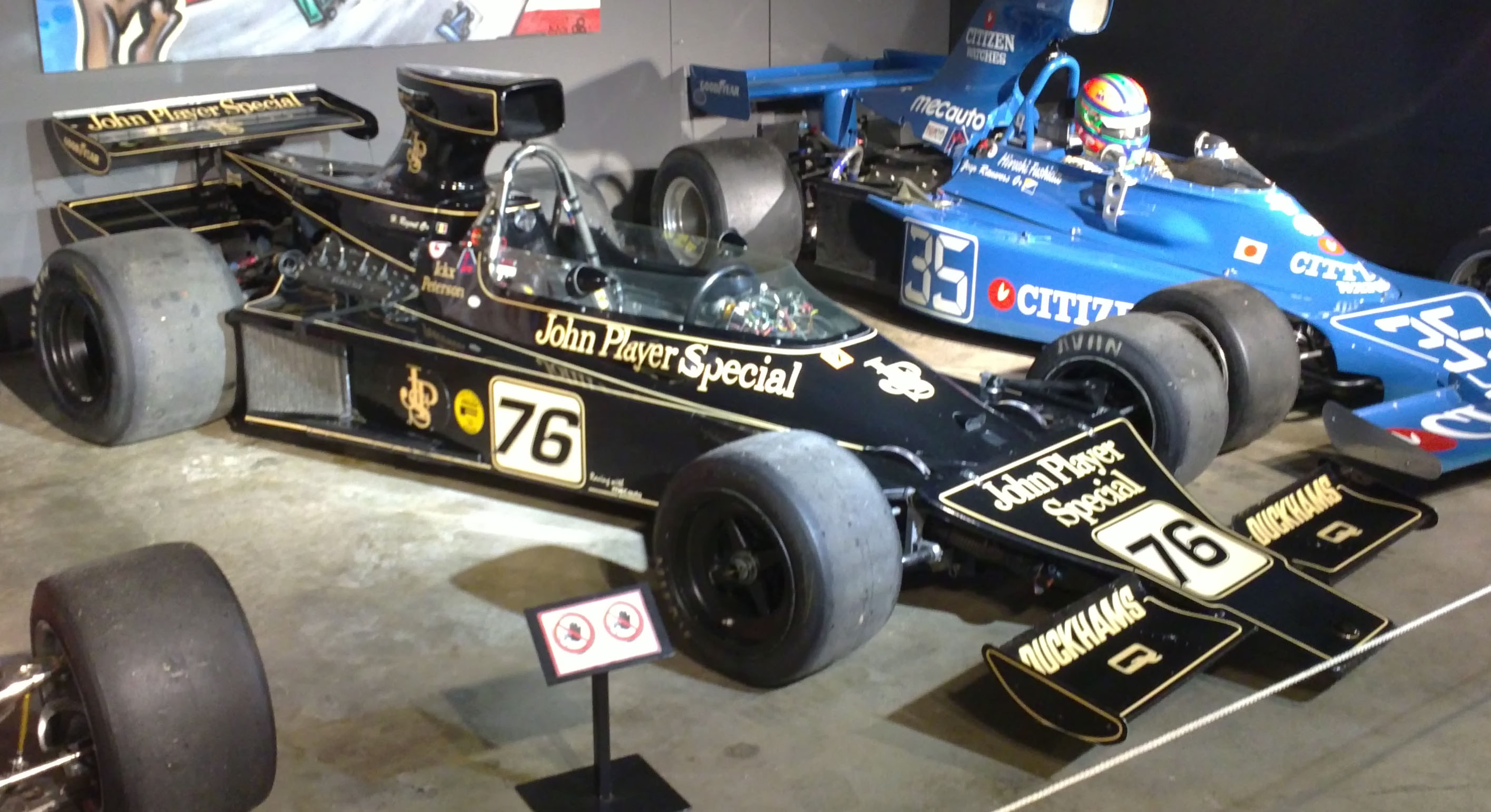
- The Lotus 76
- Constructor: Team Lotus
- Designers: Colin Chapman (technical director); Ralph Bellamy (chief designer)
- Predecessor: Lotus 72
- Successor: Lotus 77

Technical specifications
- Axle track: 1,473 mm (58.0 in) front, 1,575 mm (62.0 in) rear
- Wheelbase: 2,565 mm (101.0 in)
- Engine: Ford Cosworth DFV 2,993 cc (182.6 cu in) V8, NA, mid-mounted
- Transmission: Hewland-Lotus 5-speed manual gearbox
- Weight: 578 kg (1,274 lb)
- Fuel: Duckhams
- Tyres: Goodyear

Competition history
- Notable entrants: John Player Team Lotus
- Notable drivers: (Sweden) Ronnie Peterson (Belgium) Jacky Ickx
- Debut: 1974 South African Grand Prix
- Last event: 1974 United States Grand Prix
Races	Wins	Podiums	Poles	F/Laps
7	0	0	0	0
- Unless otherwise stated, all data refer to Formula One World Championship Grands Prix only.

The Lotus 76 is a Formula One car designed by Colin Chapman, Tony Rudd and Ralph Bellamy and used by Team Lotus in the 1974 Formula One season.

== Development ==
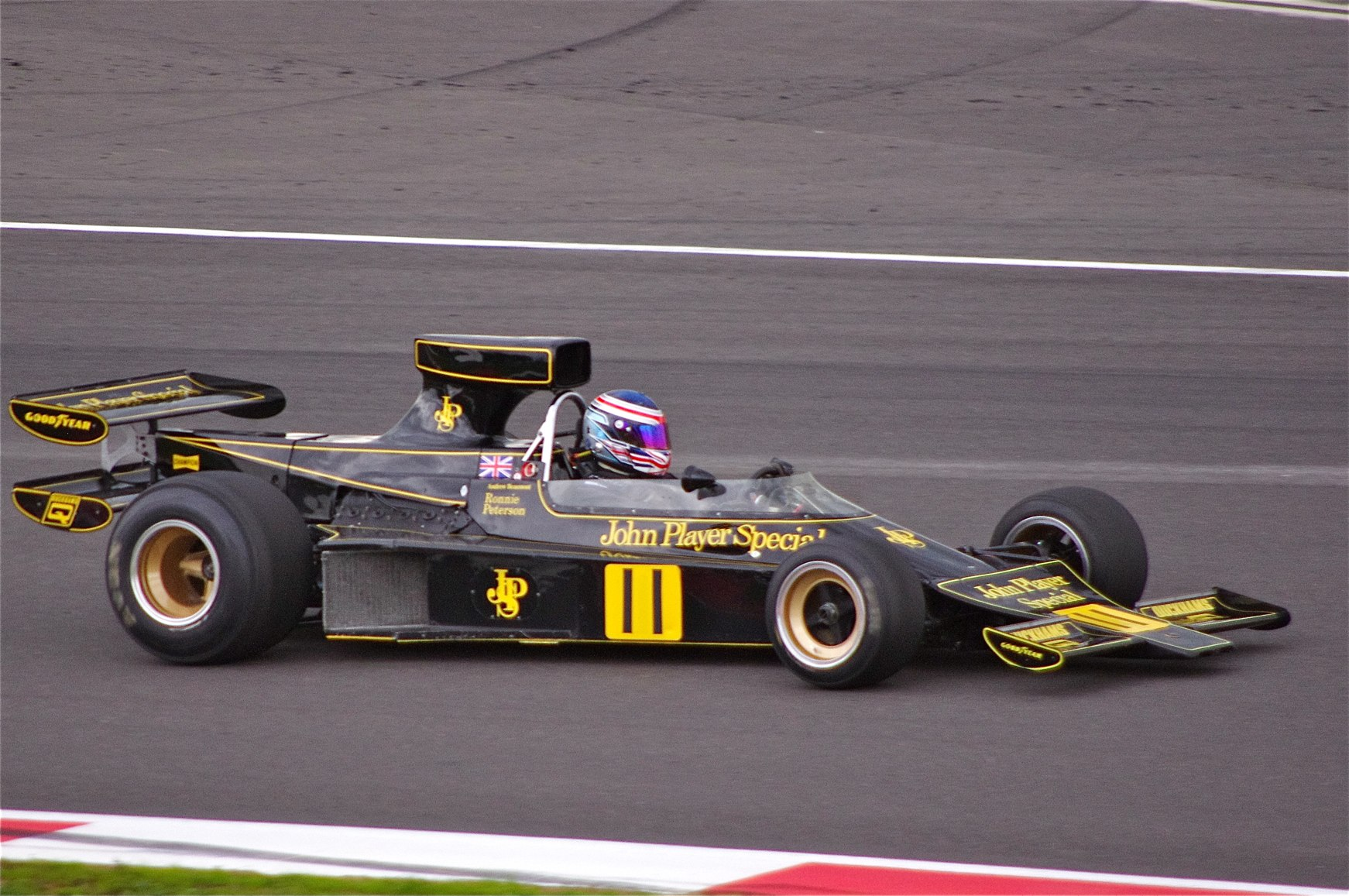
Side view of the Lotus 76, showing the bi-plane rear wing.

The 76 was intended to be a more advanced version of the Lotus 72, powered by the Ford Cosworth DFV and featuring modified aerodynamics, a lighter chassis, longer wheelbase and a narrower, lower monocoque. The car also featured a bi-plane rear wing, designed to increase rear downforce and stability. Additionally, it had four pedals and an electronically operated clutch, which was the precursor to the modern semi-automatic gearboxes seen on today's F1 cars, with the control mounted into the gearstick which theoretically speeded up gear changes. The 76 was seen as a major technological breakthrough by Lotus. Outwardly, the car looked sleek and impressive. Internally, the suspension set up and inboard brake positioning were carried over from the 72. The car's development had been paid for by its title sponsor John Player Special, so the 76 was designated the "John Player Special Mk I".

After initial tests by Ronnie Peterson and Jacky Ickx, both drivers complained that the car lacked 'feel' and that the electronic clutch was giving problems. The gearchange was modified, but both drivers persisted in claiming it was no better than the conventional clutch setup. Other problems with the engine installation were encountered, which led to mechanical failures and the car's weight bias being out of sync.

== Racing history ==
After the 72 was used at the first two races of the 1974 World Championship, the 76 made its debut at the South African Grand Prix. Ickx qualified 10th and Peterson 16th, before a disastrous race saw the two collide early on, Peterson retiring immediately and Ickx eventually succumbing to brake failure. The Spanish Grand Prix was more promising, Peterson qualifying second and Ickx fifth, and the Swede leading until his engine overheated, while Ickx also ran strongly before suffering another brake failure. Then, at the Belgian Grand Prix, Peterson qualified fifth before retiring with a fuel leak, while in his home race Ickx could only qualify 16th before his engine overheated. Afterwards, both drivers insisted on going back to the 72, with which Peterson won in Monaco and France.

Chapman responded by upgrading the 76 to 'B' specification, with enlarged sidepods and better cooling. The revised car first appeared at the German Grand Prix, Peterson qualifying eighth and finishing fourth, just ahead of Ickx in the 72. Peterson then drove the 72 in the Austrian and Italian Grands Prix (winning the latter), leaving Ickx to drive the 76 in these races: the Belgian could only qualify 22nd in Austria and retired after a collision with Patrick Depailler's Tyrrell, while in Italy he qualified 16th before retiring with a broken throttle linkage.

Both drivers then used the 72 for the final two races of the season, though the 76 was given one last drive in the United States Grand Prix, when Lotus made a third entry for Tim Schenken. The Australian driver failed to qualify, but nonetheless started the race, completing six laps before being disqualified.

The team eventually had to accept that the 76 was a step in the wrong direction, and the whole project was scrapped in favour of keeping the 72 competitive. The 72 would go on to be used throughout the 1975 season.

== Complete Formula One World Championship results ==
(key)

Year	Entrant	Engine	Tyres	Drivers	1	2	3	4	5	6	7	8	9	10	11	12	13	14	15	Points	WCC
1974	John Player Team Lotus	Ford Cosworth DFV	G		ARG	BRA	RSA	ESP	BEL	MON	SWE	NED	FRA	GBR	GER	AUT	ITA	CAN	USA	42^{1}	4th
1974	John Player Team Lotus	Ford Cosworth DFV	G	Ronnie Peterson			Ret	Ret	Ret						4					42^{1}	4th
1974	John Player Team Lotus	Ford Cosworth DFV	G	Jacky Ickx			Ret	Ret	Ret							Ret	Ret			42^{1}	4th
1974	John Player Team Lotus	Ford Cosworth DFV	G	Tim Schenken															DSQ	42^{1}	4th

^1 39 points scored using the Lotus 72.

== Non-Championship results ==
(key)

Year	Entrant	Engine	Tyres	Driver	1	2	3
1974	John Player Team Lotus	Ford Cosworth DFV	G		PRE	ROC	INT
1974	John Player Team Lotus	Ford Cosworth DFV	G	Ronnie Peterson			Ret
