= The Tobacconist =

The Tobacconist may refer to:

- The Tobacconist (magazine), a trade paper published by J. Finzer and Brothers Company
- The Tobacconist (play), a 1771 play by Francis Gentleman
- The Tobacconist (film), a 2018 German film originally named Der Trafikant (de) based on a book with the same name.

== See also ==
- Tobacconist, a tobacco merchant
