= Lotus 77 =

Lotus 77 (John Player Special Mk.II)
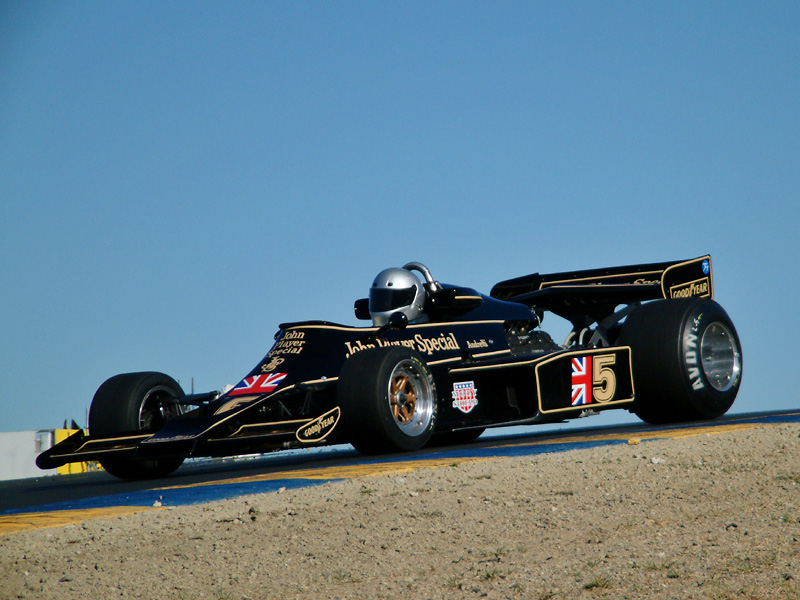
- The Lotus 77 on the Sears Point Raceway
- Category: Formula One
- Constructor: Team Lotus
- Designer(s): Colin Chapman; Geoff Aldridge; Martin Ogilvie
- Predecessor: 72 / 76
- Successor: 78

Technical specifications
- Chassis: Aluminium monocoque
- Suspension (front): Lower wishbone, top rocker
- Suspension (rear): Single lower link with double, parallel upper; twin radius rods
- Engine: Ford-Cosworth DFV 2993cc V8, naturally aspirated, mid-mounted
- Transmission: Hewland FG400 5-speed manual
- Power: 465 hp (347 kW) @ 10,800 rpm 260 lb⋅ft (350 N⋅m) torque
- Tyres: Goodyear

Competition history
- Notable entrants: John Player Team Lotus
- Notable drivers: 5. (Sweden) Ronnie Peterson; 5. (United Kingdom) Bob Evans; 5./6. (United States) Mario Andretti; 6. (Sweden) Gunnar Nilsson
- Debut: 1976 Brazilian Grand Prix
- First win: 1976 Japanese Grand Prix
- Last win: 1976 Japanese Grand Prix
- Last event: 1976 Japanese Grand Prix
Races	Wins	Podiums	Poles	F/Laps
16	1	5	1	1
- Constructors' Championships: 0
- Drivers' Championships: 0

The Lotus 77 was a Formula One racing car designed by Colin Chapman, Geoff Aldridge and Martin Ogilvie for the 1976 Formula One season.

The car was a stop-gap means to an end for Lotus, who were fighting back after the failure of the Lotus 76 and the obsolescence of the Lotus 72 in 1975. Three chassis were built and, as of 2018, all are still in existence.

== Design and development ==
The Lotus 77 featured a slimmer, lighter monocoque design over the 72, but was similarly powered by the Cosworth DFV. It featured improved aerodynamics and repositioned radiators to aid better cooling. The front brakes were initially inboard, in line with its predecessors, but were moved outboard in a more conventional design part-way through the season. The suspension was designed around a series of rocker arms instead of the usual set up of wishbones. The idea behind the new system was to set the suspension up for a specific track, taking into account ride height and road surface, and the 77 was dubbed 'The Adjustacar' as a result. It worked in a fashion, but inexperience with such an infinitely adjustable car meant that optimum settings were often not achieved.

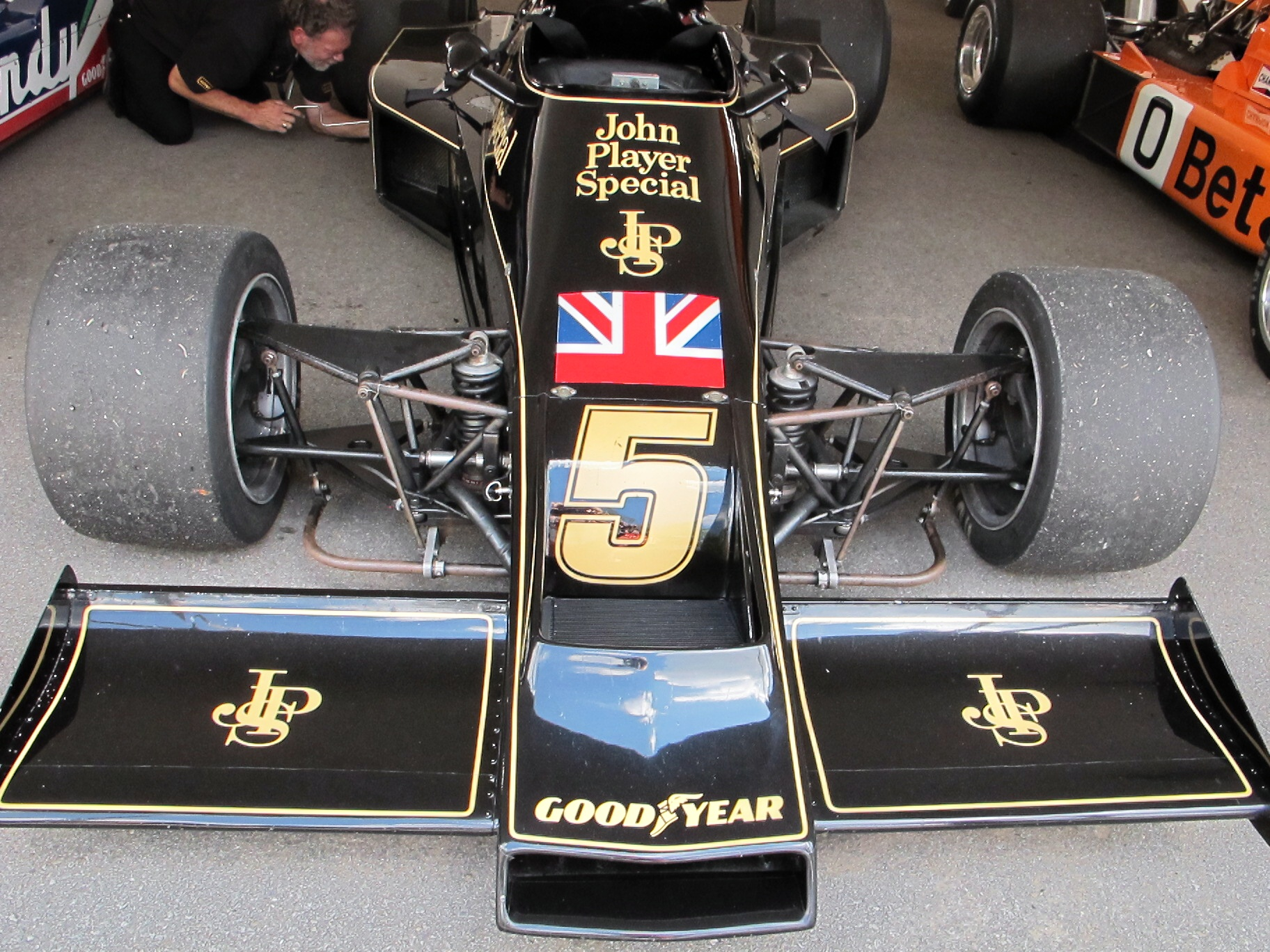
Front end of the Lotus 77

It was quickly deemed that this suspension arrangement wasn't suitable and Len Terry was brought in to design a more orthodox system with rocker arms and outboard brakes. Later in the season Lotus hired Tony Southgate from Shadow to act as chief engineer. He moved the oil radiator to the nose to improve weight distribution and also added a cockpit-adjustable rear anti-roll bar and a lighter compressed-air starter.

All drivers reported the steering and ride were occasionally vague and unresponsive and that the car lacked straight-line speed. Andretti did not care for the car, proclaiming it to be a 'dog'. This motivated Lotus to accelerate research and create the Lotus 78.

== Racing history ==
Andretti skipped the Monaco Grand Prix to race in the Indianapolis 500.

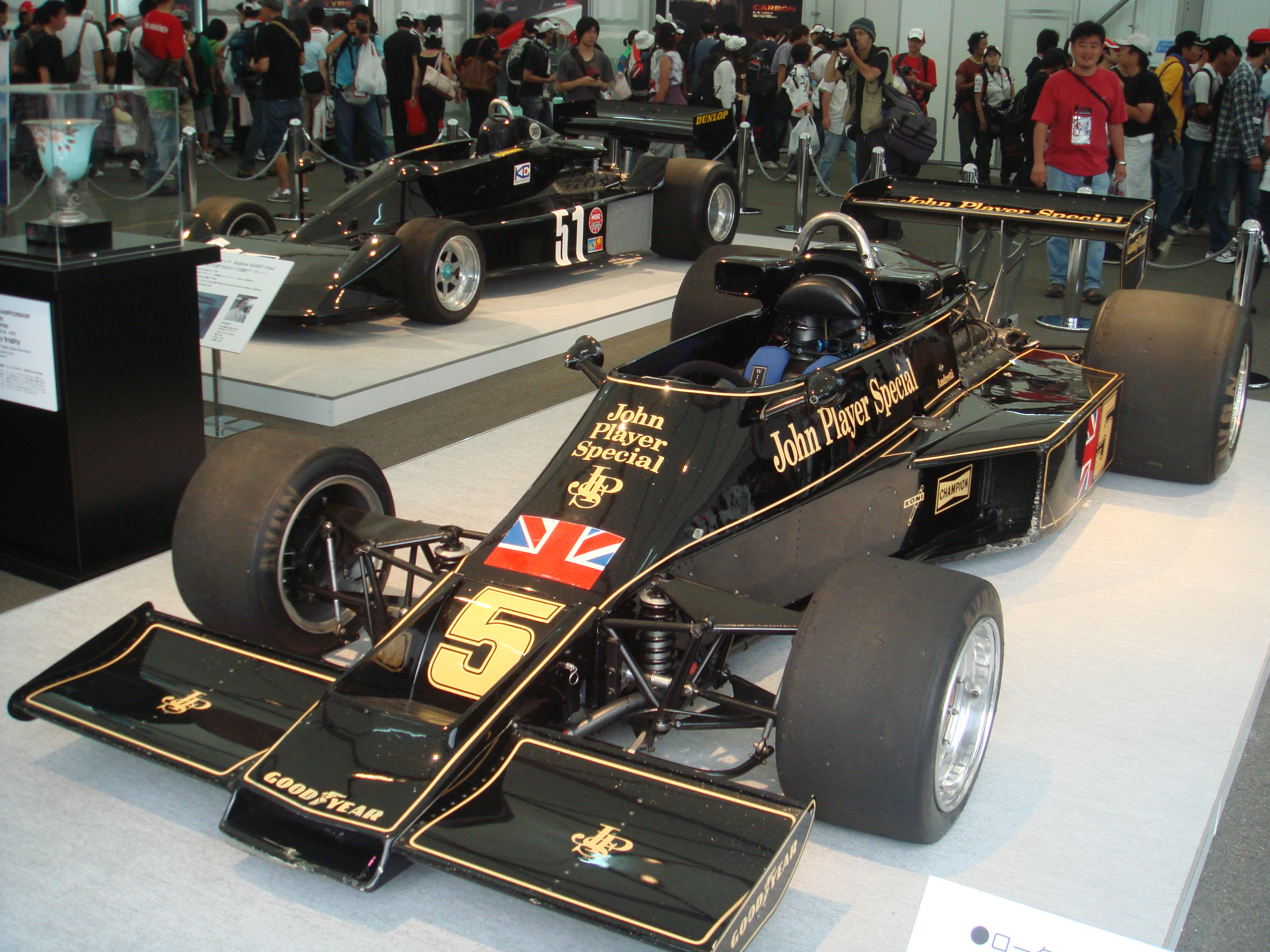
Lotus 77 in an exhibition

After a slow start to the season, the 77 proved to be best of the rest behind Ferrari, McLaren and Tyrrell. Andretti worked hard to develop the car, and from mid season onwards, the 77's performance picked up. It was however best suited to tracks with long corners such as Anderstorp, where Andretti led easily before engine failure put him out. At Zandvoort and Mosport Park tracks he finished on the podium.

Colin Chapman vetoed Andretti's request to race the Lotus 78 at Zandvoort, so Mario reluctantly raced the 77 until the end of the season. The final race was run in monsoon conditions at Fuji Speedway in Japan. Andretti's car was very well set-up for the track, with the car set to its narrowest width and with virtually flat rear wing; Andretti drove a clever tactical race to win by a lap from Patrick Depailler and new world champion James Hunt. Andretti was glad to put the 77 aside to concentrate on developing the 78 for the 1977 Formula One season.

== Complete Formula One World Championship results ==
(key) (Results in bold indicate pole position; results in italics indicate fastest lap.)

Year	Entrant	Engines	Drivers	1	2	3	4	5	6	7	8	9	10	11	12	13	14	15	16	Points	WCC
1976	John Player Team Lotus	Ford Cosworth DFV 3.0 V8		BRA	RSA	USW	ESP	BEL	MON	SWE	FRA	GBR	GER	AUT	NED	ITA	CAN	USA	JPN	**29**	**4th**
1976	John Player Team Lotus	Ford Cosworth DFV 3.0 V8	Ronnie Peterson	Ret																**29**	**4th**
1976	John Player Team Lotus	Ford Cosworth DFV 3.0 V8	Bob Evans		10	DNQ														**29**	**4th**
1976	John Player Team Lotus	Ford Cosworth DFV 3.0 V8	Mario Andretti	Ret			Ret	Ret		Ret	5	Ret	12	5	3	Ret	3	Ret	**1**	**29**	**4th**
1976	John Player Team Lotus	Ford Cosworth DFV 3.0 V8	Gunnar Nilsson		Ret	Ret	3	Ret	Ret	Ret	Ret	Ret	5	3	Ret	13	12	Ret	6	**29**	**4th**
