= J. Finzer and Brothers Company =

Tobacco business in Kentucky, USA

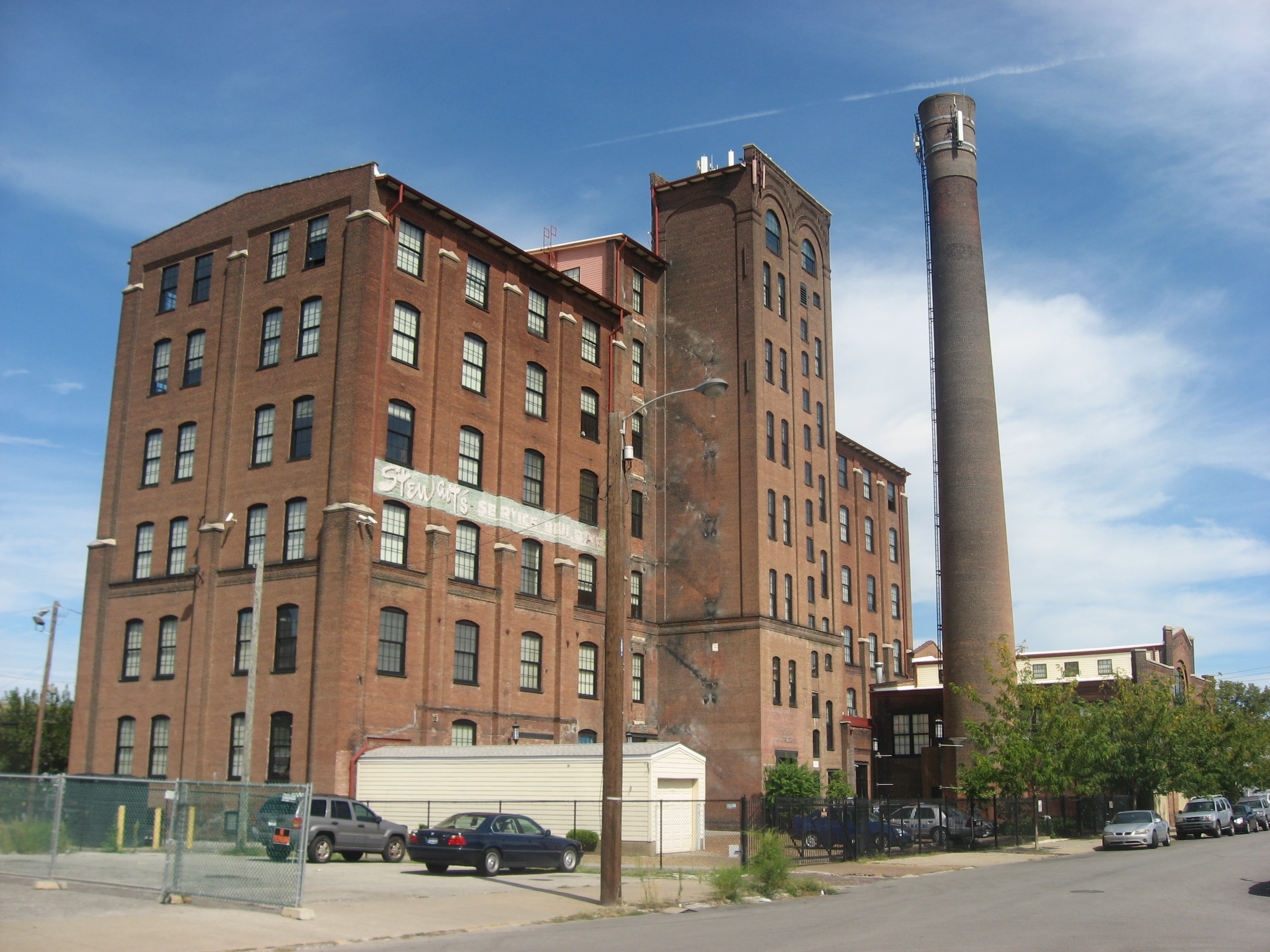
J. Finzer and Brothers Company warehouse building, front and western-side view

J. Finzer and Brothers Company, originally Five Brothers Tobacco Works, was a tobacco business in Louisville, Kentucky. The business was established in 1866 by the five Finzer brothers: John, Benjamin, Frederick, Rudolph, and Nicholas. The company's historic warehouse building was constructed in 1900 at 419 Finzer Street. The warehouse is listed on the National Register of Historic Places and was also used as Stewarts Dry Goods Warehouse and more recently was renovated to become the Lofts of Broadway.

== History ==
The brothers were born in the Canton Berne, Switzerland. They came to the U.S. and learned to make plug tobacco at Louisville's tobacco factories.

Benjamin died in 1875 and Frederick died in 1883. Rudolph Finzer withdrew from the firm in 1882, leaving John and Nicholas to run the company.

Known for quality products and with good relations to area businessmen, the brothers built up the business and incorporated in 1882. The capital stock of the company was $200,000 and it manufactured about 4,000,000 pounds of plug tobacco annually as well as 1,000,000 pounds of smoking tobacco.

A fire destroyed their factory in 1880, it was rebuilt in 1882, and the warehouse constructed later in 1900.

== Product line ==
The Finzers sold Burley leaf tobacco in sixteen-ounce plugs of navy tobacco. Their other brands included Jolly Tar, Five Brothers, and Pastime. The company published The Tobacconist, a trade paper. and used various promotions and advertising campaigns to market their wares. The business was acquired by American Tobacco Company shortly after the start of the 20th century.
