= Wills Navy Cut =

Indian cigarette brand

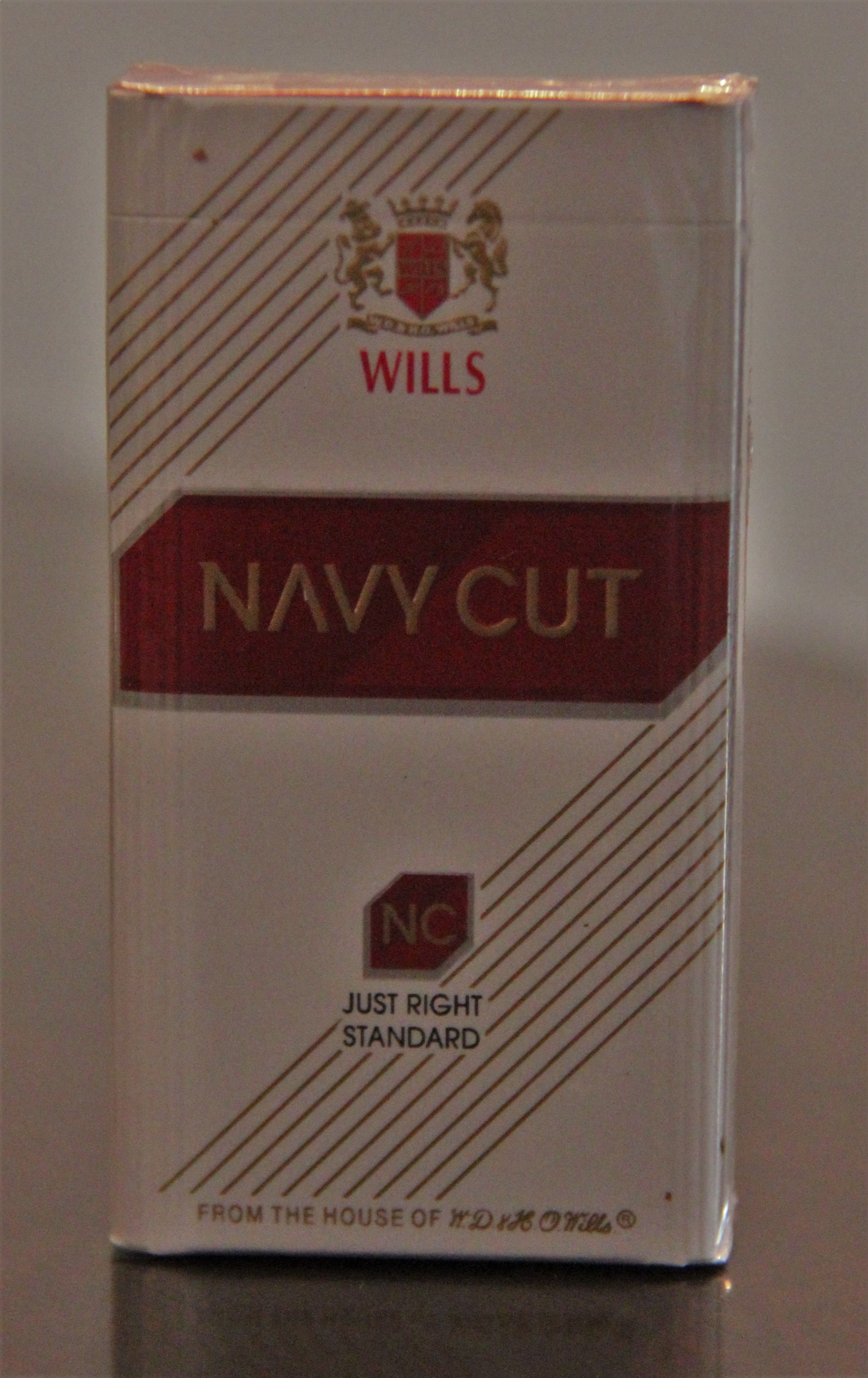
- A pack of Wills Navy Cut cigarettes
- Product type: Cigarette
- Produced by: ITC Limited in India, Imperial Tobacco outside of India
- Country: India
- Introduced: 1910; 116 years ago
- Markets: See Markets
- Previous owners: W.D. & H.O. Wills
- Registered as a trademark in: Yes
- Tagline: "Made for each other"

Wills Navy Cut is an Indian cigarette brand owned and produced by ITC Limited. Initially launched as Wills Filter, it was among the first Indian cigarettes to feature a filter. Over the years, the brand has undergone various changes in its marketing and packaging.

== History ==
Wills Navy Cut was originally manufactured by W.D. & H.O. Wills in the United Kingdom, being one of the most notable products of the company in Britain. In 1910, ITC Limited (then called "Imperial Tobacco Company of India Limited") commenced its operations in Kolkata. ITC started manufacturing cigarettes.

Wills Navy Cut Filter Tipped was launched in July 1963 in India at the price of 10 Indian Annas for a packet of 10 cigarettes. The company decided to market the filter as a product that enhanced the taste they were accustomed to, since many Indians at the time, were used to traditional unfiltered cigarettes.

In the years since, Wills Navy Cut was launched in a flat 10s pack with a red band. The W leaf was also a part of the pack. One of the most notable changes in the brand was to give Navy Cut its due prominence. Over time, the Wills Crest was replaced by the classic unicorns as well.

In 1988, W.D. & H.O. Wills ceased operations and production of Wills Navy Cut ended in the U.K. However, ITC, an independent company, continued to manufacture and market the cigarette in India. The phrase "From the House of W.D. & H.O. Wills" continues to be printed on the cigarettes and their packaging, despite them not being produced by W.D. & H.O. Wills.

== Marketing ==
From its inception, the marketing strategy for Navy Cut focused on the relationship between the cigarette's filter and tobacco, promoting the filter as an essential enhancement. This approach was notable for its inclusion of women, at a time in which cigarettes were marketed primarily towards men.

In 1965, ITC Limited initiated the "Made for Each Other" advertising campaign. This campaign featured a print advertisement with a married couple enjoying a Polish joke book, which then attempted to relate the relationship of a cigarette and a filter to a functioning marriage. This was intended to resonate with consumers on emotional and aspirational levels.

The campaign's impact was further solidified in 1969 with the introduction of the "Wills Made for Each Other" contest, which sought to identify couples who exemplified this ideal match. The campaign's visibility was maintained through posters displayed on prominent street corners across India until the early 1990s.

Navy Cut advertisements were phased out following the nationwide ban on tobacco advertising in 2004.

The "Made for each other" campaign went on to become one of the longest-running and most recognizable advertising campaigns in India.

The years 1968/69 saw considerable growth in competition from rival and lower-priced filter cigarettes. However, Navy Cut continued to retain its market share.

== Markets ==
Wills Navy Cut is mainly sold in India, but has also been sold in the United Kingdom, Kuwait, Saudi Arabia and Pakistan.

== See also ==
- Navy cut tobacco
- Player's Navy Cut
- List of cigarette brands
