= Lotus 72 =

Formula One racing car

Lotus 72 Lotus 72B Lotus 72C Lotus 72D Lotus 72E Lotus 72F
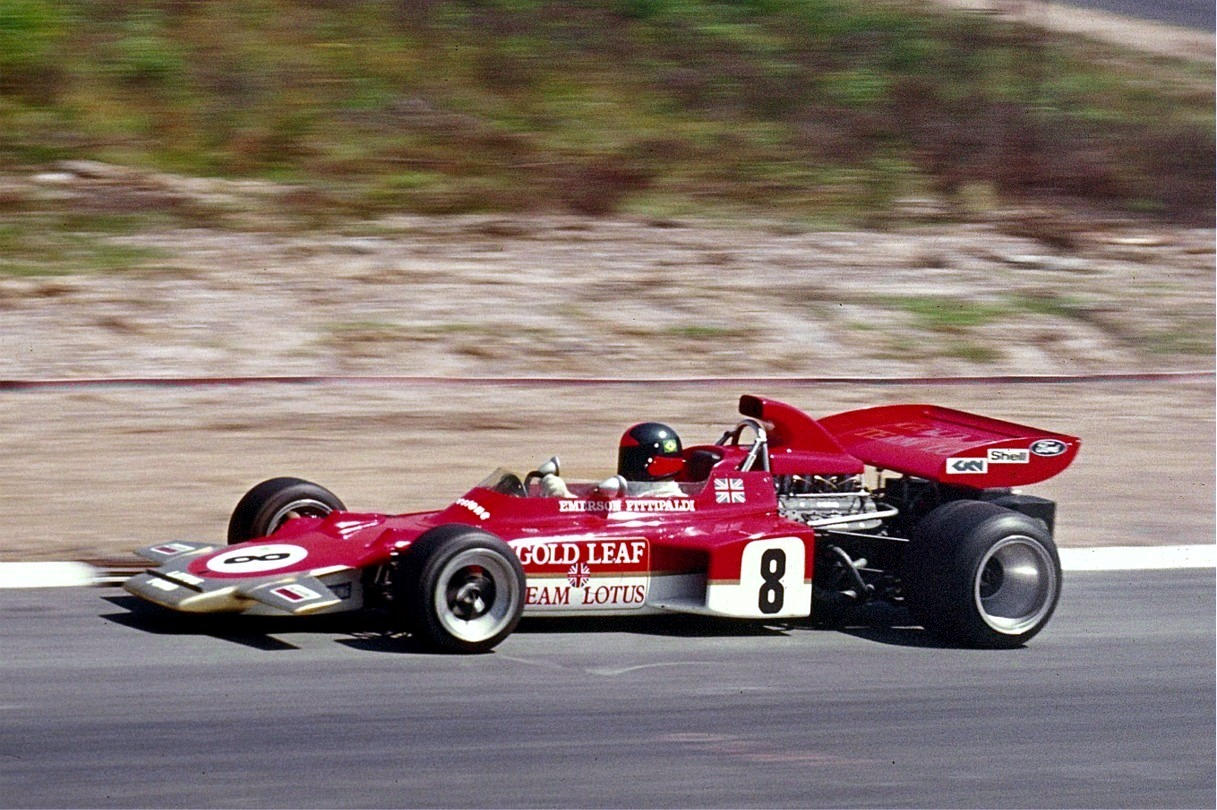
- Emerson Fittipaldi driving the 72D at the 1971 German Grand Prix
- Category: Formula One
- Constructor: Team Lotus
- Designers: Colin Chapman; Tony Rudd; Maurice Philippe
- Predecessor: 49 / 63
- Successor: 56B / 76 / 77

Technical specifications
- Chassis: Aluminium monocoque
- Suspension (front): Double wishbone, inboard spring/damper.
- Suspension (rear): Parallel top links, lower wishbones, twin radius arms, outboard spring/damper
- Engine: Ford Cosworth DFV, 2993cc V8, naturally aspirated, mid-engine, longitudinally-mounted
- Transmission: Hewland FG400, 5-speed manual
- Power: 440-465 hp @ 10,000-10,800 rpm
- Fuel: 1970–1971: Shell; 1972–1975: Texaco
- Tyres: 1970–1972, 1974: Firestone; 1974: Goodyear

Competition history
- Notable entrants: Gold Leaf Team Lotus (1970–1971); John Player Team Lotus (1972–1975)
- Notable drivers: (Austria) Jochen Rindt, (Brazil) Emerson Fittipaldi, (Sweden) Ronnie Peterson, (Belgium) Jacky Ickx
- Debut: 1970 Spanish Grand Prix
- First win: 1970 Dutch Grand Prix
- Last win: 1974 Italian Grand Prix
- Last event: 1975 United States Grand Prix
Races	Wins	Podiums	Poles	F/Laps
75	20	39	17	9
- Constructors' Championships: 3 (1970, 1972, 1973)
- Drivers' Championships: 2 (Rindt, 1970; Fittipaldi, 1972)
- Unless otherwise stated, all data refer to Formula One World Championship Grands Prix only.

The Lotus 72 is a Formula One car designed by Colin Chapman and Maurice Philippe of Lotus for the 1970 Formula One season. The 72 was a pioneering design featuring inboard brakes, side-mounted radiators in sidepods (as opposed to the nose-mounted radiators, which had been commonplace since before World War II), and aerodynamic wings producing down-force.

== Development ==
The overall shape of the 72 was innovative, resembling a wedge on wheels which was inspired by the earlier Lotus 56 gas turbine car. The shape made for better air penetration and higher speeds. In a back-to-back test with the Lotus 49, the 72 was 12 mph faster with the same Cosworth engine.

Chapman's and Phillippe's efforts produced one of the most remarkable and successful designs in F1 history. Taking the stressed engine layout technique from the Lotus 49 and adding advanced aerodynamics produced a car that was years ahead of its rivals. To begin with, however, problems with the handling of the car had to be overcome, due to a lack of 'feel' caused by the anti-dive suspension geometry – which was designed to prevent the nose of the car dipping significantly under braking – and the anti-squat set-up at the rear, which was supposed to stop the car 'squatting down' under acceleration. Once the suspension was modified, there were no further major problems aside from front inboard brake shafts failing. The car caused a sensation amongst the media and fans, with many people clamouring to see the remarkable car in action.

A total of nine chassis were built.

== Race history ==
=== 1970 ===
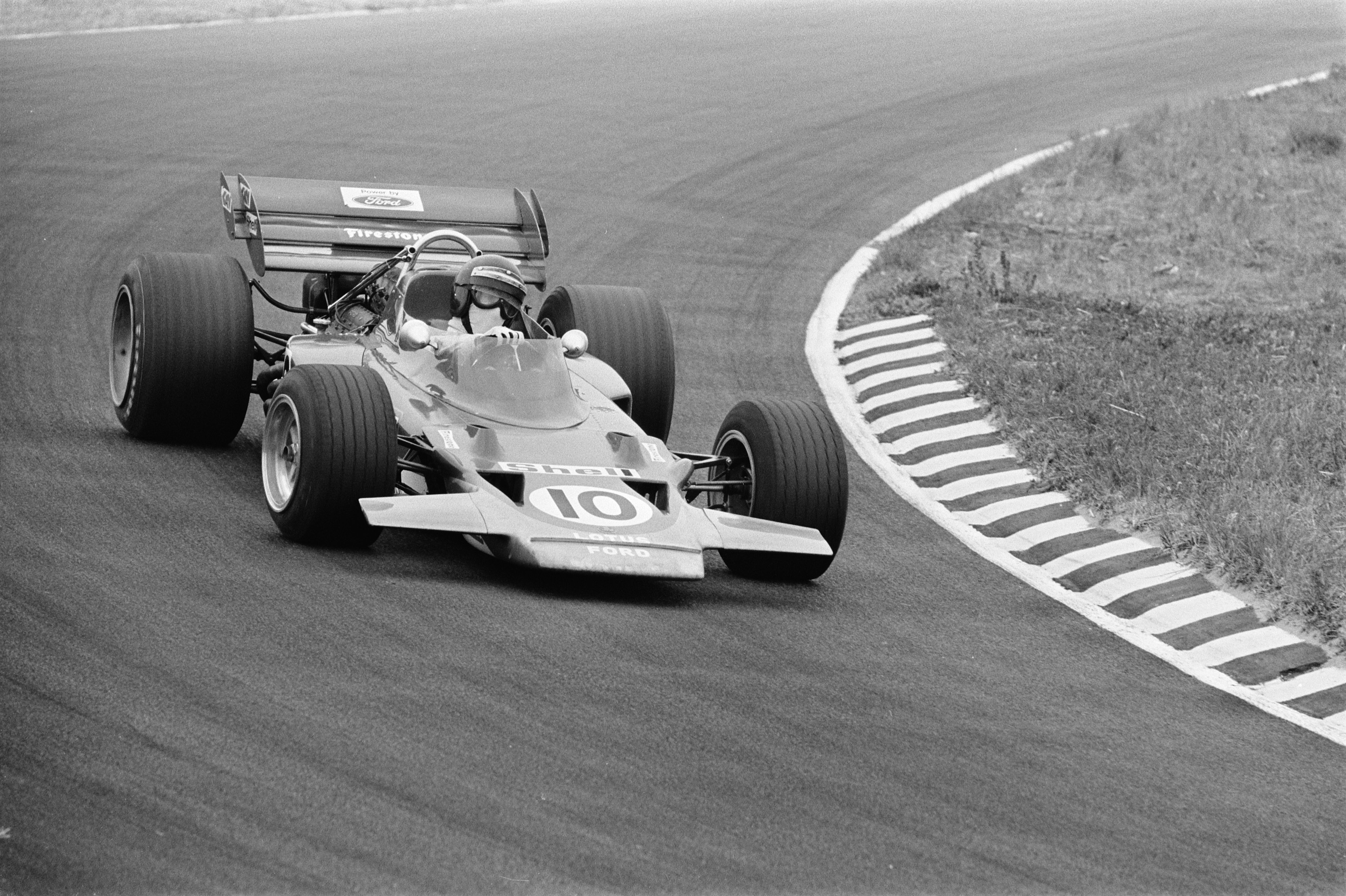
Jochen Rindt driving the 72 at the 1970 Dutch Grand Prix.

The car was introduced at the Spanish Grand Prix in April, the 2nd race of the 1970 season, and continued the red, cream and gold paint scheme of Gold Leaf cigarettes, first introduced with the Lotus 49. The cars were driven by Jochen Rindt and John Miles, but the 72 was withdrawn from competition after Spanish Grand Prix, due to poor performance, for suspension modification.

It was re-entered for the Dutch GP, and Rindt soon made the car successful, by winning the Dutch, French, British and German Grands Prix in quick succession. Rindt was almost certainly going to win the world championship but was killed in a qualifying crash at Monza, driving the 72 with its wings removed, when a front brake shaft failed sending the car at high speed into a poorly installed safety barrier. His replacement, Emerson Fittipaldi, won the United States race, helping Rindt become F1's only posthumous world champion. Rindt's and Fittipaldi's combined points for the season helped Lotus to its fourth constructors' championship.

=== 1971–1972 ===
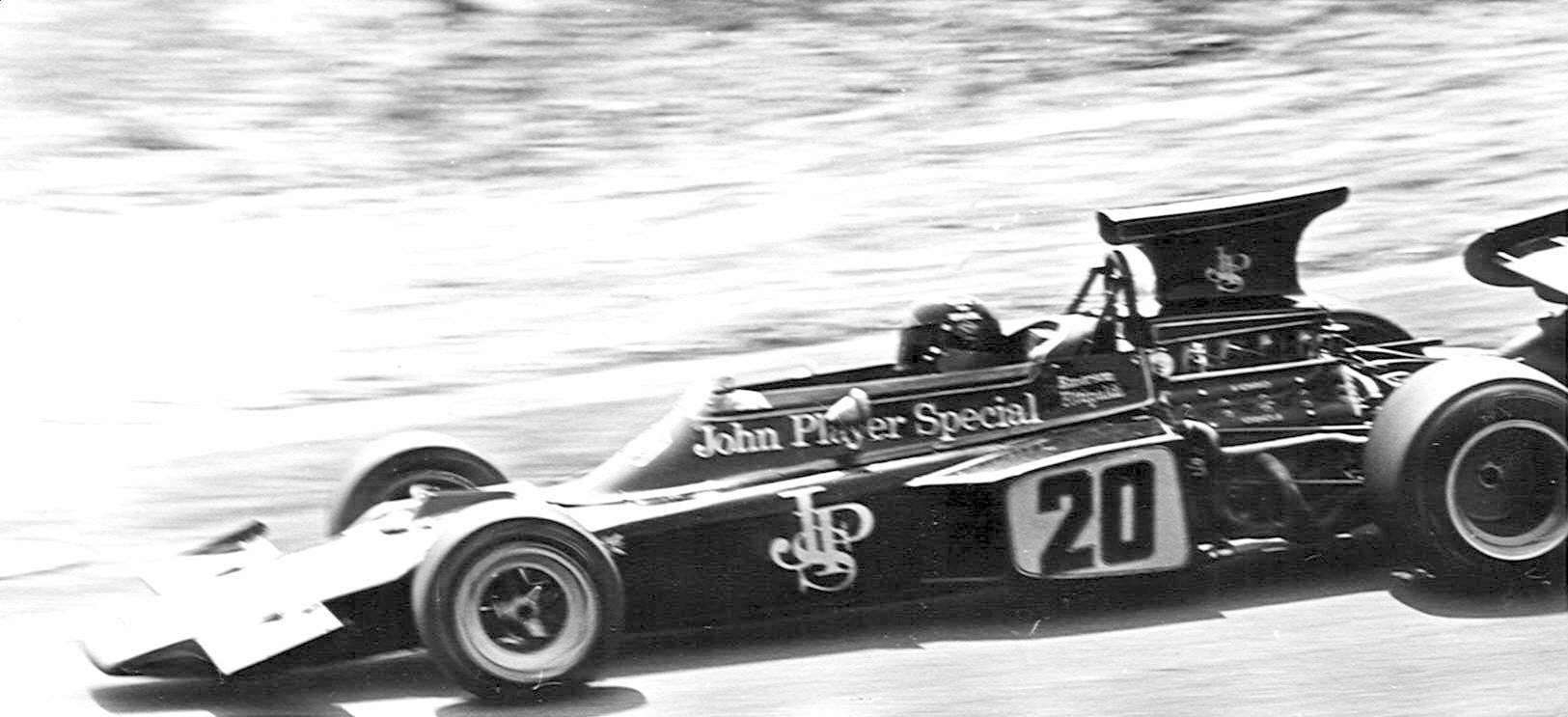
Fittipaldi at the wheel of the Lotus 72D at the 1972 Austrian Grand Prix.

The car was developed during 1971 by Tony Rudd who had formerly worked at BRM. He worked especially on redesigning the rear suspension and modified the rear wing to produce more downforce. Fittipaldi struggled during the season but scored good results and finished a respectable sixth, whilst the following season was much better. The development work done behind the scenes helped him become the youngest world champion in F1's history in 1972 winning five races in the 72, whilst Lotus again won the constructors' championship. The car now sported a striking paint scheme of black and gold; Imperial Tobacco had introduced a new brand, and decided to increase exposure and provide more funds to Lotus as part of the deal. Lotus was now sponsored by John Player Special cigarettes.

Lotus-Cosworth 72E

=== 1973 ===
The 1973 season saw new rules introduced to increase car safety. This included mandatory deformable structure to be built into the sides of the cars, causing the 72 to be further updated with integrated sidepods, larger bodywork and new wing mounts. Fittipaldi was joined for 1973 by Swede Ronnie Peterson. Peterson fell in love with the 72. In his first season with Lotus, Peterson won four races, while Fittipaldi won three, but a number of retirements helped Jackie Stewart snatch the drivers' championship, although the large points tally built up by their two drivers helped Lotus keep the constructors' championship. Fittipaldi left for McLaren in 1974, to drive a car closely based on the 72, the McLaren M23.

=== 1974 ===
This left Peterson as team leader, while Jacky Ickx joined the team to partner him. The 72 was meant to be replaced by the Lotus 76, intended to be a lighter and leaner version of the 72, but the car's technology proved to be too ambitious and the project flopped. Lotus turned to the venerable 72 for the 1974 season. A further update to the car, increasing the front and rear track kept the car competitive. Peterson won another three races and challenged for the championship in a very closely contested season, ably supported by Ickx who turned in solid performances and scored several podiums. The now aging 72 did remarkably well for a four-year-old design, finishing fourth in the constructors' championship.

=== 1975 ===
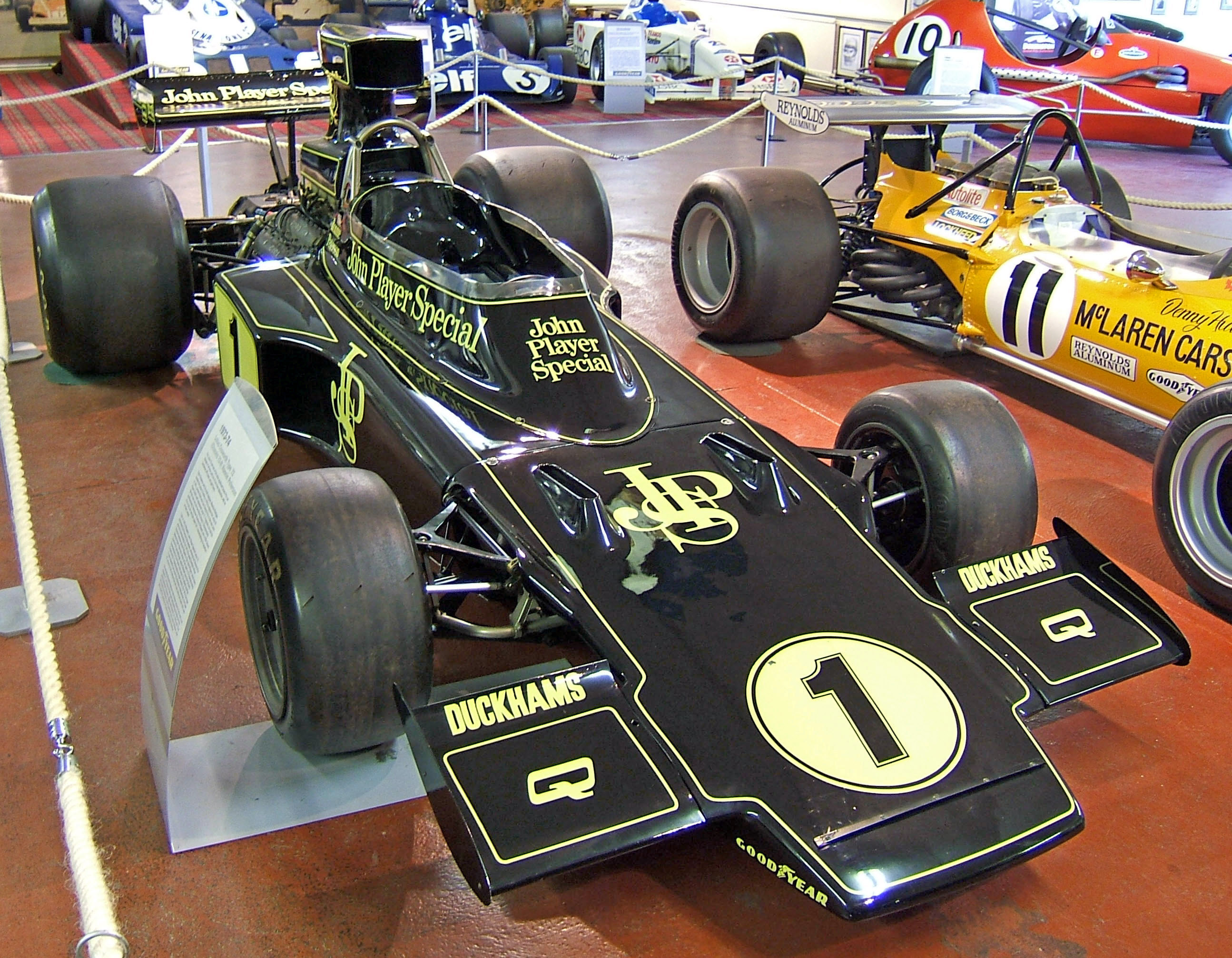
An ex-Ronnie Peterson Lotus 72E

For 1975, without a replacement chassis, the 72 was again pressed into service. By now it was obvious that the car, even with further modifications including a wider track and redesigned suspension, was no match for the new Ferrari 312T, which took the title, or even the latest Brabham BT44 and Lotus finished 6th in the constructors' championship.

After 20 wins, two drivers' and three constructors' championships, the 72 was retired for the 1976 season and replaced by the Lotus 77. Its longevity has placed it among the most successful Formula 1 cars.

=== Historic Formula One Championship ===
The car was later used to win the 1996 Historic Formula One Championship.

== Complete Formula One World Championship results ==
(key) (results in bold indicate pole position; results in italics indicate fastest lap)

Year	Chassis	Entrant	Engine	Tyres	Drivers	1	2	3	4	5	6	7	8	9	10	11	12	13	14	15	Points	WCC
1970	72; 72B; 72C	Gold Leaf Team Lotus	Ford Cosworth DFV	F		RSA	ESP	MON	BEL	NED	FRA	GBR	GER	AUT	ITA	CAN	USA	MEX			**59**^{1}	**1st**^{1}
1970	72; 72B; 72C	Gold Leaf Team Lotus	Ford Cosworth DFV	F	Jochen Rindt		Ret		PO	**1**	1	**1**	1	**Ret**	DNS						**59**^{1}	**1st**^{1}
1970	72; 72B; 72C	Gold Leaf Team Lotus	Ford Cosworth DFV	F	John Miles		DNQ		Ret	7	8	Ret	Ret	Ret	DNS						**59**^{1}	**1st**^{1}
1970	72; 72B; 72C	Gold Leaf Team Lotus	Ford Cosworth DFV	F	Emerson Fittipaldi										DNS		1	Ret			**59**^{1}	**1st**^{1}
1970	72; 72B; 72C	Gold Leaf Team Lotus	Ford Cosworth DFV	F	Reine Wisell												3	NC			**59**^{1}	**1st**^{1}
1970	72; 72B; 72C	Brooke Bond Oxo Racing	Ford Cosworth DFV	F	Graham Hill									DNA	DNS	NC	Ret	Ret			**59**^{1}	**1st**^{1}
1970	72; 72B; 72C	World Wide Racing	Ford Cosworth DFV	F	Alex Soler-Roig				DNQ												**59**^{1}	**1st**^{1}
1971	72C; 72D	Gold Leaf Team Lotus	Ford Cosworth DFV	F		RSA	ESP	MON	NED	FRA	GBR	GER	AUT	ITA	CAN	USA					21	5th
1971	72C; 72D	Gold Leaf Team Lotus	Ford Cosworth DFV	F	Emerson Fittipaldi	Ret	Ret	5		3	3	Ret	2		7	NC					21	5th
1971	72C; 72D	Gold Leaf Team Lotus	Ford Cosworth DFV	F	Reine Wisell	4	NC	Ret	DSQ	6		8	4		5	Ret					21	5th
1971	72C; 72D	Gold Leaf Team Lotus	Ford Cosworth DFV	F	Dave Charlton				DNS		Ret										21	5th
1971	72C; 72D	Villiger Cigar Team	Ford Cosworth DFV	F	Herbert Müller									DNA							21	5th
1972	72D	John Player Team Lotus	Ford Cosworth DFV	F		ARG	RSA	ESP	MON	BEL	FRA	GBR	GER	AUT	ITA	CAN	USA				**61**	**1st**
1972	72D	John Player Team Lotus	Ford Cosworth DFV	F	Emerson Fittipaldi	Ret	2	1	**3**	**1**	2	1	Ret	**1**	1	11	Ret				**61**	**1st**
1972	72D	John Player Team Lotus	Ford Cosworth DFV	F	David Walker	DSQ	10	9	14	14	18	Ret	Ret	Ret			Ret				**61**	**1st**
1972	72D	John Player Team Lotus	Ford Cosworth DFV	F	Tony Trimmer							DNA									**61**	**1st**
1972	72D	John Player Team Lotus	Ford Cosworth DFV	F	Reine Wisell											Ret	10				**61**	**1st**
1972	72D	Scribante Lucky Strike Racing	Ford Cosworth DFV	F	Dave Charlton		Ret				DNQ	Ret	Ret								**61**	**1st**
1973	72D; 72E	John Player Team Lotus	Ford Cosworth DFV	G		ARG	BRA	RSA	ESP	BEL	MON	SWE	FRA	GBR	NED	GER	AUT	ITA	CAN	USA	**92 (96)**	**1st**
1973	72D; 72E	John Player Team Lotus	Ford Cosworth DFV	G	Emerson Fittipaldi	1	1	3	1	3	2	12	Ret	Ret	Ret	6	**Ret**	2	2	6	**92 (96)**	**1st**
1973	72D; 72E	John Player Team Lotus	Ford Cosworth DFV	G	Ronnie Peterson	Ret	**Ret**	11	**Ret**	**Ret**	3	**2**	1	**2**	**11**	Ret	1	**1**	**Ret**	**1**	**92 (96)**	**1st**
1973	72D; 72E	Scribante Lucky Strike Racing	Ford Cosworth DFV	G	Dave Charlton			Ret													**92 (96)**	**1st**
1974	72E	John Player Team Lotus	Ford Cosworth DFV	G		ARG	BRA	RSA	ESP	BEL	MON	SWE	NED	FRA	GBR	GER	AUT	ITA	CAN	USA	42^{2}	4th^{2}
1974	72E	John Player Team Lotus	Ford Cosworth DFV	G	Ronnie Peterson	**13**	6				1	Ret	8	1	10		Ret	1	3	Ret	42^{2}	4th^{2}
1974	72E	John Player Team Lotus	Ford Cosworth DFV	G	Jacky Ickx	Ret	3				Ret	Ret	11	5	3	5			13	Ret	42^{2}	4th^{2}
1974	72E	Team Gunston	Ford Cosworth DFV	F	Paddy Driver			Ret													42^{2}	4th^{2}
1974	72E	Team Gunston	Ford Cosworth DFV	F	Ian Scheckter			13													42^{2}	4th^{2}
1974	72E	Scribante Lucky Strike Racing	Ford Cosworth DFV	G	John McNicol			DNA													42^{2}	4th^{2}
1975	72E; 72F	John Player Team Lotus	Ford Cosworth DFV	G		ARG	BRA	RSA	ESP	MON	BEL	SWE	NED	FRA	GBR	GER	AUT	ITA	USA		9	7th
1975	72E; 72F	John Player Team Lotus	Ford Cosworth DFV	G	Ronnie Peterson	Ret	15	10	Ret	4	Ret	9	15	10	Ret	Ret	5	Ret	5		9	7th
1975	72E; 72F	John Player Team Lotus	Ford Cosworth DFV	G	Jacky Ickx	8	9	12	2	8	Ret	15	Ret	Ret							9	7th
1975	72E; 72F	John Player Team Lotus	Ford Cosworth DFV	G	Jim Crawford										Ret			13			9	7th
1975	72E; 72F	John Player Team Lotus	Ford Cosworth DFV	G	Brian Henton										16		DNS		NC		9	7th
1975	72E; 72F	John Player Team Lotus	Ford Cosworth DFV	G	John Watson											Ret					9	7th
1975	72E; 72F	Team Gunston	Ford Cosworth DFV	G	Guy Tunmer			11													9	7th
1975	72E; 72F	Team Gunston	Ford Cosworth DFV	G	Eddie Keizan			13													9	7th

^1 Includes 14 points scored using the Lotus 49.
^2 Includes 3 points scored using the Lotus 76.

=== Non-championship Formula One results ===
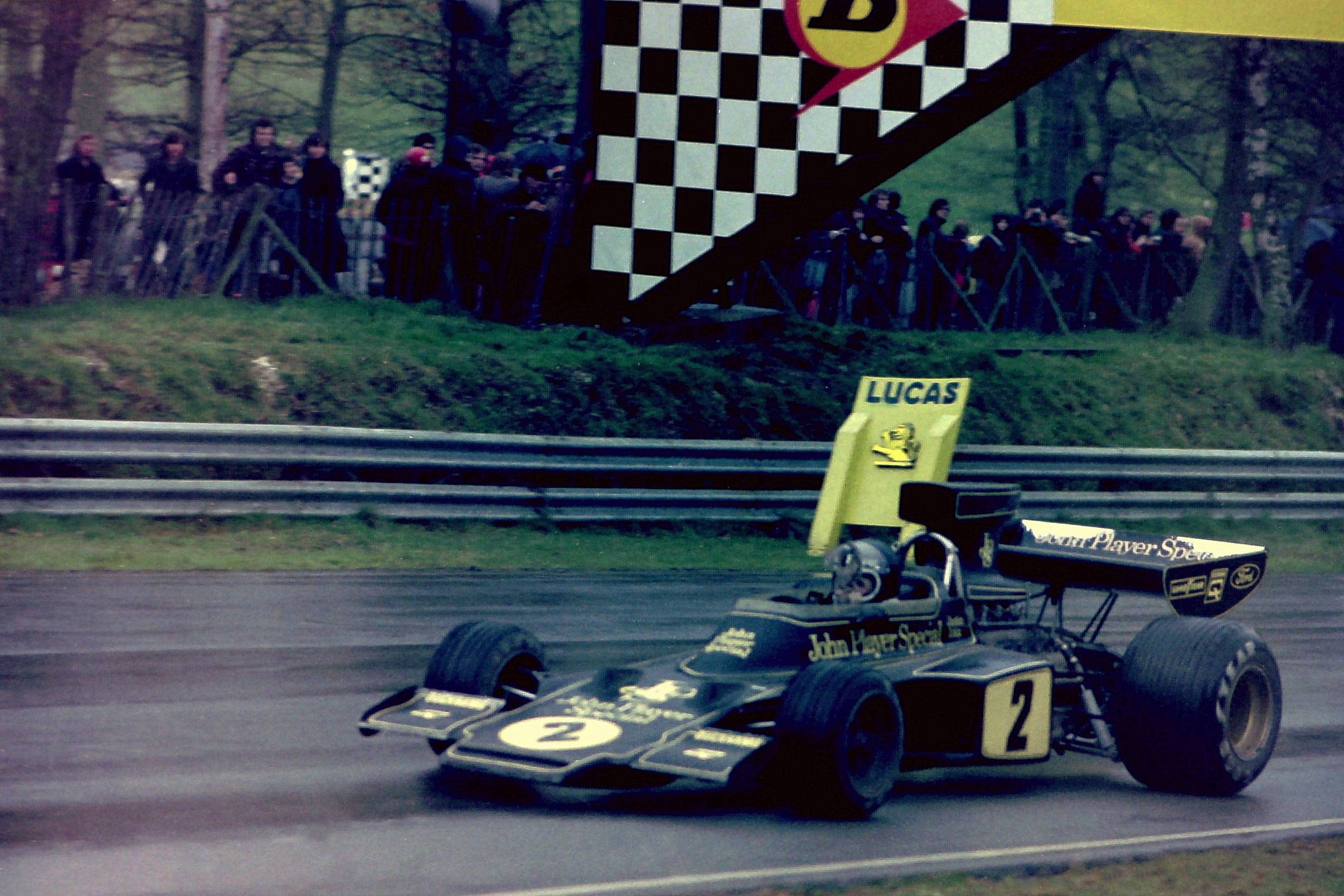
Jacky Ickx in a 72E, after taking victory at the 1974 Race of Champions

(key)

Year	Entrant	Engine	Tyres	Drivers	1	2	3	4	5	6	7	8
1970	Gold Leaf Team Lotus	Ford Cosworth DFV	F		ROC	INT	OUL					
1970	Gold Leaf Team Lotus	Ford Cosworth DFV	F	John Miles		17						
1970	Gold Leaf Team Lotus	Ford Cosworth DFV	F	Jochen Rindt			2					
1970	R.R.C. Walker Racing	Ford Cosworth DFV	F	Graham Hill			Ret					
1971	Gold Leaf Team Lotus	Ford Cosworth DFV	F		ARG	ROC	QUE	SPR	INT	RIN	OUL	VIC
1971	Gold Leaf Team Lotus	Ford Cosworth DFV	F	Reine Wisell	Ret	Ret	Ret		13	10		
1971	Gold Leaf Team Lotus	Ford Cosworth DFV	F	Emerson Fittipaldi	Ret		Ret	7				2
1971	Gold Leaf Team Lotus	Ford Cosworth DFV	F	Tony Trimmer		Ret				DNS		
1971	Gold Leaf Team Lotus	Ford Cosworth DFV	F	David Walker						9		
1972	John Player Team Lotus	Ford Cosworth DFV	F		ROC	BRA	INT	OUL	REP	VIC		
1972	John Player Team Lotus	Ford Cosworth DFV	F	Emerson Fittipaldi	1	Ret	1	2	1	Ret		
1972	John Player Team Lotus	Ford Cosworth DFV	F	David Walker	9	5	DNS	Ret				
1973	John Player Team Lotus	Ford Cosworth DFV	G		ROC	INT						
1973	John Player Team Lotus	Ford Cosworth DFV	G	Emerson Fittipaldi	Ret	Ret						
1973	John Player Team Lotus	Ford Cosworth DFV	G	Ronnie Peterson	Ret	2						
1974	John Player Team Lotus	Ford Cosworth DFV	G		PRE	ROC	INT					
1974	John Player Team Lotus	Ford Cosworth DFV	G	Jacky Ickx		1						
1975	John Player Team Lotus	Ford Cosworth DFV	G		ROC	INT	SUI					
1975	John Player Team Lotus	Ford Cosworth DFV	G	Ronnie Peterson	3	DNS	4					
1975	John Player Team Lotus	Ford Cosworth DFV	G	Jacky Ickx	4							
1975	John Player Team Lotus	Ford Cosworth DFV	G	Jim Crawford		DNS						

== Legacy ==
In 1973, Brazilian singer-songwriter Zé Roberto released a single titled "Lotus 72D", inspired by Emerson Fittipaldi's victory at the 1973 Brazilian Grand Prix.

The special edition of the second generation Lotus Elise commemorates the car with two versions, the Type 72 edition and the 72D edition.

The Lotus 72 appears as a playable vehicle in multitude video games including Lotus Challenge and F1 2019.

== Bibliography ==
- Lyons, Pete (2019). Lotus 72: An Autobiography of Formula One's Greatest Racing Car. Evro Publishing. p. 304. ISBN 978-1-910505-33-5.
