= Player's Navy Cut =

Cigarette brand

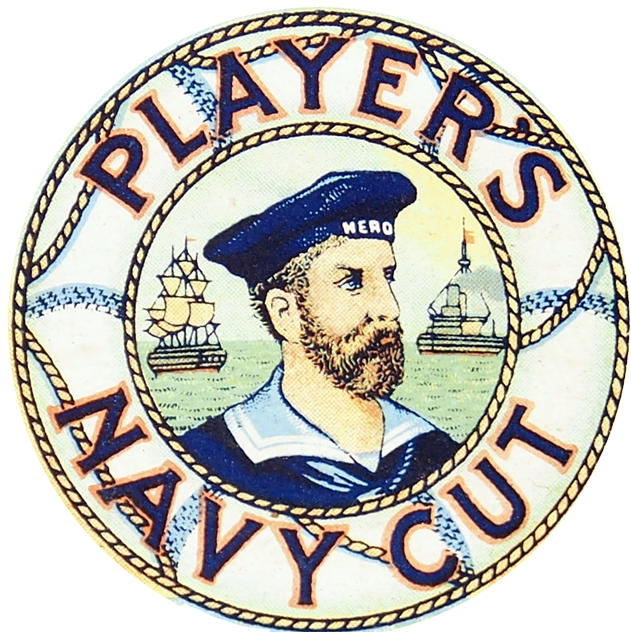
- Product type: Cigarette
- Produced by: Imperial Brands
- Introduced: 1883
- Discontinued: 2015 (UK)

Navy Cut Tobacco was a brand of tobacco products, pipe and cigarette, originally manufactured by John Player & Sons in Nottingham, England where it continued to be produced after Player's became a branch of the Imperial Tobacco Company of Great Britain and Ireland in 1901. Named "Player's Navy Cut," the brand gained popularity in Britain, Germany, and British Ceylon (present-day Sri Lanka) during the late 19th and early 20th centuries, later expanding to the United States. The brand's packaging featured a distinctive logo of a sailor in a 'Navy Cut' cap.

The term "Navy Cut" reportedly originated from sailors' practice of binding tobacco leaves with string or twine, allowing the tobacco to mature under pressure, and then slicing off a "cut" for use. The product was also available in pipe tobacco form.

== Packaging ==
The cigarettes were initially available in tins, later transitioning to cardboard containers resembling classic matchboxes and eventually adopting the flip-top design common among cigarette brands in the 1950s.

== Marketing ==
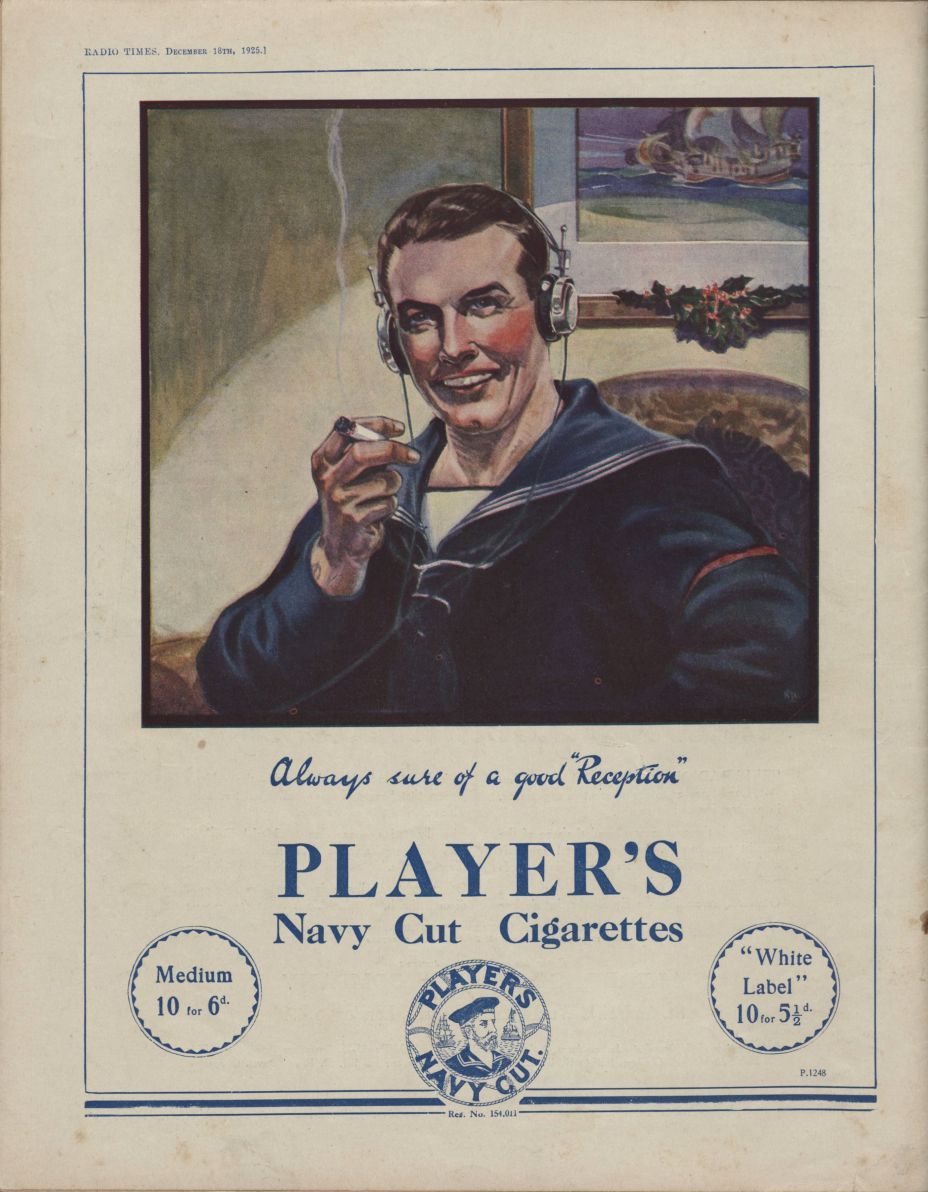
Advert from the Christmas edition of the Radio Times magazine, 1925

The brand's imagery, featuring a sailor known as "Hero," evolved over time but retained its appeal to consumers. Advertising campaigns emphasised the product's quality and universal appeal. Player's Medium Navy Cut became the most popular variant, especially in the South of England and among the middle class. Despite its popularity, the brand was discontinued in the UK by the end of 2015.

== See also ==
- Navy cut tobacco
- Wills Navy Cut
- List of cigarette brands
