= Navy cut tobacco =

Method of storing tobacco

Navy Flake, Navy cut, Navy tobacco is a Virginia tobacco. In colonial times sailors twisted tobacco into a roll and "tied it tightly, often moistening the leaves with rum, molasses, or spice solutions." Stored in this way the flavors melded. To smoke it a slice was cut, known as a "twist" or "curly". Eventually all twisted tobacco, and then pressed tobacco, became known as "Navy" "because of the convenience for sailors and outdoorsmen who favored its compact size "and long-lasting, slow-burning qualities." Navy Flake tobacco is pressed into bricks and sliced into broad flakes.

== See also ==
- Player's Navy Cut
- Wills Navy Cut
