= John Player & Sons =

English manufacturer of tobacco products

John Player & Sons Ltd.
- Current logo of the "John Player Special" brand

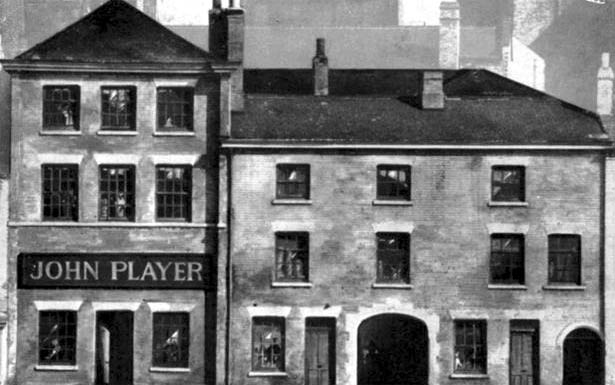
- The original John Player factory in Broadmarsh, Nottingham, England
- Type: Private
- Industry: Tobacco
- Predecessor: John Player & Sons.
- Founded: 1877
- Founder: John Player
- Defunct: 1901; 125 years ago
- Fate: Merged with twelve other companies and became a branch of the Imperial Tobacco Company (of Great Britain & Ireland) in 1901; some of its iconic brands remain in production.
- Successor: Imperial Tobacco (1901–1986)
- Headquarters: Lenton, Nottingham, England
- Area served: Worldwide
- Products: Cigarettes
- Brands: Player's; John Player Special; Navy Cut

John Player & Sons, most often known simply as Player's, was a tobacco and cigarette manufacturer based in Nottingham, England. In 1901 the company merged with twelve other companies to become a branch of the Imperial Tobacco Company of Great Britain and Ireland. The company pioneered the advertising with trading (cigarette) cards. As a branch, Player's continued this practice (see below), most notably with a series devoted to the association football in the 1930s.

The brands currently sold, "Players" and "John Player Special" are owned and marketed by Imperial Brands and, especially in markets external to the UK, by British American Tobacco. In the UK, the JPS Players brand is the third-most popular cigarette brand (As of November 2025). Its Gold Leaf rolling tobacco is the fourth most-popular in the UK.

== History ==
In March 1820, William Wright set up a small tobacco factory in Craigshill, Livingston, West Lothian. This business expanded and earned Wright a comfortable fortune. John Player bought the business in 1877. He had the Castle Tobacco Factories built in Radford, Nottingham, just west of the city centre. He had three factories built, but initially only one was used to process and pack tobacco. The other two blocks were rented out to lace manufacturers until the business had expanded enough to use the additional space.

John Player died in December 1884 and for the next nine years the business was run by a small group of family friends until his sons, William Goodacre Player and John Dane Player, took over management of the firm in 1893. The business became a private limited company in 1895, with an issued share capital of £200,000.

In 1901, in response to a serious competitive challenge from "Buck" Duke's American Tobacco Company, a defensive merger of thirteen British tobacco manufacturers saw Player's merged into the newly created Imperial Tobacco Company of Great Britain & Ireland, with William and John Player as board directors.

The largest constituent of Imperial Tobacco, and major driver of the amalgamation, was W. D. & H. O. Wills and the new company was run for eight years from a suite of offices located in the Wills' branch premises until a new Imperial Tobacco head office was built in Bedminster, Bristol. As a constituent part of Imperial Tobacco, Player's was tightly controlled from Bedminster but as a manufacturer the branch retained its own identity, producing distinctive cigarette brands such as Navy Cut, No. 9, John Player Special, and Gold Leaf; loose tobacco brands such as No Name; and its distinctive logo of a smoking sailor in a navy-cut cap.

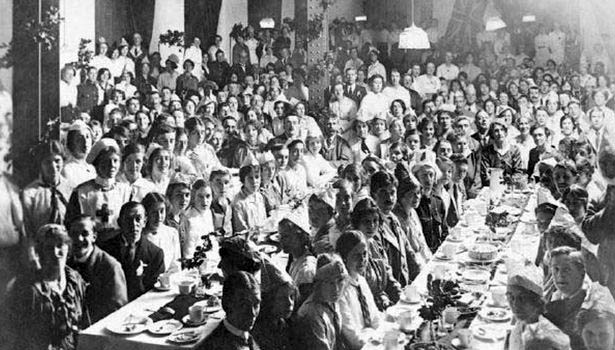
Workers and staff of John Player at a Christmas party in the 1920s

Player's Medium Navy Cut was the most popular by far of the three Navy Cut brands (there was also Mild and Gold Leaf, mild being today's rich flavour). In January 1937, Player's sold nearly 3.5 million cigarettes (which included 1.34 million in London). The popularity of the brand was mostly amongst the middle class and in the South of England. It was smoked in the north but other brands were locally more popular.

Production continued to grow until at its peak in the late 1950s, Player's was employing 11,000 workers (compared to 5,000 in 1926) and producing 15 brands of pipe tobacco and 11 brands of cigarettes.

In the UK in 1968, in response to an increase in tobacco duty in the budget, Player's launched a new, cheaper brand, "Player's No.10". Priced at 3 s 2 d (16 p) for 20, it was the cheapest cigarette on the British market.

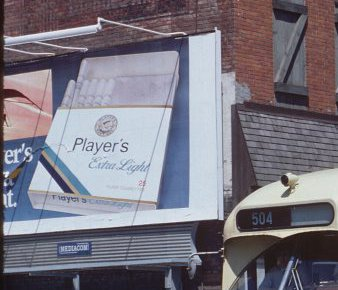
Pack of Player's Extra Lights shown on a billboard in Toronto, Canada, c. 1980

A new factory (the 'Horizon' factory) was opened in the early 1970s on Nottingham's industrial outskirts, with better road access and more effective floor space, next to the headquarters of Boots the Chemists. On 15 April 2014, Imperial Tobacco announced that the Horizon factory would close in early 2016, bringing an end to cigarette and tobacco manufacture in Nottingham after over 130 years.

The old factories in Radford, especially the cavernous No. 1 Factory which occupied the whole area between Radford Boulevard and Alfreton Road, bordered by Player Street and Beckenham Road, were gradually run down. The No. 2 Factory, facing onto Radford Boulevard with its distinctive clock (now plinthed in the retail park on the site) and the No. 3 factory (which faced onto Churchfield lane) with its rooftop 'John Player & Sons' sign, were demolished in the late 1980s. The iron railings and gates onto Radford Boulevard from the present retail park are the ones that surrounded No. 2 Factory – the large gates (present vehicle access) were the entrance to the factory yard between No. 2 and No. 3 factories and the smaller gates were the pedestrian entrances to No. 2 factory itself.

== Manufacture ==
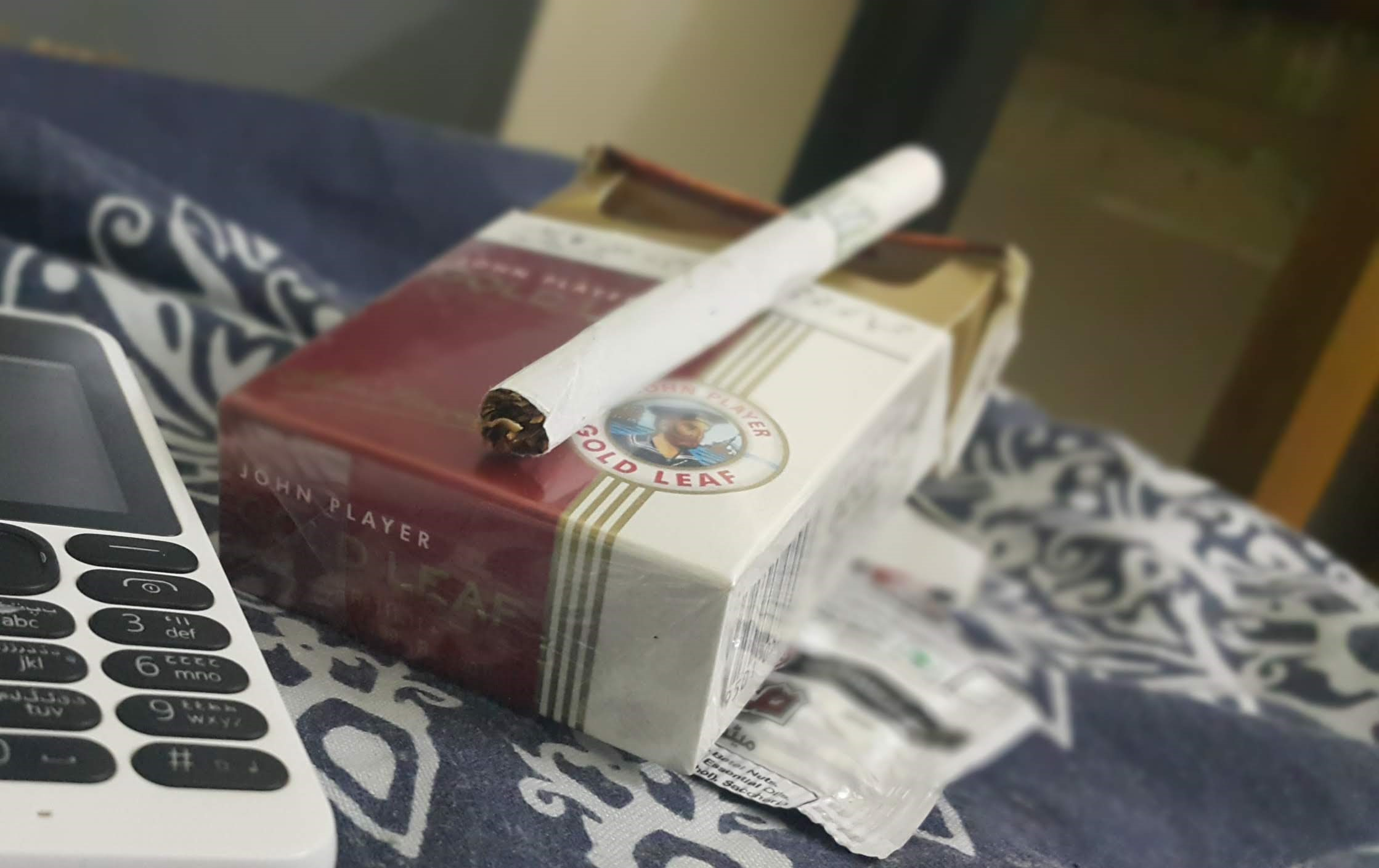
Gold Leaf is the widely used cigarette brand in Pakistan

Player's still trades, but with a much-reduced workforce (down to about 700 employees due to increased efficiency) compared to the 20th century, when it was one of the Big Three employers associated with Nottingham, along with Boots the Chemists and the Raleigh Bicycle Company. Player's workforce peaked in the 1960s: subsequently the company's fortunes declined as awareness of the health effects of tobacco increased, and during the 1980s five of the firm's Nottingham factories closed with the loss of 3,000 jobs. Its current workforce is eclipsed by larger service sector employers in the city, such as Experian and Queen's Medical Centre and the University of Nottingham.

As of 2020, the Player's Navy Cut, Players and John Player Special (JPS) brands are manufactured by Imperial Brands in the UK, whereas John Player Gold Leaf is manufactured by British American Tobacco for sale in markets external to the UK, and ranks as one of the best selling and most popular tobacco products in Pakistan. It is also marketed in Bangladesh, Sri Lanka, Malaysia, and Arab States of the Persian Gulf. In South Asia, it is one of the biggest brands in the High category brand list.

The JPS brand has also been re-positioned in the last several years and is now a UK mid-price cigarette brand.

=== United Kingdom ===
As of 2020, John Player Special (JPS) sell the following cigarettes in the UK:

- JPS Black King Size
- JPS Real Blue King Size and Superkings
- JPS Silver Stream King Size and Superkings
- JPS Crushball King Size (discontinued as of 20 May 2020)
- JPS Green Edge King Size and Superkings (discontinued as of 20 May 2020)
- JPS Triple Flow King Size

They also sell a lower-cost product marketed under the JPS Players Brand:

- JPS Players Real Red King Size and Superkings
- JPS Players Bright Blue King Size and Superkings
- JPS Players Crushball King Size and Superkings (discontinued as of 20 May 2020)
- JPS Players Green Superkings (discontinued as of 20 May 2020)

As of November 2025, the Players cigarette brand holds 9.9% of the UK market and is the third-most popular cigarette brand in the country.

Also the following rolling tobacco in 30g and 50g pouches:

- JPS Hand Rolling Tobacco
- JPS Players Tobacco
- Gold Leaf JPS Quality Blend Tobacco

=== Canada ===
In Canada, Player's is manufactured by Imperial Tobacco Canada and is available in the following varieties, in both regular and king size:

- Player's Original Flavour
- Player's Rich Flavour
- Player's Smooth Flavour
- Player's Plain
- Player's Black & Red
- Player's Black & Gold
- Player's Black & Silver
- John Player Smooth
- John Player Special
- John Player Standard Blue
- John Player Standard Silver
- John Player Choice (discontinued)
- Player's Special Blend

Besides cigarettes, John Player & Sons also markets a line of rolling tobacco in Canada, the UK, and several European countries. The rolling tobacco is typically portioned into 12.5, 25, and 50-gram bags.

Rolling tobacco is available in the following varieties:

- John Player Special Red
- John Player Special Blue
- John Player Special Silver
- John Player Halfzware Shag
- Player's Gold Leaf

=== Ireland ===
In Ireland, Imperial Brands trade as John Player. The following John Player products are on the market in Ireland.

- John Player Blue King Size
- John Player Blue King Size 24s
- John Player Blue King Size 27s
- John Player Blue 100s
- John Player Blue Compact
- JPS Blue King Size
- JPS Blue King Size 23s
- JPS Blue King Size 28s
- JPS Blue King Size 34s
- JPS Blue 100s
- JPS Red King Size
- JPS Red King Size 23s
- JPS Red 100s
- JPS Silver Stream King Size
- JPS Silvet Stream 100s
- JPS Bright King Size
- JPS Cool Green King Size (replaced JPS Crush Ball)
- JPS Cool Green 100s (replaced JPS Green 100s)
- Superkings Black
- Superkings Bright (previously Blue)
- Lambert & Butler Silver King Size
- Regal King Size
- Players Navy Cut
- Drum The Original Tobacco
- Drum Bright Blue
- Golden Virginia Original
- Golden Virginia Yellow
- Riverstone Rolling Tobacco
- John Player Blue Volume Tobacco
- JPS Blue Volume Tobacco
- JPS Silver Volume Tobacco

=== Sri Lanka ===
In Sri Lanka, Player's is manufactured by Ceylon Tobacco Company and is available in the following varieties.

- John Player Gold Leaf
- John Player Gold
- John Player Navy Cut

== Sponsorship and marketing ==
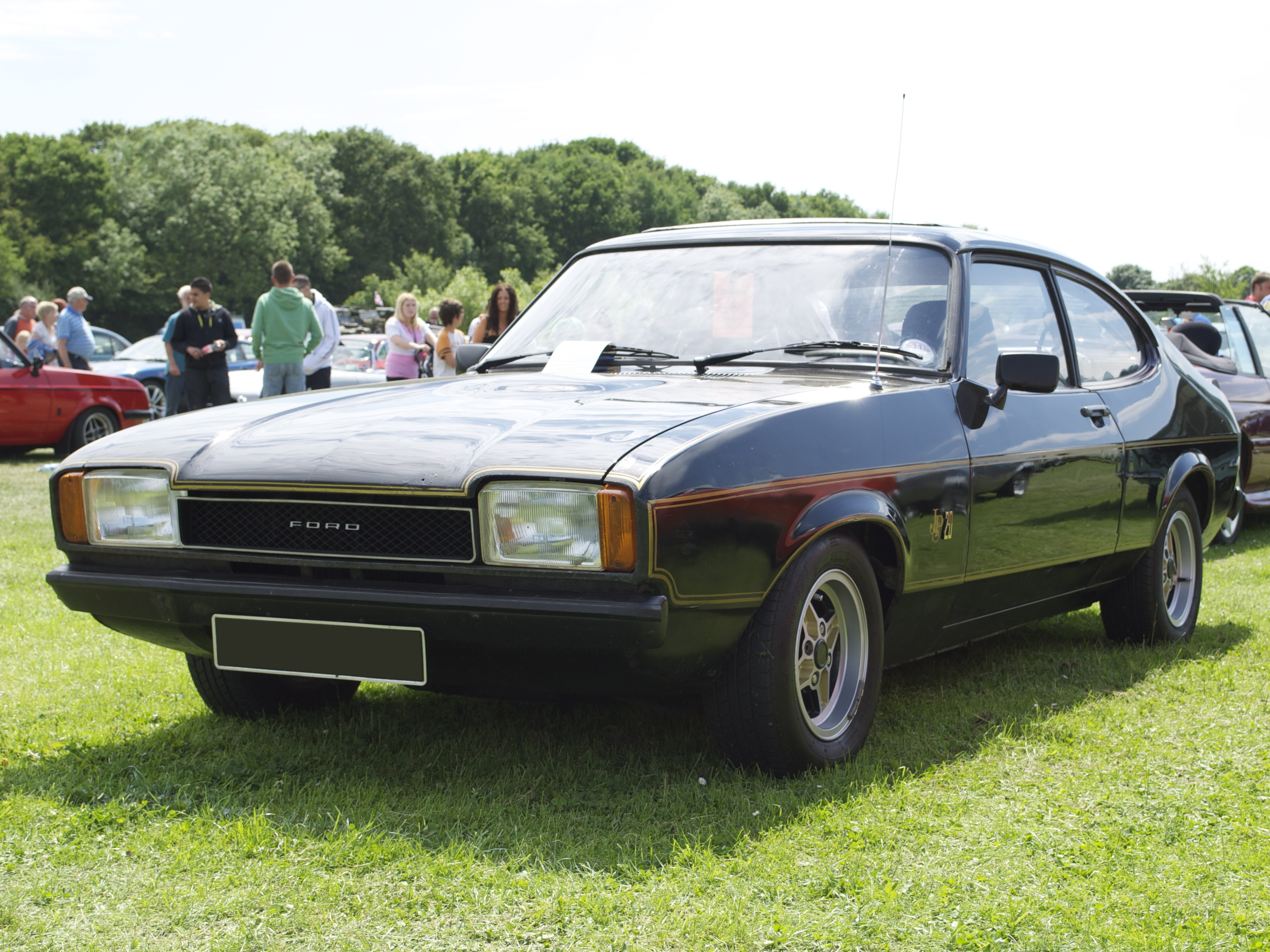
1975 Ford Capri Mk II 2.0 JPS

John Player's brands are well known in motor racing from their long association with the Formula One Team Lotus, the Forsythe Racing Champ Car team, and Norton motorcycle racing team.

Ford Europe introduced the John Player Special limited edition Capri, (known as the JPS) in March 1975. Available only in black or white, the JPS featured yards of gold pinstriping to mimic the Formula 1 livery, gold-coloured wheels, and a bespoke upgraded interior of beige cloth and carpet trimmed with black.

=== Car racing ===
John Player's sponsorship of Team Lotus began with the Lotus 49 in Gold Leaf colours in the 1968 Tasman Series. It continued with the Lotus 49 and Lotus 72 in Formula One, changed to the black and gold John Player Special colours in 1972, and ended in 1986 with the Lotus 98T, as the team switched to the Camel-sponsored yellow livery the following season.

In Australia, JPS Team BMW competed in the Australian Touring Car Championship between 1981 and 1987, with Jim Richards winning the series in 1985 and 1987. In 1981, BMW released a limited-edition road version of its 323i touring car in JPS colours to the Australian market and another in 1984.

==== North America ====
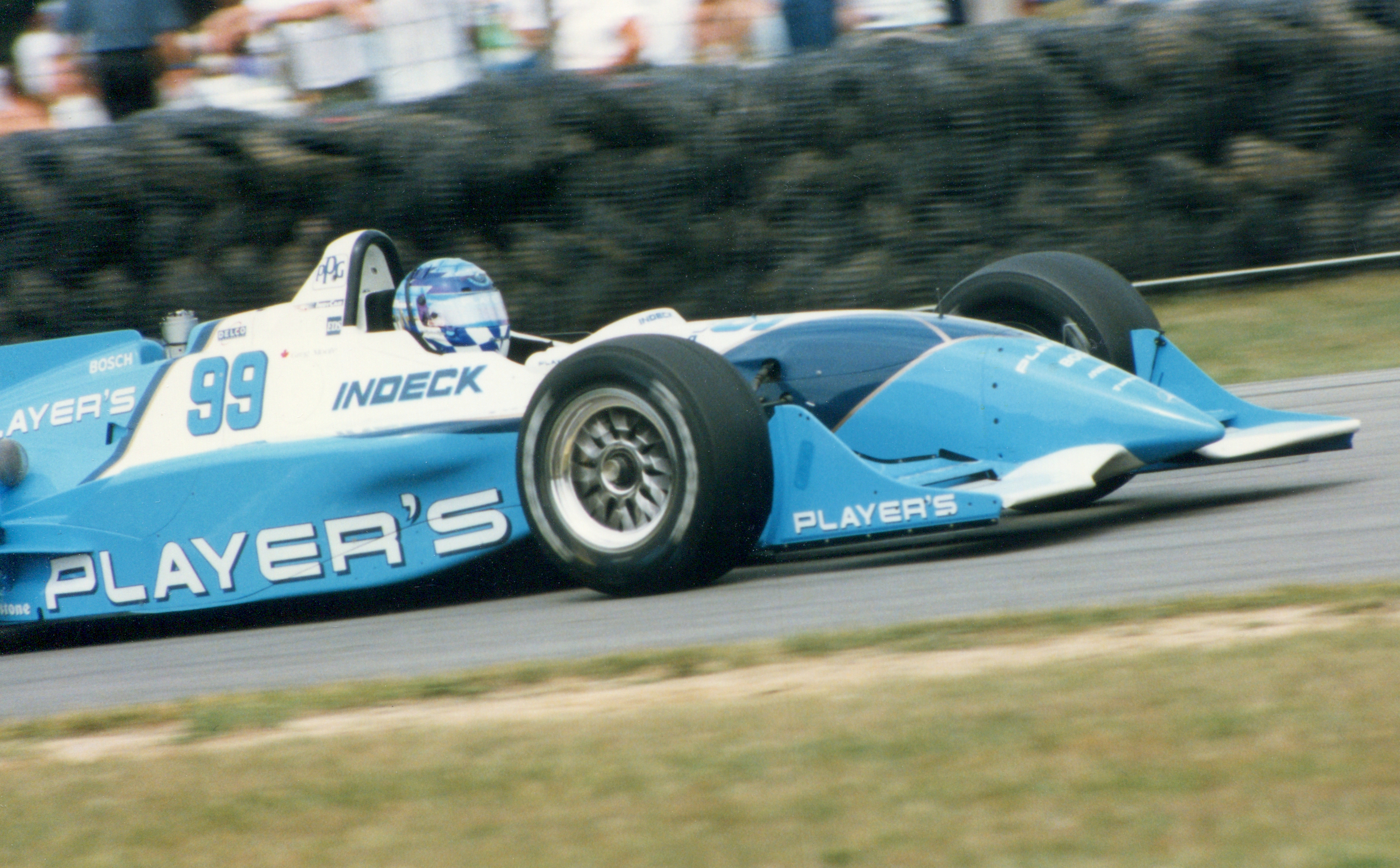
Greg Moore in a 1996 IndyCar with Player's branding

Imperial Tobacco Canada's Player's brands also sponsored Canadian auto racing for decades. After a blanket tobacco advertising ban was instituted in the Canadian Tobacco Act in 1988, Imperial created a new corporation, Player's Racing Ltd., that was strictly an auto racing promotion company. This took advantage of an exemption in the Act that allowed tobacco companies to sponsor "cultural events" using the company's proper name instead of a brand name. Player's Ltd. advertising looked nearly identical to Player's cigarette packs, and given that it was one of the few legal outlets for advertising, the company was extensively promoted both during race weekends and at other sporting events.

Player's Racing promoted a number of Canadian drivers, including 1995 Indianapolis 500 and IndyCar champion Jacques Villeneuve, whose Forsythe-Green Racing team carried a Player's Ltd livery. The team would later carry on in CART as Player's Forsythe Racing, which after the Tobacco Act was struck down as violating the Charter of Rights, was able to use Player's branding. The team was competitive and featured Canadian drivers Greg Moore, Patrick Carpentier, Alex Tagliani, and in 2003, Paul Tracy. Tracy would win the championship in 2003, just as a new Tobacco Act ban took full effect for auto racing in October 2003. The team would use a "GOODBYE, CANADA" theme for Tracy and Carpentier's final races and not have explicit Player's branding.

=== Motorcycle racing ===
John Player began sponsoring Norton motorcycle racing in November 1971. The racing was successful and Norton produced a version of the Norton Commando in John Player colours to exploit it. However, Norton's NVT parent company commercially declined and John Player withdrew sponsorship in 1974.

In the 1980s, Norton Motorcycles was revived and in 1988 John Player resumed racing sponsorship. The racing succeeded again and in 1990–91 Norton produced a road-going version of its RCW588 racer, the Norton F1. In 1991 Norton again commercially declined and John Player withdrew sponsorship for a second time.

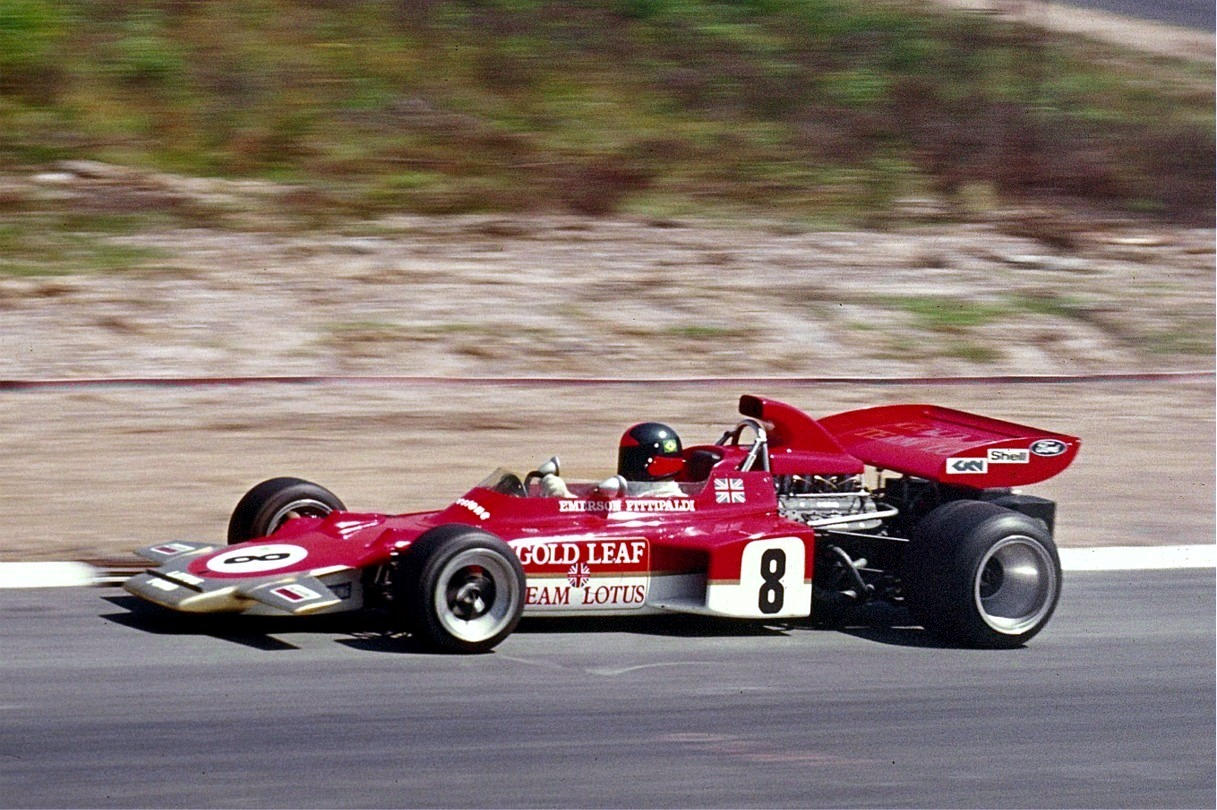
The Lotus 72 in Gold Leaf colours

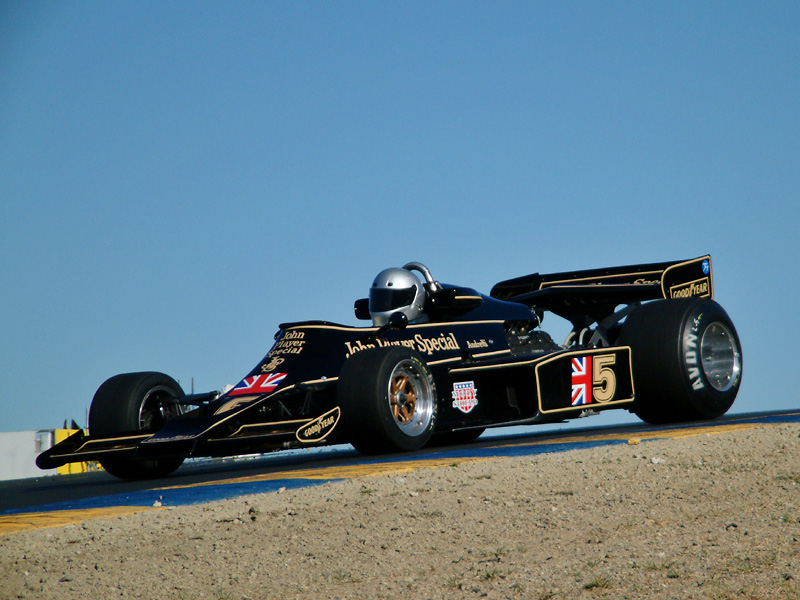
The Lotus 77 in John Player Special colours

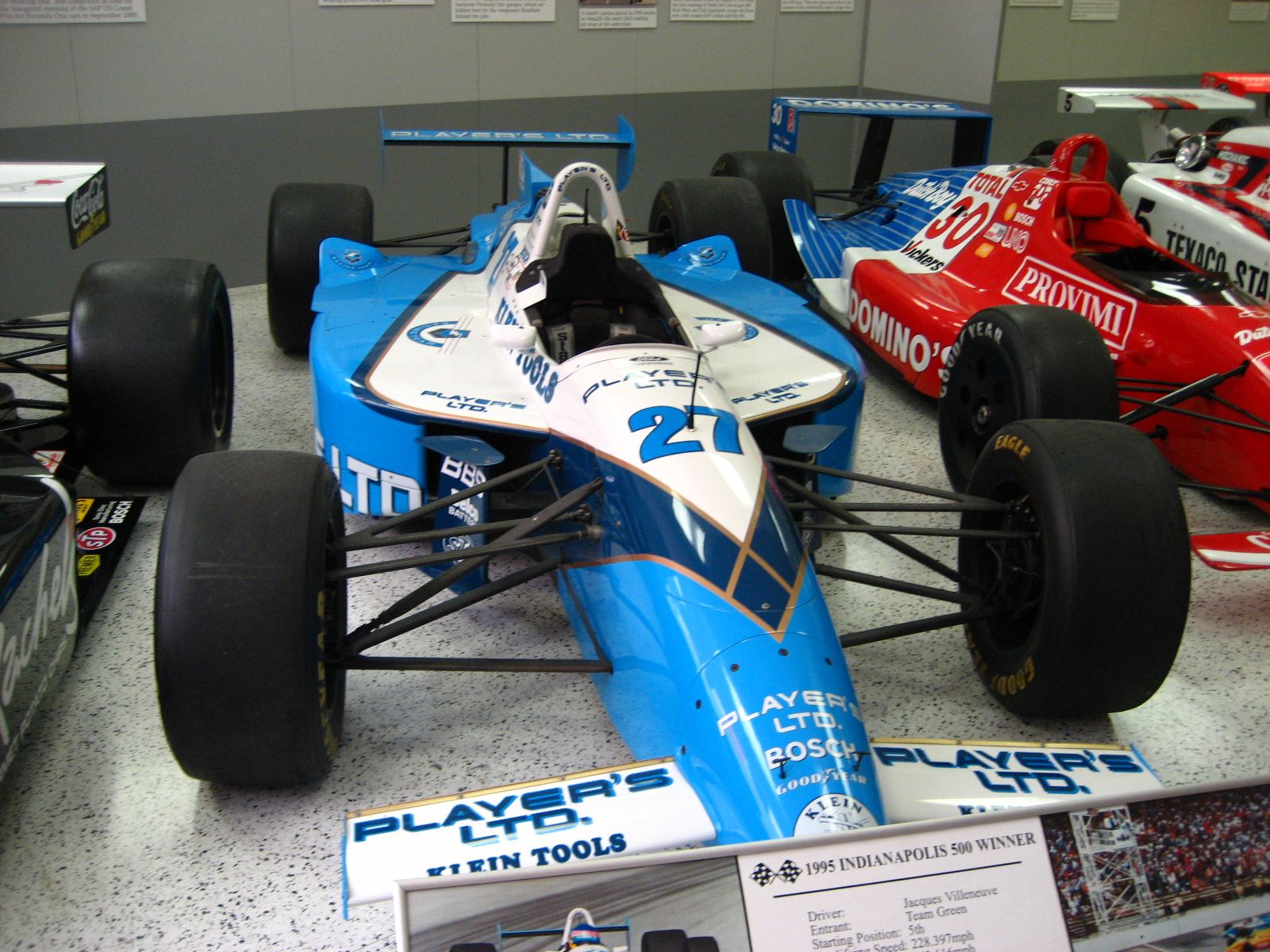
Jacques Villeneuve's 1995 Indianapolis 500-winning car in Player's Ltd. livery

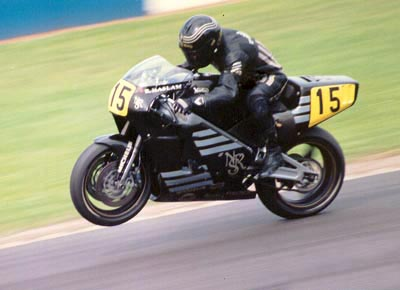
Ron Haslam on a Wankel-engined Norton RCW588 racer

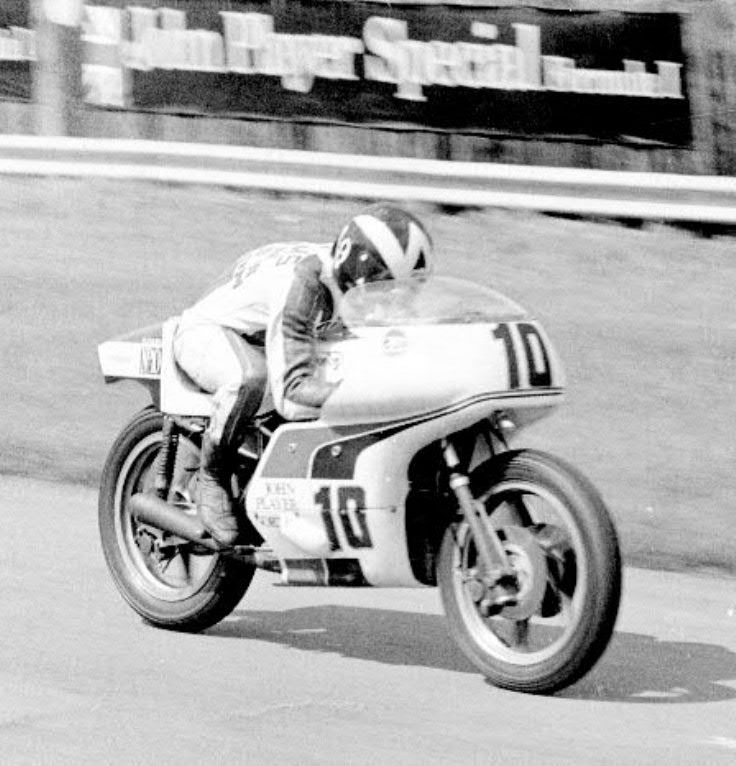
Peter Williams on the JPS-liveried 1974 Norton Commando works racer

=== Other events ===
The company also sponsored an influential series of celebrity lectures at the National Film Theatre between 1968 and 1973. Well over 100 international film stars took the stage to introduce screenings and discuss their career. The series was revived at the end of the 1970s as the Guardian Lectures.

In the 1970s Player's operated a steamboat, Hero, for promotional purposes.

Player's sponsored the Canadian Open tennis championship in the 1980s.

From 1969 to 1987 John Player sponsored the John Player Sunday League for English county cricket clubs.

== Cigarette cards ==
Player's were one of the first UK tobacco companies to include sets of general interest cards in their packs of cigarettes. One of the first sets, produced in 1893, was Castles and Abbeys. These cards were generally produced in sets of 50 and have since become highly collectable. Other sets produced include Street Cries (cries of street vendors) in 1913 and 1916; Footballers (1926); Civil Aircraft (1935); Motor Cars (1936) and a Coronation Series in 1937. John Player & Sons issued more than 200 sets of cards and some were reprinted in the 1990s.

In sports, Player's released several cards series, mostly association football collections. One of them was the "Cup Winners" series, featuring FA Cup winning teams and the illustrated "Hints on association football" in 1934, where some football movements (kicks, passes, defensive tactics, etc.) were shown. Player's also released a rugby union series in 1926, and a cricket series in 1934.

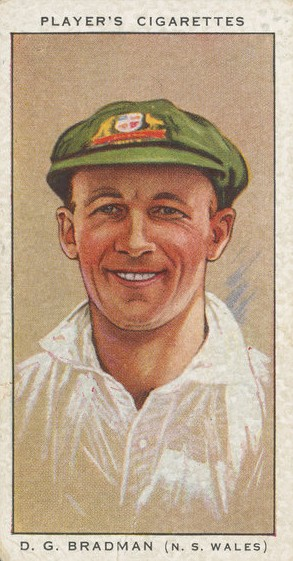
Donald Bradman from Australian Cricket Team Tour of England Series, 1934

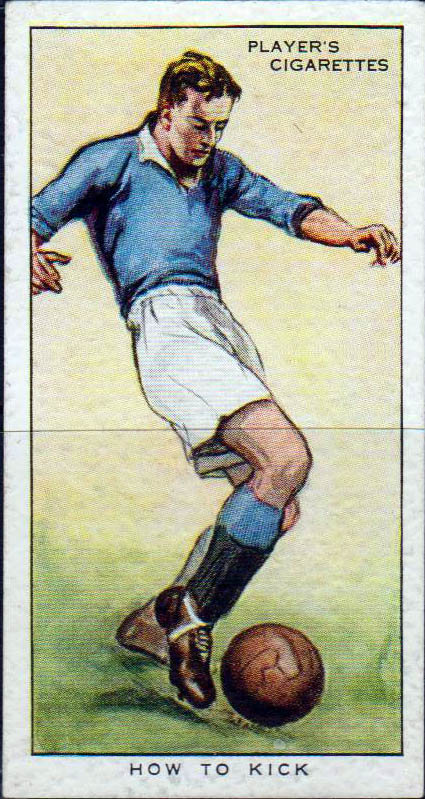
"Hints on association football" Series, 1934

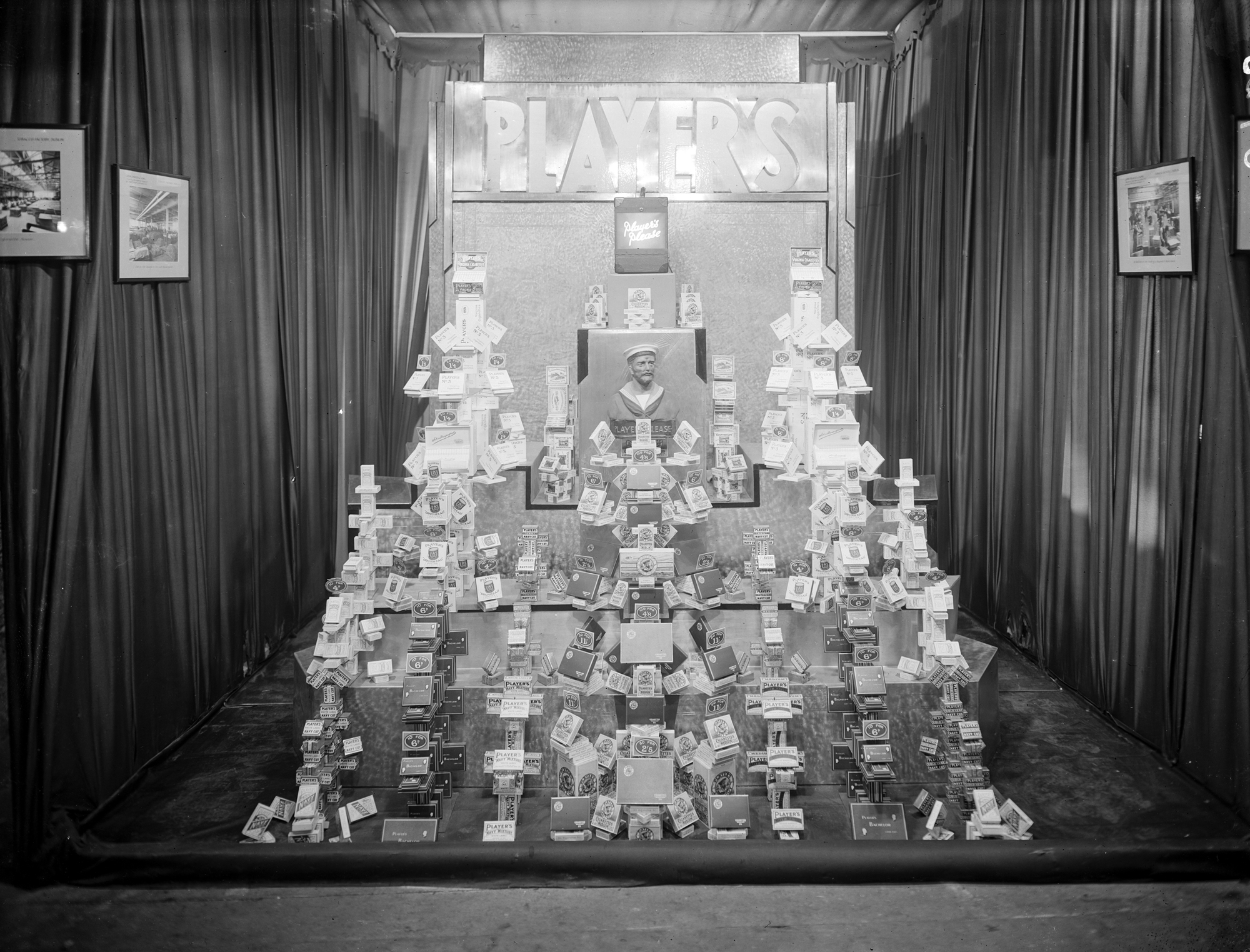
Player's cards exhibited in 1932

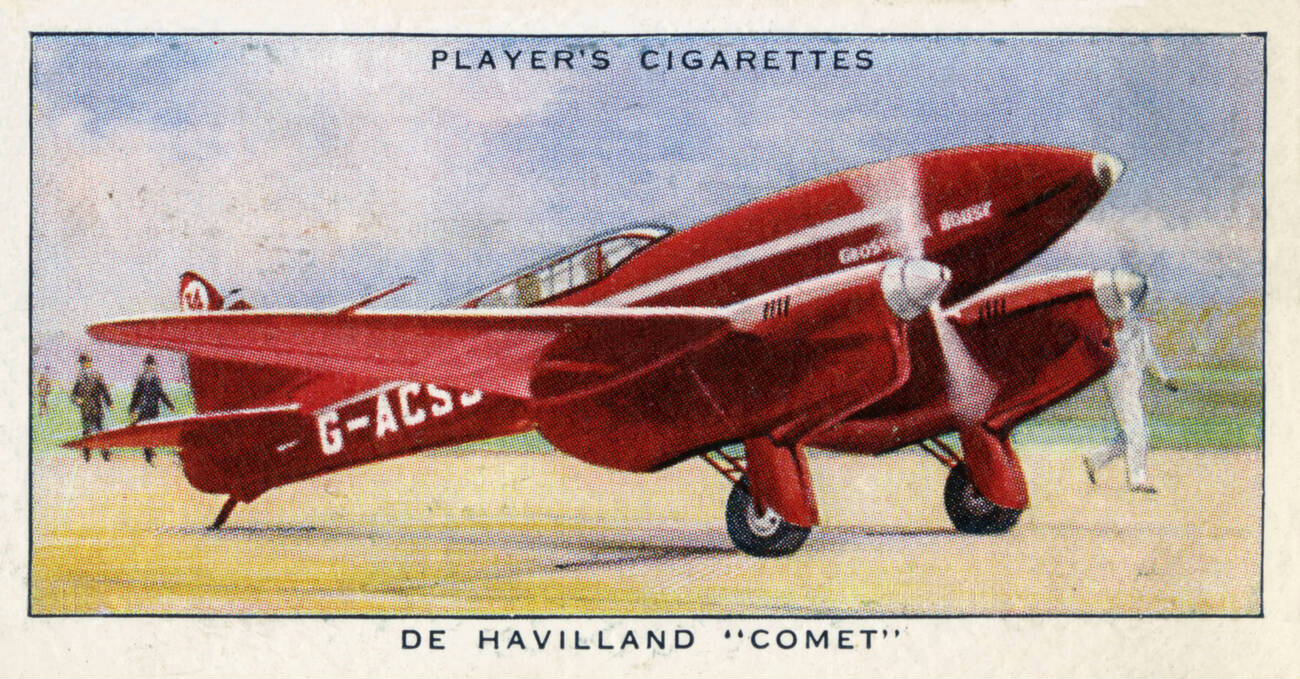
de Havilland DH.88 Comet, no. 9 of 50 from 'Civil Aircraft,' 1935

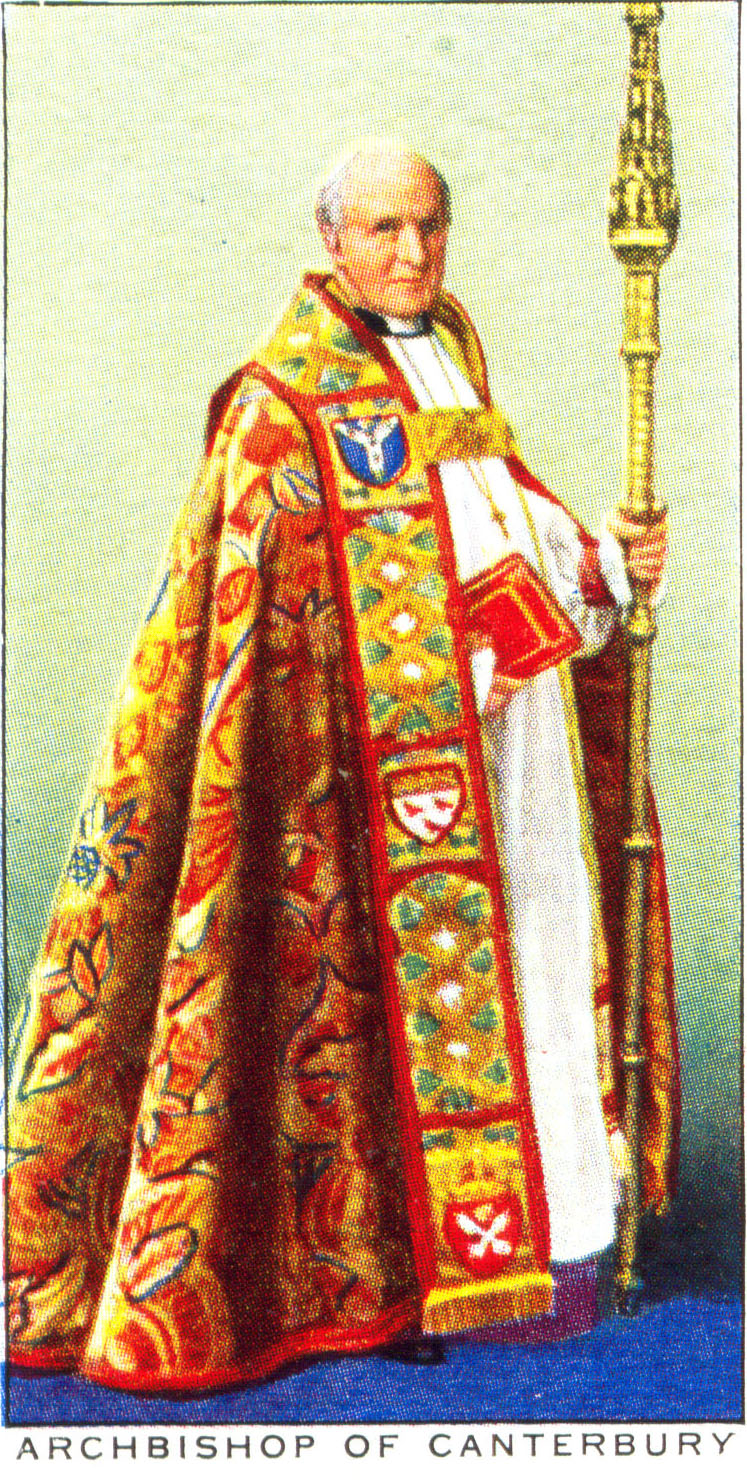
Archbishop of Canterbury from Player's Coronation Series, 1937

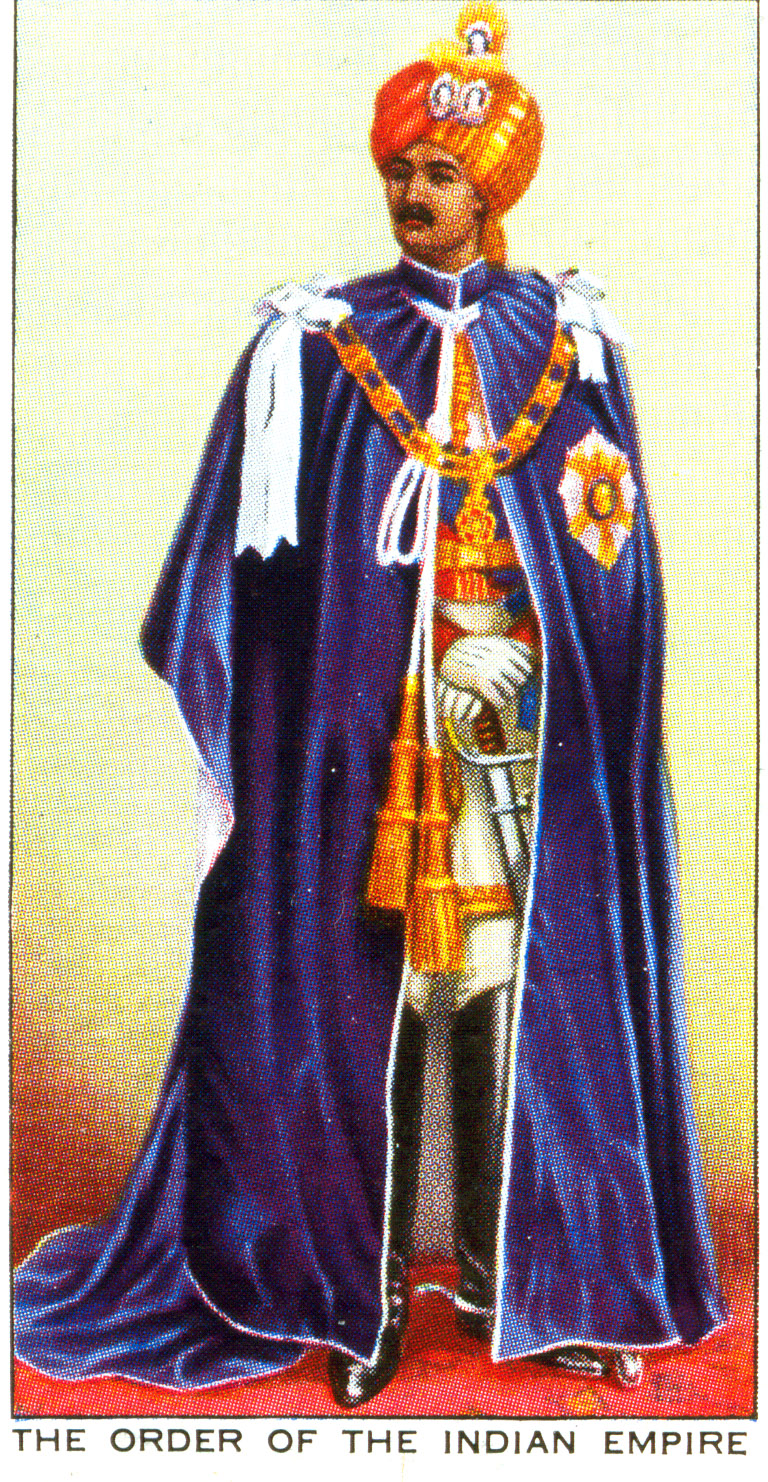
Order of the Indian Empire from Player's Coronation Series, 1937

== In popular culture ==
- The cover art for Procol Harum's 1969 album A Salty Dog and Haruomi Hosono's 1973 album Tropical Dandy are pastiches of the Player's Navy Cut sailor logo. The subject depicted there was the band's lyricist Keith Reid and was painted by "Dickinson", his wife by then.
- In Ian Fleming's 1961 James Bond novel Thunderball, Bond's love interest Domino Vitali fantasises at length about the sailor depicted on the Player's Navy Cut logo.

== Bibliography ==
- Magrath, Derek (1997) [1991]. Norton the Complete Story. Crowood Classics. Rambsbury: The Crowood Press. ISBN 1-86126-062-8.
- Pevsner, Nikolas (1979). Nottinghamshire. Harmondsworth: Yale University Press. ISBN 0300096364.
