= Formula One drivers from Uruguay =

List of Formula One drivers who competed as Uruguayian

- Drivers: 4
- Grands Prix: 6
- Entries: 7
- Starts: 6
- Best season finish: NC
- Wins: 0
- Podiums: 0
- Pole positions: 0
- Fastest laps: 0
- Points: 0
- First entry: 1952 British Grand Prix
- Latest entry: 1959 French Grand Prix
- 2026 drivers: None

There have been 4 Formula One drivers from Uruguay.

== Former drivers ==
Eitel Cantoni was the first. He entered three races in 1952: Britain, where he failed to finish; Germany, where he again failed to finish; and Italy, where he finished 11th.

Alberto Uría entered the Argentine Grands Prix of 1955 and 1956. He retired from the former and finished 6th in the latter.

Óscar González only race was a shared drive with Uría in the 1956 Argentine Grand Prix. He completed the second half of the race, finishing in 6th place, 10 laps down from the race winner and 3 laps behind the 5th-placed driver.

Asdrúbal Fontes Bayardo is the most recent Uruguayan to enter a Grand Prix. He failed to start the 1959 French Grand Prix, his only attempt at a Grand Prix.

== Timeline ==
Driver	Active years	Entries	Wins	Podiums	Career points	Poles	Fastest laps
Eitel Cantoni	1952	3	0	0	0	0	0
Alberto Uría	1955–1956	2	0	0	0	0	0
Óscar González	1956	1	0	0	0	0	0
Asdrúbal Fontes Bayardo	1959	1 (0 starts)	0	0	0	0	0
