= List of Formula One drivers =

Countries marked in gold are those that have produced Formula 1 World Drivers' Champions. Those in green produced winners of Formula 1 Grands Prix, while those in blue – only Formula 1 race participants. East Germany and West Germany are combined with modern-day Germany into one country, while modern-day Zimbabwe is highlighted as a stand-in for Rhodesia.

Formula One (F1) is the highest class of open-wheeled auto racing defined by the Fédération Internationale de l'Automobile (FIA), motorsport's world governing body. The "formula" in the name refers to a set of rules to which all participants and cars must conform. Each year, the F1 World Championship season is held. It consists of a series of races, known as Grands Prix, held usually on purpose-built circuits, and in a few cases on closed city streets. Drivers are awarded points based on their finishing position in each race, and the driver who accumulates the most points over each season is crowned that year's World Drivers' Champion. As of the 2026 São Paulo Grand Prix, there have been 784 Formula One drivers from 41 different nationalities who have started at least one of the 1,169 FIA World Championship races since the first such event, the 1950 British Grand Prix.

Seven-time champions Michael Schumacher and Lewis Hamilton hold the record for the most championships. Hamilton also holds the record for the most wins with 106, the most pole positions with 105, the most points with 5279.5, and the most podiums with 209. Fernando Alonso has entered more Grands Prix than anyone else (448) and also holds the record for the most Grand Prix starts (445). The United Kingdom is the most represented country, having produced 163 drivers. Nine countries have been represented by just one. China became the latest country to be represented by a driver when Zhou Guanyu made his Formula One debut at the 2022 Bahrain Grand Prix driving for Alfa Romeo. The most recent driver to make his Formula One debut is Rafael Câmara, who debuted at the 2026 Sao Paulo Grand Prix.

This list includes all drivers who have entered a World Championship race, including 104 participants of the Indianapolis 500 between 1950 and 1960 when it formed a round of the World Championship (although not being run according to Formula One rules or sanctioned by the FIA).

Drivers with 4 or more World Championships

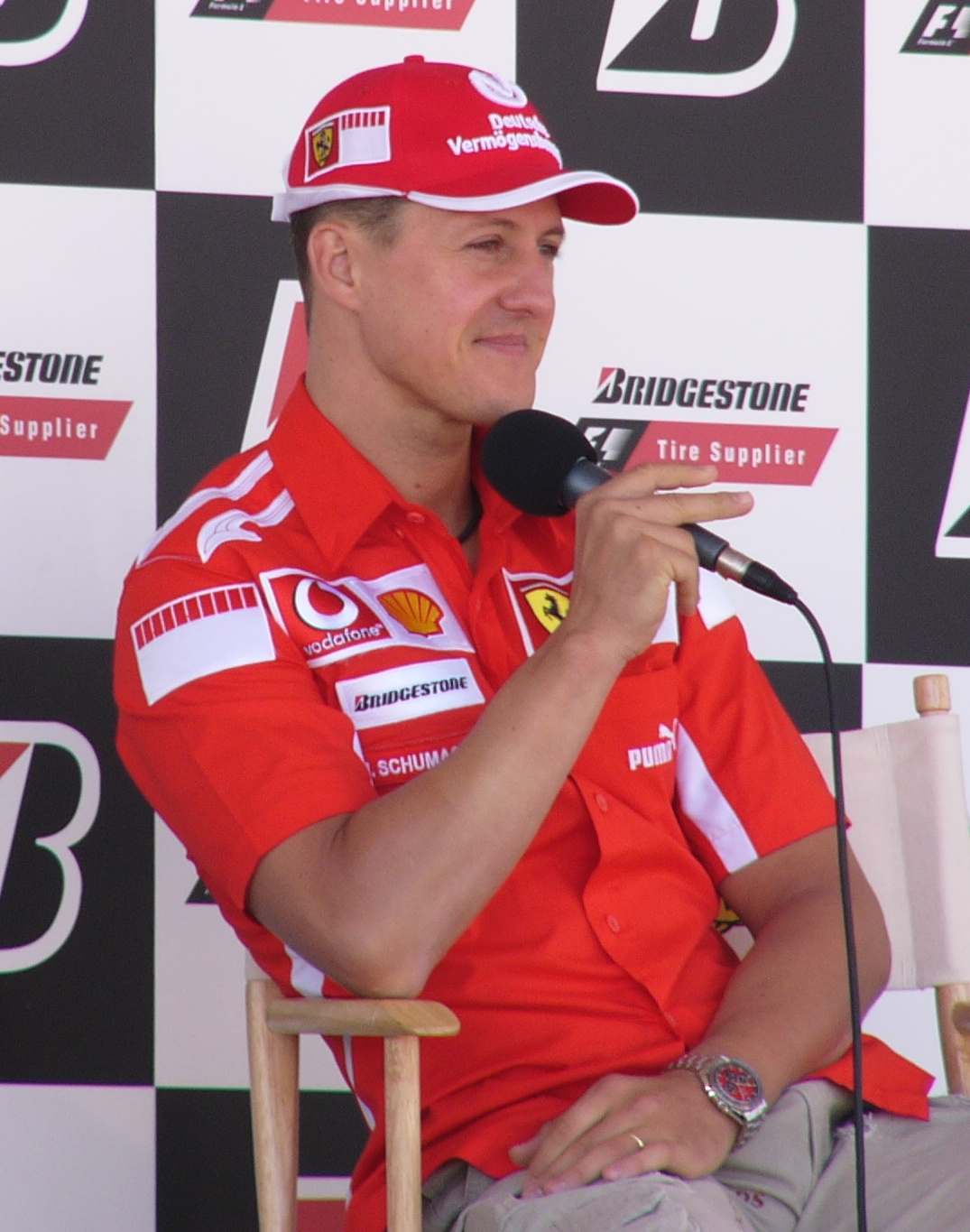
Michael Schumacher won seven World Drivers' Championship titles between 1994 and 2004.

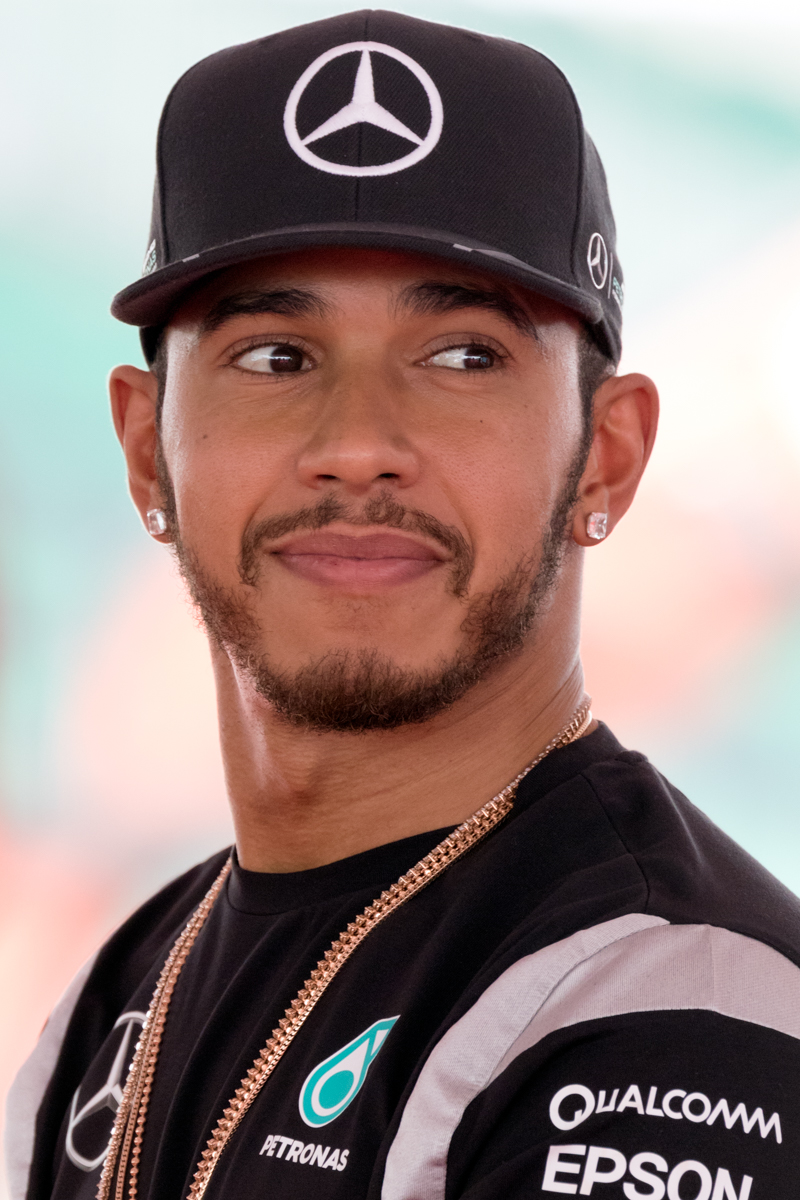
Lewis Hamilton has won seven World Drivers' Championship titles since 2008.

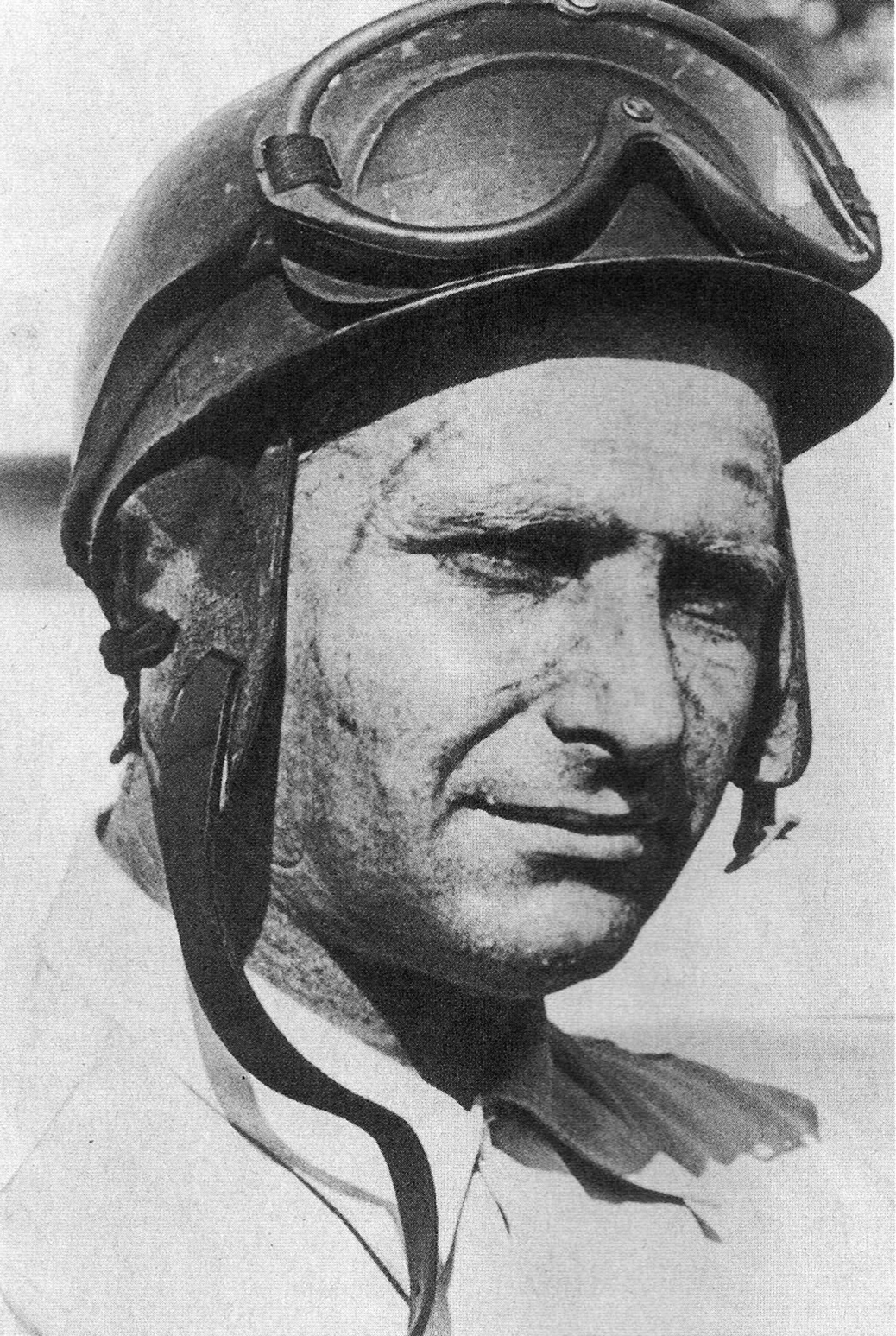
Juan Manuel Fangio won five World Drivers' Championship titles between 1951 and 1957.

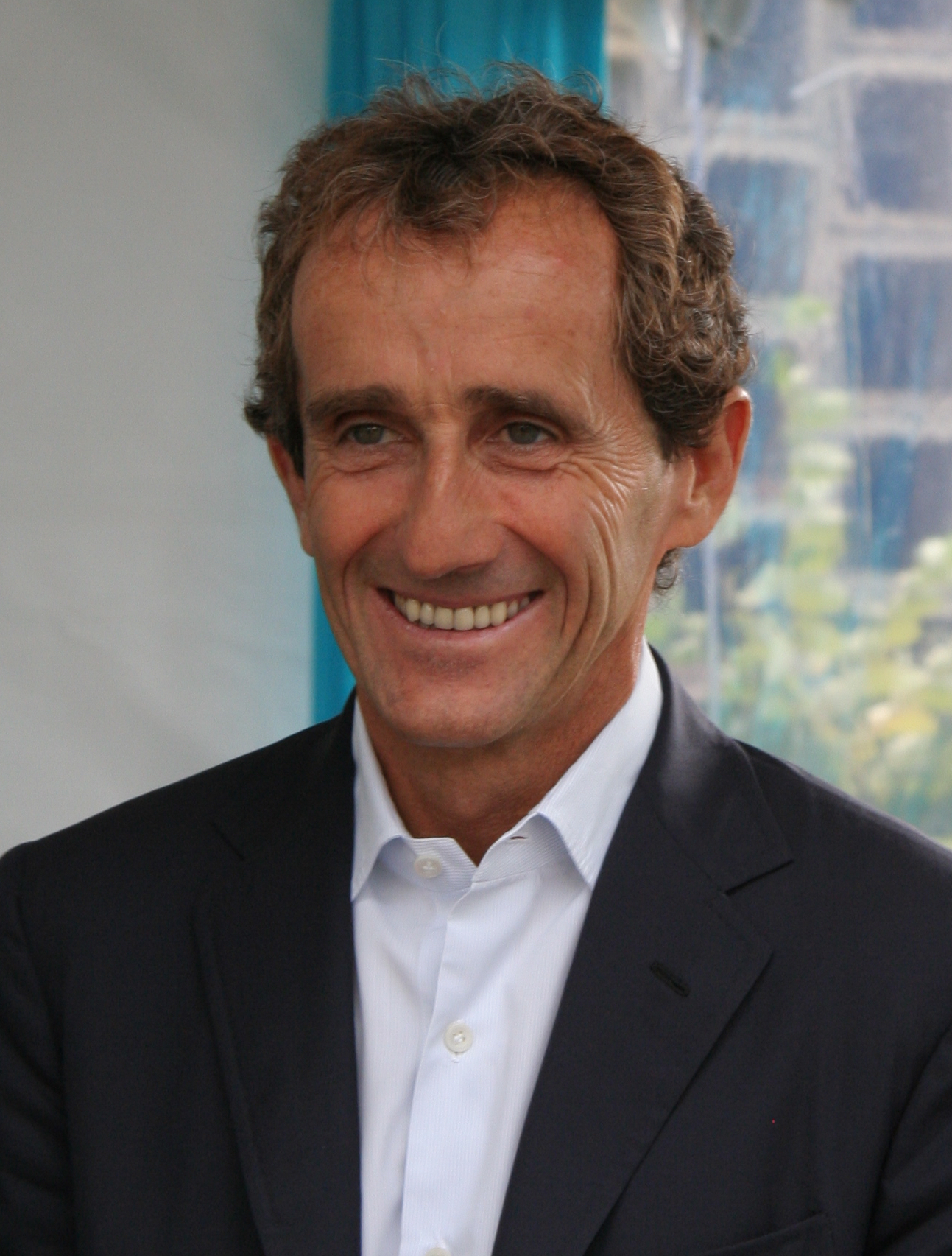
Alain Prost won four World Drivers' Championship titles between 1985 and 1993.

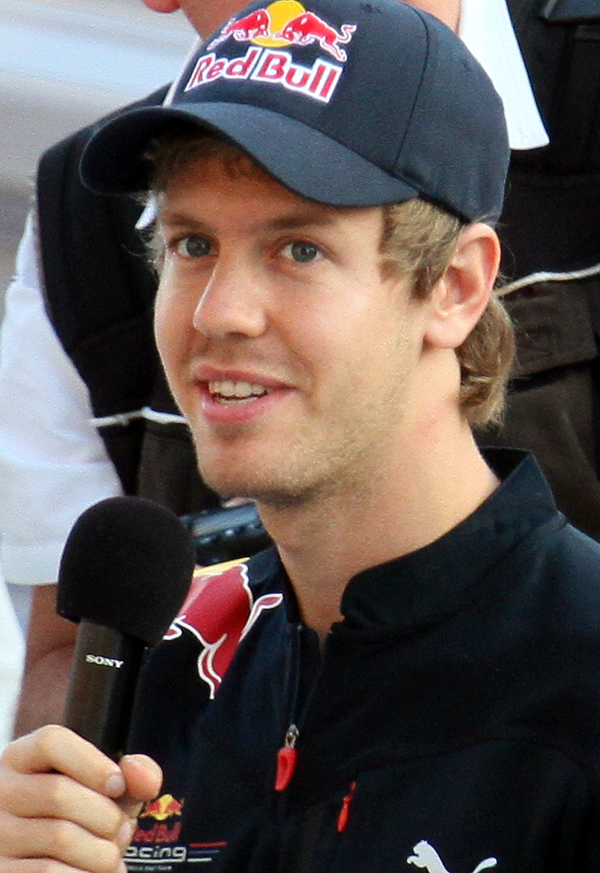
Sebastian Vettel won four consecutive World Drivers' Championship titles from 2010 to 2013.

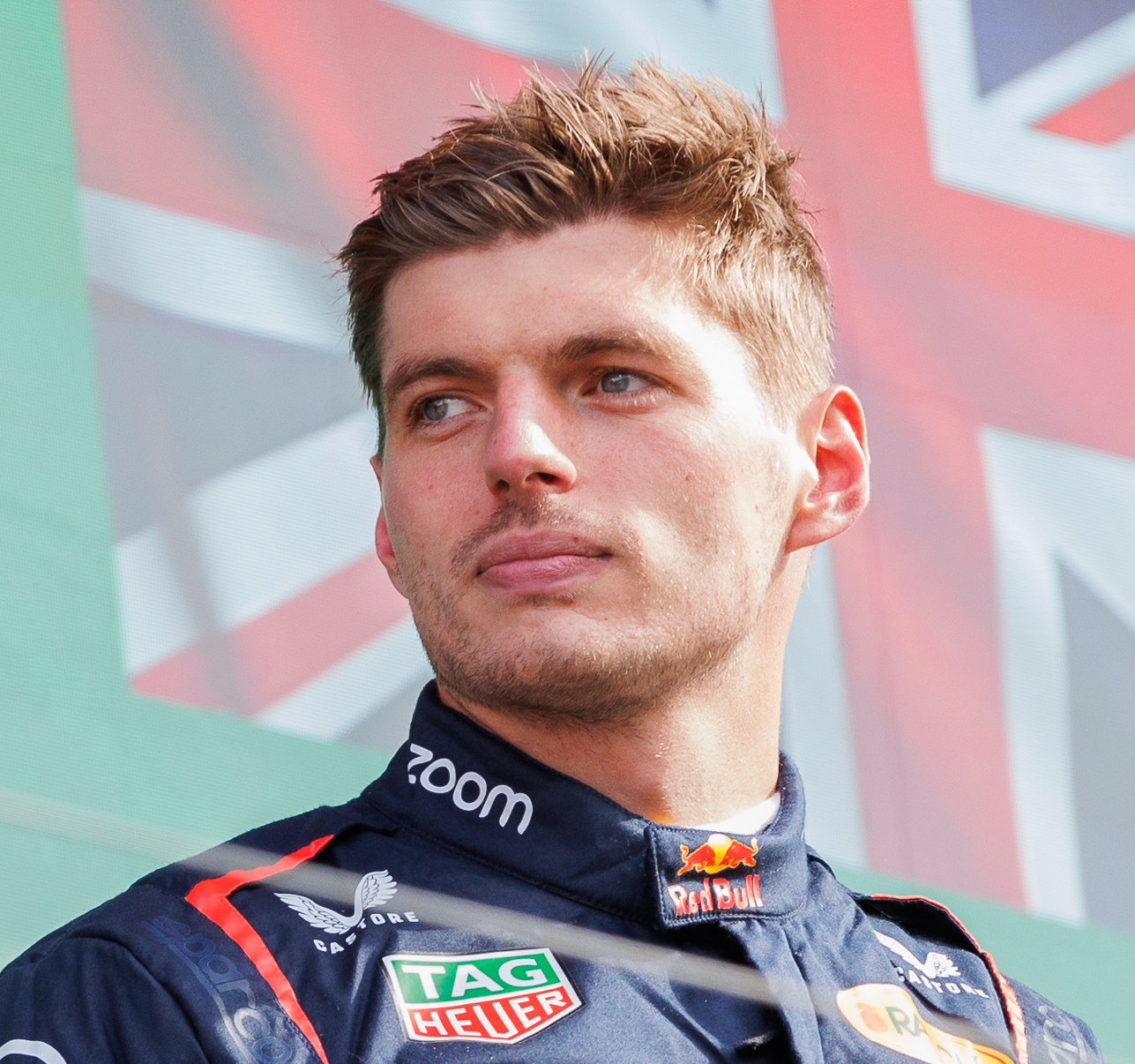
Max Verstappen won four consecutive World Drivers' Championship titles from 2021 to 2024.

== Drivers ==
Key
Symbol	Meaning
~	Driver has competed in 2026 and has won the World Drivers' Championship
*	Driver has competed in 2026 and has not won the World Drivers' Championship
^	Driver has won the World Drivers' Championship and has not competed in 2026

This list is accurate as of the 2026 São Paulo Grand Prix. Drivers who only participated in Friday practice and who were not actually entered for the race are not included.

Driver name	Nationality	Seasons competed	Drivers' Championships	Race entries	Race starts	Pole positions	Race wins	Podiums	Fastest laps	Points (Note: The number of points awarded for each finishing position has varied over the years. Also, up until 1990, not all points scored by a driver contributed to their final World Championship tally. Numbers without parentheses are points that counted towards championships; numbers in parentheses are total points scored. See list of points scoring systems for more information.)
Carlo Abate	Italy	1962–1963	0	3	0	0	0	0	0	0
George Abecassis	United Kingdom	1951–1952	0	2	2	0	0	0	0	0
Kenny Acheson	United Kingdom	1983, 1985	0	10	3	0	0	0	0	0
Charles Van Acker	United States	1950	0	1 (Note: Competed only in Indianapolis 500 events, which were included as rounds of the World Championship from 1950 to 1960.)	0	0	0	0	0	0
Andrea de Adamich	Italy	1968, 1970–1973	0	36	30	0	0	0	0	6
Philippe Adams	Belgium	1994	0	2	2	0	0	0	0	0
Walt Ader	United States	1950	0	1	1	0	0	0	0	0
Kurt Adolff	West Germany	1953	0	1	1	0	0	0	0	0
Fred Agabashian	United States	1950–1957	0	9	8	1	0	0	0	1.5
Kurt Ahrens Jr.	West Germany	1966–1969	0	4	4	0	0	0	0	0
Jack Aitken	United Kingdom	2020	0	1	1	0	0	0	0	0
Christijan Albers	Netherlands	2005–2007	0	46	46	0	0	0	0	4
Alexander Albon*	Thailand	2019–2020, 2022–2026	0	150	147	0	0	2	1	318
Michele Alboreto	Italy	1981–1994	0	215	194	2	5	23	5	186.5
Jean Alesi	France	1989–2001	0	202	201	2	1	32	4	241
Jaime Alguersuari	Spain	2009–2011	0	46	46	0	0	0	0	31
Ray Allen	United Kingdom	1972	0	1	0	0	0	0	0	0
Philippe Alliot	France	1984–1990, 1993–1994	0	116	109	0	0	0	0	7
Cliff Allison	United Kingdom	1958–1961	0	18	16	0	0	1	0	11
Fernando Alonso~	Spain	2001, 2003–2018, 2021–2026	2; 2005–2006	448	445	22	32	106	26	2400
Giovanna Amati	Italy	1992	0	3	0	0	0	0	0	0
George Amick	United States	1958	0	2	1	0	0	1	0	6
Red Amick	United States	1959–1960	0	2	2	0	0	0	0	0
Chris Amon	New Zealand	1963–1976	0	108	96	5	0	11	3	83
Bob Anderson	United Kingdom	1963–1967	0	29	25	0	0	1	0	8
Conny Andersson	Sweden	1976–1977	0	5	1	0	0	0	0	0
Emil Andres	United States	1950	0	1	0	0	0	0	0	0
Mario Andretti^	United States	1968–1972, 1974–1982	1; 1978	131	128	18	12	19	10	180
Michael Andretti	United States	1993	0	13	13	0	0	1	0	7
Keith Andrews	United States	1955–1956	0	3	2	0	0	0	0	0
Elio de Angelis	Italy	1979–1986	0	109	108	3	2	9	0	122
Kimi Antonelli~	Italy	2025–2026	1; 2026	44	44	7	9	19	11	540
Marco Apicella	Italy	1993	0	1	1	0	0	0	0	0
Mário de Araújo Cabral	Portugal	1959–1960, 1963–1964	0	5	4	0	0	0	0	0
Frank Armi	United States	1954	0	3	1	0	0	0	0	0
Chuck Arnold	United States	1959	0	2	1	0	0	0	0	0
René Arnoux	France	1978–1989	0	164	149	18	7	22	12	181
Peter Arundell	United Kingdom	1963–1964, 1966	0	13	11	0	0	2	0	12
Alberto Ascari^	Italy	1950–1955	2; 1952–1953	33	32	14	13	17 (Note: Ascari shared podium positions with Dorino Serafini (2nd, 1950 Italian Grand Prix) and José Froilán González (2nd, 1951 French Grand Prix).)	12	107.64 (140.14) (Note: Seven drivers (Alberto Ascari, Jean Behra, Juan Manuel Fangio, José Froilán González, Mike Hawthorn, Onofre Marimón and Stirling Moss) were all credited with the same fastest lap time in the 1954 British Grand Prix, which was worth 1 championship point at the time. Each was credited with 1/7 (~0.14) of a point, although this is not shown in Fangio's total as it did not contribute to his World Championship tally.)
Peter Ashdown	United Kingdom	1959	0	1	1	0	0	0	0	0
Ian Ashley	United Kingdom	1974–1977	0	11	4	0	0	0	0	0
Gerry Ashmore	United Kingdom	1961–1962	0	4	3	0	0	0	0	0
Bill Aston	United Kingdom	1952	0	3	1	0	0	0	0	0
Richard Attwood	United Kingdom	1964–1965, 1967–1969	0	17	17	0	0	1	1	11
Manny Ayulo	United States	1951–1954	0	6	4	0	0	1 (Note: Ayulo shared a podium with Jack McGrath (3rd, 1951 Indianapolis 500).)	0	2
Luca Badoer	Italy	1993, 1995–1996, 1999, 2009	0	58	50	0	0	0	0	0
Giancarlo Baghetti	Italy	1961–1967	0	21	21	0	1	1	1	14
Julian Bailey	United Kingdom	1988, 1991	0	20	7	0	0	0	0	1
Mauro Baldi	Italy	1982–1985	0	41	36	0	0	0	0	5
Bobby Ball	United States	1951–1952	0	2	2	0	0	0	0	2
Marcel Balsa	France	1952	0	1	1	0	0	0	0	0
Lorenzo Bandini	Italy	1961–1967	0	42	42	1	1	8	2	58
Henry Banks	United States	1950–1952	0	5	3	0	0	0	0	0
Fabrizio Barbazza	Italy	1991, 1993	0	20	8	0	0	0	0	2
John Barber	United Kingdom	1953	0	1	1	0	0	0	0	0
Skip Barber	United States	1971–1972	0	6	5	0	0	0	0	0
Paolo Barilla	Italy	1989–1990	0	15	9	0	0	0	0	0
Rubens Barrichello	Brazil	1993–2011	0	326	322	14	11	68	17	658
Michael Bartels	Germany	1991	0	4	0	0	0	0	0	0
Edgar Barth	East Germany, West Germany (Note: East German until 1957, then West German. Only the flag of West Germany is used here, because until 1959, the flag of East Germany looked exactly the same.)	1953, 1957–1958, 1960, 1961, 1964	0	7	5	0	0	0	0	0
Giorgio Bassi	Italy	1965	0	1	1	0	0	0	0	0
Erwin Bauer	West Germany	1953	0	1	1	0	0	0	0	0
Zsolt Baumgartner	Hungary	2003–2004	0	20	20	0	0	0	0	1
Élie Bayol	France	1952–1956	0	8	7	0	0	0	0	2
Oliver Bearman*	United Kingdom	2024–2026	0	47	47	0	0	0	0	71
Don Beauman	United Kingdom	1954	0	1	1	0	0	0	0	0
Karl-Günther Bechem (Note: Bechem competed in the 1952 German Grand Prix under the pseudonym Bernd Nacke.)	West Germany	1952–1953	0	2	2	0	0	0	0	0
Jean Behra	France	1952–1959	0	53	52	0	0	9 (Note: Behra shared a podium with Cesare Perdisa (3rd, 1955 Monaco Grand Prix).)	1	51.14
Derek Bell	United Kingdom	1968–1972, 1974	0	16	9	0	0	0	0	1
Stefan Bellof	West Germany	1984–1985	0	22	20	0	0	0	0	4
Paul Belmondo	France	1992, 1994	0	27	7	0	0	0	0	0
Tom Belsø	Denmark	1973–1974	0	5	2	0	0	0	0	0
Jean-Pierre Beltoise	France	1967–1974	0	88	86	0	1	8	4	77
Olivier Beretta	Monaco	1994	0	10	9	0	0	0	0	0
Allen Berg	Canada	1986	0	9	9	0	0	0	0	0
Georges Berger	Belgium	1953–1954	0	2	2	0	0	0	0	0
Gerhard Berger	Austria	1984–1997	0	210	210	12	10	48	21	385
Éric Bernard	France	1989–1991, 1994	0	47	45	0	0	1	0	10
Enrique Bernoldi	Brazil	2001–2002	0	29	28	0	0	0	0	0
Enrico Bertaggia	Italy	1989	0	6	0	0	0	0	0	0
Tony Bettenhausen	United States	1950–1960	0	11	11	0	0	1 (Note: Bettenhausen shared a podium with Paul Russo (2nd, 1955 Indianapolis 500).)	1	11
Mike Beuttler	United Kingdom	1971–1973	0	29	28	0	0	0	0	0
Birabongse Bhanudej	Thailand	1950–1954	0	19	19	0	0	0	0	8
Jules Bianchi	France	2013–2014	0	34	34	0	0	0	0	2
Lucien Bianchi	Belgium	1959–1963, 1965, 1968	0	19	17	0	0	1	0	6
Gino Bianco	Brazil	1952	0	4	4	0	0	0	0	0
Hans Binder	Austria	1976–1978	0	15	13	0	0	0	0	0
Clemente Biondetti	Italy	1950	0	1	1	0	0	0	0	0
Pablo Birger	Argentina	1953, 1955	0	2	2	0	0	0	0	0
Art Bisch	United States	1958	0	1	1	0	0	0	0	0
Harry Blanchard	United States	1959	0	1	1	0	0	0	0	0
Michael Bleekemolen	Netherlands	1977–1978	0	5	1	0	0	0	0	0
Alex Blignaut	South Africa	1965	0	1	0	0	0	0	0	0
Trevor Blokdyk	South Africa	1963, 1965	0	2	1	0	0	0	0	0
Mark Blundell	United Kingdom	1991, 1993–1995	0	63	61	0	0	3	0	32
Raul Boesel	Brazil	1982–1983	0	30	23	0	0	0	0	0
Menato Boffa	Italy	1961	0	1	0	0	0	0	0	0
Bob Bondurant	United States	1965–1966	0	9	9	0	0	0	0	3
Felice Bonetto	Italy	1950–1953	0	16	15	0	0	2 (Note: Bonetto shared podiums with Nino Farina (3rd, 1951 Italian Grand Prix) and José Froilán González (3rd, 1953 Dutch Grand Prix).)	0	17.5
Jo Bonnier	Sweden	1956–1971	0	108	104	1	1	1	0	39
Roberto Bonomi	Argentina	1960	0	1	1	0	0	0	0	0
Juan Manuel Bordeu	Argentina	1961	0	1	0	0	0	0	0	0
Slim Borgudd	Sweden	1981–1982	0	15	10	0	0	0	0	1
Gabriel Bortoleto*	Brazil	2025–2026	0	44	43	0	0	0	0	33
Luki Botha	South Africa	1967	0	1	1	0	0	0	0	0
Valtteri Bottas*	Finland	2013–2024, 2026	0	267	265	20	10	67	19	1797
Jean-Christophe Boullion	France	1995	0	11	11	0	0	0	0	3
Sébastien Bourdais	France	2008–2009	0	27	27	0	0	0	0	6
Thierry Boutsen	Belgium	1983–1993	0	164	163	1	3	15	1	132
Johnny Boyd	United States	1955–1960	0	6	6	0	0	1	0	4
David Brabham	Australia	1990, 1994	0	30	24	0	0	0	0	0
Gary Brabham	Australia	1990	0	2	0	0	0	0	0	0
Jack Brabham^	Australia	1955–1970	3; 1959–1960, 1966	128	126	13	14	31	12	253 (261)
Bill Brack	Canada	1968–1969, 1972	0	3	3	0	0	0	0	0
Ernesto Brambilla	Italy	1963, 1969	0	2	0	0	0	0	0	0
Vittorio Brambilla	Italy	1974–1980	0	79	74	1	1	1	1	15.5
Toni Branca	Switzerland	1950–1951	0	3	3	0	0	0	0	0
Gianfranco Brancatelli	Italy	1979	0	3	0	0	0	0	0	0
Eric Brandon	United Kingdom	1952, 1954	0	5	5	0	0	0	0	0
Don Branson	United States	1959–1960	0	2	2	0	0	0	0	3
Tom Bridger	United Kingdom	1958	0	1	1	0	0	0	0	0
Tony Brise	United Kingdom	1975	0	10	10	0	0	0	0	1
Chris Bristow	United Kingdom	1959–1960	0	4	4	0	0	0	0	0
Peter Broeker	Canada	1963	0	1	1	0	0	0	0	0
Tony Brooks	United Kingdom	1956–1961	0	39	38	3	6 (Note: Brooks shared a win with Stirling Moss (1957 British Grand Prix).)	10	3	75
Alan Brown	United Kingdom	1952–1954	0	9	8	0	0	0	0	2
Walt Brown	United States	1950–1951	0	2	2	0	0	0	0	0
Warwick Brown	Australia	1976	0	1	1	0	0	0	0	0
Adolf Brudes	West Germany	1952	0	1	1	0	0	0	0	0
Martin Brundle	United Kingdom	1984–1989, 1991–1996	0	165	158	0	0	9	0	98
Gianmaria Bruni	Italy	2004	0	18	18	0	0	0	0	0
Jimmy Bryan	United States	1952–1960	0	10	9	0	1	3	0	18
Clemar Bucci	Argentina	1954–1955	0	5	5	0	0	0	0	0
Ronnie Bucknum	United States	1964–1966	0	11	11	0	0	0	0	2
Ivor Bueb	United Kingdom	1957–1959	0	6	5	0	0	0	0	0
Sébastien Buemi	Switzerland	2009–2011	0	55	55	0	0	0	0	29
Luiz Bueno	Brazil	1973	0	1	1	0	0	0	0	0
Ian Burgess	United Kingdom	1958–1963	0	20	16	0	0	0	0	0
Luciano Burti	Brazil	2000–2001	0	15	14	0	0	0	0	0
Roberto Bussinello	Italy	1961, 1965	0	3	2	0	0	0	0	0
Jenson Button^	United Kingdom	2000–2017	1; 2009	309	306	8	15	50	8	1235
Tommy Byrne	Ireland	1982	0	5	2	0	0	0	0	0
Giulio Cabianca	Italy	1958–1960	0	4	3	0	0	0	0	3
Phil Cade	United States	1959	0	1	0	0	0	0	0	0
Alex Caffi	Italy	1986–1991	0	75	56	0	0	0	0	6
Rafael Câmara*	Brazil	2026	0	1	1	0	0	0	0	0
John Campbell-Jones	United Kingdom	1962–1963	0	2	2	0	0	0	0	0
Adrián Campos	Spain	1987-1988	0	21	17	0	0	0	0	0
John Cannon	Canada	1971	0	1	1	0	0	0	0	0
Eitel Cantoni	Uruguay	1952	0	3	3	0	0	0	0	0
Bill Cantrell	United States	1950	0	2	1	0	0	0	0	0
Ivan Capelli	Italy	1985–1993	0	98	93	0	0	3	0	31
Piero Carini	Italy	1952–1953	0	3	3	0	0	0	0	0
Duane Carter	United States	1950–1955, 1959–1960	0	8	8	0	0	1 (Note: Carter shared a podium with Sam Hanks (3rd, 1953 Indianapolis 500).)	0	6.5
Eugenio Castellotti	Italy	1955–1957	0	14	14	1	0	3	0	19.5
Johnny Cecotto	Venezuela	1983–1984	0	23	18	0	0	0	0	1
Andrea de Cesaris	Italy	1980–1994	0	214	208	1	0	5	1	59
François Cevert	France	1970–1973	0	48	47	0	1	13	2	89
Eugène Chaboud	France	1950–1951	0	3	2	0	0	0	0	1
Jay Chamberlain	United States	1962	0	3	1	0	0	0	0	0
Karun Chandhok	India	2010–2011	0	11	11	0	0	0	0	0
Alain de Changy	Belgium	1959	0	1	0	0	0	0	0	0
Colin Chapman	United Kingdom	1956	0	1	0	0	0	0	0	0
Dave Charlton	South Africa	1965, 1967–1968, 1970–1975	0	14	11	0	0	0	0	0
Pedro Chaves	Portugal	1991	0	13	0	0	0	0	0	0
Bill Cheesbourg	United States	1957–1959	0	4	3	0	0	0	0	0
Eddie Cheever	United States	1978, 1980–1989	0	143	132	0	0	9	0	70
Andrea Chiesa	Switzerland	1992	0	10	3	0	0	0	0	0
Max Chilton	United Kingdom	2013–2014	0	35	35	0	0	0	0	0
Ettore Chimeri	Venezuela	1960	0	1	1	0	0	0	0	0
Louis Chiron	Monaco	1950–1951, 1953, 1955–1956, 1958	0	19	15	0	0	1	0	4
Joie Chitwood	United States	1950	0	1	1	0	0	0	0	1
Bob Christie	United States	1956–1960	0	7	5	0	0	0	0	0
Johnny Claes	Belgium	1950–1953, 1955	0	25	23	0	0	0	0	0
David Clapham	South Africa	1965	0	1	0	0	0	0	0	0
Jim Clark^	United Kingdom	1960–1968	2; 1963, 1965	73	72	33	25	32	28	255 (274)
Kevin Cogan	United States	1980–1981	0	2	0	0	0	0	0	0
Franco Colapinto*	Argentina	2024–2026	0	47	46	0	0	0	0	32
Peter Collins	United Kingdom	1952–1958	0	35	32	0	3	9 (Note: Collins shared podiums with Juan Manuel Fangio (2nd, 1956 Monaco Grand Prix & 1956 Italian Grand Prix) and Alfonso de Portago (2nd, 1956 British Grand Prix).)	0	47
Bernard Collomb	France	1961–1964	0	6	4	0	0	0	0	0
Alberto Colombo	Italy	1978	0	3	0	0	0	0	0	0
Érik Comas	France	1991–1994	0	63	59	0	0	0	0	7
Franco Comotti	Italy	1950, 1952	0	2	2	0	0	0	0	0
George Connor	United States	1950–1952	0	4	3	0	0	0	0	0
George Constantine	United States	1959	0	1	1	0	0	0	0	0
John Cordts	Canada	1969	0	1	1	0	0	0	0	0
David Coulthard	United Kingdom	1994–2008	0	247	246	12	13	62	18	535
Piers Courage	United Kingdom	1967–1970	0	29	28	0	0	2	0	20
Chris Craft	United Kingdom	1971	0	2	1	0	0	0	0	0
Jim Crawford	United Kingdom	1975	0	2	2	0	0	0	0	0
Ray Crawford	United States	1955–1956, 1959	0	5	3	0	0	0	0	0
Alberto Crespo	Argentina	1952	0	1	0	0	0	0	0	0
Antonio Creus	Spain	1960	0	1	1	0	0	0	0	0
Larry Crockett	United States	1954	0	1	1	0	0	0	0	0
Tony Crook	United Kingdom	1952–1953	0	2	2	0	0	0	0	0
Art Cross	United States	1952–1955	0	4	4	0	0	1	0	8
Geoffrey Crossley	United Kingdom	1950	0	2	2	0	0	0	0	0
Jérôme d'Ambrosio	Belgium	2011–2012	0	20	20	0	0	0	0	0
Chuck Daigh	United States	1960	0	6	3	0	0	0	0	0
Yannick Dalmas	France	1987–1990, 1994	0	49	24	0	0	0	0	0
Derek Daly	Ireland	1978–1982	0	64	49	0	0	0	0	15
Christian Danner	West Germany	1985–1987, 1989	0	47	36	0	0	0	0	4
Jorge Daponte	Argentina	1954	0	3	2	0	0	0	0	0
Anthony Davidson	United Kingdom	2002, 2005, 2007–2008	0	24	24	0	0	0	0	0
Jimmy Davies	United States	1950–1951, 1953–1955	0	8	5	0	0	1	0	4
Colin Davis	United Kingdom	1959	0	2	2	0	0	0	0	0
Jimmy Daywalt	United States	1953–1957, 1959	0	10	6	0	0	0	0	0
Jean-Denis Delétraz	Switzerland	1994–1995	0	3	3	0	0	0	0	0
Patrick Depailler	France	1972, 1974–1980	0	95	95	1	2	19	4	139 (141)
Pedro Diniz	Brazil	1995–2000	0	99	98	0	0	0	0	10
Duke Dinsmore	United States	1950–1951, 1953, 1956	0	6	3	0	0	0	0	0
Frank Dochnal	United States	1963	0	1	0	0	0	0	0	0
José Dolhem	France	1974	0	3	1	0	0	0	0	0
Martin Donnelly	United Kingdom	1989–1990	0	15	13	0	0	0	0	0
Mark Donohue	United States	1971, 1974–1975	0	16	14	0	0	1	0	8
Jack Doohan	Australia	2024–2025	0	7	7	0	0	0	0	0
Robert Doornbos	Monaco; Netherlands	2005–2006	0	11	11	0	0	0	0	0
Ken Downing	United Kingdom	1952	0	2	2	0	0	0	0	0
Bob Drake	United States	1960	0	1	1	0	0	0	0	0
Paddy Driver	South Africa	1963, 1974	0	2	1	0	0	0	0	0
Piero Drogo	Italy	1960	0	1	1	0	0	0	0	0
Bernard de Dryver	Belgium	1977–1978	0	2	0	0	0	0	0	0
Johnny Dumfries	United Kingdom	1986	0	16	15	0	0	0	0	3
Len Duncan	United States	1954	0	4	1	0	0	0	0	0
Piero Dusio	Italy	1952	0	1	0	0	0	0	0	0
George Eaton	Canada	1969–1971	0	13	11	0	0	0	0	0
Bernie Ecclestone	United Kingdom	1958	0	2	0	0	0	0	0	0
Don Edmunds	United States	1957	0	2	1	0	0	0	0	0
Guy Edwards	United Kingdom	1974, 1976–1977	0	17	11	0	0	0	0	0
Vic Elford	United Kingdom	1968–1969, 1971	0	13	13	0	0	0	0	8
Ed Elisian	United States	1954–1958	0	5	5	0	0	0	0	0
Paul Emery	United Kingdom	1956, 1958	0	2	1	0	0	0	0	0
Tomáš Enge	Czech Republic	2001	0	3	3	0	0	0	0	0
Paul England	Australia	1957	0	1	1	0	0	0	0	0
Marcus Ericsson	Sweden	2014–2018	0	97	97	0	0	0	0	18
Harald Ertl	Austria	1975–1978, 1980	0	28	19	0	0	0	0	0
Nasif Estéfano	Argentina	1960, 1962	0	2	1	0	0	0	0	0
Philippe Étancelin	France	1950–1952	0	12	12	0	0	0	0	3
Bob Evans	United Kingdom	1975–1976	0	12	10	0	0	0	0	0
Corrado Fabi	Italy	1983–1984	0	18	12	0	0	0	0	0
Teo Fabi	Italy	1982, 1984–1987	0	71	64	3	0	2	2	23
Pascal Fabre	France	1987	0	14	11	0	0	0	0	0
Carlo Facetti	Italy	1974	0	1	0	0	0	0	0	0
Luigi Fagioli	Italy	1950–1951	0	7	7	0	1 (Note: Fagioli shared a win with Juan Manuel Fangio (1951 French Grand Prix).)	6	0	28 (32)
Jack Fairman	United Kingdom	1953, 1955–1961	0	13	12	0	0	0	0	5
Juan Manuel Fangio^	Argentina	1950–1951, 1953–1958	5; 1951, 1954–1957	52	51	29	24 (Note: Fangio shared wins with Luigi Fagioli (1951 French Grand Prix) and Luigi Musso (1956 Argentine Grand Prix).)	35 (Note: Fangio shared podiums with Peter Collins (2nd, 1956 Monaco Grand Prix & 1956 Italian Grand Prix.)	23	245 (277.64)
Nino Farina^	Italy	1950–1955	1; 1950	34	33	5	5	20 (Note: Farina shared podiums with José Froilán González/Maurice Trintignant (2nd, 1955 Argentine Grand Prix), Felice Bonetto (3rd, 1951 Italian Grand Prix) and Maurice Trintignant/Umberto Maglioli (3rd, 1955 Argentine Grand Prix).)	5	115.33 (127.33)
Walt Faulkner	United States	1950–1951, 1953–1955	0	6	5	1	0	0	0	1
William Ferguson	South Africa	1972	0	1	0	0	0	0	0	0
Maria Teresa de Filippis	Italy	1958–1959	0	5	3	0	0	0	0	0
Ralph Firman	Ireland	2003	0	15	14	0	0	0	0	1
Ludwig Fischer	West Germany	1952	0	1	0	0	0	0	0	0
Rudi Fischer	Switzerland	1951–1952	0	8	7	0	0	2	0	10
Mike Fisher	United States	1967	0	2	1	0	0	0	0	0
Giancarlo Fisichella	Italy	1996–2009	0	231	229	4	3	19	2	275
John Fitch	United States	1953, 1955	0	2	2	0	0	0	0	0
Christian Fittipaldi	Brazil	1992–1994	0	43	40	0	0	0	0	12
Emerson Fittipaldi^	Brazil	1970–1980	2; 1972, 1974	149	144	6	14	35	6	281
Pietro Fittipaldi	Brazil	2020	0	2	2	0	0	0	0	0
Wilson Fittipaldi	Brazil	1972–1973, 1975	0	38	35	0	0	0	0	3
Theo Fitzau	East Germany	1953	0	1	1	0	0	0	0	0
Pat Flaherty	United States	1950, 1953–1956, 1959	0	6	6	1	1	1	0	8
Jan Flinterman	Netherlands	1952	0	1	1	0	0	0	0	0
Ron Flockhart	United Kingdom	1954, 1956–1960	0	14	12	0	0	1	0	5
Myron Fohr	United States	1950	0	1	1	0	0	0	0	0
Gregor Foitek	Switzerland	1989–1990	0	22	7	0	0	0	0	0
George Follmer	United States	1973	0	13	12	0	0	1	0	5
George Fonder	United States	1952, 1954	0	5	2	0	0	0	0	0
Norberto Fontana	Argentina	1997	0	4	4	0	0	0	0	0
Asdrúbal Fontes Bayardo	Uruguay	1959	0	1	0	0	0	0	0	0
Carl Forberg	United States	1951	0	3	1	0	0	0	0	0
Gene Force	United States	1951, 1960	0	5	2	0	0	0	0	0
Franco Forini	Switzerland	1987	0	3	2	0	0	0	0	0
Philip Fotheringham-Parker	United Kingdom	1951	0	1	1	0	0	0	0	0
A. J. Foyt	United States	1958–1960	0	3	3	0	0	0	0	0
Giorgio Francia	Italy	1977, 1981	0	2	0	0	0	0	0	0
Don Freeland	United States	1953–1960	0	8	8	0	0	1	0	4
Heinz-Harald Frentzen	Germany	1994–2003	0	160	156	2	3	18	6	174
Paul Frère	Belgium	1952–1956	0	11	10	0	0	1	0	11
Patrick Friesacher	Austria	2005	0	11	11	0	0	0	0	3
Joe Fry	United Kingdom	1950	0	1	1	0	0	0	0	0
Hiroshi Fushida	Japan	1975	0	2	0	0	0	0	0	0
Beppe Gabbiani	Italy	1978, 1981	0	17	3	0	0	0	0	0
Bertrand Gachot	Belgium; France	1989–1992, 1994–1995	0	84	47	0	0	0	1	5
Patrick Gaillard	France	1979	0	5	2	0	0	0	0	0
Divina Galica	United Kingdom	1976, 1978	0	3	0	0	0	0	0	0
Nanni Galli	Italy	1970–1973	0	20	17	0	0	0	0	0
Oscar Alfredo Gálvez	Argentina	1953	0	1	1	0	0	0	0	2
Fred Gamble	United States	1960	0	1	1	0	0	0	0	0
Howden Ganley	New Zealand	1971–1974	0	41	35	0	0	0	0	10
Giedo van der Garde	Netherlands	2013	0	19	19	0	0	0	0	0
Frank Gardner	Australia	1964–1965, 1968	0	9	8	0	0	0	0	0
Billy Garrett	United States	1956, 1958	0	3	2	0	0	0	0	0
Jo Gartner	Austria	1984	0	8	8	0	0	0	0	0
Pierre Gasly*	France	2017–2026	0	198	197	1	1	5	3	500
Tony Gaze	Australia	1952	0	4	3	0	0	0	0	0
Geki	Italy	1964–1966	0	3	2	0	0	0	0	0
Olivier Gendebien	Belgium	1956, 1958–1961	0	15	14	0	0	2	0	18
Marc Gené	Spain	1999–2000, 2003–2004	0	36	36	0	0	0	0	5
Elmer George	United States	1957	0	3	1	0	0	0	0	0
Bob Gerard	United Kingdom	1950–1951, 1953–1954, 1956–1957	0	8	8	0	0	0	0	0
Gerino Gerini	Italy	1956, 1958	0	7	5	0	0	0	0	1.5
Peter Gethin	United Kingdom	1970–1974	0	31	30	0	1	1	0	11
Piercarlo Ghinzani	Italy	1981, 1983–1989	0	111	74	0	0	0	0	2
Bruno Giacomelli	Italy	1977–1983, 1990	0	82	69	1	0	1	0	14
Dick Gibson	United Kingdom	1957–1958	0	2	2	0	0	0	0	0
Gimax	Italy	1978	0	1	0	0	0	0	0	0
Richie Ginther	United States	1960–1967	0	54	52	0	1	14	3	102 (107)
Antonio Giovinazzi	Italy	2017, 2019–2021	0	62	62	0	0	0	0	21
Yves Giraud-Cabantous	France	1950–1953	0	13	13	0	0	0	0	5
Ignazio Giunti	Italy	1970	0	4	4	0	0	0	0	3
Timo Glock	Germany	2004, 2008–2012	0	95	91	0	0	3	1	51
Helm Glöckler	West Germany	1953	0	1	0	0	0	0	0	0
Paco Godia	Spain	1951, 1954, 1956–1958	0	14	13	0	0	0	0	6
Carel Godin de Beaufort	Netherlands	1957–1964	0	31	28	0	0	0	0	4
Christian Goethals	Belgium	1958	0	1	1	0	0	0	0	0
Paul Goldsmith	United States	1958–1960	0	3	3	0	0	1	0	6
José Froilán González	Argentina	1950–1957, 1960	0	26	26	3	2	15 (Note: González shared podiums with Alberto Ascari (2nd, 1951 French Grand Prix), Mike Hawthorn (2nd, 1954 German Grand Prix), Nino Farina/Maurice Trintignant (2nd, 1955 Argentine Grand Prix, Felice Bonetto (3rd, 1953 Dutch Grand Prix) and Umberto Maglioli (3rd, 1954 Italian Grand Prix).)	6	72.14 (77.64)
Óscar González	Uruguay	1956	0	1	1	0	0	0	0	0
Aldo Gordini	France	1951	0	1	1	0	0	0	0	0
Horace Gould	United Kingdom	1954–1958, 1960	0	18	14	0	0	0	0	2
Jean-Marc Gounon	France	1993–1994	0	9	9	0	0	0	0	0
Emmanuel de Graffenried	Switzerland	1950–1954, 1956	0	23	22	0	0	0	0	9
Lucas di Grassi	Brazil	2010	0	19	18	0	0	0	0	0
Cecil Green	United States	1950–1951	0	2	2	0	0	0	0	3
Keith Greene	United Kingdom	1959–1962	0	6	3	0	0	0	0	0
Masten Gregory	United States	1957–1963, 1965	0	43	38	0	0	3	0	21
Cliff Griffith	United States	1951–1952, 1956	0	7	3	0	0	0	0	0
Georges Grignard	France	1951	0	1	1	0	0	0	0	0
Bobby Grim	United States	1959–1960	0	2	2	0	0	0	0	0
Romain Grosjean	France	2009, 2012–2020	0	181	179	0	0	10	1	391
Olivier Grouillard	France	1989–1992	0	62	41	0	0	0	0	1
Brian Gubby	United Kingdom	1965	0	1	0	0	0	0	0	0
André Guelfi	France	1958	0	1	1	0	0	0	0	0
Miguel Ángel Guerra	Argentina	1981	0	4	1	0	0	0	0	0
Roberto Guerrero	Colombia	1982–1983	0	29	21	0	0	0	0	0
Maurício Gugelmin	Brazil	1988–1992	0	80	74	0	0	1	1	10
Dan Gurney	United States	1959–1968, 1970	0	87	86	3	4	19	6	133
Esteban Gutiérrez	Mexico	2013–2014, 2016	0	59	59	0	0	0	1	6
Hubert Hahne	West Germany	1967–1968, 1970	0	5	3	0	0	0	0	0
Isack Hadjar*	France	2025–2026	0	41	40	0	0	4	0	173
Mike Hailwood	United Kingdom	1963–1965, 1971–1974	0	50	50	0	0	2	1	29
Mika Häkkinen^	Finland	1991–2001	2; 1998–1999	165	161	26	20	51	25	420
Bruce Halford	United Kingdom	1956–1957, 1959–1960	0	9	8	0	0	0	0	0
Jim Hall	United States	1960–1963	0	12	11	0	0	0	0	3
Duncan Hamilton	United Kingdom	1951–1953	0	5	5	0	0	0	0	0
Lewis Hamilton~	United Kingdom	2007–2026	7; 2008, 2014–2015, 2017–2020	400	400	105	106	209	70	5279.5
David Hampshire	United Kingdom	1950	0	2	2	0	0	0	0	0
Sam Hanks	United States	1950–1957	0	8	8	0	1	4 (Note: Hanks shared a podium with Duane Carter (3rd, 1953 Indianapolis 500).)	0	20
Walt Hansgen	United States	1961, 1964	0	2	2	0	0	0	0	2
Mike Harris	South Africa	1962	0	1	1	0	0	0	0	0
Cuth Harrison	United Kingdom	1950	0	3	3	0	0	0	0	0
Brian Hart	United Kingdom	1967	0	1	1	0	0	0	0	0
Brendon Hartley	New Zealand	2017–2018	0	25	25	0	0	0	0	4
Gene Hartley	United States	1950, 1952–1960	0	10	8	0	0	0	0	0
Rio Haryanto	Indonesia	2016	0	12	12	0	0	0	0	0
Masahiro Hasemi	Japan	1976	0	1	1	0	0	0	0 (Note: It was initially announced that Masahiro Hasemi set the fastest lap at the 1976 Japanese Grand Prix, but it was a measurement mistake, and, several days later, the circuit issued a press release to correct the fastest lap holder of the race to Jacques Laffite. This press release was promptly made known in Japan, and the Japan Automobile Federation (JAF) and Japanese media corrected the record. But this correction was not made well known outside Japan, thus, Hasemi is credited with the fastest lap of the race in many record books.)	0
Naoki Hattori	Japan	1991	0	2	0	0	0	0	0	0
Paul Hawkins	Australia	1965	0	3	3	0	0	0	0	0
Mike Hawthorn^	United Kingdom	1952–1958	1; 1958	47	45	4	3	18 (Note: Hawthorn shared a podium with José Froilán González (2nd, 1954 German Grand Prix).)	6	112.64 (127.64)
Boy Hayje	Netherlands	1976–1977	0	7	3	0	0	0	0	0
Willi Heeks	West Germany	1952–1953	0	2	2	0	0	0	0	0
Nick Heidfeld	Germany	2000–2011	0	185	183	1	0	13	2	259
Theo Helfrich	West Germany	1952–1954	0	3	3	0	0	0	0	0
Mack Hellings	United States	1950–1951	0	2	2	0	0	0	0	0
Brian Henton	United Kingdom	1975, 1977, 1981–1982	0	37	19	0	0	0	1	0
Johnny Herbert	United Kingdom	1989–2000	0	165	160	0	3	7	0	98
Al Herman	United States	1955–1957, 1959–1960	0	8	5	0	0	0	0	0
Hans Herrmann	West Germany	1953–1955, 1957–1961	0	19	18	0	0	1	1	10
François Hesnault	France	1984–1985	0	21	19	0	0	0	0	0
Hans Heyer	West Germany	1977	0	1	1 (Note: Hans Heyer illegally started the race, despite the fact he did not qualify.)	0	0	0	0	0
Damon Hill^	United Kingdom	1992–1999	1; 1996	122	115	20	22	42	19	360
Graham Hill^	United Kingdom	1958–1975	2; 1962, 1968	179	176	13	14	36	10	270 (289)
Phil Hill^	United States	1958–1964, 1966	1; 1961	52	49	6	3	16	6	94 (98)
Ryo Hirakawa*	Japan	2026	0	1	1	0	0	0	0	1
Peter Hirt	Switzerland	1951–1953	0	5	4	0	0	0	0	0
David Hobbs	United Kingdom	1967–1968, 1971, 1974	0	7	7	0	0	0	0	0
Gary Hocking	Rhodesia and Nyasaland	1962	0	1	0	0	0	0	0	0
Ingo Hoffmann	Brazil	1976–1977	0	6	3	0	0	0	0	0
Bill Holland	United States	1950, 1953	0	3	2	0	0	1	0	6
Jackie Holmes	United States	1950, 1953	0	4	2	0	0	0	0	0
Bill Homeier	United States	1954–1955, 1960	0	6	3	0	0	0	0	1
Kazuyoshi Hoshino	Japan	1976–1977	0	2	2	0	0	0	0	0
Jerry Hoyt	United States	1950, 1953–1955	0	4	4	1	0	0	0	0
Nico Hülkenberg*	Germany	2010, 2012–2020, 2022–2026	0	274	269	1	0	1	2	636
Denny Hulme^	New Zealand	1965–1974	1; 1967	112	112	1	8	33	9	248
James Hunt^	United Kingdom	1973–1979	1; 1976	93	92	14	10	23	8	179
Jim Hurtubise	United States	1960	0	1	1	0	0	0	0	0
Gus Hutchison	United States	1970	0	1	1	0	0	0	0	0
Jacky Ickx	Belgium	1967–1979	0	120	116	13	8	25	14	181
Yuji Ide	Japan	2006	0	4	4	0	0	0	0	0
Jesús Iglesias	Argentina	1955	0	1	1	0	0	0	0	0
Taki Inoue	Japan	1994–1995	0	18	18	0	0	0	0	0
Innes Ireland	United Kingdom	1959–1966	0	53	50	0	1	4	1	47
Eddie Irvine	United Kingdom	1993–2002	0	148	145	0	4	26	1	191
Chris Irwin	United Kingdom	1966–1967	0	10	10	0	0	0	0	2
Jean-Pierre Jabouille	France	1974–1975, 1977–1981	0	55	49	6	2	2	0	21
Jimmy Jackson	United States	1950, 1954	0	3	2	0	0	0	0	0
Joe James	United States	1951–1952	0	3	2	0	0	0	0	0
John James	United Kingdom	1951	0	1	1	0	0	0	0	0
Jean-Pierre Jarier	France	1971, 1973–1983	0	143	135	3	0	3	3	31.5
Max Jean (Note: Jean's name was incorrectly recorded on an entry list as "Jean Max", and this error is often repeated in record books.)	France	1971	0	1	1	0	0	0	0	0
Stefan Johansson	Sweden	1980, 1983–1991	0	103	79	0	0	12	0	88
Eddie Johnson	United States	1952–1960	0	9	9	0	0	0	0	1
Leslie Johnson	United Kingdom	1950	0	1	1	0	0	0	0	0
Bruce Johnstone	South Africa	1962	0	1	1	0	0	0	0	0
Alan Jones^	Australia	1975–1981, 1983, 1985–1986	1; 1980	117	116	6	12	24	13	199 (206)
Tom Jones	United States	1967	0	1	0	0	0	0	0	0
Juan Jover	Spain	1951	0	1	0	0	0	0	0	0
Oswald Karch	West Germany	1953	0	1	1	0	0	0	0	0
Narain Karthikeyan	India	2005, 2011–2012	0	48	46	0	0	0	0	5
Ukyo Katayama	Japan	1992–1997	0	97	95	0	0	0	0	5
Ken Kavanagh	Australia	1958	0	2	0	0	0	0	0	0
Rupert Keegan	United Kingdom	1977–1978, 1980, 1982	0	37	25	0	0	0	0	0
Eddie Keizan	South Africa	1973–1975	0	3	3	0	0	0	0	0
Al Keller	United States	1955–1959	0	6	5	0	0	0	0	0
Joe Kelly	Ireland	1950–1951	0	2	2	0	0	0	0	0
David Kennedy	Ireland	1980	0	7	0	0	0	0	0	0
Loris Kessel	Switzerland	1976–1977	0	6	3	0	0	0	0	0
Bruce Kessler	United States	1958	0	1	0	0	0	0	0	0
Nicolas Kiesa	Denmark	2003	0	5	5	0	0	0	0	0
Leo Kinnunen	Finland	1974	0	6	1	0	0	0	0	0
Danny Kladis	United States	1954	0	5	1	0	0	0	0	0
Hans Klenk	West Germany	1952	0	1	1	0	0	0	0	0
Peter de Klerk	South Africa	1963, 1965, 1969–1970	0	4	4	0	0	0	0	0
Christian Klien	Austria	2004–2006, 2010	0	51	49	0	0	0	0	14
Karl Kling	West Germany	1954–1955	0	11	11	0	0	2	1	17
Ernst Klodwig	East Germany	1952–1953	0	2	2	0	0	0	0	0
Kamui Kobayashi	Japan	2009–2012, 2014	0	76	75	0	0	1	1	125
Helmut Koinigg	Austria	1974	0	3	2	0	0	0	0	0
Heikki Kovalainen	Finland	2007–2013	0	112	111	1	1	4	2	105
Mikko Kozarowitzky	Finland	1977	0	2	0	0	0	0	0	0
Willi Krakau	West Germany	1952	0	1	0	0	0	0	0	0
Rudolf Krause	East Germany	1952–1953	0	2	2	0	0	0	0	0
Robert Kubica	Poland	2006–2010, 2019, 2021	0	99	99	1	1	12	1	274
Kurt Kuhnke	West Germany	1963	0	1	0	0	0	0	0	0
Masami Kuwashima	Japan	1976	0	1	0	0	0	0	0	0
Daniil Kvyat	Russia	2014–2017, 2019–2020	0	112	110	0	0	3	1	202
Robert La Caze	Morocco	1958	0	1	1	0	0	0	0	0
Jacques Laffite	France	1974–1986	0	180	176	7	6	32	7	228
Franck Lagorce	France	1994	0	2	2	0	0	0	0	0
Jan Lammers	Netherlands	1979–1982, 1992	0	41	23	0	0	0	0	0
Pedro Lamy	Portugal	1993–1996	0	32	32	0	0	0	0	1
Chico Landi	Brazil	1951–1953, 1956	0	6	6	0	0	0	0	1.5
Hermann Lang	West Germany	1953–1954	0	2	2	0	0	0	0	2
Claudio Langes	Italy	1990	0	14	0	0	0	0	0	0
Nicola Larini	Italy	1987–1992, 1994, 1997	0	75	49	0	0	1	0	7
Oscar Larrauri	Argentina	1988–1989	0	21	8	0	0	0	0	0
Gérard Larrousse	France	1974	0	2	1	0	0	0	0	0
Jud Larson	United States	1958–1959	0	5	2	0	0	0	0	0
Nicholas Latifi	Canada	2020–2022	0	61	61	0	0	0	0	9
Niki Lauda^	Austria	1971–1979, 1982–1985	3; 1975, 1977, 1984	177	171	24	25	54	24	420.5
Roger Laurent	Belgium	1952	0	2	2	0	0	0	0	0
Giovanni Lavaggi	Italy	1995–1996	0	10	7	0	0	0	0	0
Chris Lawrence	United Kingdom	1966	0	2	2	0	0	0	0	0
Liam Lawson*	New Zealand	2023–2026	0	55	55	0	0	0	0	133
Charles Leclerc*	Monaco	2018–2026	0	193	191	27	9	56	15	1921
Michel Leclère	France	1975–1976	0	8	7	0	0	0	0	0
Neville Lederle	South Africa	1962, 1965	0	2	1	0	0	0	0	1
Geoff Lees	United Kingdom	1978–1980, 1982	0	12	5	0	0	0	0	0
Gijs van Lennep	Netherlands	1971, 1973–1975	0	10	8	0	0	0	0	2
Arthur Legat	Belgium	1952–1953	0	2	2	0	0	0	0	0
JJ Lehto	Finland	1989–1994	0	70	62	0	0	1	0	10
Lamberto Leoni	Italy	1977–1978	0	5	1	0	0	0	0	0
Les Leston	United Kingdom	1956–1957	0	3	2	0	0	0	0	0
Pierre Levegh	France	1950–1951	0	6	6	0	0	0	0	0
Bayliss Levrett	United States	1950	0	3	1	0	0	0	0	0
Jackie Lewis	United Kingdom	1961–1962	0	10	9	0	0	0	0	3
Stuart Lewis-Evans	United Kingdom	1957–1958	0	14	14	2	0	2	0	16
Guy Ligier	France	1966–1967	0	13	12	0	0	0	0	1
Arvid Lindblad*	United Kingdom	2026	0	20	19	0	0	0	0	38
Andy Linden	United States	1951–1957	0	8	7	0	0	0	0	5
Roberto Lippi	Italy	1961–1963	0	3	1	0	0	0	0	0
Vitantonio Liuzzi	Italy	2005–2007, 2009–2011	0	81	80	0	0	0	0	26
Dries van der Lof	Netherlands	1952	0	1	1	0	0	0	0	0
Lella Lombardi	Italy	1974–1976	0	17	12	0	0	0	0	0.5 (Note: Lombardi is the only female Formula One driver ever to score World Championship points.)
Ricardo Londoño	Colombia	1981	0	1	0	0	0	0	0	0
Ernst Loof	West Germany	1953	0	1	1	0	0	0	0	0
André Lotterer	Germany	2014	0	1	1	0	0	0	0	0
Henri Louveau	France	1950–1951	0	2	2	0	0	0	0	0
John Love	Rhodesia	1962–1965, 1967–1972	0	10	9	0	0	1	0	6
Pete Lovely	United States	1959–1960, 1969–1971	0	11	7	0	0	0	0	0
Roger Loyer	France	1954	0	1	1	0	0	0	0	0
Jean Lucas	France	1955	0	1	1	0	0	0	0	0
Jean Lucienbonnet	France	1959	0	1	0	0	0	0	0	0
Erik Lundgren	Sweden	1951	0	1	0	0	0	0	0	0
Brett Lunger	United States	1975–1978	0	43	34	0	0	0	0	0
Mike MacDowel	United Kingdom	1957	0	1	1	0	0	0	0	0
Herbert MacKay-Fraser	United States	1957	0	1	1	0	0	0	0	0
Bill Mackey	United States	1951	0	1	1	0	0	0	0	0
Lance Macklin	United Kingdom	1952–1955	0	15	13	0	0	0	0	0
Damien Magee	United Kingdom	1975–1976	0	2	1	0	0	0	0	0
Tony Maggs	South Africa	1961–1965	0	27	25	0	0	3	0	26
Mike Magill	United States	1957–1959	0	4	3	0	0	0	0	0
Umberto Maglioli	Italy	1953–1957	0	10	9	0	0	2 (Note: Maglioli shared podiums with José Froilán González (3rd, 1954 Italian Grand Prix) and Nino Farina/Maurice Trintignant (3rd, 1955 Argentine Grand Prix).)	0	3.33
Jan Magnussen	Denmark	1995, 1997–1998	0	25	24	0	0	0	0	1
Kevin Magnussen	Denmark	2014–2020, 2022–2024	0	187	185	1	0	1	3	202
Guy Mairesse	France	1950–1951	0	3	3	0	0	0	0	0
Willy Mairesse	Belgium	1960–1963, 1965	0	13	12	0	0	1	0	7
Pastor Maldonado	Venezuela	2011–2015	0	96	95	1	1	1	0	76
Nigel Mansell^	United Kingdom	1980–1992, 1994–1995	1; 1992	191	187	32	31	59	30	480 (482)
Sergio Mantovani	Italy	1953–1955	0	8	7	0	0	0	0	4
Johnny Mantz	United States	1953	0	1	0	0	0	0	0	0
Robert Manzon	France	1950–1956	0	29	28	0	0	2	0	16
Onofre Marimón	Argentina	1951, 1953–1954	0	12	11	0	0	2	1	8.14
Helmut Marko	Austria	1971–1972	0	10	9	0	0	0	0	0
Tarso Marques	Brazil	1996–1997, 2001	0	26	24	0	0	0	0	0
Leslie Marr	United Kingdom	1954–1955	0	2	2	0	0	0	0	0
Tony Marsh	United Kingdom	1957–1958, 1961	0	5	4	0	0	0	0	0
Eugène Martin	France	1950	0	2	2	0	0	0	0	0
Pierluigi Martini	Italy	1984–1985, 1988–1995	0	124	118	0	0	0	0	18
Jochen Mass	West Germany	1973–1980, 1982	0	114	105	0	1	8	2	71
Felipe Massa	Brazil	2002, 2004–2017	0	272	269	16	11	41	15	1167
Cristiano da Matta	Brazil	2003–2004	0	28	28	0	0	0	0	13
Michael May	Switzerland	1961	0	3	2	0	0	0	0	0
Timmy Mayer	United States	1962	0	1	1	0	0	0	0	0
Nikita Mazepin	RAF (Note: Nikita Mazepin is Russian, but he competed as a neutral competitor as the Court of Arbitration for Sport upheld a ban on Russia competing at World Championships. The ban was implemented by the World Anti-Doping Agency in response to state-sponsored doping program of Russian athletes.)	2021	0	22	21	0	0	0	0	0
François Mazet	France	1971	0	1	1	0	0	0	0	0
Gastón Mazzacane	Argentina	2000–2001	0	21	21	0	0	0	0	0
Kenneth McAlpine	United Kingdom	1952–1953, 1955	0	7	7	0	0	0	0	0
Perry McCarthy	United Kingdom	1992	0	11	0	0	0	0	0	0
Ernie McCoy	United States	1953–1954	0	3	2	0	0	0	0	0
Johnny McDowell	United States	1950–1952	0	3	3	0	0	0	0	0
Jack McGrath	United States	1950–1955	0	6	6	1	0	2 (Note: McGrath shared a podium with Manny Ayulo (3rd, 1951 Indianapolis 500).)	1	9
Brian McGuire	Australia	1977	0	2	0	0	0	0	0	0
Bruce McLaren	New Zealand	1958–1970	0	104	100	0	4	27	3	188.5 (196.5)
Allan McNish	United Kingdom	2002	0	17	16	0	0	0	0	0
Graham McRae	New Zealand	1973	0	1	1	0	0	0	0	0
Jim McWithey	United States	1959–1960	0	5	2	0	0	0	0	0
Carlos Menditeguy	Argentina	1953–1958, 1960	0	11	10	0	0	1	0	9
Roberto Merhi	Spain	2015	0	14	13	0	0	0	0	0
Harry Merkel	West Germany	1952	0	1	0	0	0	0	0	0
Arturo Merzario	Italy	1972–1979	0	85	57	0	0	0	0	11
Roberto Mieres	Argentina	1953–1955	0	17	17	0	0	0	1	13
François Migault	France	1972, 1974–1975	0	16	13	0	0	0	0	0
John Miles	United Kingdom	1969–1970	0	15	12	0	0	0	0	2
André Milhoux	Belgium	1956	0	1	1	0	0	0	0	0
Chet Miller	United States	1951–1952	0	4	2	0	0	0	0	0
Gerhard Mitter	West Germany	1963–1965	0	7	5	0	0	0	0	3
Stefano Modena	Italy	1987–1992	0	81	70	0	0	2	0	17
Thomas Monarch	United States	1963	0	1	0	0	0	0	0	0
Franck Montagny	France	2006	0	7	7	0	0	0	0	0
Tiago Monteiro	Portugal	2005–2006	0	37	37	0	0	1	0	7
Andrea Montermini	Italy	1994–1996	0	29	19	0	0	0	0	0
Peter Monteverdi	Switzerland	1961	0	1	0	0	0	0	0	0
Robin Montgomerie-Charrington	United Kingdom	1952	0	1	1	0	0	0	0	0
Juan Pablo Montoya	Colombia	2001–2006	0	95	94	13	7	30	12	307
Gianni Morbidelli	Italy	1990–1992, 1994–1995, 1997	0	70	67	0	0	1	0	8.5
Roberto Moreno	Brazil	1982, 1987, 1989–1992, 1995	0	77	41	0	0	1	1	15
Dave Morgan	United Kingdom	1975	0	1	1	0	0	0	0	0
Silvio Moser	Switzerland	1967–1971	0	20	12	0	0	0	0	3
Bill Moss	United Kingdom	1959	0	1	0	0	0	0	0	0
Stirling Moss	United Kingdom	1951–1961	0	67	66	16	16 (Note: Moss shared a win with Tony Brooks (1957 British Grand Prix).)	24 (Note: Moss shared podiums with Cesare Perdisa (3rd, 1956 Belgian Grand Prix) and Maurice Trintignant (3rd, 1960 Argentine Grand Prix).)	19	185.64 (186.64)
Gino Munaron	Italy	1960	0	4	4	0	0	0	0	0
David Murray	United Kingdom	1950–1952	0	5	4	0	0	0	0	0
Luigi Musso	Italy	1953–1958	0	25	24	0	1 (Note: Musso shared a win with Juan Manuel Fangio (1956 Argentine Grand Prix).)	7	1	44
Kazuki Nakajima	Japan	2007–2009	0	36	36	0	0	0	0	9
Satoru Nakajima	Japan	1987–1991	0	80	74	0	0	0	1	16
Shinji Nakano	Japan	1997–1998	0	33	33	0	0	0	0	2
Duke Nalon	United States	1951–1953	0	5	3	1	0	0	0	0
Alessandro Nannini	Italy	1986–1990	0	78	76	0	1	9	2	65
Emanuele Naspetti	Italy	1992–1993	0	6	6	0	0	0	0	0
Felipe Nasr	Brazil	2015–2016	0	40	39	0	0	0	0	29
Massimo Natili	Italy	1961	0	2	1	0	0	0	0	0
Brian Naylor	United Kingdom	1957–1961	0	8	7	0	0	0	0	0
Mike Nazaruk	United States	1951, 1953–1954	0	4	3	0	0	1	0	8
Tiff Needell	United Kingdom	1980	0	2	1	0	0	0	0	0
Jac Nellemann	Denmark	1976	0	1	0	0	0	0	0	0
Patrick Nève	Belgium	1976–1978	0	14	10	0	0	0	0	0
John Nicholson	New Zealand	1974–1975	0	2	1	0	0	0	0	0
Cal Niday	United States	1953–1955	0	3	3	0	0	0	0	0
Helmut Niedermayr	West Germany	1952	0	1	1	0	0	0	0	0
Brausch Niemann	South Africa	1963, 1965	0	2	1	0	0	0	0	0
Gunnar Nilsson	Sweden	1976–1977	0	32	31	0	1	4	1	31
Hideki Noda	Japan	1994	0	3	3	0	0	0	0	0
Lando Norris~	United Kingdom	2019–2026	1; 2025	172	171	20	14	50	20	1676
Rodney Nuckey	United Kingdom	1953	0	2	1	0	0	0	0	0
Robert O'Brien	United States	1952	0	1	1	0	0	0	0	0
Esteban Ocon*	France	2016–2018, 2020–2026	0	199	198	0	1	4	1	490
Pat O'Connor	United States	1954–1958	0	6	5	1	0	0	0	0
Casimiro de Oliveira	Portugal	1958	0	1	0	0	0	0	0	0
Jackie Oliver	United Kingdom	1968–1973, 1977	0	52	50	0	0	2	1	13
Danny Ongais	United States	1977–1978	0	6	4	0	0	0	0	0
Rikky von Opel	Liechtenstein	1973–1974	0	14	10	0	0	0	0	0
Karl Oppitzhauser	Austria	1976	0	1 (Note: Oppitzhauser entered the 1976 Austrian Grand Prix, but was refused the necessary clearances to start practice as he did not have enough racing experience.)	0	0	0	0	0	0
Fritz d'Orey	Brazil	1959	0	3	3	0	0	0	0	0
Arthur Owen	United Kingdom	1960	0	1	1	0	0	0	0	0
Carlos Pace	Brazil	1972–1977	0	73	72	1	1	6	5	58
Nello Pagani	Italy	1950	0	1	1	0	0	0	0	0
Riccardo Paletti	Italy	1982	0	8	2	0	0	0	0	0
Torsten Palm	Sweden	1975	0	2	1	0	0	0	0	0
Jolyon Palmer	United Kingdom	2016–2017	0	37	35	0	0	0	0	9
Jonathan Palmer	United Kingdom	1983–1989	0	88	83	0	0	0	1	14
Olivier Panis	France	1994–1999, 2001–2004	0	158	157	0	1	5	0	76
Giorgio Pantano	Italy	2004	0	15	14	0	0	0	0	0
Massimiliano Papis	Italy	1995	0	7	7	0	0	0	0	0
Mike Parkes	United Kingdom	1959, 1966–1967	0	7	6	1	0	2	0	14
Reg Parnell	United Kingdom	1950–1952, 1954	0	7	6	0	0	1	0	9
Tim Parnell	United Kingdom	1959, 1961, 1963	0	4	2	0	0	0	0	0
Johnnie Parsons	United States	1950–1958	0	9	9	0	1	1	1	12
Riccardo Patrese	Italy	1977–1993	0	257	256	8	6	37	13	281
Al Pease	Canada	1967–1969	0	3	2	0	0	0	0	0
Roger Penske	United States	1961–1962	0	2	2	0	0	0	0	0
Cesare Perdisa	Italy	1955–1957	0	8	7	0	0	2 (Note: Perdisa shared podiums with Jean Behra (3rd, 1955 Monaco Grand Prix) and Stirling Moss (3rd, 1956 Belgian Grand Prix).)	0	5
Sergio Pérez*	Mexico	2011–2024, 2026	0	305	301	3	6	39	12	1638
Luis Pérez-Sala	Spain	1988–1989	0	32	26	0	0	0	0	1
Larry Perkins	Australia	1974, 1976–1977	0	15	11	0	0	0	0	0
Xavier Perrot	Switzerland	1969	0	1	1	0	0	0	0	0
Henri Pescarolo	France	1968, 1970–1974, 1976	0	64	57	0	0	1	1	12
Alessandro Pesenti-Rossi	Italy	1976	0	4	3	0	0	0	0	0
Josef Peters	West Germany	1952	0	1	1	0	0	0	0	0
Ronnie Peterson	Sweden	1970–1978	0	123	123	14	10	26	9	206
Vitaly Petrov	Russia	2010–2012	0	58	57	0	0	1	1	64
Alfredo Pián	Argentina	1950	0	1	0	0	0	0	0	0
Oscar Piastri*	Australia	2023–2026	0	90	88	6	9	28	9	951
Charles Pic	France	2012–2013	0	39	39	0	0	0	0	0
François Picard	France	1958	0	1	1	0	0	0	0	0
Ernie Pieterse	South Africa	1962–1963, 1965	0	3	2	0	0	0	0	0
Paul Pietsch	West Germany	1950–1952	0	3	3	0	0	0	0	0
André Pilette	Belgium	1951, 1953–1954, 1956, 1961, 1963–1964	0	14	8	0	0	0	0	2
Teddy Pilette	Belgium	1974, 1977	0	4	1	0	0	0	0	0
Luigi Piotti	Italy	1955–1958	0	8	5	0	0	0	0	0
David Piper	United Kingdom	1959–1960	0	3	2	0	0	0	0	0
Nelson Piquet^	Brazil	1978–1991	3; 1981, 1983, 1987	207	204	24	23	60	23	481.5 (485.5)
Nelson Piquet Jr.	Brazil	2008–2009	0	28	28	0	0	1	0	19
Renato Pirocchi	Italy	1961	0	1	1	0	0	0	0	0
Didier Pironi	France	1978–1982	0	72	70	4	3	13	5	101
Emanuele Pirro	Italy	1989–1991	0	40	37	0	0	0	0	3
Antônio Pizzonia	Brazil	2003–2005	0	20	20	0	0	0	0	8
Eric van de Poele	Belgium	1991–1992	0	29	5	0	0	0	0	0
Jacques Pollet	France	1954–1955	0	5	5	0	0	0	0	0
Ben Pon	Netherlands	1962	0	1	1	0	0	0	0	0
Dennis Poore	United Kingdom	1952	0	2	2	0	0	0	0	3
Alfonso de Portago	Spain	1956–1957	0	5	5	0	0	1	0	4
Sam Posey	United States	1971–1972	0	2	2	0	0	0	0	0
Charles Pozzi	France	1950	0	1	1	0	0	0	0	0
Jackie Pretorius	South Africa	1965, 1968, 1971, 1973	0	4	3	0	0	0	0	0
Ernesto Prinoth	Italy	1962	0	1	0	0	0	0	0	0
David Prophet	United Kingdom	1963, 1965	0	2	2	0	0	0	0	0
Alain Prost^	France	1980–1991, 1993	4; 1985–1986, 1989, 1993	202	199	33	51	106	41	768.5 (798.5)
Tom Pryce	United Kingdom	1974–1977	0	42	42	1	0	2	0	19
David Purley	United Kingdom	1973–1974, 1977	0	11	7	0	0	0	0	0
Clive Puzey	Rhodesia	1965	0	1	0	0	0	0	0	0
Dieter Quester	Austria	1969, 1974	0	2	1	0	0	0	0	0
Ian Raby	United Kingdom	1963–1965	0	7	3	0	0	0	0	0
Bobby Rahal	United States	1978	0	2	2	0	0	0	0	0
Kimi Räikkönen^	Finland	2001–2009, 2012–2021	1; 2007	353	349	18	21	103	46	1873
Hermano da Silva Ramos	Brazil	1955–1956	0	7	7	0	0	0	0	2
Pierre-Henri Raphanel	France	1988–1989	0	17	1	0	0	0	0	0
Dick Rathmann	United States	1950, 1956, 1958–1960	0	6	5	1	0	0	0	2
Jim Rathmann	United States	1950, 1952–1960	0	10	10	0	1	4	2	29
Roland Ratzenberger	Austria	1994	0	3	1	0	0	0	0	0
Brian Raubenheimer	South Africa	1965	0	1	0	0	0	0	0	0
Héctor Rebaque	Mexico	1977–1981	0	58	41	0	0	0	0	13
Brian Redman	United Kingdom	1968, 1970–1974	0	15	12	0	0	1	0	8
Jimmy Reece	United States	1952, 1954–1958	0	6	6	0	0	0	0	0
Ray Reed	Rhodesia	1965	0	1	0	0	0	0	0	0
Alan Rees	United Kingdom	1967	0	3	3	0	0	0	0	0
Clay Regazzoni	Switzerland	1970–1980	0	139	132	5	5	28	15	209 (212)
Paul di Resta	United Kingdom	2011–2013, 2017	0	59	59	0	0	0	0	121
Carlos Reutemann	Argentina	1972–1982	0	146	146	6	12	45	6	298 (310)
Lance Reventlow	United States	1960	0	4	1	0	0	0	0	0
Peter Revson	United States	1964, 1971–1974	0	32	30	1	2	8	0	61
John Rhodes	United Kingdom	1965	0	1	1	0	0	0	0	0
Alex Ribeiro	Brazil	1976–1977, 1979	0	20	10	0	0	0	0	0
Daniel Ricciardo	Australia	2011–2024	0	258	257	3	8	32	17	1329
Ken Richardson	United Kingdom	1951	0	1 (Note: Richardson qualified 10th for the 1951 Italian Grand Prix, but was not allowed to enter the race as he did not have the correct licence.)	0	0	0	0	0	0
Fritz Riess	West Germany	1952	0	1	1	0	0	0	0	0
Jim Rigsby	United States	1952	0	2	1	0	0	0	0	0
Jochen Rindt^	Austria	1964–1970	1; 1970	62	60	10	6	13	3	107 (109)
John Riseley-Prichard	United Kingdom	1954	0	1	1	0	0	0	0	0
Giovanni de Riu	Italy	1954	0	1	0	0	0	0	0	0
Richard Robarts	United Kingdom	1974	0	4	3	0	0	0	0	0
Pedro Rodríguez	Mexico	1963–1971	0	56	55	0	2	7	1	71
Ricardo Rodríguez	Mexico	1961–1962	0	6	5	0	0	0	0	4
Alberto Rodríguez Larreta	Argentina	1960	0	1	1	0	0	0	0	0
Franco Rol	Italy	1950–1952	0	5	5	0	0	0	0	0
Alan Rollinson	United Kingdom	1965	0	1	0	0	0	0	0	0
Tony Rolt	United Kingdom	1950, 1953, 1955	0	3	2	0	0	0	0	0
Bertil Roos	Sweden	1974	0	1	1	0	0	0	0	0
Pedro de la Rosa	Spain	1999–2002, 2005–2006, 2010–2012	0	107	104	0	0	1	1	35
Keke Rosberg^	Finland	1978–1986	1; 1982	128	114	5	5	17	3	159.5
Nico Rosberg^	Germany	2006–2016	1; 2016	206	206	30	23	57	20	1594.5
Mauri Rose	United States	1950–1951	0	2	2	0	0	1	0	4
Louis Rosier	France	1950–1956	0	38	38	0	0	2	0	18
Ricardo Rosset	Brazil	1996–1998	0	33	26	0	0	0	0	0
Alexander Rossi	United States	2015	0	7	5	0	0	0	0	0
Huub Rothengatter	Netherlands	1984–1986	0	30	25	0	0	0	0	0
Basil van Rooyen	South Africa	1968–1969	0	2	2	0	0	0	0	0
Lloyd Ruby	United States	1960–1961	0	2	2	0	0	0	0	0
Jean-Claude Rudaz	Switzerland	1964	0	1	0	0	0	0	0	0
George Russell*	United Kingdom	2019–2026	0	172	172	12	8	32	13	1295
Eddie Russo	United States	1955–1957, 1960	0	7	4	0	0	0	0	0
Paul Russo	United States	1950–1960	0	11	8	0	0	1 (Note: Russo shared a podium with Tony Bettenhausen (2nd, 1955 Indianapolis 500).)	1	8.5
Troy Ruttman	United States	1950–1958, 1960	0	12	8	0	1	1	0	9.5
Peter Ryan	Canada	1961	0	1	1	0	0	0	0	0
Eddie Sachs	United States	1957–1960	0	7	4	1	0	0	0	0
Bob Said	United States	1959	0	1	1	0	0	0	0	0
Carlos Sainz Jr.*	Spain	2015–2026	0	253	249	6	4	29	4	1343.5
Eliseo Salazar	Chile	1981–1983	0	37	24	0	0	0	0	3
Mika Salo	Finland	1994–2000, 2002	0	111	109	0	0	2	0	33
Roy Salvadori	United Kingdom	1952–1962	0	50	47	0	0	2	0	19
Consalvo Sanesi	Italy	1950–1951	0	5	5	0	0	0	0	3
Stéphane Sarrazin	France	1999	0	1	1	0	0	0	0	0
Logan Sargeant	United States	2023–2024	0	37	36	0	0	0	0	1
Takuma Sato	Japan	2002–2008	0	92	90	0	0	1	0	44
Carl Scarborough	United States	1951, 1953	0	2	2	0	0	0	0	0
Ludovico Scarfiotti	Italy	1963–1968	0	12	10	0	1	1	1	17
Giorgio Scarlatti	Italy	1956–1961	0	15	12	0	0	0	0	1
Ian Scheckter	South Africa	1974–1977	0	20	18	0	0	0	0	0
Jody Scheckter^	South Africa	1972–1980	1; 1979	113	112	3	10	33	5	246 (255)
Harry Schell	United States	1950–1960	0	57	55	0	0	2	0	32
Tim Schenken	Australia	1970–1974	0	36	34	0	0	1	0	7
Albert Scherrer	Switzerland	1953	0	1	1	0	0	0	0	0
Domenico Schiattarella	Italy	1994–1995	0	7	6	0	0	0	0	0
Heinz Schiller	Switzerland	1962	0	1	1	0	0	0	0	0
Bill Schindler	United States	1950–1952	0	3	3	0	0	0	0	0
Jean-Louis Schlesser	France	1983, 1988	0	2	1	0	0	0	0	0
Jo Schlesser	France	1968	0	3	3	0	0	0	0	0
Bernd Schneider	West Germany	1988–1990	0	34	9	0	0	0	0	0
Rudolf Schoeller	Switzerland	1952	0	1	1	0	0	0	0	0
Rob Schroeder	United States	1962	0	1	1	0	0	0	0	0
Michael Schumacher^	Germany	1991–2006, 2010–2012	7; 1994–1995, 2000–2004	308	306	68	91	155	77	1566 (Note: Schumacher was disqualified from the 1997 World Championship with 78 points, these points are included in the total.)
Mick Schumacher	Germany	2021–2022	0	44	43	0	0	0	0	12
Ralf Schumacher	Germany	1997–2007	0	181	180	6	6	27	8	329
Vern Schuppan	Australia	1972, 1974–1975, 1977	0	13	9	0	0	0	0	0
Adolfo Schwelm Cruz	Argentina	1953	0	1	1	0	0	0	0	0
Bob Scott	United States	1952–1954	0	3	3	0	0	0	0	0
Archie Scott Brown	United Kingdom	1956	0	1	1	0	0	0	0	0
Piero Scotti	Italy	1956	0	1	1	0	0	0	0	0
Wolfgang Seidel	West Germany	1953, 1958, 1960–1962	0	12	10	0	0	0	0	0
Günther Seiffert	West Germany	1962	0	1	0	0	0	0	0	0
Ayrton Senna^	Brazil	1984–1994	3; 1988, 1990–1991	162	161	65	41	80	19	610 (614)
Bruno Senna	Brazil	2010–2012	0	46	46	0	0	0	1	33
Dorino Serafini	Italy	1950	0	1	1	0	0	1 (Note: Serafini shared a podium with Alberto Ascari (2nd, 1950 Italian Grand Prix).)	0	3
Chico Serra	Brazil	1981–1983	0	33	18	0	0	0	0	1
Doug Serrurier	South Africa	1962–1963, 1965	0	3	2	0	0	0	0	0
Johnny Servoz-Gavin	France	1967–1970	0	13	12	0	0	1	0	9
Tony Settember	United States	1962–1963	0	7	6	0	0	0	0	0
Hap Sharp	United States	1961–1964	0	6	6	0	0	0	0	0
Brian Shawe-Taylor	United Kingdom	1950–1951	0	3	1	0	0	0	0	0
Carroll Shelby	United States	1958–1959	0	8	8	0	0	0	0	0
Tony Shelly	New Zealand	1962	0	3	1	0	0	0	0	0
Jo Siffert	Switzerland	1962–1971	0	100	96	2	2	6	4	68
André Simon	France	1951–1952, 1955–1957	0	12	11	0	0	0	0	0
Sergey Sirotkin	Russia	2018	0	21	21	0	0	0	0	1
Rob Slotemaker	Netherlands	1962	0	1	0	0	0	0	0	0
Moisés Solana	Mexico	1963–1968	0	8	8	0	0	0	0	0
Alex Soler-Roig	Spain	1970–1972	0	10	6	0	0	0	0	0
Raymond Sommer	France	1950	0	5	5	0	0	0	0	3
Vincenzo Sospiri	Italy	1997	0	1	0	0	0	0	0	0
Stephen South	United Kingdom	1980	0	1	0	0	0	0	0	0
Mike Sparken	France	1955	0	1	1	0	0	0	0	0
Scott Speed	United States	2006–2007	0	28	28	0	0	0	0	0
Mike Spence	United Kingdom	1963–1968	0	37	36	0	0	1	0	27
Alan Stacey	United Kingdom	1958–1960	0	7	7	0	0	0	0	0
Gaetano Starrabba	Italy	1961	0	1	1	0	0	0	0	0
Will Stevens	United Kingdom	2014–2015	0	20	18	0	0	0	0	0
Chuck Stevenson	United States	1951–1954, 1960	0	5	5	0	0	0	0	0
Ian Stewart	United Kingdom	1953	0	1	1	0	0	0	0	0
Jackie Stewart^	United Kingdom	1965–1973	3; 1969, 1971, 1973	100	99	17	27	43	15	359 (360)
Jimmy Stewart	United Kingdom	1953	0	1	1	0	0	0	0	0
Siegfried Stohr	Italy	1981	0	13	9	0	0	0	0	0
Rolf Stommelen	West Germany	1970–1976, 1978	0	63	54	0	0	1	0	14
Philippe Streiff	France	1984–1988	0	55	54	0	0	1	0	11
Lance Stroll*	Canada	2017–2026	0	213	209	1	0	3	0	325
Hans Stuck	West Germany	1951–1953	0	5	3	0	0	0	0	0
Hans-Joachim Stuck	West Germany	1974–1979	0	81	74	0	0	2	0	29
Otto Stuppacher	Austria	1976	0	3	0	0	0	0	0	0
Danny Sullivan	United States	1983	0	15	15	0	0	0	0	2
Marc Surer	Switzerland	1979–1986	0	88	82	0	0	0	1	17
John Surtees^	United Kingdom	1960–1972	1; 1964	113	111	8	6	24	10	180
Andy Sutcliffe	United Kingdom	1977	0	1	0	0	0	0	0	0
Adrian Sutil	Germany	2007–2011, 2013–2014	0	128	128	0	0	0	1	124
Len Sutton	United States	1958–1960	0	4	3	0	0	0	0	0
Aguri Suzuki	Japan	1988–1995	0	88	65	0	0	1	0	8
Toshio Suzuki	Japan	1993	0	2	2	0	0	0	0	0
Jacques Swaters	Belgium	1951, 1953–1954	0	8	7	0	0	0	0	0
Bob Sweikert	United States	1952–1956	0	7	5	0	1	1	0	8
Toranosuke Takagi	Japan	1998–1999	0	32	32	0	0	0	0	0
Noritake Takahara	Japan	1976–1977	0	2	2	0	0	0	0	0
Kunimitsu Takahashi	Japan	1977	0	1	1	0	0	0	0	0
Patrick Tambay	France	1977–1979, 1981–1986	0	123	114	5	2	11	2	103
Luigi Taramazzo	Italy	1958	0	1	0	0	0	0	0	0
Gabriele Tarquini	Italy	1987–1992, 1995	0	79	38	0	0	0	0	1
Piero Taruffi	Italy	1950–1952, 1954–1956	0	19	18	0	1	5	1	41
Dennis Taylor	United Kingdom	1959	0	1	0	0	0	0	0	0
Henry Taylor	United Kingdom	1959–1961	0	11	8	0	0	0	0	3
John Taylor	United Kingdom	1964, 1966	0	5	5	0	0	0	0	1
Mike Taylor	United Kingdom	1959–1960	0	2	1	0	0	0	0	0
Trevor Taylor	United Kingdom	1959, 1961–1964, 1966	0	29	27	0	0	1	0	8
Marshall Teague	United States	1953–1954, 1957	0	5	3	0	0	0	0	0
Shorty Templeman	United States	1955, 1958, 1960	0	5	3	0	0	0	0	0
Max de Terra	Switzerland	1952–1953	0	2	2	0	0	0	0	0
André Testut	Monaco	1958–1959	0	2	0	0	0	0	0	0
Mike Thackwell	New Zealand	1980, 1984	0	5	2	0	0	0	0	0
Alfonso Thiele	United States	1960	0	1	1	0	0	0	0	0
Eric Thompson	United Kingdom	1952	0	1	1	0	0	0	0	2
Johnny Thomson	United States	1953–1960	0	8	8	1	0	1	1	10
Leslie Thorne	United Kingdom	1954	0	1	1	0	0	0	0	0
Bud Tingelstad	United States	1960	0	1	1	0	0	0	0	0
Sam Tingle	Rhodesia	1963, 1965, 1967–1969	0	5	5	0	0	0	0	0
Desmond Titterington	United Kingdom	1956	0	1	1	0	0	0	0	0
Johnnie Tolan	United States	1956–1958	0	7	3	0	0	0	0	0
Alejandro de Tomaso	Argentina	1957, 1959	0	2	2	0	0	0	0	0
Charles de Tornaco	Belgium	1952–1953	0	4	2	0	0	0	0	0
Tony Trimmer	United Kingdom	1975–1978	0	6	0	0	0	0	0	0
Maurice Trintignant	France	1950–1964	0	84	81	0	2	10 (Note: Trintignant shared podiums with José Froilán González/Nino Farina (2nd, 1955 Argentine Grand Prix), Nino Farina/Umberto Maglioli (3rd, 1955 Argentine Grand Prix) and Stirling Moss (3rd, 1960 Argentine Grand Prix).)	1	72.33
Wolfgang von Trips	West Germany	1956–1961	0	29	27	1	2	6	0	56
Jarno Trulli	Italy	1997–2011	0	256	252	4	1	11	1	246.5
Yuki Tsunoda*	Japan	2021–2026	0	117	114	0	0	0	1	125
Esteban Tuero	Argentina	1998	0	16	16	0	0	0	0	0
Guy Tunmer	South Africa	1975	0	1	1	0	0	0	0	0
Jack Turner	United States	1956–1959	0	5	4	0	0	0	0	0
Toni Ulmen	West Germany	1952	0	2	2	0	0	0	0	0
Bobby Unser	United States	1968	0	2	1	0	0	0	0	0
Jerry Unser Jr.	United States	1958	0	1	1	0	0	0	0	0
Alberto Uría	Uruguay	1955–1956	0	2	2	0	0	0	0	0
Nino Vaccarella	Italy	1961–1962, 1965	0	5	4	0	0	0	0	0
Stoffel Vandoorne	Belgium	2016–2018	0	42	41	0	0	0	0	26
Bob Veith	United States	1956–1960	0	5	5	0	0	0	0	0
Jean-Éric Vergne	France	2012–2014	0	58	58	0	0	0	0	51
Jos Verstappen	Netherlands	1994–1998, 2000–2001, 2003	0	107	106	0	0	2	0	17
Max Verstappen~	Netherlands	2015–2026	4; 2021–2024	253	253	50	74	139	38	3723.5
Sebastian Vettel^	Germany	2007–2022	4; 2010–2013	300	299	57	53	122	38	3098
Gilles Villeneuve	Canada	1977–1982	0	68	67	2	6	13	8	101 (107)
Jacques Villeneuve^	Canada	1996–2006	1; 1997	165	163	13	11	23	9	235
Jacques Villeneuve Sr.	Canada	1981, 1983	0	3	0	0	0	0	0	0
Luigi Villoresi	Italy	1950–1956	0	34	31	0	0	8	1	46 (49)
Emilio de Villota	Spain	1976–1978, 1981–1982	0	15	2	0	0	0	0	0
Ottorino Volonterio	Switzerland	1954, 1956–1957	0	3	1	0	0	0	0	0
Jo Vonlanthen	Switzerland	1975	0	1	1	0	0	0	0	0
Ernie de Vos	Canada	1963	0	1	0	0	0	0	0	0
Nyck de Vries	Netherlands	2022–2023	0	11	11	0	0	0	0	2
Bill Vukovich	United States	1951–1955	0	6	5	1	2	2	3	19
Syd van der Vyver	South Africa	1962	0	1	0	0	0	0	0	0
Fred Wacker	United States	1953–1954	0	5	3	0	0	0	0	0
David Walker	Australia	1971–1972	0	11	11	0	0	0	0	0
Peter Walker	United Kingdom	1950–1951, 1955	0	4	3	0	0	0	0	0
Lee Wallard	United States	1950–1951	0	3	2	0	1	1	1	9
Heini Walter	Switzerland	1962	0	1	1	0	0	0	0	0
Rodger Ward	United States	1951–1960, 1963	0	12	12	0	1	2	0	14
Derek Warwick	United Kingdom	1981–1990, 1993	0	162	147	0	0	4	2	71
John Watson	United Kingdom	1973–1983, 1985	0	154	152	2	5	20	5	169
Spider Webb	United States	1950, 1952–1954	0	5	4	0	0	0	0	0
Mark Webber	Australia	2002–2013	0	217	215	13	9	42	19	1047.5
Pascal Wehrlein	Germany	2016–2017	0	40	39	0	0	0	0	6
Volker Weidler	West Germany	1989	0	10	0	0	0	0	0	0
Wayne Weiler	United States	1960	0	1	1	0	0	0	0	0
Karl Wendlinger	Austria	1991–1995	0	42	41	0	0	0	0	14
Peter Westbury	United Kingdom	1970	0	2	1	0	0	0	0	0
Chuck Weyant	United States	1955, 1957–1959	0	6	4	0	0	0	0	0
Ken Wharton	United Kingdom	1952–1955	0	16	15	0	0	0	0	3
Ted Whiteaway	United Kingdom	1955	0	1	0	0	0	0	0	0
Graham Whitehead	United Kingdom	1952	0	1	1	0	0	0	0	0
Peter Whitehead	United Kingdom	1950–1954	0	12	10	0	0	1	0	4
Bill Whitehouse	United Kingdom	1954	0	1	1	0	0	0	0	0
Robin Widdows	United Kingdom	1968	0	1	1	0	0	0	0	0
Eppie Wietzes	Canada	1967, 1974	0	2	2	0	0	0	0	0
Mike Wilds	United Kingdom	1974–1976	0	8	3	0	0	0	0	0
Jonathan Williams	United Kingdom	1967	0	1	1	0	0	0	0	0
Roger Williamson	United Kingdom	1973	0	2	2	0	0	0	0	0
Dempsey Wilson	United States	1958, 1960	0	5	2	0	0	0	0	0
Desiré Wilson	South Africa	1980	0	1	0	0	0	0	0	0
Justin Wilson	United Kingdom	2003	0	16	16	0	0	0	0	1
Vic Wilson	United Kingdom	1960, 1966	0	2	1	0	0	0	0	0
Joachim Winkelhock	West Germany	1989	0	7	0	0	0	0	0	0
Manfred Winkelhock	West Germany	1980, 1982–1985	0	56	47	0	0	0	0	2
Markus Winkelhock	Germany	2007	0	1	1	0	0	0	0	0
Reine Wisell	Sweden	1970–1974	0	23	22	0	0	1	0	13
Roelof Wunderink	Netherlands	1975	0	6	3	0	0	0	0	0
Alexander Wurz	Austria	1997–2000, 2005, 2007	0	69	69	0	0	3	1	45
Sakon Yamamoto	Japan	2006–2007, 2010	0	21	21	0	0	0	0	0
Alex Yoong	Malaysia	2001–2002	0	18	14	0	0	0	0	0
Alessandro Zanardi	Italy	1991–1994, 1999	0	44	41	0	0	0	0	1
Emilio Zapico	Spain	1976	0	1	0	0	0	0	0	0
Zhou Guanyu	China	2022–2024	0	68	68	0	0	0	2	16
Ricardo Zonta	Brazil	1999–2001, 2004–2005	0	37	36	0	0	0	0	3
Renzo Zorzi	Italy	1975–1977	0	7	7	0	0	0	0	1
Ricardo Zunino	Argentina	1979–1981	0	11	10	0	0	0	0	0
Driver name	Nationality	Seasons competed	Drivers' Championships	Race entries	Race starts	Pole positions	Race wins	Podiums	Fastest laps	Points

== By country ==
Drivers from 41 countries have entered a World Championship race. The United Kingdom is the most heavily represented with 164 drivers. (Note: Three of these drivers participated in World Championship events, but as Formula Two entries only: Tom Bridger, Dick Gibson, and Brian Hart (some sources omit these drivers as a result). They were ineligible for points (see list of points scoring systems for more information).) Second is the United States with 160; between 1950 and 1960 the American Indianapolis 500 race, then rarely contested by drivers from outside the United States, was part of the World Championship (but it was not sanctioned by the FIA and was instead sanctioned by either AAA in 1950–1955 or USAC in 1956–1960). A total of 58 American drivers have started World Championship races sanctioned by the FIA. Third is Italy with 100. Nine of these countries were represented in the very first race, the 1950 British Grand Prix, and the most recent newly represented country is China, with Zhou Guanyu making his debut at the 2022 Bahrain Grand Prix. Statistics are accurate as of the 2026 São Paulo Grand Prix.

Country	Total drivers	Champions	Championships	Race wins	First driver(s)	Most recent driver(s)/ Current driver(s)
Argentina	26	1 (Fangio [5])	5 (1951, 1954, 1955, 1956, 1957)	38 (Fangio [24], González [2], Reutemann [12])	Juan Manuel Fangio (1950 British Grand Prix)	Franco Colapinto (2026 São Paulo Grand Prix)
Australia	19	2 (Brabham [3], Jones)	4 (1959, 1960, 1966, 1980)	52 (Brabham [14], Jones [12], Webber [9], Ricciardo [8], Piastri [9])	Tony Gaze (1952 Belgian Grand Prix)	Oscar Piastri (2026 São Paulo Grand Prix)
Austria	16	2 (Rindt, Lauda [3])	4 (1970, 1975, 1977, 1984)	41 (Rindt [6], Lauda [25], Berger [10])	Jochen Rindt (1964 Austrian Grand Prix)	Christian Klien (2010 Abu Dhabi Grand Prix)
Belgium	24	0	0	11 (Ickx [8], Boutsen [3])	Johnny Claes (1950 British Grand Prix)	Stoffel Vandoorne (2018 Abu Dhabi Grand Prix)
Brazil	34	3 (Fittipaldi [2], Piquet [3], Senna [3])	8 (1972, 1974, 1981, 1983, 1987, 1988, 1990, 1991)	101 (Fittipaldi [14], Pace [1], Piquet [23], Senna [41], Barrichello [11], Massa [11])	Chico Landi (1951 German Grand Prix)	Gabriel Bortoleto, Rafael Câmara (2026 São Paulo Grand Prix)
Canada	15	1 (J. Villeneuve)	1 (1997)	17 (G. Villeneuve [6], J. Villeneuve [11])	Peter Ryan (1961 United States Grand Prix)	Lance Stroll (2026 São Paulo Grand Prix)
Chile	1	0	0	0	Eliseo Salazar (1981 USA West Grand Prix)	Eliseo Salazar (1983 Belgian Grand Prix)
China	1	0	0	0	Zhou Guanyu (2022 Bahrain Grand Prix)	Zhou Guanyu (2024 Abu Dhabi Grand Prix)
Colombia	3	0	0	7 (Montoya [7])	Ricardo Londoño (1981 Brazilian Grand Prix)	Juan Pablo Montoya (2006 United States Grand Prix)
Czech Republic	1	0	0	0	Tomáš Enge (2001 Italian Grand Prix)	Tomáš Enge (2001 Japanese Grand Prix)
Denmark	5	0	0	0	Tom Belsø (1973 Swedish Grand Prix)	Kevin Magnussen (2024 Abu Dhabi Grand Prix)
East Germany	4	0	0	0	Ernst Klodwig, Rudolf Krause (1952 German Grand Prix)	Edgar Barth, Theo Fitzau, Ernst Klodwig, Rudolf Krause (1953 German Grand Prix)
Finland	9	3 (K. Rosberg, Häkkinen [2], Räikkönen)	4 (1982, 1998, 1999, 2007)	57 (K. Rosberg [5], Häkkinen [20], Kovalainen [1], Räikkönen [21], Bottas [10])	Leo Kinnunen (1974 Belgian Grand Prix)	Valtteri Bottas (2026 São Paulo Grand Prix)
France	75	1 (Prost [4])	4 (1985, 1986, 1989, 1993)	81 (Trintignant [2], Cevert [1], Beltoise [2], Depailler [2], Jabouille [2], Pironi [3], Tambay [2], Laffite [6], Arnoux [7], Prost [51], Alesi [1], Panis [1], Gasly [1], Ocon [1])	Philippe Étancelin, Yves Giraud-Cabantous, Eugène Martin, Louis Rosier (1950 British Grand Prix)	Pierre Gasly, Isack Hadjar, Esteban Ocon (2026 São Paulo Grand Prix)
Germany / West Germany	54	3 (Michael Schumacher [7], Vettel [4], N. Rosberg)	12 (1994, 1995, 2000, 2001, 2002, 2003, 2004, 2010, 2011, 2012, 2013, 2016)	179 (von Trips [2], Mass [1], M. Schumacher [91], Frentzen [3], R. Schumacher [6], N. Rosberg [23], Vettel [53])	Paul Pietsch (1950 Italian Grand Prix)	Nico Hülkenberg (2026 São Paulo Grand Prix)
Hungary	1	0	0	0	Zsolt Baumgartner (2003 Hungarian Grand Prix)	Zsolt Baumgartner (2004 Brazilian Grand Prix)
India	2	0	0	0	Narain Karthikeyan (2005 Australian Grand Prix)	Narain Karthikeyan (2012 Brazilian Grand Prix)
Indonesia	1	0	0	0	Rio Haryanto (2016 Australian Grand Prix)	Rio Haryanto (2016 German Grand Prix)
Ireland	5	0	0	0	Joe Kelly (1950 British Grand Prix)	Ralph Firman (2003 Japanese Grand Prix)
Italy	100	3 (Farina, Ascari [2], Antonelli)	4 (1950, 1952, 1953, 2026)	52 (Farina [5], Ascari [13], Fagioli [1], Musso [1], Taruffi [1], Baghetti [1], Bandini [1], Scarfiotti [1], Brambilla [1], de Angelis [2], Patrese [6], Nannini [1], Alboreto [5], Fisichella [3], Trulli [1], Antonelli [9])	Luigi Fagioli, Nino Farina (1950 British Grand Prix)	Kimi Antonelli (2026 São Paulo Grand Prix)
Japan	22	0	0	0	Hiroshi Fushida (1975 Dutch Grand Prix)	Ryo Hirakawa (2026 Mexico City Grand Prix)
Liechtenstein	1	0	0	0	Rikky von Opel (1973 French Grand Prix)	Rikky von Opel (1974 French Grand Prix)
Malaysia	1	0	0	0	Alex Yoong (2001 Italian Grand Prix)	Alex Yoong (2002 Japanese Grand Prix)
Mexico	6	0	0	8 (Rodriguez [2], Pérez [6])	Ricardo Rodríguez (1961 Italian Grand Prix)	Sergio Pérez (2026 São Paulo Grand Prix)
Monaco	5	0	0	9 (Leclerc [9])	Louis Chiron (1950 British Grand Prix)	Charles Leclerc (2026 São Paulo Grand Prix)
Morocco	1	0	0	0	Robert La Caze (1958 Moroccan Grand Prix)	Robert La Caze (1958 Moroccan Grand Prix)
Netherlands	17	1 (M. Verstappen [4])	4 (2021, 2022, 2023, 2024)	74 (M. Verstappen [74])	Jan Flinterman, Dries van der Lof (1952 Dutch Grand Prix)	Max Verstappen (2026 São Paulo Grand Prix)
New Zealand	10	1 (Hulme)	1 (1967)	12 (McLaren [4], Hulme [8])	Bruce McLaren (1958 German Grand Prix)	Liam Lawson (2026 São Paulo Grand Prix)
Poland	1	0	0	1 (Kubica [1])	Robert Kubica (2006 Hungarian Grand Prix)	Robert Kubica (2021 Italian Grand Prix)
Portugal	5	0	0	0	Mário Araújo de Cabral (1959 Portuguese Grand Prix)	Tiago Monteiro (2006 Brazilian Grand Prix)
Rhodesia	6	0	0	0	John Love (1962 South African Grand Prix)	John Love (1972 South African Grand Prix)
Russia / Russian Automobile Federation	4	0	0	0	Vitaly Petrov (2010 Bahrain Grand Prix)	Nikita Mazepin (2021 Abu Dhabi Grand Prix)
South Africa	23	1 (Scheckter)	1 (1979)	10 (Scheckter [10])	Tony Maggs (1961 British Grand Prix)	Jody Scheckter (1980 United States Grand Prix)
Spain	15	1 (Alonso [2])	2 (2005, 2006)	36 (Alonso [32], Sainz [4])	Paco Godia, Juan Jover (1951 Spanish Grand Prix)	Fernando Alonso, Carlos Sainz Jr. (2026 São Paulo Grand Prix)
Sweden	11	0	0	12 (Bonnier [1], Peterson [10], Nilsson [1])	Erik Lundgren (1951 German Grand Prix)	Marcus Ericsson (2018 Abu Dhabi Grand Prix)
Switzerland	29	0	0	7 (Siffert [2], Regazzoni [5])	Toulo de Graffenried (1950 British Grand Prix)	Sébastien Buemi (2011 Brazilian Grand Prix)
Thailand	2	0	0	0	Prince Bira (1950 British Grand Prix)	Alexander Albon (2026 São Paulo Grand Prix)
United Kingdom	164	11 (Hawthorn, G. Hill [2], Clark [2], Surtees, Stewart [3], Hunt, Mansell, D. Hill, Hamilton [7], Button, Norris)	21 (1958, 1962, 1963, 1964, 1965, 1968, 1969, 1971, 1973, 1976, 1992, 1996, 2008, 2009, 2014, 2015, 2017, 2018, 2019, 2020, 2025)	332 (Moss [16], Collins [3], Hawthorn [3], Ireland [1], Brooks [6], Clark [25], Surtees [6], G. Hill [14], Stewart [27], Gethin [1], Hunt [10], Watson [5], Mansell [31], D. Hill [22], Herbert [3], Irvine [4], Coulthard [13], Button [15], Hamilton [106], Russell [8], Norris [14])	Geoffrey Crossley, Joe Fry, Bob Gerard, David Hampshire, Cuth Harrison, Leslie Johnson, David Murray, Reg Parnell, Peter Walker (1950 British Grand Prix)	Oliver Bearman, Arvid Lindblad, Lewis Hamilton, Lando Norris, George Russell (2026 São Paulo Grand Prix)
United States	58 (+102 1950–1960 Indianapolis 500 only)	2 (P. Hill, Andretti)	2 (1961, 1978)	33 (Parsons [1], Wallard [1], Ruttman [1], Vukovich [2], Sweikert [1], Flaherty [1], Hanks [1], Bryan [1], Ward [1], Rathmann [1], P. Hill [3], Gurney [4], Ginther [1], Revson [2], Andretti [12])	Harry Schell (1950 Monaco Grand Prix)	Logan Sargeant (2024 Dutch Grand Prix)
Uruguay	4	0	0	0	Eitel Cantoni (1952 British Grand Prix)	Asdrúbal Fontes Bayardo (1959 French Grand Prix)
Venezuela	3	0	0	1 (Maldonado [1])	Ettore Chimeri (1960 Argentine Grand Prix)	Pastor Maldonado (2015 Abu Dhabi Grand Prix)
Country	Total drivers	Champions	Championships	Race wins	First driver(s)	Most recent driver(s)/ Current driver(s)
