= 1956 Buenos Aires Grand Prix =

- Non-championship race in the 1956 Formula One season
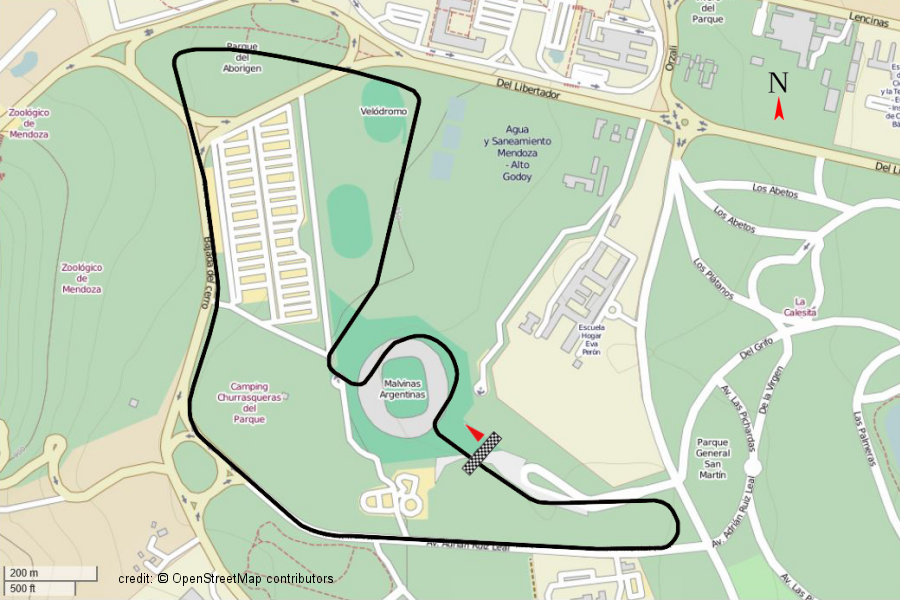

Race details
- Date: 5 February 1956
- Official name: X Gran Premio Ciudad de Buenos Aires
- Location: Mendoza, Argentina
- Course: Circuito Gral San Martin (Mendoza)
- Course length: 4.183 km (2.600 miles)
- Distance: 60 laps, 251.020 km (155.976 miles)

Pole position
| Driver | (Argentina) Juan Manuel Fangio | Ferrari |

Fastest lap
| Driver | (Argentina) Juan Manuel Fangio | Ferrari |
- Time: 1:49.2

Podium
| First | (Argentina) Juan Manuel Fangio | Ferrari |
| Second | (United Kingdom) Stirling Moss | Maserati |
| Third | (France) Jean Behra | Maserati |

The 1956 Buenos Aires Grand Prix was a Formula Libre race held on 5 February 1956 in Mendoza, Argentina. The race was won over a distance of 60 laps by Argentine driver Juan Manuel Fangio from the Scuderia Ferrari team in his Lancia-Ferrari D50.

== Entry list ==
| No | Driver | Entrant | Car | Engine |
|---|---|---|---|---|
| 2 | (United Kingdom) Stirling Moss | Officine Alfieri Maserati | Maserati 250F | Maserati |
| 4 | (France) Jean Behra | Officine Alfieri Maserati | Maserati 250F | Maserati |
| 6 | (Argentina) Carlos Menditéguy | Officine Alfieri Maserati | Maserati 250F | Maserati |
| 8 | (Italy) Luigi Piotti | Officine Alfieri Maserati | Maserati 250F | Maserati |
| 10 | (Brazil) Chico Landi | Officine Alfieri Maserati | Maserati 250F | Maserati |
| 12 | (Argentina) Pablo Gulle | Officine Alfieri Maserati | Maserati 250F | Maserati |
| 14 | (United Kingdom) Mike Hawthorn | Owen Racing Organisation | Maserati 250F | Maserati |
| 16 | (Uruguay) Alberto Uría | Alberto Uría | Maserati A6GCM | Maserati |
| 30 | (Argentina) Juan Manuel Fangio | Scuderia Ferrari | Lancia D50 | Lancia |
| 32 | (Italy) Eugenio Castellotti | Scuderia Ferrari | Lancia D50 | Lancia |
| 34 | (Italy) Luigi Musso | Scuderia Ferrari | Lancia D50 | Lancia |
| 36 | (United Kingdom) Peter Collins | Scuderia Ferrari | Ferrari 555 | Ferrari |
| 38 | (Belgium) Olivier Gendebien | Scuderia Ferrari | Ferrari 555 | Ferrari |

== Race result ==
| Pos | No | Driver | Constructor | Laps | Time/Retired |
|---|---|---|---|---|---|
| 1 | 30 | (Argentina) Juan Manuel Fangio | Ferrari | 60 | 1:52'38.9 |
| 2 | 2 | (United Kingdom) Stirling Moss | Maserati | 60 | +38.6 |
| 3 | 4 | (France) Jean Behra | Maserati | 60 | +1:45.7 |
| 4 | 6 | (Argentina) Carlos Menditéguy | Maserati | 59 | +1 Lap |
| 5 | 36 | (United Kingdom) Peter Collins | Ferrari | 58 | +2 Laps |
| 6 | 38 | (Belgium) Olivier Gendebien | Ferrari | 57 | +3 Laps |
| 7 | 10 | (Brazil) Chico Landi | Maserati | 57 | +3 Laps |
| 8 | 12 | (Argentina) Pablo Gulle | Maserati | 54 | +6 Laps |
| 9 | 14 | (United Kingdom) Mike Hawthorn | Maserati | 54 | +6 Laps |
| 10 | 8 | (Italy) Luigi Piotti | Maserati | 52 | +8 Laps |
| Ret | 32 | (Italy) Eugenio Castellotti | Ferrari | 14 | Oil Cooler |
| Ret | 34 | (Italy) Luigi Musso | Ferrari | 9 | Accident |
| DNS | 16 | (Uruguay) Alberto Uría | Maserati | 0 | - |

| Previous race: None | Formula One non-championship races 1956 season | Next race: 1956 Glover Trophy |
| Previous race: 1955 Buenos Aires Grand Prix | Buenos Aires Grand Prix | Next race: 1957 Buenos Aires Grand Prix |
