= Carlos Menditeguy =

Argentine racing driver (1914–1973)

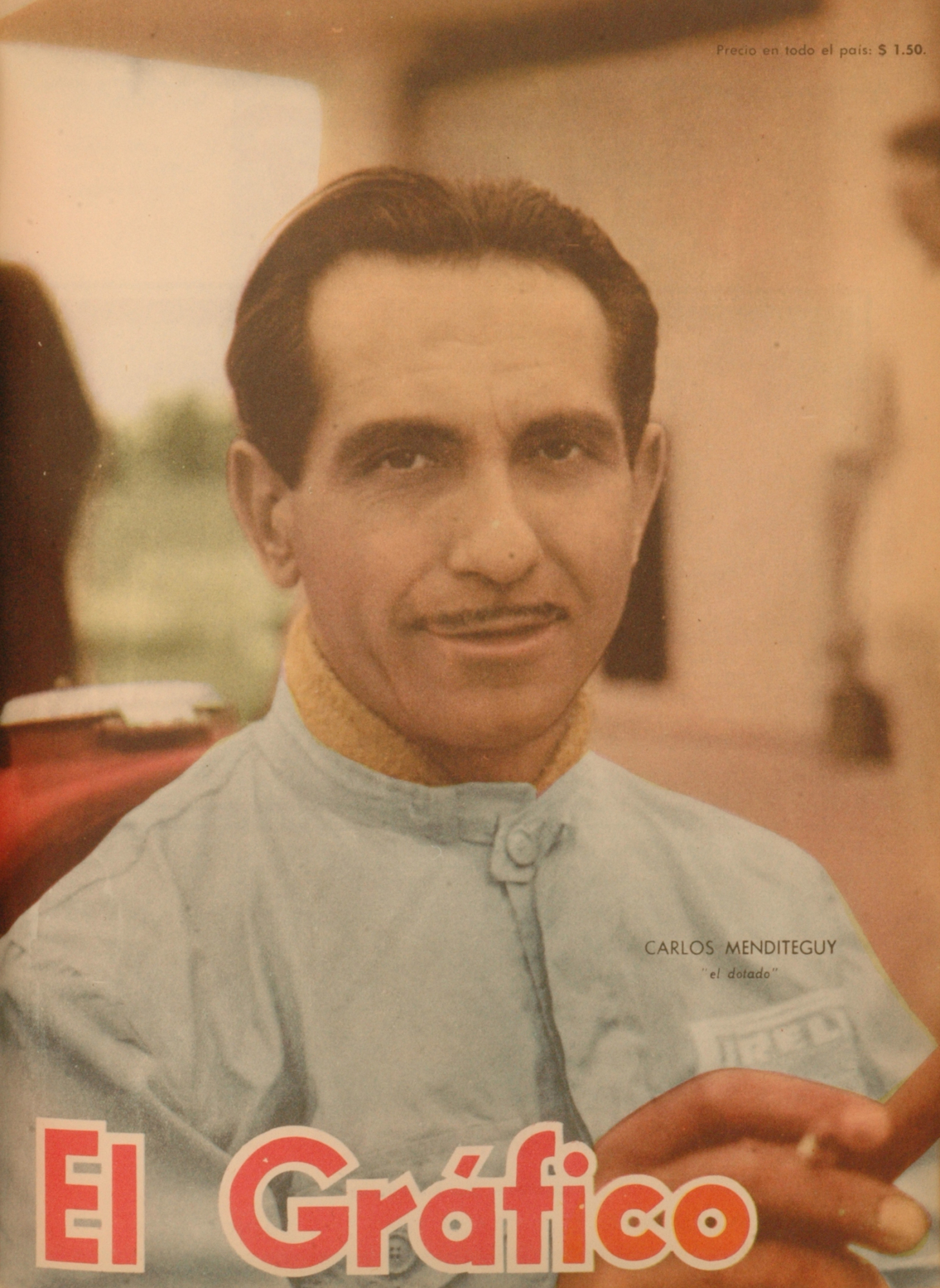
- Born: Carlos Alberto Menditéguy; 10 August 1914; Buenos Aires, Argentina
- Died: 27 April 1973 (aged 58); Buenos Aires, Argentina

Formula One World Championship career
- Nationality: (Argentina) Argentine
- Active years: 1953–1958, 1960
- Team(s): Gordini, Maserati, Scuderia Centro Sud
- Entries: 11 (10 starts)
- Championships: 0
- Wins: 0
- Podiums: 1
- Career points: 9
- Pole positions: 0
- Fastest laps: 0
- First entry: 1953 Argentine Grand Prix
- Last entry: 1960 Argentine Grand Prix

Carlos Alberto Menditéguy (10 August 1914 – 27 April 1973) was a racing driver and polo player from Buenos Aires, Argentina. He entered 11 Formula One World Championship Grands Prix, achieving one podium, and scoring a total of nine championship points. He led the 1956 Argentine Grand Prix for 38 laps until his driveshaft gave out.

In polo, Menditéguy reached the highest possible handicap of 10. He was an all round sportsman and became a scratch golf player in under two years as the result of a bet with some friends.

Menditéguy died on April 27, 1973, and was buried in La Recoleta Cemetery in Buenos Aires.

== Complete Formula One World Championship results ==
(key)

Year	Entrant	Chassis	Engine	1	2	3	4	5	6	7	8	9	10	11	WDC	Points
1953	Equipe Gordini	Gordini Type 16	Gordini Straight-6	ARG; Ret	500	NED	BEL	FRA	GBR	GER	SUI	ITA			NC	0
1954	Onofre Marimón	Maserati A6GCM/250F	Maserati Straight-6	ARG; DNS	500	BEL	FRA	GBR	GER	SUI	ITA	ESP			NC	0
1955	Officine Alfieri Maserati	Maserati 250F	Maserati Straight-6	ARG; Ret	MON	500	BEL	NED	GBR	ITA; 5					19th	2
1956	Officine Alfieri Maserati	Maserati 250F	Maserati Straight-6	ARG; Ret	MON	500	BEL	FRA	GBR	GER	ITA				NC	0
1957	Officine Alfieri Maserati	Maserati 250F	Maserati Straight-6	ARG; 3	MON; Ret	500	FRA; Ret	GBR; Ret	GER	PES	ITA				14th	4
1958	Scuderia Sud Americana	Maserati 250F	Maserati Straight-6	ARG; 7	MON	NED	500	BEL	FRA	GBR	GER	POR	ITA	MOR	NC	0
1960	Scuderia Centro Sud	Cooper T51	Maserati Straight-4	ARG; 4	MON	500	NED	BEL	FRA	GBR	POR	ITA	USA		19th	3

=== Non-Championship Formula One results ===
(key)

Year	Entrant	Chassis	Engine	1	2	3	4	5	6	7	8	9	10	11
1956	Officine Alfieri Maserati	Maserati 250F	Maserati Straight-6	BUE; 4	GLV	SYR	AIN	INT	NAP	100	VNW	CAE	SUS	BRH
1957	Officine Alfieri Maserati	Maserati 250F	Maserati Straight-6	BUE; 6	SYR	PAU	GLV	NAP	RMS; Ret	CAE	INT	MOD	MOR	
