= Óscar González (racing driver) =

Uruguayan racing driver (1923–2006)

Óscar Mario González Alonso
- Born: 10 November 1923; Montevideo, Uruguay
- Died: 5 November 2006 (aged 82); Montevideo, Uruguay

Formula One World Championship career
- Nationality: (Uruguay) Uruguayan
- Active years: 1956
- Team: Privateer Maserati
- Entries: 1
- Championships: 0
- Wins: 0
- Podiums: 0
- Career points: 0
- Pole positions: 0
- Fastest laps: 0
- First entry: 1956 Argentine Grand Prix

Óscar Mario "Bocha" González Alonso (10 November 1923 – 5 November 2006) was a racing driver from Uruguay.

González participated in one Formula One Grand Prix, the 1956 Argentine Grand Prix on 22 January 1956, finishing sixth in a shared drive with countryman Alberto Uría. He scored no championship points.

== Complete Formula One results ==
(key)

Year	Entrant	Chassis	Engine	1	2	3	4	5	6	7	8	WDC	Points
1956	Alberto Uría	Maserati A6GCM/250F	Maserati Straight-6	ARG; 6*	MON	500	BEL	FRA	GBR	GER	ITA	NC	0

* Indicates shared drive with Alberto Uría
