= 1955 Argentine Grand Prix =

← Previous race	Next race →

Race details
- Date: 16 January 1955
- Official name: III Gran Premio de la Republica Argentina
- Location: Autódromo 17 de Octubre, Buenos Aires
- Course: Permanent racing facility
- Course length: 3.912 km (2.431 miles)
- Distance: 96 laps, 375.552 km (233.376 miles)
- Weather: Very hot and dry

Pole position
Driver	(Argentina) José Froilán González	Ferrari
- Time: 1:43.1

Fastest lap
Driver	(Argentina) Juan Manuel Fangio	Mercedes
- Time: 1:48.3 on lap 45

Podium
First	(Argentina) Juan Manuel Fangio	Mercedes
Second	(Argentina) José Froilán González (Italy) Nino Farina (France) Maurice Trintignant	Ferrari
Third	(Italy) Nino Farina (France) Maurice Trintignant (Italy) Umberto Maglioli	Ferrari

The 1955 Argentine Grand Prix was a Formula One motor race held at Buenos Aires on 16 January 1955. It was race one of seven in the 1955 World Championship of Drivers and the third running of the Argentine Grand Prix. It was also the first of three international races within two weeks, with the 1955 1000 km Buenos Aires opening the sports cars WC season, and the 1955 Buenos Aires Grand Prix Formula Libre race at the end of January seeing another win for Fangio and Mercedes, this time powered by the enlarged 3.0 sports car version of the F1 engine.

The high temperatures of the Argentinian summer proved to be very taxing for both drivers and cars. The race in very hot weather was won from third on the grid by Juan Manuel Fangio for Mercedes. While others had to take breaks and shared cars, 43 year old local Fangio continued for all of the 96 laps on his own, and set fastest lap, even though suffering burns to his leg.

Ferrari had brought four drivers and three cars of which two finished on the podium after one engine failed. In two three-way shared drives with José Froilán González (who had put No. 12 car on pole) and Umberto Maglioli (who was entered on the No. 10 car), Ferrari drivers Nino Farina (qualified No. 10 on 5) and Maurice Trintignant (No. 14 car DNF) finished both second and third respectively. For 1955, defending champion Mercedes had picked up Stirling Moss to expand its effort to four drivers and four cars. They qualified rather low, third to tenth. After the cars of Moss and Kling were out, these two drivers shared the No. 8 car of Hans Herrmann, finishing fourth. Fangio and Roberto Mieres, the best of the Maserati drivers, were the only two drivers able to complete the race without handing their car to another driver, either due to exhaustion, or due to team orders after a car or driver had run into problems. Only two other Maserati did finish. Five cars were out after only two laps. Only seven of twenty-one cars finished, and only two covered the complete distance. Neither of the three Lancia or Gordini made it to mid-race.

According to former Ferrari and Maserati chief mechanic Giulio Borsari, Fangio acclimatized himself by moving to Argentina one month prior to the race and reducing his water consumption to one liter a day to cope with the extreme heat. Fangio also suffered severe burns to his leg which, for the entire duration of the 3 hour race, was rubbing against the chassis frame which was being heated by the exhaust. It left a permanent scar on his leg later in life. Apart from winning the Formula Libre race 2 weeks later, run in 2 heats of 30 laps, it took Fangio 3 months to recover. He finished second in the 1955 Mille Miglia. The next F1 race was in late May, in Monaco.

== Entries ==
Team	No	Driver	Car	Engine	Tyre
(Germany) Daimler Benz AG	2	(Argentina) Juan Manuel Fangio	Mercedes-Benz W196	Mercedes M196 2.5 L8	C
(Germany) Daimler Benz AG	4	(Germany) Karl Kling	Mercedes-Benz W196	Mercedes M196 2.5 L8	C
(Germany) Daimler Benz AG	6	(United Kingdom) Stirling Moss	Mercedes-Benz W196	Mercedes M196 2.5 L8	C
(Germany) Daimler Benz AG	8	(Germany) Hans Herrmann	Mercedes-Benz W196	Mercedes M196 2.5 L8	C
(Italy) Scuderia Ferrari	10	(Italy) Giuseppe Farina	Ferrari 625 F1	Ferrari 555 2.5 L4	E
(Italy) Scuderia Ferrari	12	(Argentina) José Froilán González	Ferrari 625 F1	Ferrari 555 2.5 L4	E
(Italy) Scuderia Ferrari	14	(France) Maurice Trintignant	Ferrari 625 F1	Ferrari 555 2.5 L4	E
(Italy) Officine Alfieri Maserati	16	(France) Jean Behra	Maserati 250F	Maserati 250F1 2.5 L6	P
(Italy) Officine Alfieri Maserati	18	(Argentina) Roberto Mieres	Maserati 250F	Maserati 250F1 2.5 L6	P
(Italy) Officine Alfieri Maserati	20	(Italy) Sergio Mantovani	Maserati 250F	Maserati 250F1 2.5 L6	P
(Italy) Officine Alfieri Maserati	22	(Italy) Luigi Musso	Maserati 250F	Maserati 250F1 2.5 L6	P
(Italy) Officine Alfieri Maserati	24	(Argentina) Carlos Menditeguy	Maserati 250F	Maserati 250F1 2.5 L6	P
(Italy) Officine Alfieri Maserati	26	(Argentina) Clemar Bucci	Maserati 250F	Maserati 250F1 2.5 L6	P
(Italy) Officine Alfieri Maserati	28	(United States) Harry Schell	Maserati 250F	Maserati 250F1 2.5 L6	P
(Uruguay) Alberto Uría	30	(Uruguay) Alberto Uría	Maserati A6GCM	Maserati 250F1 2.5 L6	P
(Italy) Scuderia Lancia	32	(Italy) Alberto Ascari	Lancia D50	Lancia DS50 2.5 V8	P
(Italy) Scuderia Lancia	34	(Italy) Luigi Villoresi	Lancia D50	Lancia DS50 2.5 V8	P
(Italy) Scuderia Lancia	36	(Italy) Eugenio Castellotti	Lancia D50	Lancia DS50 2.5 V8	P
(France) Equipe Gordini	38	(France) Élie Bayol	Gordini T16	Gordini 23 2.5 L6	E
(France) Equipe Gordini	40	(Argentina) Pablo Birger	Gordini T16	Gordini 23 2.5 L6	E
(France) Equipe Gordini	42	(Argentina) Jesús Iglesias	Gordini T16	Gordini 23 2.5 L6	E

== Classification ==
=== Qualifying ===
Pos	No	Driver	Constructor	Time	Gap
1	12	(Argentina) José Froilán González	Ferrari	1:43.1	
2	32	(Italy) Alberto Ascari	Lancia	1:43.6	+0.5
3	2	(Argentina) Juan Manuel Fangio	Mercedes	1:43.7	+0.6
4	16	(France) Jean Behra	Maserati	1:43.8	+0.7
5	10	(Italy) Giuseppe Farina	Ferrari	1:43.9	+0.8
6	4	(Germany) Karl Kling	Mercedes	1:44.1	+1.0
7	28	(United States) Harry Schell	Maserati	1:44.3	+1.2
8	6	(United Kingdom) Stirling Moss	Mercedes	1:44.6	+1.5
9	40	(Argentina) Pablo Birger	Gordini	1:44.8	+1.7
10	8	(Germany) Hans Herrmann	Mercedes	1:44.9	+1.8
11	34	(Italy) Luigi Villoresi	Lancia	1:45.2	+2.1
12	36	(Italy) Eugenio Castellotti	Lancia	1:45.3	+2.2
13	24	(Argentina) Carlos Menditeguy	Maserati	1:45.4	+2.3
14	14	(France) Maurice Trintignant	Ferrari	1:45.8	+2.7
15	38	(France) Élie Bayol	Gordini	1:46.1	+3.0
16	18	(Argentina) Roberto Mieres	Maserati	1:46.2	+3.1
17	42	(Argentina) Jesús Iglesias	Gordini	1:46.3	+3.2
18	22	(Italy) Luigi Musso	Maserati	1:46.4	+3.3
19	20	(Italy) Sergio Mantovani	Maserati	1:46.4	+3.3
20	26	(Argentina) Clemar Bucci	Maserati	1:47.6	+4.5
21	30	(Uruguay) Alberto Uría	Maserati	1:52.3	+9.2

=== Race ===
Pos	No	Driver	Constructor	Laps	Time/Retired	Grid	Points
1	2	(Argentina) Juan Manuel Fangio	Mercedes	96	3:00:38.6	3	9^{1}
2	12	(Argentina) José Froilán González (Italy) Nino Farina (France) Maurice Trintignant	Ferrari	96	+1:29.6	1	2; 2; 2
3	10	(Italy) Nino Farina (France) Maurice Trintignant (Italy) Umberto Maglioli	Ferrari	94	+2 laps	5	1 1/3; 1 1/3; 1 1/3
4	8	(Germany) Hans Herrmann (Germany) Karl Kling (United Kingdom) Stirling Moss	Mercedes	94	+2 laps	10	1; 1; 1
5	18	(Argentina) Roberto Mieres	Maserati	91	+5 laps	16	2
6	28	(United States) Harry Schell (France) Jean Behra	Maserati	88	+8 laps	7	
7	22	(Italy) Luigi Musso (Italy) Sergio Mantovani (United States) Harry Schell	Maserati	83	+13 laps	18	
Ret	20	(Italy) Sergio Mantovani (France) Jean Behra (Italy) Luigi Musso	Maserati	54	Engine	19	
Ret	26	(Argentina) Clemar Bucci (United States) Harry Schell (Argentina) Carlos Menditeguy	Maserati	54	Fuel pressure	20	
Ret	42	(Argentina) Jesús Iglesias	Gordini	38	Transmission	17	
Ret	14	(France) Maurice Trintignant	Ferrari	36	Engine	14	
Ret	36	(Italy) Eugenio Castellotti (Italy) Luigi Villoresi	Lancia	35	Accident	12	
Ret	6	(United Kingdom) Stirling Moss	Mercedes	29	Fuel system	8	
Ret	30	(Uruguay) Alberto Uría	Maserati	22	Out of fuel	21	
Ret	32	(Italy) Alberto Ascari	Lancia	21	Accident	2	
Ret	38	(France) Élie Bayol	Gordini	7	Transmission	15	
Ret	16	(France) Jean Behra	Maserati	2	Accident	4	
Ret	4	(Germany) Karl Kling	Mercedes	2	Accident	6	
Ret	34	(Italy) Luigi Villoresi	Lancia	2	Fuel leak	11	
Ret	40	(Argentina) Pablo Birger	Gordini	1	Accident	9	
Ret	24	(Argentina) Carlos Menditeguy	Maserati	1	Accident	13	

Notes

- ^1 – Includes 1 point for fastest lap

== Shared drives ==
  - Car #12: José Froilán González (60 laps), Nino Farina (20 laps), and Maurice Trintignant (16 laps). They shared the 6 points for second place, thus 2 points each.
  - Car #10: Nino Farina (50 laps), Umberto Maglioli (22 laps), and Maurice Trintignant (22 laps). They shared the 4 points for third place, 1 1/3 points each, thus Farina and Trintignant both had 3 1/3 in total.
  - Car #8: Hans Herrmann (30 laps), Stirling Moss (34 laps), Karl Kling (30 laps) shared the 3 points for fourth place, one point each.
  - Car #28: Harry Schell (50 laps), and Jean Behra (38 laps).
  - Car #22: Luigi Musso (50 laps), Sergio Mantovani (20 laps), and Harry Schell (13 laps).
  - Car #20: Sergio Mantovani (30 laps), Jean Behra (14 laps), and Luigi Musso (10 laps).
  - Car #26: Clemar Bucci (30 laps), Harry Schell (14 laps), and Carlos Menditeguy (10 laps).
  - Car #36: Eugenio Castellotti (20 laps) and Luigi Villoresi (15 laps).

== Championship standings after the race ==
Drivers' Championship standings

Pos	Driver	Points
1	(Argentina) Juan Manuel Fangio	9
2=	(France) Maurice Trintignant	3 1/3
2=	(Italy) Nino Farina	3 1/3
4	(Argentina) José Froilán González	2
5	(Argentina) Roberto Mieres	2

- Note: Only the top five positions are included. Only the best 5 results counted towards the Championship.

Previous race: 1954 Spanish Grand Prix	FIA Formula One World Championship; 1955 season	Next race: 1955 Monaco Grand Prix
Previous race: 1954 Argentine Grand Prix	Argentine Grand Prix	Next race: 1956 Argentine Grand Prix
