= 1956 Argentine Grand Prix =

← Previous race	Next race →

Race details
- Date: 22 January 1956
- Official name: IV Gran Premio de la Republica Argentina
- Location: Autódromo Municipal Ciudad de Buenos Aires, Buenos Aires
- Course: Permanent racing facility
- Course length: 3.912 km (2.431 miles)
- Distance: 98 laps, 383.376 km (238.219 miles)
- Weather: Overcast but dry

Pole position
Driver	(Argentina) Juan Manuel Fangio	Ferrari
- Time: 1:42.5

Fastest lap
Driver	(Argentina) Juan Manuel Fangio	Ferrari
- Time: 1:45.3

Podium
First	(Italy) Luigi Musso (Argentina) Juan Manuel Fangio	Ferrari
Second	(France) Jean Behra	Maserati
Third	(United Kingdom) Mike Hawthorn	Maserati

The 1956 Argentine Grand Prix was a Formula One motor race held on 22 January 1956 at Buenos Aires. It was race 1 of 8 in the 1956 World Championship of Drivers. With the withdrawal of Mercedes from Formula One, Fangio and Moss would begin the season with new teams. Fangio would join Ferrari while Moss would lead the Maserati team. The grid in Argentina was composed entirely of Italian cars. Ferrari and Maserati showed up with five cars each. The other three cars were also Maseratis: two private entries and Hawthorn for the B.R.M. team.

Ferrari dominated practice and occupied the first three grid positions, with Fangio's pole time 2.2 sec faster than second. Maserati dominated the early race with Menditeguy and Moss leading the field. Fangio was a non-factor with a faulty fuel pump. He took over Musso's car after 30 laps and re-entered without losing Musso's fifth place in the race. Meanwhile, Musso took over Fangio's ailing car but did not manage to finish in it even a single lap. Fangio quickly passed Behra but lost his position after spinning. On laps 40–43, disaster struck the leaders. While third, Castellotti's gearbox broke, Menditeguy left the lead with a broken driveshaft, and new leader Moss's engine began to smoke. Fangio, who had overtaken Behra, passed the ailing Moss on lap 67, and finished unchallenged after Behra spun late in the race. The race was not without controversy when the Maserati team manager lodged a protest that Fangio was push-started after the earlier spin. The protest was ultimately rejected by both the stewards and the FIA.

== Entries ==
Team	No	Driver	Car	Engine	Tyre
(Italy) Officine Alfieri Maserati	2	(United Kingdom) Stirling Moss	Maserati 250F	Maserati 250F1 2.5 L6	P
(Italy) Officine Alfieri Maserati	4	(France) Jean Behra	Maserati 250F	Maserati 250F1 2.5 L6	P
(Italy) Officine Alfieri Maserati	6	(Argentina) Carlos Menditeguy	Maserati 250F	Maserati 250F1 2.5 L6	P
(Italy) Officine Alfieri Maserati	8	(Italy) Luigi Piotti	Maserati 250F	Maserati 250F1 2.5 L6	P
(Italy) Officine Alfieri Maserati	10	(Brazil) Chico Landi (Italy) Gerino Gerini	Maserati 250F	Maserati 250F1 2.5 L6	P
(Italy) Officine Alfieri Maserati	12	(Argentina) José Froilán González	Maserati 250F	Maserati 250F1 2.5 L6	P
(United Kingdom) Owen Racing Organisation	14	(United Kingdom) Mike Hawthorn	Maserati 250F	Maserati 250F1 2.5 L6	P
(Uruguay) Alberto Uría	16	(Uruguay) Alberto Uría	Maserati A6GCM	Maserati 250F1 2.5 L6	P
(Uruguay) Alberto Uría	16	(Uruguay) Óscar González	Maserati A6GCM	Maserati 250F1 2.5 L6	P
(Italy) Scuderia Ferrari	30	(Argentina) Juan Manuel Fangio	Lancia D50	Ferrari DS50 2.5 V8	E
(Italy) Scuderia Ferrari	32	(Italy) Eugenio Castellotti	Lancia D50	Ferrari DS50 2.5 V8	E
(Italy) Scuderia Ferrari	34	(Italy) Luigi Musso	Lancia D50	Ferrari DS50 2.5 V8	E
(Italy) Scuderia Ferrari	36	(United Kingdom) Peter Collins	Ferrari 555	Ferrari 555 2.5 L4	P
(Italy) Scuderia Ferrari	38	(Belgium) Olivier Gendebien	Ferrari 555	Ferrari 555 2.5 L4	P

== Classification ==
=== Qualifying ===
Pos	No	Driver	Constructor	Time	Gap
1	30	(Argentina) Juan Manuel Fangio	Ferrari	1:42.5	—
2	32	(Italy) Eugenio Castellotti	Ferrari	1:44.7	+2.2
3	34	(Italy) Luigi Musso	Ferrari	1:44.7	+2.2
4	4	(France) Jean Behra	Maserati	1:45.1	+2.6
5	12	(Argentina) José Froilán González	Maserati	1:45.2	+2.7
6	6	(Argentina) Carlos Menditeguy	Maserati	1:45.6	+3.1
7	2	(United Kingdom) Stirling Moss	Maserati	1:45.9	+3.4
8	14	(United Kingdom) Mike Hawthorn	Maserati	1:47.4	+4.9
9	36	(United Kingdom) Peter Collins	Ferrari	1:47.7	+5.2
10	38	(Belgium) Olivier Gendebien	Ferrari	1:50.4	+7.9
11	10	(Brazil) Chico Landi (Italy) Gerino Gerini	Maserati	1:52.1	+9.6
12	8	(Italy) Luigi Piotti	Maserati	1:57.9	+15.4
13	16	(Uruguay) Alberto Uría	Maserati		

=== Race ===
Pos	No	Driver	Constructor	Laps	Time/Retired	Grid	Points
1	34	(Italy) Luigi Musso (Argentina) Juan Manuel Fangio	Ferrari	98	3:00:03.7	3	4; 5^{1}
2	4	(France) Jean Behra	Maserati	98	+24.4	4	6
3	14	(United Kingdom) Mike Hawthorn	Maserati	96	+2 laps	8	4
4	10	(Brazil) Chico Landi (Italy) Gerino Gerini	Maserati	92	+6 laps	11	1.5; 1.5
5	38	(Belgium) Olivier Gendebien	Ferrari	91	+7 laps	10	2
6	16	(Uruguay) Alberto Uría (Uruguay) Óscar González	Maserati	88	+10 laps	13	
Ret	2	(United Kingdom) Stirling Moss	Maserati	81	Engine	7	
Ret	36	(United Kingdom) Peter Collins	Ferrari	58	Accident	9	
Ret	8	(Italy) Luigi Piotti	Maserati	57	Accident	12	
Ret	6	(Argentina) Carlos Menditeguy	Maserati	42	Halfshaft	6	
Ret	32	(Italy) Eugenio Castellotti	Ferrari	40	Gearbox	2	
Ret	12	(Argentina) José Froilán González	Maserati	24	Engine	5	
Ret	30	(Argentina) Juan Manuel Fangio (Italy) Luigi Musso	Ferrari	22	Fuel pump	1	

Notes

- ^1 – Includes 1 point for fastest lap

== Shared drives ==
- Car #34: Luigi Musso (30 laps) and Juan Manuel Fangio (68 laps). They shared the 8 points for first place.
- Car #10: Chico Landi (46 laps) and Gerino Gerini (46 laps). They shared the 3 points for fourth place.
- Car #16: Alberto Uría (44 laps) and Oscar Gonzalez (44 laps).
- Car #30: Juan Manuel Fangio (22 laps) and Luigi Musso (0 laps).

== Championship standings after the race ==
Drivers' Championship standings

Pos	Driver	Points
1	(France) Jean Behra	6
2	(Argentina) Juan Manuel Fangio	5
3	(Italy) Luigi Musso	4
4	(United Kingdom) Mike Hawthorn	4
5	(Belgium) Olivier Gendebien	2

- Note: Only the top five positions are included.

Previous race: 1955 Italian Grand Prix	FIA Formula One World Championship; 1956 season	Next race: 1956 Monaco Grand Prix
Previous race: 1955 Argentine Grand Prix	Argentine Grand Prix	Next race: 1957 Argentine Grand Prix
