= Alberto Uría =

Uruguayan racing driver (1924–1988)

- Born: 11 July 1924; Montevideo, Uruguay
- Died: 4 December 1988 (aged 64); Montevideo, Uruguay

Formula One World Championship career
- Nationality: (Uruguay) Uruguayan
- Active years: 1955–1956
- Team: privateer Maserati
- Entries: 2
- Championships: 0
- Wins: 0
- Podiums: 0
- Career points: 0
- Pole positions: 0
- Fastest laps: 0
- First entry: 1955 Argentine Grand Prix
- Last entry: 1956 Argentine Grand Prix

Alberto Uría (11 July 1924 – 4 December 1988) was a racing driver from Uruguay. He participated in two Formula One World Championship Grands Prix, debuting on 16 January 1955. He entered two Argentine Grand Prix races as a privateer running a Maserati. He scored no championship points, his best finish being a shared sixth place with Óscar González in 1956.

== Complete Formula One World Championship results ==
(key)

Year	Entrant	Chassis	Engine	1	2	3	4	5	6	7	8	WDC	Points
1955	Alberto Uría	Maserati A6GCM/250F	Maserati Straight-6	ARG; Ret	MON	500	BEL	NED	GBR	ITA		NC	0
1956	Alberto Uría	Maserati A6GCM/250F	Maserati Straight-6	ARG; 6*	MON	500	BEL	FRA	GBR	GER	ITA	NC	0

* Indicates shared drive with Óscar González
