= Maserati Grand Prix results =

Maserati competed in Grand Prix racing from 1931 to 1957.

== Complete European Championship results ==
(key) (Races in bold indicate pole position) (results in italics indicate fastest lap)

Year	Entrant	Chassis	Engine	Drivers	1	2	3	4	5	6	7
1931	U. Klinger	Maserati 26M	Maserati 2.5 L8s		ITA	FRA	BEL				
1931	U. Klinger	Maserati 26M	Maserati 2.5 L8s	(Italy) Umberto Klinger	8						
1931	U. Klinger	Maserati 26M	Maserati 2.5 L8s	(Italy) Pietro Ghersi	8						
1931	L. Castelbarco	Maserati 26M	Maserati 2.5 L8s	(Italy) Luigi Castelbarco	DNS						
1931	L. Castelbarco	Maserati 26M	Maserati 2.5 L8s	(Italy) Tino Bianchi	DNS						
1931	Officine A. Maserati	Maserati 26M	Maserati 2.8 L8s; Maserati 2.5 L8s	(Italy) Luigi Fagioli		Ret					
1931	Officine A. Maserati	Maserati 26M	Maserati 2.8 L8s; Maserati 2.5 L8s	(Italy) Ernesto Maserati		Ret					
1931	Officine A. Maserati	Maserati 26M	Maserati 2.8 L8s; Maserati 2.5 L8s	(Italy) Clemente Biondetti		3					
1931	Officine A. Maserati	Maserati 26M	Maserati 2.8 L8s; Maserati 2.5 L8s	(Italy) Luigi Parenti		3					
1931	Officine A. Maserati	Maserati 26M	Maserati 2.8 L8s; Maserati 2.5 L8s	(France) René Dreyfus		8					
1931	Officine A. Maserati	Maserati 26M	Maserati 2.8 L8s; Maserati 2.5 L8s	(Italy) Pietro Ghersi		8					
1931	Sir H. Birkin	Maserati 26M	Maserati 2.5 L8s	(United Kingdom) Henry Birkin		4					
1931	Sir H. Birkin	Maserati 26M	Maserati 2.5 L8s	(United Kingdom) George Eyston		4					
1932	Officine A. Maserati	Maserati V5; Maserati 8C 2800	Maserati 5.0 V16s; Maserati 2.8 L8s		ITA	FRA	GER				
1932	Officine A. Maserati	Maserati V5; Maserati 8C 2800	Maserati 5.0 V16s; Maserati 2.8 L8s	(Italy) Luigi Fagioli	2						
1932	Officine A. Maserati	Maserati V5; Maserati 8C 2800	Maserati 5.0 V16s; Maserati 2.8 L8s	(Italy) Ernesto Maserati	2^{1}						
1932	Officine A. Maserati	Maserati V5; Maserati 8C 2800	Maserati 5.0 V16s; Maserati 2.8 L8s	(Italy) Amedeo Ruggeri	8		Ret				
1932	L. Premoli	Maserati 26M	Maserati 2.5 L8s	(Italy) Luigi Premoli	10						
1932	Conte L. Castelbarco	Maserati 26M	Maserati 2.5 L8s	(Italy) Luigi Castelbarco	Ret						
1935	Scuderia Subalpina	Maserati 8CM; Maserati 6C-34; Maserati V8RI	Maserati 3.2 L8s; Maserati 3.0 L8s; Maserati 3.7 L6s; Maserati 3.3 L6s; Maserati 4.8 V8s		MON	FRA	BEL	GER	SUI	ITA	ESP
1935	Scuderia Subalpina	Maserati 8CM; Maserati 6C-34; Maserati V8RI	Maserati 3.2 L8s; Maserati 3.0 L8s; Maserati 3.7 L6s; Maserati 3.3 L6s; Maserati 4.8 V8s	(Italy) Goffredo Zehender	7	3		11		Ret	
1935	Scuderia Subalpina	Maserati 8CM; Maserati 6C-34; Maserati V8RI	Maserati 3.2 L8s; Maserati 3.0 L8s; Maserati 3.7 L6s; Maserati 3.3 L6s; Maserati 4.8 V8s	(France) Philippe Étancelin	4			Ret	Ret	Ret	
1935	Scuderia Subalpina	Maserati 8CM; Maserati 6C-34; Maserati V8RI	Maserati 3.2 L8s; Maserati 3.0 L8s; Maserati 3.7 L6s; Maserati 3.3 L6s; Maserati 4.8 V8s	(Italy) Piero Dusio	Ret						
1935	Scuderia Subalpina	Maserati 8CM; Maserati 6C-34; Maserati V8RI	Maserati 3.2 L8s; Maserati 3.0 L8s; Maserati 3.7 L6s; Maserati 3.3 L6s; Maserati 4.8 V8s	(France) Raymond Sommer		6					
1935	Scuderia Subalpina	Maserati 8CM; Maserati 6C-34; Maserati V8RI	Maserati 3.2 L8s; Maserati 3.0 L8s; Maserati 3.7 L6s; Maserati 3.3 L6s; Maserati 4.8 V8s	(Italy) Pietro Ghersi				12		Ret	
1935	Scuderia Subalpina	Maserati 8CM; Maserati 6C-34; Maserati V8RI	Maserati 3.2 L8s; Maserati 3.0 L8s; Maserati 3.7 L6s; Maserati 3.3 L6s; Maserati 4.8 V8s	(Italy) Giuseppe Farina						**DNS**	
1935	Scuderia Subalpina	Maserati 8CM; Maserati 6C-34; Maserati V8RI	Maserati 3.2 L8s; Maserati 3.0 L8s; Maserati 3.7 L6s; Maserati 3.3 L6s; Maserati 4.8 V8s	(France) Marcel Lehoux							8
1935	Scuderia Subalpina	Maserati 8CM; Maserati 6C-34; Maserati V8RI	Maserati 3.2 L8s; Maserati 3.0 L8s; Maserati 3.7 L6s; Maserati 3.3 L6s; Maserati 4.8 V8s	(Italy) Eugenio Siena							Ret
1935	Gino Rovere	Maserati 6C-34	Maserati 3.7 L6s	(Italy) Giuseppe Farina	Ret						
1935	L. Soffietti	Maserati 8CM	Maserati 3.0 L8s	(Italy) Luigi Soffietti	8						
1935	Comte de Villapadierna	Maserati 8CM	Maserati 3.0 L8s	(Spain) José de Villapadierna	Ret						
1935	Scuderia Villapadierna	Maserati 8CM	Maserati 3.0 L8s	(France) Marcel Lehoux			**6**				
1935	Gruppo Genovese San Giorgio	Maserati 8C 3000; Maserati 26M	Maserati 3.0 L8s; Maserati 2.5 L8s	(Italy) Renato Balestrero				Ret	12		
1935	H. Rüesch	Maserati 8CM	Maserati 3.0 L8s	(Switzerland) Hans Ruesch				10			
1935	L. Hartmann	Maserati 8CM	Maserati 3.0 L8s	(Hungary) László Hartmann				Ret	Ret		
1935	Earl Howe	Maserati 8CM	Maserati 3.0 L8s	(United Kingdom) Brian Lewis					Ret		
1935	Dr. G. Farina	Maserati 6C-34	Maserati 3.7 L6s	(Italy) Giuseppe Farina					8		
1936	Scuderia Torino	Maserati V8RI; Maserati 4C 2500; Maserati 6C-34	Maserati 4.7 V8s; Maserati 2.4 L4s; Maserati 3.7 L6s		MON	GER	SUI	ITA			
1936	Scuderia Torino	Maserati V8RI; Maserati 4C 2500; Maserati 6C-34	Maserati 4.7 V8s; Maserati 2.4 L4s; Maserati 3.7 L6s	(Italy) Carlo Felice Trossi	Ret	8		7			
1936	Scuderia Torino	Maserati V8RI; Maserati 4C 2500; Maserati 6C-34	Maserati 4.7 V8s; Maserati 2.4 L4s; Maserati 3.7 L6s	(Italy) Pietro Ghersi	8						
1936	Scuderia Torino	Maserati V8RI; Maserati 4C 2500; Maserati 6C-34	Maserati 4.7 V8s; Maserati 2.4 L4s; Maserati 3.7 L6s	(Italy) Eugenio Siena	Ret						
1936	Scuderia Torino	Maserati V8RI; Maserati 4C 2500; Maserati 6C-34	Maserati 4.7 V8s; Maserati 2.4 L4s; Maserati 3.7 L6s	(United Kingdom) Richard Seaman		8^{1}					
1936	Scuderia Torino	Maserati V8RI; Maserati 4C 2500; Maserati 6C-34	Maserati 4.7 V8s; Maserati 2.4 L4s; Maserati 3.7 L6s	(United Kingdom) Richard Seaman		Ret					
1936	Scuderia Torino	Maserati V8RI; Maserati 4C 2500; Maserati 6C-34	Maserati 4.7 V8s; Maserati 2.4 L4s; Maserati 3.7 L6s	(Italy) Piero Dusio				6			
1936	Scuderia Torino	Maserati V8RI; Maserati 4C 2500; Maserati 6C-34	Maserati 4.7 V8s; Maserati 2.4 L4s; Maserati 3.7 L6s	(Italy) Ettore Bianco				7^{1}			
1936	P. Étancelin	Maserati V8RI	Maserati 4.8 V8s	(France) Philippe Étancelin	Ret		Ret				
1936	T. Cholmondley-Tapper	Maserati 8CM	Maserati 3.0 L8s	(New Zealand) T. Cholmondley-Tapper		10					
1936	Scuderia Villapadierna	Maserati 8CM	Maserati 3.0 L8s	(Chile) Juan Zanelli		Ret					
1936	Scuderia Maremmana	Maserati 6C-34; Maserati 8CM	Maserati 3.7 L6s; Maserati 3.0 L8s	(Italy) Clemente Biondetti			Ret	Ret			
1936	Scuderia Maremmana	Maserati 6C-34; Maserati 8CM	Maserati 3.7 L6s; Maserati 3.0 L8s	(Switzerland) Jacques de Rham			Ret				
1936	Scuderia Maremmana	Maserati 6C-34; Maserati 8CM	Maserati 3.7 L6s; Maserati 3.0 L8s	(Italy) Pietro Ghersi				Ret			
1937	F. Gouvion	Maserati 8CM	Maserati 3.0 L8s		BEL	GER	MON	SUI	ITA		
1937	F. Gouvion	Maserati 8CM	Maserati 3.0 L8s	(Belgium) Franz Gouvion	DNS						
1937	G. Minozzi	Maserati 8CM	Maserati 3.0 L8s	(Italy) Giovanni Minozzi		Ret					
1937	L. Soffietti	Maserati 6C-34	Maserati 3.7 L6s	(Italy) Luigi Soffietti		Ret	Ret				
1937	P. Pietsch	Maserati 6C-34	Maserati 3.7 L6s	(Germany) Paul Pietsch		Ret	DNS	10			
1937	Graf Festetics	Maserati 8CM	Maserati 3.0 L8s	(Hungary) Ernõ Festetics		10					
1937	L. Hartmann	Maserati 8CM; Maserati 4CM	Maserati 3.0 L8s; Maserati 2.4 L4s	(Hungary) László Hartmann		Ret	Ret	9			
1937	Scuderia Subauda	Maserati 8CM	Maserati 3.0 L8s	(Italy) Edoardo Teagno		Ret		DNS			
1937	Scuderia Subauda	Maserati 8CM	Maserati 3.0 L8s	(Italy) Luigi Soffietti				DNS			
1937	Scuderia Maremmana	Maserati 6CM; Maserati 6C-34	Maserati 1.5 L6s; Maserati 3.7 L6s	(Italy) Franco Cortese		Ret					
1937	Scuderia Maremmana	Maserati 6CM; Maserati 6C-34	Maserati 1.5 L6s; Maserati 3.7 L6s	(Italy) Francesco Severi		Ret					
1937	Scuderia Maremmana	Maserati 6CM; Maserati 6C-34	Maserati 1.5 L6s; Maserati 3.7 L6s	(Italy) Clemente Biondetti			Ret				
1937	M. Christen	Maserati 26B	Maserati 2.0 L8s	(Switzerland) Max Christen				Ret			
1937	Ecurie Genevoise	Maserati 8CM	Maserati 3.0 L8s	(Switzerland) Adolfo Mandirola				Ret			
1938	Baron de Graffenried	Maserati 6C-34	Maserati 3.0 L6s		FRA	GER	SUI	ITA			
1938	Baron de Graffenried	Maserati 6C-34	Maserati 3.0 L6s	(Switzerland) Toulo de Graffenried		Ret					
1938	Ecurie Du Puy de Graffenried	Maserati 6C-34	Maserati 3.0 L6s	(Switzerland) Toulo de Graffenried			DNS				
1938	A. Hyde	Maserati 8CM	Maserati 3.0 L8s	(United Kingdom) Arthur Hyde		Ret					
1938	Ecurie Helvetia	Maserati 6CM	Maserati 1.5 L6s	(Germany) Herbert Berg		Ret					
1938	P. Pietsch	Maserati 6CM	Maserati 1.5 L6s	(Germany) Paul Pietsch		6					
1938	Scuderia Ambrosiana	Maserati 6CM	Maserati 1.5 L6s	(Italy) Franco Cortese		9					
1938	Squadra Sabauda	Maserati 8CM	Maserati 3.0 L8s	(Italy) Edoardo Teagno			14				
1938	Squadra Sabauda	Maserati 8CM	Maserati 3.0 L8s	(Thailand) Prince Bira			14^{1}				
1938	Auto-Agence S.A.	Maserati 8CM	Maserati 3.0 L8s	(Switzerland) Adolfo Mandirola			Ret				
1938	M. Christen	Maserati 26B	Maserati 2.0 L8s	(Switzerland) Max Christen			13				
1938	Officine A. Maserati	Maserati 8CTF	Maserati 3.0 L8s	(Italy) Carlo Felice Trossi				DSQ			
1938	Officine A. Maserati	Maserati 8CTF	Maserati 3.0 L8s	(Italy) Luigi Villoresi				Ret			
1938	Officine A. Maserati	Maserati 8CTF	Maserati 3.0 L8s	(Italy) Goffredo Zehender				Ret			
1939	A. Mandirola	Maserati 8CM	Maserati 3.0 L8s		BEL	FRA	GER	SUI			
1939	A. Mandirola	Maserati 8CM	Maserati 3.0 L8s	(Switzerland) Adolfo Mandirola	Ret		DSQ				
1939	Officine A. Maserati	Maserati 8CTF	Maserati 3.0 L8s	(Germany) Paul Pietsch			3				
1939	Officine A. Maserati	Maserati 8CTF	Maserati 3.0 L8s	(Italy) Luigi Villoresi			Ret				
1939	Süddeutsche Renngemeinschaft	Maserati 4CM	Maserati 1.5 L4s	(Germany) Leonhard Joa			7	DNS			
1939	M. Christen	Maserati 26B	Maserati 2.0 L8s	(Switzerland) Max Christen				DNS			
1939	Écurie Lucy O'Reilly Schell	Maserati 8CTF	Maserati 3.0 L8s	(France) René Dreyfus				8			
1939	Écurie Lucy O'Reilly Schell	Maserati 8CTF	Maserati 3.0 L8s	(France) "Raph"				DNS			
1939	Baron de Graffenried	Maserati 6C-34	Maserati 3.0 L6s	(Switzerland) Toulo de Graffenried				Ret			
1939	P. Pietsch	Maserati 4CL	Maserati 1.5 L4s	(Germany) Paul Pietsch				Ret			
1939	M. Horvilleur	Maserati 4CM	Maserati 1.5 L4s	(France) Marc Horvilleur				DNS			
1939	J. Wakefield	Maserati 4CL	Maserati 1.5 L4s	(United Kingdom) John Wakefield				12			
1939	G. Barbieri	Maserati 6CM	Maserati 1.5 L6s	(Italy) Guido Barbieri				DNS			
1939	G. Rocco	Maserati 4CL	Maserati 1.5 L4s	(Italy) Giovanni Rocco				Ret			

Notes

- **^1** – Indicates shared drive, no points for the driver who took over.

== Formula One ==
=== Works team entries ===
These are the complete World Championship Grand Prix results for Officine Alfieri Maserati, the works Maserati team.

(key)

Year	Chassis	Engine	Tyres	Drivers	1	2	3	4	5	6	7	8	9	WCC	Points
1950	Maserati 4CLT/48	Maserati 4CLT 1.5 L4 s	P		GBR	MON	500	SUI	BEL	FRA	ITA			—N/a^{2}	
1950	Maserati 4CLT/48	Maserati 4CLT 1.5 L4 s	P	(Monaco) Louis Chiron	Ret	3		9		Ret	Ret			—N/a^{2}	
1950	Maserati 4CLT/48	Maserati 4CLT 1.5 L4 s	P	(Italy) Franco Rol		Ret				Ret	Ret			—N/a^{2}	
1951: Maserati did not compete as a works team.
1952	Maserati A6GCM	Maserati A6 2.0 L6	P		SUI	500	BEL	FRA	GBR	GER	NED	ITA		—N/a^{2}	
1952	Maserati A6GCM	Maserati A6 2.0 L6	P	(Italy) Felice Bonetto						DSQ		5		—N/a^{2}	
1952	Maserati A6GCM	Maserati A6 2.0 L6	P	(Italy) Franco Rol								Ret		—N/a^{2}	
1952	Maserati A6GCM	Maserati A6 2.0 L6	P	(Argentina) José Froilán González								2^{F}		—N/a^{2}	
1953	Maserati A6GCM	Maserati A6 2.0 L6	P		ARG	500	NED	BEL	FRA	GBR	GER	SUI	ITA	—N/a^{2}	
1953	Maserati A6GCM	Maserati A6 2.0 L6	P	(Argentina) Juan Manuel Fangio	Ret		Ret	Ret^{P}^{†}	2^{F}	2	2	4^{P}^{†}	1^{F}	—N/a^{2}	
1953	Maserati A6GCM	Maserati A6 2.0 L6	P	(Argentina) José Froilán González	3		3^{†}	Ret^{F}	3	4^{F}				—N/a^{2}	
1953	Maserati A6GCM	Maserati A6 2.0 L6	P	(Italy) Felice Bonetto	Ret		3^{†}		Ret	6	4	4^{†}	Ret	—N/a^{2}	
1953	Maserati A6GCM	Maserati A6 2.0 L6	P	(Argentina) Oscar Gálvez	5									—N/a^{2}	
1953	Maserati A6GCM	Maserati A6 2.0 L6	P	(Belgium) Johnny Claes				Ret^{†}						—N/a^{2}	
1953	Maserati A6GCM	Maserati A6 2.0 L6	P	(Argentina) Onofre Marimón				3	9	Ret	Ret	Ret	Ret	—N/a^{2}	
1953	Maserati A6GCM	Maserati A6 2.0 L6	P	(Germany) Hermann Lang								5		—N/a^{2}	
1953	Maserati A6GCM	Maserati A6 2.0 L6	P	(Italy) Sergio Mantovani									7^{†}	—N/a^{2}	
1953	Maserati A6GCM	Maserati A6 2.0 L6	P	(Italy) Luigi Musso									7^{†}	—N/a^{2}	
1954	Maserati 250F; Maserati A6GCM	Maserati 250F1 2.5 L6; Maserati A6 2.0 L6	P		ARG	500	BEL	FRA	GBR	GER	SUI	ITA	ESP	—N/a^{2}	
1954	Maserati 250F; Maserati A6GCM	Maserati 250F1 2.5 L6; Maserati A6 2.0 L6	P	(Argentina) Juan Manuel Fangio	1		1^{P}^{F}							—N/a^{2}	
1954	Maserati 250F; Maserati A6GCM	Maserati 250F1 2.5 L6; Maserati A6 2.0 L6	P	(Argentina) Onofre Marimón	Ret		Ret	Ret	3^{F}	DNS				—N/a^{2}	
1954	Maserati 250F; Maserati A6GCM	Maserati 250F1 2.5 L6; Maserati A6 2.0 L6	P	(Italy) Luigi Musso	DNS							Ret	2	—N/a^{2}	
1954	Maserati 250F; Maserati A6GCM	Maserati 250F1 2.5 L6; Maserati A6 2.0 L6	P	(Thailand) Prince Bira	7									—N/a^{2}	
1954	Maserati 250F; Maserati A6GCM	Maserati 250F1 2.5 L6; Maserati A6 2.0 L6	P	(Italy) Sergio Mantovani			7	DNS		5	5	9	Ret	—N/a^{2}	
1954	Maserati 250F; Maserati A6GCM	Maserati 250F1 2.5 L6; Maserati A6 2.0 L6	P	(Italy) Alberto Ascari				Ret	Ret^{F}^{†}					—N/a^{2}	
1954	Maserati 250F; Maserati A6GCM	Maserati 250F1 2.5 L6; Maserati A6 2.0 L6	P	(Italy) Luigi Villoresi				5	Ret^{†}	DNS		Ret		—N/a^{2}	
1954	Maserati 250F; Maserati A6GCM	Maserati 250F1 2.5 L6; Maserati A6 2.0 L6	P	(Argentina) Roberto Mieres							4	Ret	4	—N/a^{2}	
1954	Maserati 250F; Maserati A6GCM	Maserati 250F1 2.5 L6; Maserati A6 2.0 L6	P	(United Kingdom) Stirling Moss							Ret	10	Ret	—N/a^{2}	
1954	Maserati 250F; Maserati A6GCM	Maserati 250F1 2.5 L6; Maserati A6 2.0 L6	P	(United States) Harry Schell							Ret			—N/a^{2}	
1954	Maserati 250F; Maserati A6GCM	Maserati 250F1 2.5 L6; Maserati A6 2.0 L6	P	(France) Louis Rosier								8		—N/a^{2}	
1954	Maserati 250F; Maserati A6GCM	Maserati 250F1 2.5 L6; Maserati A6 2.0 L6	P	(Spain) Paco Godia									6	—N/a^{2}	
1955	Maserati 250F	Maserati 250F1 2.5 L6	P		ARG	MON	500	BEL	NED	GBR	ITA			—N/a^{2}	
1955	Maserati 250F	Maserati 250F1 2.5 L6	P	(France) Jean Behra	6^{†}	3^{†}		5^{†}	6	Ret	4			—N/a^{2}	
1955	Maserati 250F	Maserati 250F1 2.5 L6	P	(United States) Harry Schell	6^{†}									—N/a^{2}	
1955	Maserati 250F	Maserati 250F1 2.5 L6	P	(Italy) Sergio Mantovani	7^{†}									—N/a^{2}	
1955	Maserati 250F	Maserati 250F1 2.5 L6	P	(Italy) Luigi Musso	7^{†}	Ret		7	3	5	Ret			—N/a^{2}	
1955	Maserati 250F	Maserati 250F1 2.5 L6	P	(Argentina) Roberto Mieres	5	Ret		5^{†}	4^{F}	Ret	7			—N/a^{2}	
1955	Maserati 250F	Maserati 250F1 2.5 L6	P	(Argentina) Carlos Menditéguy	Ret^{†}						5			—N/a^{2}	
1955	Maserati 250F	Maserati 250F1 2.5 L6	P	(Argentina) Clemar Bucci	Ret^{†}									—N/a^{2}	
1955	Maserati 250F	Maserati 250F1 2.5 L6	P	(Italy) Cesare Perdisa		3^{†}		8						—N/a^{2}	
1955	Maserati 250F	Maserati 250F1 2.5 L6	P	(France) André Simon						Ret				—N/a^{2}	
1955	Maserati 250F	Maserati 250F1 2.5 L6	P	(United Kingdom) Peter Collins							Ret			—N/a^{2}	
1955	Maserati 250F	Maserati 250F1 2.5 L6	P	(United Kingdom) Horace Gould							Ret			—N/a^{2}	
1956	Maserati 250F	Maserati 250F1 2.5 L6	P		ARG	MON	500	BEL	FRA	GBR	GER	ITA		—N/a^{2}	
1956	Maserati 250F	Maserati 250F1 2.5 L6	P	(France) Jean Behra	2	3		6	3	3	3	Ret^{†}		—N/a^{2}	
1956	Maserati 250F	Maserati 250F1 2.5 L6	P	(United Kingdom) Stirling Moss	Ret	1		3^{F}^{†}	5^{†}	Ret^{P}^{F}	2	1^{F}		—N/a^{2}	
1956	Maserati 250F	Maserati 250F1 2.5 L6	P	(Italy) Luigi Piotti	Ret									—N/a^{2}	
1956	Maserati 250F	Maserati 250F1 2.5 L6	P	(Italy) Gerino Gerini	4^{†}									—N/a^{2}	
1956	Maserati 250F	Maserati 250F1 2.5 L6	P	(Brazil) Chico Landi	4^{†}									—N/a^{2}	
1956	Maserati 250F	Maserati 250F1 2.5 L6	P	(Argentina) Carlos Menditéguy	Ret									—N/a^{2}	
1956	Maserati 250F	Maserati 250F1 2.5 L6	P	(Argentina) José Froilán González	Ret									—N/a^{2}	
1956	Maserati 250F	Maserati 250F1 2.5 L6	P	(Italy) Cesare Perdisa		7		3^{†}	5^{†}	7	Ret^{†}			—N/a^{2}	
1956	Maserati 250F	Maserati 250F1 2.5 L6	P	(Spain) Paco Godia				Ret	7	8	4	4		—N/a^{2}	
1956	Maserati 250F	Maserati 250F1 2.5 L6	P	(United Kingdom) Mike Hawthorn				DNS						—N/a^{2}	
1956	Maserati 250F	Maserati 250F1 2.5 L6	P	(Italy) Piero Taruffi					Ret					—N/a^{2}	
1956	Maserati 250F	Maserati 250F1 2.5 L6	P	(Italy) Umberto Maglioli							Ret^{†}	Ret^{†}		—N/a^{2}	
1956	Maserati 250F	Maserati 250F1 2.5 L6	P	(Italy) Luigi Villoresi								Ret^{†}		—N/a^{2}	
1956	Maserati 250F	Maserati 250F1 2.5 L6	P	(Sweden) Jo Bonnier								Ret^{†}		—N/a^{2}	
1957	Maserati 250F	Maserati 250F1 2.5 L6; Maserati 250F1 2.5 V12	P		ARG	MON	500	FRA	GBR	GER	PES	ITA		—N/a^{2}	
1957	Maserati 250F	Maserati 250F1 2.5 L6; Maserati 250F1 2.5 V12	P	(Argentina) Juan Manuel Fangio	1	1^{P}^{F}		1^{P}	Ret	1^{P}^{F}	2^{P}	2		—N/a^{2}	
1957	Maserati 250F	Maserati 250F1 2.5 L6; Maserati 250F1 2.5 V12	P	(France) Jean Behra	2			6	Ret	6	Ret	Ret		—N/a^{2}	
1957	Maserati 250F	Maserati 250F1 2.5 L6; Maserati 250F1 2.5 V12	P	(Argentina) Carlos Menditéguy	3	Ret		Ret	Ret					—N/a^{2}	
1957	Maserati 250F	Maserati 250F1 2.5 L6; Maserati 250F1 2.5 V12	P	(United Kingdom) Stirling Moss	8^{P}^{F}									—N/a^{2}	
1957	Maserati 250F	Maserati 250F1 2.5 L6; Maserati 250F1 2.5 V12	P	(United States) Harry Schell		Ret^{†}		5	Ret	7	3	5^{†}		—N/a^{2}	
1957	Maserati 250F	Maserati 250F1 2.5 L6; Maserati 250F1 2.5 V12	P	(Italy) Giorgio Scarlatti		Ret^{†}				10	6	5^{†}		—N/a^{2}	
1957	Maserati 250F	Maserati 250F1 2.5 L6; Maserati 250F1 2.5 V12	P	(Germany) Hans Herrmann		DNQ								—N/a^{2}	

Notes

- ^2 – The Constructors World Championship did not exist before 1958.
- † Indicates shared drive

=== Results of other Maserati cars ===
(key)

Year	Entrant/s	Chassis/	Engine	Tyres	Driver/s	1	2	3	4	5	6	7	8	9	10	11
1950	Scuderia Ambrosiana	Maserati 4CLT/48	Maserati 4CLT 1.5 L4 s	D		GBR	MON	500	SUI	BEL	FRA	ITA				
1950	Scuderia Ambrosiana	Maserati 4CLT/48	Maserati 4CLT 1.5 L4 s	D	(United Kingdom) David Murray	Ret						Ret				
1950	Scuderia Ambrosiana	Maserati 4CLT/48	Maserati 4CLT 1.5 L4 s	D	(United Kingdom) David Hampshire	9					Ret					
1950	Scuderia Ambrosiana	Maserati 4CLT/48	Maserati 4CLT 1.5 L4 s	D	(United Kingdom) Reg Parnell						Ret					
1950	Enrico Platé	Maserati 4CLT/48	Maserati 4CLT 1.5 L4 s	P	(Switzerland) Toulo de Graffenried	Ret	Ret		6			6				
1950	Enrico Platé	Maserati 4CLT/48	Maserati 4CLT 1.5 L4 s	P	(Thailand) B. Bira	Ret	5		4			Ret				
1950	Joe Fry	Maserati 4CL	Maserati 4CL 1.5 L4 s	D	(United Kingdom) Joe Fry	10†										
1950	Joe Fry	Maserati 4CL	Maserati 4CL 1.5 L4 s	D	(United Kingdom) Brian Shawe-Taylor	10†										
1950	Scuderia Achille Varzi	Maserati 4CLT/48; Maserati 4CL	Maserati 4CLT 1.5 L4 s Maserati 4CL 1.5 L4 s	P	(Argentina) José Froilán González		Ret				Ret					
1950	Scuderia Achille Varzi	Maserati 4CLT/48; Maserati 4CL	Maserati 4CLT 1.5 L4 s Maserati 4CL 1.5 L4 s	P	(Argentina) Alfredo Pián		DNS									
1950	Scuderia Achille Varzi	Maserati 4CLT/48; Maserati 4CL	Maserati 4CLT 1.5 L4 s Maserati 4CL 1.5 L4 s	P	(Italy) Nello Pagani				7							
1950	Scuderia Achille Varzi	Maserati 4CLT/48; Maserati 4CL	Maserati 4CLT 1.5 L4 s Maserati 4CL 1.5 L4 s	P	(Switzerland) Toni Branca				11							
1950	Indianapolis Race Cars	Maserati 8CTF	Maserati 3.0 L8 s	F	(United States) Bill Vukovich			DNQ								
1950	Indianapolis Race Cars	Maserati 8CL	Offenhauser 3.0 L4 s	F	(United States) Henry Banks			Ret								
1950	Fadely-Anderson/R.A. Cott	Maserati 8CTF	Offenhauser 4.5 L4	F	(United States) Spider Webb			20								
1950	Federal Engineering	Maserati 8CTF	Maserati 3.0 L8 s	F	(United States) Danny Kladis			DNQ								
1950	Coast Grain	Maserati V8RI	Offenhauser 4.5 L4	F	(United States) Manny Ayulo			DNQ								
1950	Coast Grain	Maserati V8RI	Offenhauser 4.5 L4	F	(United States) Jim Rigsby			DNQ								
1950	Scuderia Milano	Maserati 4CLT/50	Speluzzi 1.5 L4 s	P	(Italy) Felice Bonetto				5		Ret					
1950	Scuderia Milano	Maserati 4CLT/50	Speluzzi 1.5 L4 s	P	(Italy) Franco Comotti							Ret				
1950	Antonio Branca	Maserati 4CL	Maserati 4CL 1.5 L4 s	P	(Switzerland) Toni Branca					10						
1950	Paul Pietsch	Maserati 4CLT/48	Maserati 4CLT 1.5 L4 s	P	(Germany) Paul Pietsch							Ret				
1951	Enrico Platé	Maserati 4CLT/48	Maserati 4CLT 1.5 L4 s	P		SUI	500	BEL	FRA	GBR	GER	ITA	ESP			
1951	Enrico Platé	Maserati 4CLT/48	Maserati 4CLT 1.5 L4 s	P	(Monaco) Louis Chiron	7										
1951	Enrico Platé	Maserati 4CLT/48	Maserati 4CLT 1.5 L4 s	P	(United States) Harry Schell	12			Ret							
1951	Enrico Platé	Maserati 4CLT/48	Maserati 4CLT 1.5 L4 s	P	(Switzerland) Toulo de Graffenried				Ret		Ret					
1951	Enrico Platé	Maserati 4CLT/48	Maserati 4CLT 1.5 L4 s	P	(Germany) Paul Pietsch						DNS					
1951	W.J. / Maserati Race Cars	Maserati 8CTF	Offenhauser 3.0 L4 s	F	(United States) Johnny McDowell		Ret									
1951	Joe Barzda	Maserati 8CTF	Offenhauser 4.5 L4	F	(United States) Joe Barzda		DNQ									
1951	Auto Accessories/Joe Barzda	Maserati 8CTF	Maserati 3.0 L8 s	F	(United States) Bud Sennet		DNQ									
1951	Scuderia Milano	Maserati 4CLT/50	Speluzzi 1.5 L4 s	P	(Argentina) Onofre Marimón				Ret							
1951	Scuderia Milano	Maserati 4CLT/50	Speluzzi 1.5 L4 s	P	(Spain) Paco Godia								10			
1951	Scuderia Milano	Maserati 4CLT/50	Speluzzi 1.5 L4 s	P	(Spain) Juan Jover								DNS			
1951	Scuderia Ambrosiana	Maserati 4CLT/48	Maserati 4CLT 1.5 L4 s	D	(United Kingdom) David Murray					Ret	DNS					
1951	John James	Maserati 4CLT/48	Maserati 4CLT 1.5 L4 s	D	(United Kingdom) John James					Ret						
1951	Philip Fotheringham-Parker	Maserati 4CL	Maserati 4CL 1.5 L4 s	D	(United Kingdom) Philip Fotheringham-Parker					Ret						
1951	Antonio Branca	Maserati 4CLT/48	Maserati 4CLT 1.5 L4 s	P	(Switzerland) Toni Branca						Ret					
1951	Prince Bira	Maserati 4CLT/48	OSCA 4500 4.5 V12	P	(Thailand) B. Bira								Ret			
1952	Enrico Platé	Maserati 4CLT/48	Platé 2.0 L4	P		SUI	500	BEL	FRA	GBR	GER	NED	ITA			
1952	Enrico Platé	Maserati 4CLT/48	Platé 2.0 L4	P	(Switzerland) Toulo de Graffenried	6			Ret†	19			DNQ			
1952	Enrico Platé	Maserati 4CLT/48	Platé 2.0 L4	P	(United States) Harry Schell	Ret			Ret†	17						
1952	Enrico Platé	Maserati 4CLT/48	Platé 2.0 L4	P	(Argentina) Alberto Crespo								DNQ			
1952	Fadely-Anderson/R.A. Cott	Maserati 4CLT/48	Offenhauser 4.5 L4	F	(United States) Carl Forberg		DNQ									
1952	Speed International	Maserati 8CTF	Offenhauser 3.0 L4 s	F	(United States) Jackie Holmes		DNQ									
1952	California Speed	Maserati 8CTF	Offenhauser 4.5 L4	F	(United States) Joe Barzda		DNQ									
1952	Escuderia Bandeirantes	Maserati A6GCM	Maserati A6 2.0 L6	P	(France) Philippe Étancelin				8							
1952	Escuderia Bandeirantes	Maserati A6GCM	Maserati A6 2.0 L6	P	(Brazil) Gino Bianco					18	Ret	Ret	Ret			
1952	Escuderia Bandeirantes	Maserati A6GCM	Maserati A6 2.0 L6	P	(Uruguay) Eitel Cantoni					Ret	Ret		11			
1952	Escuderia Bandeirantes	Maserati A6GCM	Maserati A6 2.0 L6	P	(Brazil) Chico Landi							9†	8			
1952	Escuderia Bandeirantes	Maserati A6GCM	Maserati A6 2.0 L6	P	(Netherlands) Jan Flinterman							9†				
1953	Robert J McManus	Maserati 8CL	Maserati 3.0 L8 s	F		ARG	500	NED	BEL	FRA	GBR	GER	SUI	ITA		
1953	Robert J McManus	Maserati 8CL	Maserati 3.0 L8 s	F	(United States) Roy Newman		DNQ									
1953	California Speed	Maserati 8CTF	Maserati 3.0 L8 s	F	(United States) Joe Barzda		DNQ									
1953	Fadely-Anderson/R.A. Cott	Maserati 4CLT/48	Offenhauser 4.5 L4	F	(United States) Spider Webb		DNQ									
1953	Enrico Platé	Maserati A6GCM	Maserati A6 2.0 L6	P	(Switzerland) Toulo de Graffenried			5								
1953	Emmanuel de Graffenried	Maserati A6GCM	Maserati A6 2.0 L6	P	(Switzerland) Toulo de Graffenried				4	7	Ret	5	Ret	Ret		
1953	Escuderia Bandeirantes	Maserati A6GCM	Maserati A6 2.0 L6	P	(Brazil) Chico Landi								Ret			
1953	Scuderia Milano	Maserati A6GCM	Maserati A6 2.0 L6	P	(Brazil) Chico Landi									Ret		
1953	Scuderia Milano	Maserati A6GCM	Maserati A6 2.0 L6	P	(Thailand) B. Bira									11		
1954	Harry Schell	Maserati A6GCM; Maserati 250F	Maserati A6 2.0 L6; Maserati 250F1 2.5 L6	P		ARG	500	BEL	FRA	GBR	GER	SUI	ITA	ESP		
1954	Harry Schell	Maserati A6GCM; Maserati 250F	Maserati A6 2.0 L6; Maserati 250F1 2.5 L6	P	(United States) Harry Schell	6			Ret	12	7			Ret		
1954	Emmanuel de Graffenried	Maserati A6GCM	Maserati A6 2.0 L6	P	(Switzerland) Toulo de Graffenried	8								Ret†		
1954	Emmanuel de Graffenried	Maserati A6GCM	Maserati A6 2.0 L6	P	(Switzerland) Ottorino Volonterio									Ret†		
1954	Roberto Mieres	Maserati A6GCM; Maserati 250F	Maserati A6 2.0 L6; Maserati 250F1 2.5 L6	P	(Argentina) Roberto Mieres	Ret		Ret	Ret	6	Ret					
1954	Jorge Daponte	Maserati A6GCM	Maserati A6 2.0 L6	P	(Argentina) Jorge Daponte	Ret							11			
1954	Onofre Marimón	Maserati A6GCM	Maserati A6 2.0 L6	P	(Argentina) Carlos Menditeguy	DNS										
1954	Prince Bira	Maserati 250F	Maserati 250F1 2.5 L6	P	(Thailand) Prince Bira			6	4	Ret†	Ret			9		
1954	Prince Bira	Maserati 250F	Maserati 250F1 2.5 L6	P	(United Kingdom) Ron Flockhart					Ret†						
1954	Equipe Moss	Maserati 250F	Maserati 250F1 2.5 L6	P	(United Kingdom) Stirling Moss			3		Ret^{F}	Ret					
1954	Owen Racing Organisation	Maserati 250F	Maserati 250F1 2.5 L6	D	(United Kingdom) Ken Wharton				Ret	8	DNS	6		8		
1954	Gilby Engineering	Maserati 250F	Maserati 250F1 2.5 L6	P	(United Kingdom) Roy Salvadori				Ret	Ret						
1954	Giovanni de Riu	Maserati A6GCM	Maserati A6 2.0 L6	P	(Italy) Giovanni de Riu								DNQ			
1954	Ecurie Rosier	Maserati 250F	Maserati 250F1 2.5 L6	P	(France) Louis Rosier									7		
1955	Alberto Uría	Maserati A6GCM	Maserati 250F1 2.5 L6	P		ARG	MON	500	BEL	NED	GBR	ITA				
1955	Alberto Uría	Maserati A6GCM	Maserati 250F1 2.5 L6	P	(Uruguay) Alberto Uría	Ret										
1955	Ecurie Rosier	Maserati 250F	Maserati 250F1 2.5 L6	P	(France) Louis Rosier		Ret		9	9						
1955	Stirling Moss Ltd	Maserati 250F	Maserati 250F1 2.5 L6	D	(United Kingdom) Lance Macklin		DNQ				8					
1955	Stirling Moss Ltd	Maserati 250F	Maserati 250F1 2.5 L6	D	(Belgium) Johnny Claes				DNS							
1955	Stirling Moss Ltd	Maserati 250F	Maserati 250F1 2.5 L6	D	(United Kingdom) Peter Walker					Ret						
1955	Stirling Moss Ltd	Maserati 250F	Maserati 250F1 2.5 L6	D	(United States) John Fitch							9				
1955	Gould's Garage	Maserati 250F	Maserati 250F1 2.5 L6	D	(United Kingdom) Horace Gould					Ret	Ret					
1955	Owen Racing Organisation	Maserati 250F	Maserati 250F1 2.5 L6	D	(United Kingdom) Peter Collins						Ret					
1955	Gilby Engineering	Maserati 250F	Maserati 250F1 2.5 L6	D	(United Kingdom) Roy Salvadori						Ret					
1956	Owen Racing Organisation	Maserati 250F	Maserati 250F1 2.5 L6	P		ARG	MON	500	BEL	FRA	GBR	GER	ITA			
1956	Owen Racing Organisation	Maserati 250F	Maserati 250F1 2.5 L6	P	(United Kingdom) Mike Hawthorn	3										
1956	Alberto Uría	Maserati A6GCM	Maserati 250F1 2.5 L6	P	(Uruguay) Alberto Uría	6†										
1956	Alberto Uría	Maserati A6GCM	Maserati 250F1 2.5 L6	P	(Uruguay) Óscar González	6†										
1956	Ecurie Rosier	Maserati 250F	Maserati 250F1 2.5 L6	P	(France) Louis Rosier		Ret		8	6	Ret	5				
1956	Gould's Garage	Maserati 250F	Maserati 250F1 2.5 L6	D	(United Kingdom) Horace Gould		8		Ret		5	Ret				
1956	Scuderia Centro Sud	Maserati 250F	Maserati 250F1 2.5 L6	P	(Italy) Luigi Villoresi				5							
1956	Scuderia Centro Sud	Maserati 250F	Maserati 250F1 2.5 L6	P	(United States) Harry Schell							Ret				
1956	Scuderia Centro Sud	Maserati 250F	Maserati 250F1 2.5 L6	P	(Switzerland) Toulo de Graffenried								7			
1956	Luigi Piotti	Maserati 250F	Maserati 250F1 2.5 L6	P	(Italy) Luigi Villoresi					Ret	6	Ret				
1956	Luigi Piotti	Maserati 250F	Maserati 250F1 2.5 L6	P	(Italy) Luigi Piotti							DNS	6			
1956	André Simon	Maserati 250F	Maserati 250F1 2.5 L6	P	(France) André Simon					Ret						
1956	Scuderia Guastalla	Maserati 250F	Maserati 250F1 2.5 L6	P	(Italy) Umberto Maglioli						Ret					
1956	Scuderia Guastalla	Maserati 250F	Maserati 250F1 2.5 L6	P	(Italy) Gerino Gerini								10			
1956	Gilby Engineering	Maserati 250F	Maserati 250F1 2.5 L6	D	(United Kingdom) Roy Salvadori						Ret	Ret	11			
1956	Bruce Halford	Maserati 250F	Maserati 250F1 2.5 L6	D	(United Kingdom) Bruce Halford						Ret	DSQ	Ret			
1956	Jack Brabham	Maserati 250F	Maserati 250F1 2.5 L6	D	(Australia) Jack Brabham						Ret					
1956	Ottorino Volonterio	Maserati A6GCM	Maserati 250F1 2.5 L6	P	(Switzerland) Ottorino Volonterio							NC				
1957	Scuderia Centro Sud	Maserati 250F	Maserati 250F1 2.5 L6	P		ARG	MON	500	FRA	GBR	GER	PES	ITA			
1957	Scuderia Centro Sud	Maserati 250F	Maserati 250F1 2.5 L6	P	(United States) Harry Schell	4										
1957	Scuderia Centro Sud	Maserati 250F	Maserati 250F1 2.5 L6	P	(Sweden) Joakim Bonnier	7						Ret	Ret			
1957	Scuderia Centro Sud	Maserati 250F	Maserati 250F1 2.5 L6	P	(United States) Masten Gregory		3				8	4	4			
1957	Scuderia Centro Sud	Maserati 250F	Maserati 250F1 2.5 L6	P	(Germany) Hans Herrmann						Ret					
1957	Scuderia Centro Sud	Maserati 250F	Maserati 250F1 2.5 L6	P	(France) André Simon		DNQ									
1957	Luigi Piotti	Maserati 250F	Maserati 250F1 2.5 L6	P	(Italy) Luigi Piotti	10	DNQ					Ret	Ret			
1957	H.H. Gould	Maserati 250F	Maserati 250F1 2.5 L6	D	(United Kingdom) Horace Gould		Ret		Ret	DNS	Ret	Ret	10			
1957	Morgan Engineering	Maserati 4CLT/48	Maserati 4CLT 1.5 L4 s	F	(United States) Danny Kladis			DNQ								
1957	Jo Bonnier	Maserati 250F	Maserati 250F1 2.5 L6	P	(Sweden) Joakim Bonnier					Ret						
1957	Gilby Engineering	Maserati 250F	Maserati 250F1 2.5 L6	D	(United Kingdom) Ivor Bueb					8						
1957	Bruce Halford	Maserati 250F	Maserati 250F1 2.5 L6	D	(United Kingdom) Bruce Halford						11	Ret	Ret			
1957	Francesco Godia Sales	Maserati 250F	Maserati 250F1 2.5 L6	P	(Spain) Paco Godia								9			
1957	Ottorino Volonterio	Maserati 250F	Maserati 250F1 2.5 L6	P	(Switzerland) Ottorino Volonterio								11†			
1957	Ottorino Volonterio	Maserati 250F	Maserati 250F1 2.5 L6	P	(France) André Simon								11†			
1958	Scuderia Sud Americana	Maserati 250F	Maserati 250F1 2.5 L6	P		ARG	MON	NED	500	BEL	FRA	GBR	GER	POR	ITA	MOR
1958	Scuderia Sud Americana	Maserati 250F	Maserati 250F1 2.5 L6	P	(Argentina) Carlos Menditeguy	7										
1958	Scuderia Sud Americana	Maserati 250F	Maserati 250F1 2.5 L6	P	(Argentina) Juan Manuel Fangio	4^{P}^{F}										
1958	Ken Kavanagh	Maserati 250F	Maserati 250F1 2.5 L6	P	(France) Jean Behra	5										
1958	Ken Kavanagh	Maserati 250F	Maserati 250F1 2.5 L6	P	(Italy) Luigi Taramazzo		DNQ									
1958	Ken Kavanagh	Maserati 250F	Maserati 250F1 2.5 L6	P	(Australia) Ken Kavanagh		DNQ			DNS						
1958	Jo Bonnier	Maserati 250F	Maserati 250F1 2.5 L6	P	(United States) Harry Schell	6										
1958	Jo Bonnier	Maserati 250F	Maserati 250F1 2.5 L6	P	(Sweden) Joakim Bonnier		Ret	10		9		Ret		Ret		
1958	Jo Bonnier	Maserati 250F	Maserati 250F1 2.5 L6	P	(United States) Phil Hill						7					
1958	Jo Bonnier	Maserati 250F	Maserati 250F1 2.5 L6	P	(Italy) Giulio Cabianca										Ret	
1958	Jo Bonnier	Maserati 250F	Maserati 250F1 2.5 L6	P	(Germany) Hans Herrmann										Ret	9
1958	Francesco Godia Sales	Maserati 250F	Maserati 250F1 2.5 L6	P	(Spain) Paco Godia	8	DNQ			Ret	Ret					
1958	H.H. Gould	Maserati 250F	Maserati 250F1 2.5 L6	D	(United Kingdom) Horace Gould	9	DNQ	DNS								
1958	H.H. Gould	Maserati 250F	Maserati 250F1 2.5 L6	D	(United States) Masten Gregory			Ret								
1958	Giorgio Scarlatti	Maserati 250F	Maserati 250F1 2.5 L6	P	(Italy) Giorgio Scarlatti		Ret	Ret								
1958	Giorgio Scarlatti	Maserati 250F	Maserati 250F1 2.5 L6	P	(Sweden) Joakim Bonnier						8					
1958	Scuderia Centro Sud	Maserati 250F	Maserati 250F1 2.5 L6	P	(Italy) Gerino Gerini		DNQ				9	Ret			Ret	12
1958	Scuderia Centro Sud	Maserati 250F	Maserati 250F1 2.5 L6	P	(France) Maurice Trintignant					7						
1958	Scuderia Centro Sud	Maserati 250F	Maserati 250F1 2.5 L6	P	(United States) Masten Gregory					Ret						
1958	Scuderia Centro Sud	Maserati 250F	Maserati 250F1 2.5 L6	P	(Germany) Wolfgang Seidel					Ret						Ret
1958	Scuderia Centro Sud	Maserati 250F	Maserati 250F1 2.5 L6	P	(United States) Carroll Shelby						Ret	9			Ret	
1958	Scuderia Centro Sud	Maserati 250F	Maserati 250F1 2.5 L6	P	(United States) Troy Ruttman						10		DNS			
1958	Scuderia Centro Sud	Maserati 250F	Maserati 250F1 2.5 L6	P	(Germany) Hans Herrmann								Ret			
1958	Scuderia Centro Sud	Maserati 250F	Maserati 250F1 2.5 L6	P	(Sweden) Joakim Bonnier								Ret			
1958	Scuderia Centro Sud	Maserati 250F	Maserati 250F1 2.5 L6	P	(United Kingdom) Cliff Allison									Ret		
1958	Scuderia Centro Sud	Maserati 250F	Maserati 250F1 2.5 L6	P	(Italy) Maria Teresa de Filippis									Ret		
1958	Maria Teresa de Filippis	Maserati 250F	Maserati 250F1 2.5 L6	P	(Italy) Maria Teresa de Filippis		DNQ			10					Ret	
1958	André Testut	Maserati 250F	Maserati 250F1 2.5 L6	P	(Monaco) André Testut		DNQ									
1958	André Testut	Maserati 250F	Maserati 250F1 2.5 L6	P	(Monaco) Louis Chiron		DNQ									
1958	Juan Manuel Fangio	Maserati 250F	Maserati 250F1 2.5 L6	P	(Argentina) Juan Manuel Fangio						4					
1958	Temple Buell	Maserati 250F	Maserati 250F1 2.5 L6	P	(United States) Carroll Shelby									9	4†	
1958	Temple Buell	Maserati 250F	Maserati 250F1 2.5 L6	P	(United States) Masten Gregory										4†	6
1959	Scuderia Ugolini	Maserati 250F	Maserati 250F1 2.5 L6	D		MON	500	NED	FRA	GBR	GER	POR	ITA	USA		
1959	Scuderia Ugolini	Maserati 250F	Maserati 250F1 2.5 L6	D	(Italy) Giorgio Scarlatti	DNQ			8							
1959	Scuderia Ugolini	Maserati 250F	Maserati 250F1 2.5 L6	D	(Netherlands) Carel Godin de Beaufort				9							
1959	Monte Carlo Auto Sport	Maserati 250F	Maserati 250F1 2.5 L6	D	(Monaco) André Testut	DNQ										
1959	Eldorado Italia	Maserati 420M/58	Maserati 4.2 V8	F	(United States) Ralph Liguori		DNQ									
1959	Scuderia Centro Sud	Maserati 250F	Maserati 250F1 2.5 L6	D	(Uruguay) Asdrúbal Fontes Bayardo				DNQ							
1959	Scuderia Centro Sud	Maserati 250F	Maserati 250F1 2.5 L6	D	(Brazil) Fritz d'Orey				10	Ret						
1959	Ottorino Volonterio	Maserati 250F	Maserati 250F1 2.5 L6	D	(Italy) Giulio Cabianca								15			
1959	Phil Cade	Maserati 250F	Maserati 250F1 2.5 L6	D	(United States) Phil Cade									DNS		
1960	Giorgio Scarlatti	Maserati 250F	Maserati 250F1 2.5 L6	D		ARG	MON	500	NED	BEL	FRA	GBR	POR	ITA	USA	
1960	Giorgio Scarlatti	Maserati 250F	Maserati 250F1 2.5 L6	D	(Italy) Giorgio Scarlatti	Ret										
1960	Nasif Estéfano	Maserati 250F	Maserati 250F1 2.5 L6	D	(Argentina) Nasif Estéfano	14										
1960	Antonio Creus	Maserati 250F	Maserati 250F1 2.5 L6	D	(Spain) Antonio Creus	Ret										
1960	Gino Munaron	Maserati 250F	Maserati 250F1 2.5 L6	D	(Italy) Gino Munaron	13										
1960	Ettore Chimeri	Maserati 250F	Maserati 250F1 2.5 L6	D	(Venezuela) Ettore Chimeri	Ret										
1960	H.H. Gould	Maserati 250F	Maserati 250F1 2.5 L6	D	(United Kingdom) Horace Gould									DNS		
1960	Joe Lubin	Maserati 250F	Maserati 250F1 2.5 L6	D	(United States) Bob Drake										13	

† Indicates shared drive

=== As an engine supplier ===
(key)

Year	Entrant	Chassis	Engine	Tyres	Drivers	1	2	3	4	5	6	7	8	9	10	11	12	WCC	Points
1955	Scuderia Volpini	Arzani-Volpini F1	Maserati 4CLT 2.5 L4	P		ARG	MON	500	BEL	NED	GBR	ITA						—N/a^{1}	
1955	Scuderia Volpini	Arzani-Volpini F1	Maserati 4CLT 2.5 L4	P	(Italy) Luigi Piotti							DNS						—N/a^{1}	
1956 – 1958: Maserati did not supply engines to other teams.
1959	High Efficiency Motors	Cooper T45	Maserati 250S 2.5 L4	D		MON	500	NED	FRA	GBR	GER	POR	ITA	USA				NC	0
1959	High Efficiency Motors	Cooper T45	Maserati 250S 2.5 L4	D	(United Kingdom) Roy Salvadori	6			Ret					Ret				NC	0
1959	High Efficiency Motors	Cooper T45	Maserati 250S 2.5 L4	D	(United Kingdom) Jack Fairman								Ret					NC	0
1959	Scuderia Centro Sud	Cooper T51	Maserati 250S 2.5 L4	D	(United Kingdom) Ian Burgess				Ret	Ret	6		14					NC	0
1959	Scuderia Centro Sud	Cooper T51	Maserati 250S 2.5 L4	D	(United Kingdom) Colin Davis				Ret				11					NC	0
1959	Scuderia Centro Sud	Cooper T51	Maserati 250S 2.5 L4	D	(Germany) Hans Herrmann					Ret								NC	0
1959	Scuderia Centro Sud	Cooper T51	Maserati 250S 2.5 L4	D	(Portugal) Mário de Araújo Cabral							10						NC	0
1959	Frank Arciero	Kurtis Kraft 500C	Maserati 4.2 V8	F	(United States) Shorty Templeman		DNQ											—N/a^{2}	
1959	J.B. Naylor	JBW 59	Maserati 250S 2.5 L4	D	(United Kingdom) Brian Naylor					Ret								NC	0
1959	Camoradi USA	Tec-Mec F415	Maserati 250F1 2.5 L6	D	(Brazil) Fritz d'Orey									Ret				NC	0
1960	Scuderia Centro Sud	Cooper T51	Maserati 250S 2.5 L4	D		ARG	MON	500	NED	BEL	FRA	GBR	POR	ITA	USA			5th	3
1960	Scuderia Centro Sud	Cooper T51	Maserati 250S 2.5 L4	D	(Argentina) Carlos Menditeguy	4												5th	3
1960	Scuderia Centro Sud	Cooper T51	Maserati 250S 2.5 L4	D	(Argentina) Roberto Bonomi	11												5th	3
1960	Scuderia Centro Sud	Cooper T51	Maserati 250S 2.5 L4	D	(United States) Masten Gregory		DNQ		DNS		9	14	Ret					5th	3
1960	Scuderia Centro Sud	Cooper T51	Maserati 250S 2.5 L4	D	(United Kingdom) Ian Burgess		DNQ				10	Ret			Ret			5th	3
1960	Scuderia Centro Sud	Cooper T51	Maserati 250S 2.5 L4	D	(France) Maurice Trintignant		Ret		Ret		Ret				15			5th	3
1960	Scuderia Centro Sud	Cooper T51	Maserati 250S 2.5 L4	D	(Portugal) Mário de Araújo Cabral								Ret					5th	3
1960	Scuderia Centro Sud	Cooper T51	Maserati 250S 2.5 L4	D	(United States) Alfonso Thiele									Ret				5th	3
1960	Scuderia Centro Sud	Cooper T51	Maserati 250S 2.5 L4	D	(Germany) Wolfgang von Trips										9			5th	3
1960	Gilby Engineering	Cooper T45	Maserati 250S 2.5 L4	D	(United Kingdom) Keith Greene							Ret						5th	3
1960	J.B. Naylor	JBW 59	Maserati 250S 2.5 L4	D	(United Kingdom) Brian Naylor		DNQ					13		Ret	Ret			NC	0
1961	Equipe Nationale Belge	Emeryson 61	Maserati Tipo 6 1.5 L4	D		MON	NED	BEL	FRA	GBR	GER	ITA	USA					NC	0
1961	Equipe Nationale Belge	Emeryson 61	Maserati Tipo 6 1.5 L4	D	(Belgium) Lucien Bianchi	DNQ												NC	0
1961	Equipe Nationale Belge	Emeryson 61	Maserati Tipo 6 1.5 L4	D	(Belgium) Olivier Gendebien	DNQ												NC	0
1961	Scuderia Serenissima	Cooper T51	Maserati Tipo 6 1.5 L4	D	(France) Maurice Trintignant	7		Ret	13		Ret	9						NC	0
1961	Scuderia Centro Sud	Cooper T51; Cooper T53	Maserati Tipo 6 1.5 L4	D	(Italy) Lorenzo Bandini			Ret		12	Ret	8						NC	0
1961	Scuderia Centro Sud	Cooper T51; Cooper T53	Maserati Tipo 6 1.5 L4	D	(Italy) Massimo Natili					Ret		DNS						NC	0
1961	Pescara Racing Team	Cooper T45	Maserati Tipo 6 1.5 L4	D	(Italy) Renato Pirocchi							12						NC	0
1961	Gaetano Starrabba	Lotus 18	Maserati Tipo 6 1.5 L4	D	(Italy) Gaetano Starrabba							Ret						NC	0
1962	Equipe National Belge	ENB F1	Maserati Tipo 6 1.5 L4	D		NED	MON	BEL	FRA	GBR	GER	ITA	USA	RSA				NC	0
1962	Equipe National Belge	ENB F1	Maserati Tipo 6 1.5 L4	D	(Belgium) Lucien Bianchi						16							NC	0
1963	Scuderia Centro Sud	Cooper T53	Maserati Tipo 6 1.5 L4	D		MON	BEL	NED	FRA	GBR	GER	ITA	USA	MEX	RSA			NC	0
1963	Scuderia Centro Sud	Cooper T53	Maserati Tipo 6 1.5 L4	D	(Italy) Ernesto Brambilla							DNQ						NC	0
1963	Scuderia Lupini	Cooper T51	Maserati Tipo 6 1.5 L4	D	(South Africa) Trevor Blokdyk										12			NC	0
1964 – 1965: Maserati did not supply engines to other teams.
1966	Cooper Car Company	Cooper T81	Maserati 9/F1 3.0 V12	D		MON	BEL	FRA	GBR	NED	GER	ITA	USA	MEX				3rd	30 (35)
1966	Cooper Car Company	Cooper T81	Maserati 9/F1 3.0 V12	D	(Austria) Jochen Rindt	Ret	2	4	5	Ret	3	4	2	Ret				3rd	30 (35)
1966	Cooper Car Company	Cooper T81	Maserati 9/F1 3.0 V12	D	(United States) Richie Ginther	Ret	5											3rd	30 (35)
1966	Cooper Car Company	Cooper T81	Maserati 9/F1 3.0 V12	D	(United Kingdom) John Surtees			Ret	Ret	Ret	2^{F}	Ret	3^{F}	1^{P}				3rd	30 (35)
1966	Cooper Car Company	Cooper T81	Maserati 9/F1 3.0 V12	D	(New Zealand) Chris Amon			8										3rd	30 (35)
1966	Cooper Car Company	Cooper T81	Maserati 9/F1 3.0 V12	D	(Mexico) Moisés Solana									Ret				3rd	30 (35)
1966	R.R.C. Walker Racing Team	Cooper T81	Maserati 9/F1 3.0 V12	D	(Switzerland) Jo Siffert		Ret	Ret	NC	Ret		Ret	4	Ret				3rd	30 (35)
1966	Anglo-Suisse Racing Team	Cooper T81	Maserati 9/F1 3.0 V12	F	(Sweden) Joakim Bonnier	NC	Ret			7	Ret	Ret	NC	6				3rd	30 (35)
1966	Guy Ligier	Cooper T81	Maserati 9/F1 3.0 V12	D	(France) Guy Ligier	NC	NC	NC	10	9	DNS							3rd	30 (35)
1967	Cooper Car Company	Cooper T81; Cooper T81B; Cooper T86	Maserati 9/F1 3.0 V12; Maserati 10/F1 3.0 V12	F		RSA	MON	NED	BEL	FRA	GBR	GER	CAN	ITA	USA	MEX		3rd	28
1967	Cooper Car Company	Cooper T81; Cooper T81B; Cooper T86	Maserati 9/F1 3.0 V12; Maserati 10/F1 3.0 V12	F	(Austria) Jochen Rindt	Ret	Ret	Ret	4	Ret	Ret	Ret	Ret	4	Ret			3rd	28
1967	Cooper Car Company	Cooper T81; Cooper T81B; Cooper T86	Maserati 9/F1 3.0 V12; Maserati 10/F1 3.0 V12	F	(Mexico) Pedro Rodríguez	1	5	Ret	9	6	5	8				6		3rd	28
1967	Cooper Car Company	Cooper T81; Cooper T81B; Cooper T86	Maserati 9/F1 3.0 V12; Maserati 10/F1 3.0 V12	F	(United Kingdom) Alan Rees						9							3rd	28
1967	Cooper Car Company	Cooper T81; Cooper T81B; Cooper T86	Maserati 9/F1 3.0 V12; Maserati 10/F1 3.0 V12	F	(United Kingdom) Richard Attwood								10					3rd	28
1967	Cooper Car Company	Cooper T81; Cooper T81B; Cooper T86	Maserati 9/F1 3.0 V12; Maserati 10/F1 3.0 V12	F	(Belgium) Jacky Ickx									6	Ret			3rd	28
1967	Rob Walker/Jack Durlacher Racing Team	Cooper T81	Maserati 9/F1 3.0 V12	F	(Switzerland) Jo Siffert	Ret	Ret	10	7	4	Ret	Ret	DNS	Ret	4	12		3rd	28
1967	Joakim Bonnier Racing Team	Cooper T81	Maserati 9/F1 3.0 V12	F	(Sweden) Joakim Bonnier	Ret			Ret		Ret	6	8	Ret	6	10		3rd	28
1967	Guy Ligier	Cooper T81	Maserati 9/F1 3.0 V12	F	(France) Guy Ligier				10	NC								3rd	28
1968	Cooper Car Company	Cooper T81B; Cooper T86	Maserati 10/F1 3.0 V12	F		RSA	ESP	MON	BEL	NED	FRA	GBR	GER	ITA	CAN	USA	MEX	NC	0
1968	Cooper Car Company	Cooper T81B; Cooper T86	Maserati 10/F1 3.0 V12	F	(United Kingdom) Brian Redman	Ret												NC	0
1968	Cooper Car Company	Cooper T81B; Cooper T86	Maserati 10/F1 3.0 V12	F	(Italy) Ludovico Scarfiotti	Ret												NC	0
1968	Rob Walker/Jack Durlacher Racing Team	Cooper T81	Maserati 9/F1 3.0 V12	F	(Switzerland) Jo Siffert	7												NC	0
1968	Joakim Bonnier Racing Team	Cooper T81	Maserati 9/F1 3.0 V12	F	(Sweden) Joakim Bonnier	Ret												NC	0
1969	Antique Automobiles	Cooper T86	Maserati 10/F1 3.0 V12	G		RSA	ESP	MON	NED	FRA	GBR	GER	ITA	CAN	USA	MEX		NC	0
1969	Antique Automobiles	Cooper T86	Maserati 10/F1 3.0 V12	G	(United Kingdom) Vic Elford			7										NC	0

- ^{1} – The Constructors World Championship did not exist before 1958.
- ^{2} – Ineligible for Constructors World Championship points.
