= Dioscoride Lanza =

Italian racing driver (1898–1977)

- Born: 24 April 1898 Piossasco, Piedmont, Italy
- Died: 28 October 1977 (aged 79) Turin, Piedmont, Italy

Dioscoride Lanza (24 April 1898 – 28 October 1977) was an Italian racing driver. He entered 30 races between 1936 and 1955 – of which he started 24 – most of them in a Maserati. He submitted an entry in advance of the 1946 Indianapolis 500, but failed to appear for the event. His best result was a fourth place at the Coppa Ciano Junior.

== Motorsports career results ==
Year	Date	Race	Entrant	Car	Teammate(s)	Result
1936	August 2	X Coppa Ciano	Luigi Platé	Talbot	Luigi Platé	DNS
1938	April 10	Pau Grand Prix	D. Lanza	Maserati 6CM	none	6th
1938	May 22	XXIX Targa Florio	Scuderia Subauda	Maserati 4CM	Edoardo Teagno; Ettore Bianco	DNF
1938	June 12	XIV Picardy Grand Prix	Scuderia Subauda	Maserati 6CM	Ettore Bianco; Luigi Soffietti	5th
1938	June 26	IV Coppa Principessa di Piemonte	Scuderia Subauda	Maserati 6CM	Edoardo Teagno; Luigi Soffietti	7th
1938	July 10	Grand Prix de l'Albigeois	Scuderia Subauda	Maserati 4CM	Ettore Bianco; Edoardo Teagno	DNA
1938	July 17	Circuito Varese	Scuderia Subauda	Maserati 4CM	Ettore Bianco; Edoardo Teagno	DNF
1938	August 21	V Prix de Berne	Scuderia Torino	Maserati 6CM	Pietro Ghersi	DNA
1938	September 18	Circuito di Modena	Scuderia Subauda	Maserati 6CM	Edoardo Teagno	DNF
1939	May 7	XIII Tripoli Grand Prix	Scuderia Subauda	Maserati 6CM	none	8th
1939	May 14	XXX Targa Florio	Scuderia Subauda	Maserati 6CM	none	DNF
1939	July 30	XIX Coppa Ciano Junior	Scuderia Torino	Maserati 6CM	Roberto Bonomi; Pino Baruffi; Giorgio Pelassa; Andrea Brezzi	4th
1939	August 13	XV Coppa Acerbo Junior	Scuderia Torino	Maserati 6CM	Gianfranco Comotti; Giorgio Pelassa; Edoardo Teagno; Andrea Brezzi	DNF
1940	May 12	XIV Tripoli Grand Prix	Scuderia Torino	Maserati	Andrea Brezzi; Piero Taruffi; Alberto Ascari; Renato Balestrero; Edoardo Teagno	DNS
1946	April 22	1946 Nice Grand Prix	Private	Maserati 4CL	none	DNS
1946	May 13	1946 Marseille Grand Prix	Private	Maserati 6CM	none	DNQ
1946	June 9	Coupe René le Bègue	Private	Maserati 4CL	Maurice Trintignant	10th
1946	September 1	1946 Gran Premio del Valentino	Ecurie Naphtra Course	Maserati 4CM	Raph	9th
1947	June 22	Mille Miglia		Alfa Romeo 6C 2500 SS	Giorgio Pelassa	DNF
1947	July 20	Coppa d' Oro delle Dolomiti		Alfa Romeo 6C 2500 Tipo 256	none	DNF
1948	May 2	Mille Miglia		Fiat Leone 1100 Sport	Vincenzo Leone	DNF
1948	September 5	1948 Italian Grand Prix	Scuderia Dimiex	Maserati 4CL	none	DNQ
1949	April 3	1949 San Remo Grand Prix	Scuderia Dimiex	Maserati 4CL	Eugène Chaboud	DNF
1949	April 24	Mille Miglia		Delahaye	"Depoit"	DNF
1950	April 23	Mille Miglia		Fiat 1100	"F. Meynardi"	76th
1952		Coppa Sant Ambroeus		Moretti 750	none	6th
1953	April 26	Mille Miglia		Moretti 750	Rinaldo Pravettoni	DNF
1953	May 31	Coppa della Toscana		Moretti	none	105th
1954	May 2	Mille Miglia		Fiat 500	Giorgio Cecchini "Cordiali"; Ugo Puma	DNS
1955	May 1	Mille Miglia		Moretti 750S	Gianni Balzarini	145th
