= Ettore Bianco =

Italian racing driver

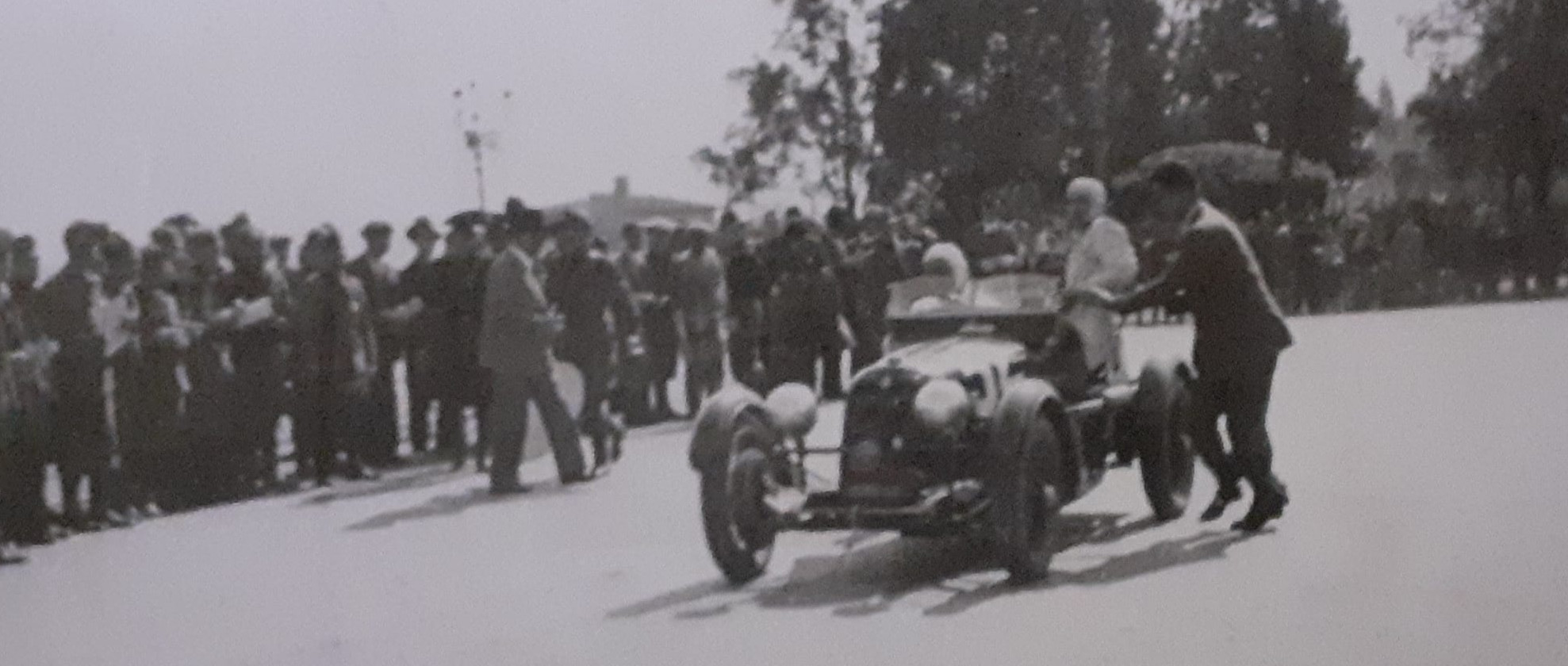
Ettore Bianco and M. Boccali's Maserati 4CS 1100 at 1936 Mille Miglia

Ettore Bianco is a former Italian racing driver. He entered 48 races between 1934 and 1952 in Fiat's and Maserati's, he started 37 of them. In 1937 he was a works driver for Officine Alfieri Maserati. Among his best results were three second places and four third places.

== Complete results ==
No.	Year	Date	Race	Entrant	Car	Teammate(s)	Result
1	1934	April 8	Mille Miglia	-	Fiat Siata 508S	"A. Mignanego"	18th
2	1935	April 14	Mille Miglia	-	Maserati 4CS	Guerino Bertocchi	7th
3	1935	August 15	XI Coppa Acerbo Junior	Ettore Bianco	Maserati 4CM	none	2nd
4	1935	September 15	IV Circuito di Modena Junior	Ettore Bianco	Maserati 4CM	none	DNF
5	1935	September 29	VI Velká Cena Masarykova	Ettore Bianco	Maserati 4CM	none	DNF
6	1935	October 6	IX Coppa della Sila	Ettore Bianco	Maserati 4CM	none	3rd
7	1936	April 5	Mille Miglia	-	Maserati 4CS	"M. Boccali"	6th
8	1936	April 11	I Coupe de Prince Rainier	-	Maserati 4CM	-	DNF
9	1936	June 28	I Circuito di Milano	-	Maserati	-	4th
10	1936	July 12	Albi Grand Prix	-	Maserati 4CM	-	DNF
11	1936	August 2	X Coppa Ciano	-	Maserati 4CM	-	DNF
12	1936	August 23	III Prix de Berne	-	Maserati 4CM	-	10th
13	1936	September 7	II Coppa Edda Ciano	-	Maserati 4C	-	4th
14	1936	September 13	1936 Italian Grand Prix	Scuderia Torino	Maserati	Piero Dusio; Carlo Felice Trossi	DNS
15	1936	September 21	V Circuito di Modena	-	Maserati 4CM	-	DNF
16	1937	April 18	II Gran Premio del Valentino	Officine Alfieri Maserati	Maserati 6CM	René Dreyfus; Gino Rovere	4th
17	1937	April 25	III Coppa Principessa di Piemonte	Officine Alfieri Maserati	Maserati 6CM	Carlo Felice Trossi; Franco Cortese; Vittorio Belmondo	5th
18	1937	May 9	XI Gran Premio di Tripoli	Officine Alfieri Maserati	Maserati 8C	Pietro Ghersi; René Dreyfus	DNF
19	1937	May 23	XXVII Targa Florio	Officine Alfieri Maserati	Maserati 6CM	Francesco Severi	3rd
20	1937	May 30	VI Internationales Avus Rennen	Ettore Bianco	Maserati 8C	none	DNS
21	1937	May 30	I Circuito della Superba	-	Maserati	-	DNS
22	1937	June 13	Gran Premio di Firenze	Officine Alfieri Maserati	Maserati 6CM	Giovanni Rocco; René Dreyfus; Carlo Felice Trossi; Gino Rovere	3rd
23	1937	June 20	II Circuito di Milano	-	Maserati	-	DNS
24	1937	July 25	San Remo Grand Prix (Heat 1)	Officine Alfieri Maserati	Maserati 6CM	Achille Varzi; Giovanni Rocco	4th
25	1937	August 15	XIII Coppa Acerbo	Officine Alfieri Maserati	Maserati 6CM	Giovanni Rocco	2nd
26	1937	September 19	III Coppa Edda Ciano	Officine Alfieri Maserati	Maserati 6CM	Carlo Felice Trossi; Achille Varzi	DNF
27	1937	September 26	Circuito di Campione d'Italia	Officine Alfieri Maserati	Maserati 6CM	Giovanni Rocco; Aldo Marazza; Carlo Felice Trossi	DNF
28	1938	May 15	XII Gran Premio di Tripoli	Scuderia Subauda	Maserati 6CM	Edoardo Teagno	4th
29	1938	May 22	XXIX Targa Florio	Scuderia Subauda	Maserati 6CM	Dioscoride Lanza; Edoardo Teagno	DNF
30	1938	June 12	XIV Grand Prix de Picardie	Scuderia Subauda	Maserati 4CM	Luigi Soffietti; Dioscoride Lanza	3rd
31	1938	June 26	IV Coppa Principessa di Piemonte	Scuderia Subauda	Maserati 4CM	Edoardo Teagno; Dioscoride Lanza; Luigi Soffietti	4th
32	1938	July 10	Grand Prix de l'Albigeois	Scuderia Subauda	Maserati 4CM	Edoardo Teagno; Dioscoride Lanza	DNF
33	1938	July 17	Circuito Varese	Scuderia Subauda	Maserati 4CM	Edoardo Teagno; Dioscoride Lanza	DNS
34	1938	August 7	Coppa Ciano	Scuderia Subauda	Maserati 4CM	Edoardo Teagno	DNS
35	1938	August 7	XIV Coppa Acerbo	Scuderia Subauda	Maserati 4CM	none	DNF
36	1938	August 21	V Prix de Berne	Ettore Bianco	Maserati 4CM	none	2nd
37	1938	August 28	Grand Prix de la Baule	Scuderia Subauda	Maserati 4CM	none	DNS
38	1938	September 4	IV Coppa Edda Ciano	Scuderia Subauda	Maserati 4CM	none	DNF
39	1938	September 11	Gran Premio di Milano	Scuderia Subauda	Maserati 4CM	Edoardo Teagno	6th
40	1939	May 7	XIII Gran Premio di Tripoli	Ettore Bianco	Maserati	none	DNF
41	1939	May 14	XXX Targa Florio	Ettore Bianco	Maserati 4CM	none	DNF
42	1939	May 28	V Coppa Principessa di Piemonte	Ettore Bianco	Maserati 4CM	none	5th
43	1939	August 20	VI Prix de Berne	-	-	-	DNS
44	1940	May 12	XIV Gran Premio di Tripoli	-	Maserati 4CL	-	13th
45	1940	May 23	Targa Florio	-	Maserati 4CL	-	4th
46	1947	June 22	Mille Miglia	-	Fiat	"Ruffa"	DNS
47	1948	May 2	Mille Miglia	-	Fiat 500	none	DNS
48	1952	June 1	XIV Grand Prix d'Albi	Ettore Bianco	Maserati 4CLT/48	none	DNF
