= Luigi Soffietti =

Italian racing driver

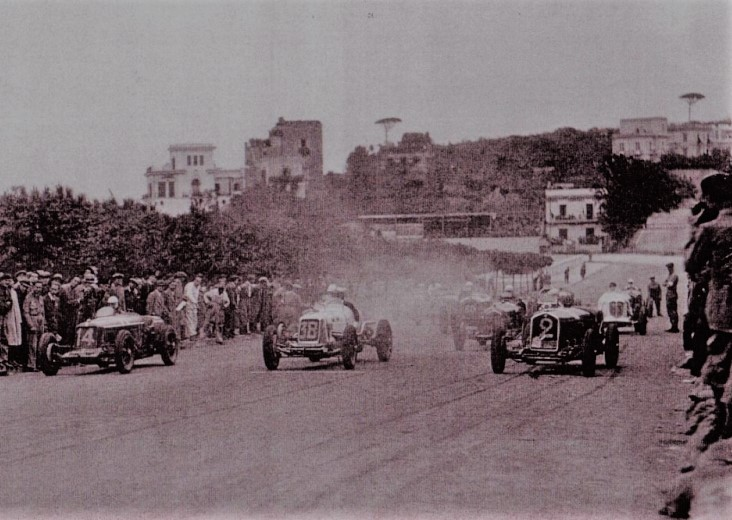
Soffietti in 1934

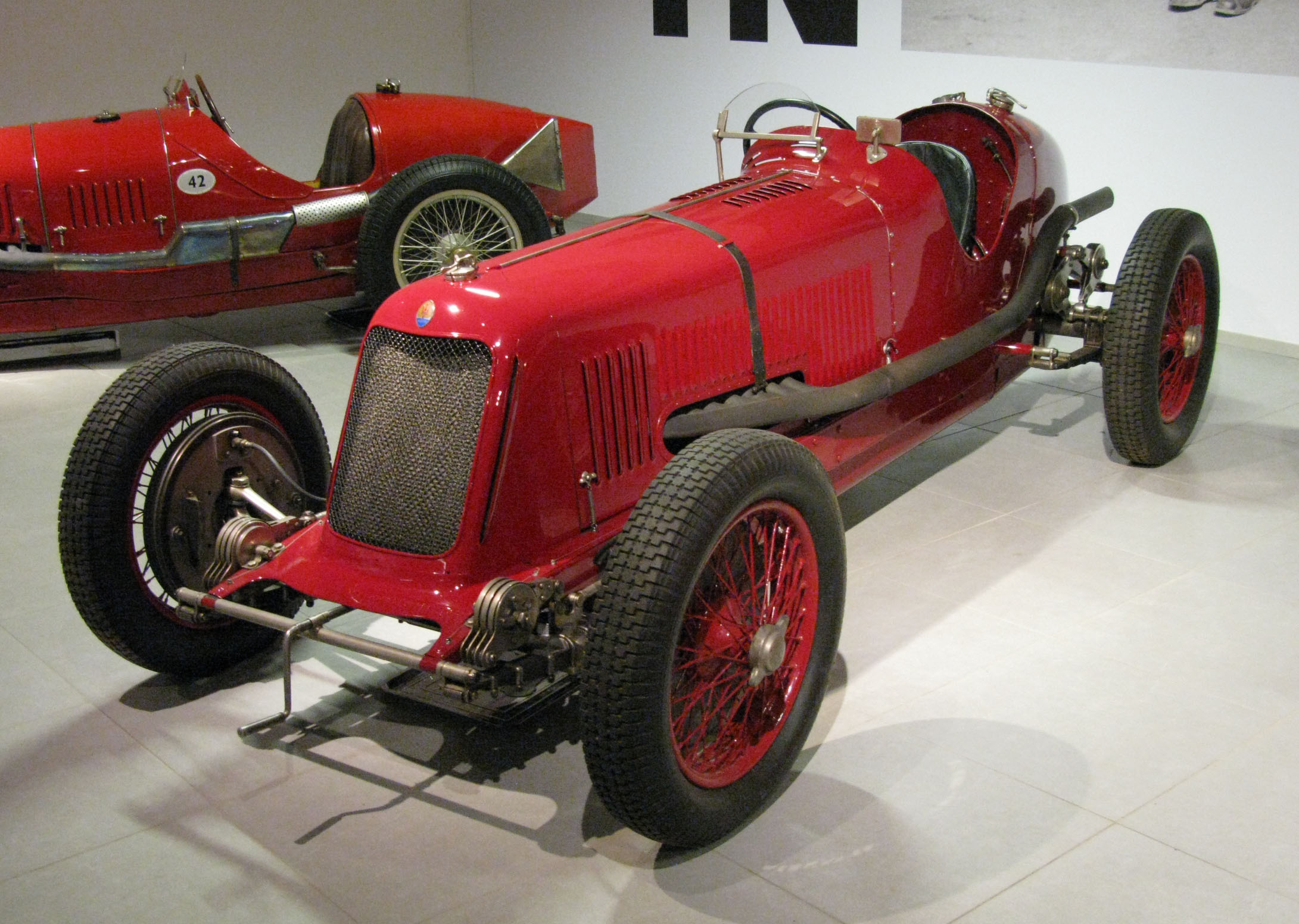
1933 Maserati 8CM

Luigi "Gigi" Soffietti is an Italian former racing driver. He entered 56 sports car races and Grands Prix between 1932 and 1938 (48 started) in Alfa Romeos and Maseratis. Notable entries include the Mille Miglia and Targa Florio, but also the German Grand Prix, the Tripoli Grand Prix (both three times), and the Monaco Grand Prix (twice).

No.	Year	Date	Race	Location	Entrant	Car	Teammate(s)	Result
1	1932	June 19	Ponte X-Passo dei Giovi Hillclimb	Pontedecimo	Scuderia Ferrari	Alfa Romeo 6C 1750 Gran Sport TF	none	13th
2	1932	June 26	Sassi-Superga Hillclimb	Turin	Scuderia Ferrari	Alfa Romeo 6C 1750 Gran Sport TF	none	6th
3	1932	July 10	Coppa del Cimino Hillclimb	Viterbo	Scuderia Ferrari	Alfa Romeo 6C 1500 Gran Sport	none	8th
4	1932	July 24	Circuito di Avellino	Circuito Principe di Piemonte	Scuderia Ferrari	Alfa Romeo 6C 1750 Gran Sport TF	none	DNF
5	1932	August 15	Targa Abruzzo	Pescara Circuit	Scuderia Ferrari	Alfa Romeo 6C 1500	none	6th
6	1933	April 9	Mille Miglia	Brescia–Rome–Brescia		Alfa Romeo 6C 1750 Gran Sport	"A. Casti"	12th
7	1933	April 30	IX° Circuito di Pietro Bordino (Heat 2)	Alessandria	L. Soffietti	Alfa Romeo 6C	Gugelielmo Carraroli	7th
8	1934	April 8	Mille Miglia	Brescia–Rome–Brescia	Scuderia Siena	Alfa Romeo 8C 2300 Monza	Giovanni Minozzi	DNF
9	1934	April 22	Circuito di Pietro Bordino	Alessandria	Scuderia Siena	Alfa Romeo 8C 2300 Monza	Giovanni Minozzi; Carlo Pedrazzini	6th
10	1934	April 30	Parma-Poggio di Berceto Hillclimb	Parma	Scuderia Siena	Alfa Romeo 8C 2600 Monza	none	5th
11	1934	May 20	1934 Moroccan Grand Prix	Anfa Circuit	Scuderia Siena	Alfa Romeo 8C 2300 Monza	Giovanni Minozzi	DNF
12	1934	June 3	I Grand Prix de Montreux	Montreux	L. Soffietti	Alfa Romeo 8C 2300 Monza	none	DNF
13	1934	June 10	Torino - Colle della Maddalena Hillclimb	Turin	L. Soffieti	Alfa Romeo 8C 2300 Monza	none	6th
14	1934	June 29	Targa Vesuvio Hillclimb	Naples	L. Soffieti	Alfa Romeo 8C 2300 Monza	none	2nd
15	1934	July 8	IX Grand Prix de la Marne	Reims-Gueux	Scuderia Ferrari	Alfa Romeo 8C 2300 Monza	Louis Chiron; Achille Varzi; Guy Moll	6th
16	1934	July 15	1934 German Grand Prix	Nürburgring	Scuderia Siena	Alfa Romeo 8C 2300 Monza	Giovanni Minozzi	DNF
17	1934	July 22	VI Grand Prix de Dieppe	Dieppe	Scuderia Siena	Alfa Romeo	none	DNA
18	1934	August 26	1934 Swiss Grand Prix	Circuit Bremgarten	L. Soffietti	Alfa Romeo 8C 2300 Monza	none	DNS
19	1934	September 23	1934 Spanish Grand Prix	Circuito Lasarte	Scuderia Siena	Maserati 8CM	none	9th
20	1934	September 30	Montreux - Caux Hillclimb	Montreux	L. Soffietti	Alfa Romeo 8C 2300 Monza	none	7th
21	1934	October 14	III Circuito di Modena	Modena	Scuderia Siena	Maserati 8CM	none	7th
22	1934	October 21	II Coppa Principessa di Piemonte	Naples	Scuderia Siena	Maserati 8CM	Giovanni Minozzi	6th
23	1934	October 28	1934 Algerian Grand Prix	Bouzaréah	Scuderia Siena	Maserati 8CM	Giovanni Minozzi	3rd
24	1935	February 24	III Pau Grand Prix	Pau	L. Soffietti	Maserati 8CM	none	3rd
25	1935	April 14	Mille Miglia	Brescia-Rome-Brescia	L. Soffietti	Alfa Romeo 8C 2300 Monza	Edoardo Teagno	DNA
26	1935	April 14	1935 Monaco Grand Prix	Circuit de Monaco	L. Soffietti	Alfa Romeo 8C 2300 Monza	none	8th
27	1935	May 5	Tunis Grand Prix	Carthage Street Circuit	L. Soffietti	Maserati 8CM	none	DNF
28	1935	May 12	IX° Tripoli Grand Prix	Autodromo di Mellaha	L. Soffietti	Maserati 8CM	none	DNF
29	1935	May 19	I Coppa Citta di Bergamo	Circuito di Bergamo	Ecurie Versoix	Alfa Romeo 8C 2300 Monza	none	4th
30	1935	May 26	XI Picardy Grand Prix	Péronne	L. Soffietti	Maserati 8CM	none	DNF
31	1935	June 9	II Circuito di Biella	Biella	L. Soffietti	Maserati 8CM	none	DNF
32	1935	June 30	VI° Penya Rhin Grand Prix	Montjuïc Circuit	L. Soffietti	Maserati 8CM	none	6th
33	1935	July 7	XI Grand Prix de la Marne	Reims-Gueux	L. Soffietti	Maserati 8CM	none	DNF
34	1935	July 28	1935 German Grand Prix	Nürburgring	L. Soffietti	Maserati 8CM	none	DNS
35	1935	August 4	XI Grand Prix du Comminges	Saint-Gaudens	L. Soffietti	Maserati 8CM	none	DNA
36	1935	August 4	IX° Coppa Ciano	Montenero Circuit	L. Soffietti	Maserati 8CM	none	9th
37	1935	August 15	XI° Coppa Acerbo	Pescara Circuit	L. Soffietti	Maserati 8CM	none	DNF
38	1935	August 18	IV Nice Grand Prix	Nice	L. Soffietti	Maserati 8CM	none	6th
39	1935	September 15	IV° Circuito di Modena	Modena	L. Soffietti	Maserati 8CM	none	DNA
40	1936	May 10	1936 Tripoli Grand Prix	Autodromo di Mellaha	L. Soffietti	Maserati 8CM	none	DNF
41	1937	April 18	II° Gran Premio del Valentino / Circuito di Torino (Voiturette)	Parco del Valentino	L. Soffietti	Maserati 6CM	none	DNF
42	1937	April 25	III° Coppa Principessa di Piemonte	Posillipo	L. Soffietti	Maseati 6C-34	none	DNF
43	1937	April 25	III° Coppa Principessa di Piemonte (Voiturette)	Posillipo	L. Soffietti	Maserati 4CM	none	DNA
44	1937	May 9	XI° Tripoli Grand Prix	Autodromo di Mellaha	L. Soffietti	Maserati 6C-34	none	15th
45	1937	May 30	VI Internationales Avus Rennen (Heat 2)	Berlin	L. Soffietti	Maserati 8CM	none	5th
46	1937	June 13	XI Adac Eifelrennen	Nürburgring	L. Soffietti	Maserati 6C-34	none	11th
47	1937	July 25	1937 German Grand Prix	Nürburgring	L. Soffietti	Maserati 6C-34	none	DNF
48	1937	August 8	1937 Monaco Grand Prix	Circuit de Monaco	L. Soffietti	Maserati 6C-34	none	DNF
49	1937	August 22	1937 Swiss Grand Prix	Bremgarten Circuit	Scuderia Subauda	Maserati 8CM	Edoardo Teagno	DNS
50	1937	September 26	VII Czechoslovakian Grand Prix	Masaryk Circuit	L. Soffietti	Maserati 6C-34	none	DNF
51	1938	April 23	Cork International Light Car Race	Carrigrohane	Scuderia Subauda	Maserati 4CM	none	6th
52	1938	May 22	XXIX° Targa Florio	Favorita Park, Palermo	Gruppo Volta	Maserati 6CM	Pino Baruffi	5th
53	1938	June 12	XIV Picardy Grand Prix	Péronne	Scuderia Subauda	Maserati 4CM	Ettore Bianco; Dioscoride Lanza	3rd
54	1938	June 26	IV° Coppa Principessa di Piemonte	Posillipo	Scuderia Subauda	Maserati 6CM	Ettore Bianco; Edoardo Teagno; Dioscoride Lanza	6th
55	1938	July 10	Albi Grand Prix	Circuit d'Albi	Gruppo Volta	Maserati 6CM	Luciano Uboldi	2nd
56	1938	July 17	Circuito Varese	Varese	Scuderia Ambrosiana	Maserati 6CM	Luigi Villoresi; Eugenio Minetti; Sergio Carnevalli	DNF
