= 1934 Moroccan Grand Prix =

1934 Anfa Grand Prix
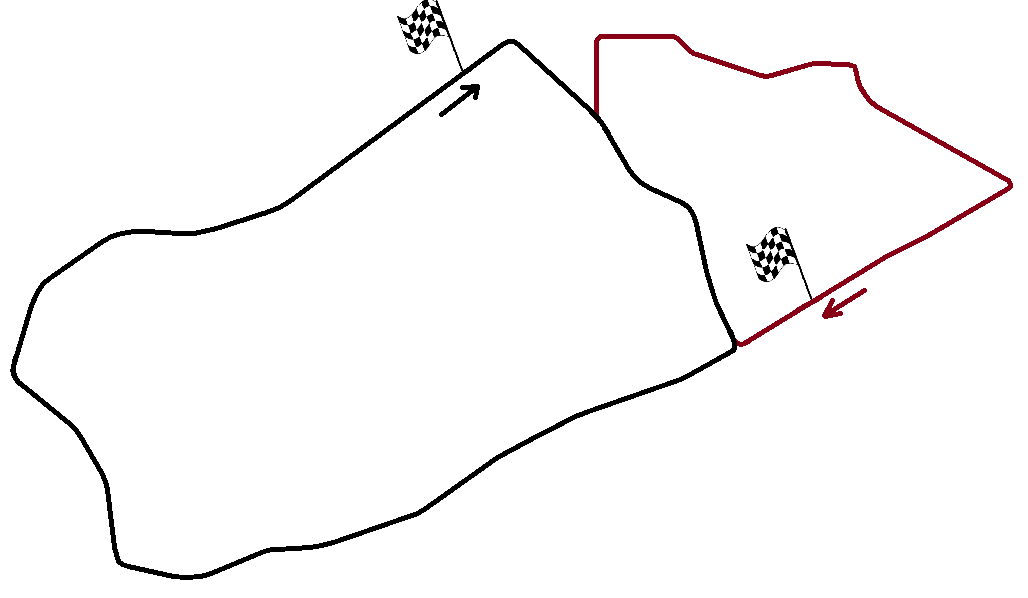
- Layouts of Anfa Circuit (brown) and Ain-Diab Circuit (black)

Race details
- Date: 20 May 1934
- Official name: 1934 Anfa Grand Prix
- Location: Anfa, Casablanca, Morocco
- Course: Street circuit
- Course length: 6.37 km (3.96 miles)
- Distance: 60 laps, 382.2 km (237.6 miles)

Pole position
Driver	(France) Marcel Lehoux	Scuderia Ferrari
- Time: 2:49

Fastest lap
Driver	(Monaco) Louis Chiron	Scuderia Ferrari
- Time: 2:49.2

Podium
First	(Monaco) Louis Chiron	Scuderia Ferrari
Second	(France) Philippe Étancelin	P. Étancelin
Third	(France) Marcel Lehoux	Scuderia Ferrari

The 1934 Moroccan Grand Prix (also known as the 1934 Anfa Grand Prix or the 1934 Casablanca Grand Prix) was a Grand Prix that was held on 20 May 1934 at the street circuit in Anfa, a suburb of Casablanca, Morocco. The race, contested over 60 laps of 6.37 km (3.96 mi), was won by Louis Chiron driving an Alfa Romeo Tipo B after starting from second position.

== Entries ==
No.	Driver	Entrant	Car
2	Menco	Menco	Maserati 26M
4	(France) Marcel Lehoux	Scuderia Ferrari	Alfa Romeo Tipo B
6	(Italy) Luigi Soffietti	Scuderia Siena	Alfa Romeo 8C 2300 Monza
8	(Italy) Clemente Biondetti	Grupa Genovese San Giorgio	Maserati 26M
10	(Italy) Gianfranco Comotti	Scuderia Ferrari	Alfa Romeo Tipo B
12	(United Kingdom) Whitney Straight	Whitney Straight	Maserati 8CM
14	(Chile) Juan Zanelli	J. Zanelli	Alfa Romeo 8C 2300 Monza
16	(France) Philippe Étancelin	P. Étancelin	Maserati 8CM
18	(United Kingdom) Hugh Hamilton	Whitney Straight	Maserati 8CM
20	(France) Raymond Sommer	R. Sommer	Maserati 8CM
22	(France) "Mlle. Hellé-Nice"	"Mlle. Hellé-Nice"	Alfa Romeo 8C 2300 Monza
24	(Italy) Giovanni Minozzi	Scuderia Siena	Alfa Romeo 8C 2300 Monza
26	(France) Robert Brunet	R. Brunet	Bugatti T51
28	(Italy) Secondo Corsi	Grupa Genovese San Giorgio	Maserati 26M
30	(Monaco) Louis Chiron	Scuderia Ferrari	Alfa Romeo Tipo B

== Grid positions ==
Pos.	Driver	Car Constructor	Time
1	Marcel Lehoux	Alfa Romeo	2:49
2	Louis Chiron	Alfa Romeo	2:49
3	Philippe Étancelin	Maserati	2:50
4	Whitney Straight	Maserati	
5	Hugh Hamilton	Maserati	
6	Giovanni Minozzi	Alfa Romeo	2:56
7	Luigi Soffietti	Alfa Romeo	3:00
8	Gianfranco Comotti	Alfa Romeo	3:01
9	Juan Zanelli	Alfa Romeo	3:02
10	Robert Brunet	Bugatti	3:08
11	Raymond Sommer	Maserati	
12	Clemente Biondetti	Maserati	
13	"Mlle. Hellé-Nice"	Alfa Romeo	
14	"Menco"	Maserati	
15	Secondo Corsi	Maserati	

== Race report ==
Soon in the race Chiron took over the lead from Lehoux, who later got into a long fight with Philippe Étancelin for second position. Comotti, Straight and Hamilton were fighting for fourth position. When Lehoux's tyre blew he had to make multiple extra pitstops, which made him fall back in the field. Teammates Straight and Hamilton also struck tyre trouble and at the end of the race Hamilton had to retire with a leaking fuel tank. Lehoux fought back to third position finishing behind Étancelin. Chiron, driving an Alfa Romeo Tipo B, completed the required 60 laps the fastest and took victory.

== Race results ==
Pos.	Driver	Car Constructor	Time (Diff.)/Status
1	Louis Chiron	Alfa Romeo	2:55:42.4
2	Philippe Étancelin	Maserati	+50.2
3	Marcel Lehoux	Alfa Romeo	+1 lap
4	Whitney Straight	Maserati	+2 laps
5	Gianfranco Comotti	Alfa Romeo	+2 laps
6	Giovanni Minozzi	Alfa Romeo	+3 laps
7	Juan Zanelli	Alfa Romeo	
8	Clemente Biondetti	Maserati	
9	Robert Brunet	Bugatti	
10	Luigi Soffietti	Alfa Romeo	+6 laps (DNF)
11	Hugh Hamilton	Maserati	+18 laps (DNF — fuel tank)
12	Secondo Corsi	Maserati	+31 laps (DNF — oil pipe)
13	Raymond Sommer	Maserati	+45 laps (DNF — clutch)
14	"Mlle. Hellé-Nice"	Alfa Romeo	+47 laps (DNF — rear axle)
15	"Menco"	Maserati	+59 laps (DNF — crash)

== Other sources ==
- Racing Sports Cars (The page of each aforementioned driver was consulted.)
- Driver Database (The page of each aforementioned driver was consulted.)
- The Golden Era of Grand Prix Racing - Drivers (The page of each aforementioned driver was consulted.)
