= Aldo Marazza =

Italian racing driver

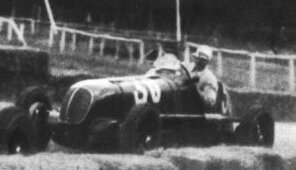
- Marazza at the 1938 Targa Florio
- Born: Aldo Marazza; 1912 Milan, Lombardy, Kingdom of Italy
- Died: September 12, 1938 (aged 25–26) Milan, Lombardy, Kingdom of Italy
- Years active: 1936-1938

Aldo Marazza (1912 – 12 September 1938) was an Italian voiturette racing driver, winning two races from this thirteen starts.

Marazza's first race was the 1936 Modena Grand Prix, from which he was forced to retire for safety reasons. His first win would come in the 1937 Circuito della Superba voiturette race in Genoa, racing his privately owned Maserati 4CS (#1519), previously owned by Count Giovanni Lurani and Giuseppe Gilera, after a battle with Vittorio Belmondo.

He would run seven more races that year with the highlight being a second place at the Sempione Park circuit in Milan. Despite some disappointing results in his other races, this was enough to secure a place in the works Maserati team for the race at Campione d'Italia, where he would hand over his car to Carlo Felice Trossi who was competing for the championship.

Marazza started the 1938 season by competing in the Targa Florio driving a Maserati 6CM, where he led for a number of laps before being forced to retire from the race when second place Luigi Villoresi crashed into him when attempting a pass.

His next race would be the 1938 Grand Prix of Naples, which he would win comfortably, followed by good results at Varese Circuit and Coppa Ciano.

His final race would be the 1938 Milan Grand Prix (a voiturette race held alongside the Italian Grand Prix at Monza). At the end of the race, likely unable to see the chequered flag due to smoke from the recently retired car Raymond Sommer, Marazza proceeded at full speed during the cooldown lap, crashing into a tree at the first Lesmo. He would die from his injuries at 3:15am the following morning.
