= Edoardo Teagno =

Italian racing driver (1902–45)

- Born: Edoardo Teagno; 17 January 1902
- Died: 15 May 1945 (aged 43) Castelfranco Emilia, Italy

Edoardo Teagno (17 January 1902 – 15 May 1945) was an Italian Grand Prix driver active in the 1930s.

== Career ==
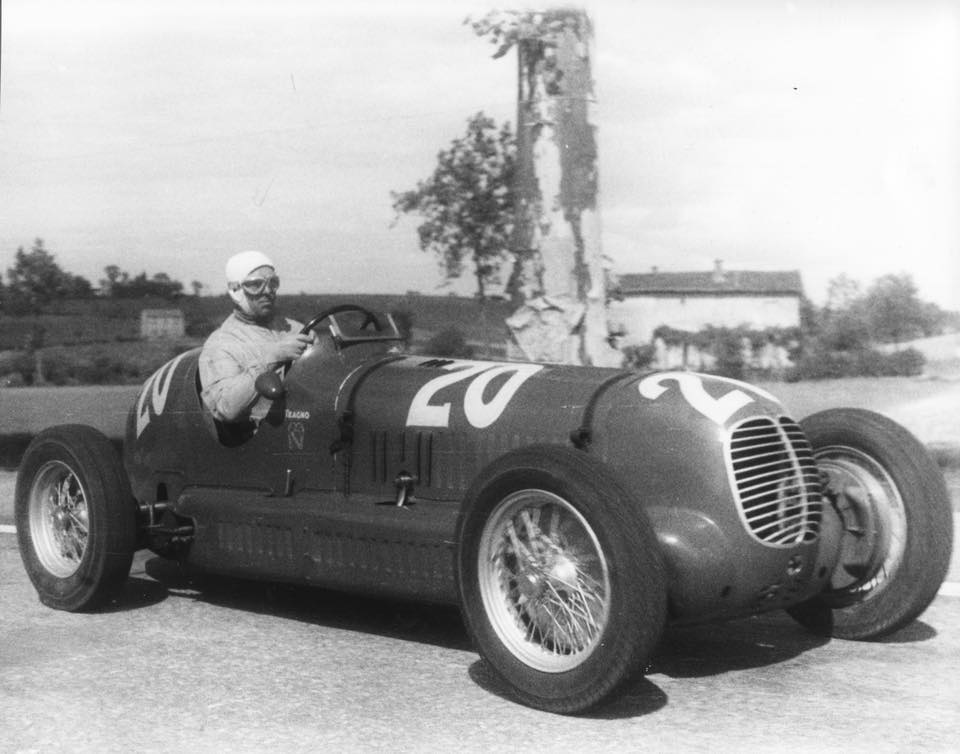
Teagno in Maserati 6CM at the 1938 Albi Grand Prix

Teagno was mostly active in voiturette racing, driving his Maserati 6CM, in the late 1930s. He did however take part in two Grands Prix; the 1937 German Grand Prix and the 1938 Swiss Grand Prix, both for the Torinese Scuderia Subauda, retiring (after running last) in the former and finishing 14th (and last) in the latter, with Prince Bira (who had suffered a second-lap retirement in the supporting Prix de Berne) taking over the drive on lap 16 (out of 50) "for a few laps". He also finished 8th at the 1937 Mille Miglia with Nando Barbieri in an Alfa Romeo 8C 2300.

Teagno's greatest achievement in voiturette racing was winning the 1939 Coppa Ciano amateur class race in his 6CM. He was also runner-up in the same class at the subsequent Coppa Acerbo, the achievement qualifying him for the Coppa Acerbo proper, alongside two other amateur drivers - sadly one of them, Catullo Lami, crashed fatally on the first lap.

== World War 2 and death ==
Teagno served with the Fascist Guardia Nazionale Repubblicana and reached the rank of Captain. On 15 May 1945, while acting as driver for local party leader Secondo Ronza, Teagno and Ronza (with a third unknown man) were caught by partisans at Castelfranco Emilia, holding 1.7m lire of stolen money, and were all murdered.

== External sites ==
- Full results
