= Maserati 6CM =

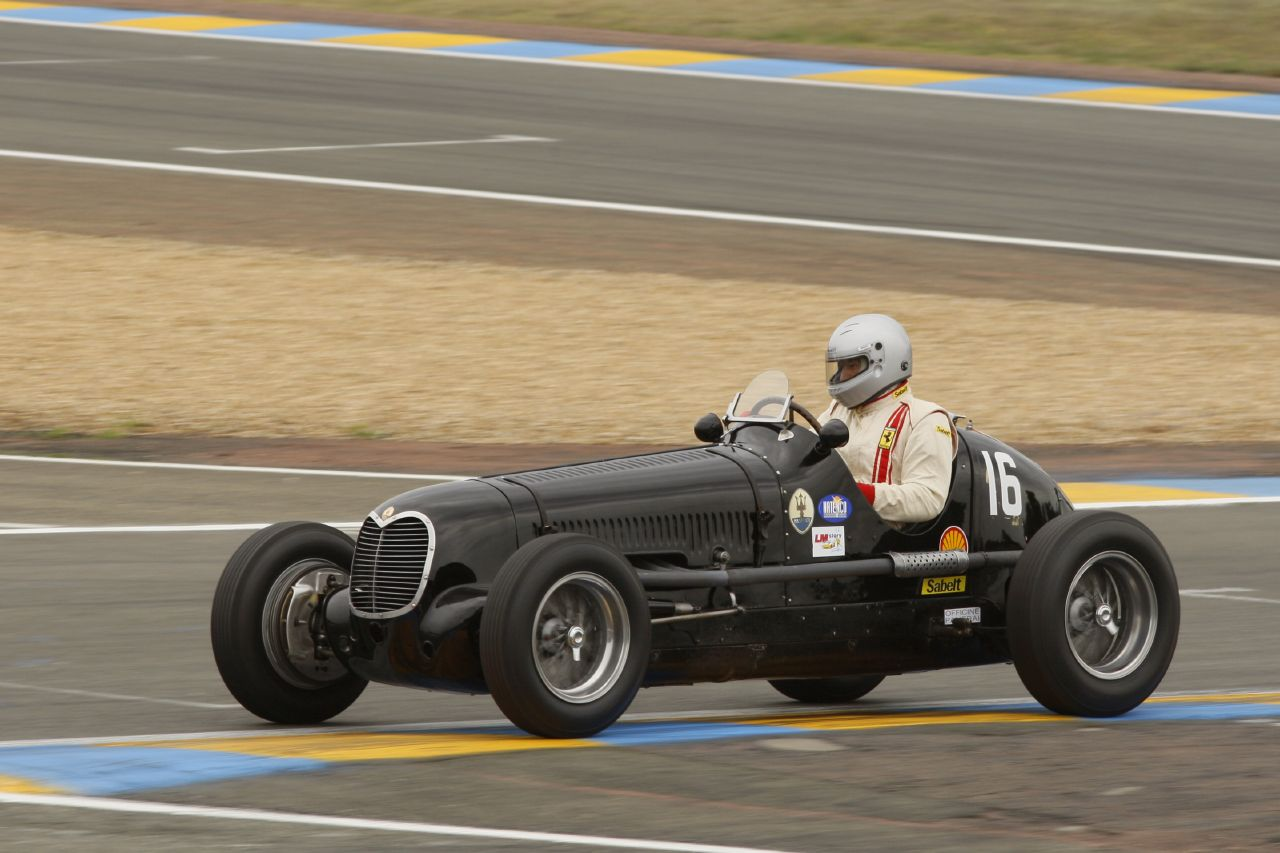

Overview
- Manufacturer: Maserati
- Production: 1936–1940

Body and chassis
- Class: Racing car
- Body style: Single-seater

Powertrain
- Engine: 1,493.2 cc (91.12 cu in) inline-6

Dimensions
- Wheelbase: 2,490 mm (98 in)
- Length: 3,720 mm (146 in)
- Width: 1,480 mm (58 in)
- Height: 1,200 mm (47 in)
- Curb weight: 650 kg (1,430 lb)

Chronology
- Predecessor: Maserati 4CM
- Successor: Maserati 4CL

The Maserati 6CM is an Italian single-seater racing car, made by Maserati of Modena from 1936 to 1940 for the Voiturette racing class. Twenty-seven were built on the Maserati 4CM frame, with front suspension as on the Maserati V8RI, and had a successful racing career from 1936 to 1939. The 6CM was introduced to the world at the 1936 Milan Motor Show. Maserati spent much of its early years manufacturing cars for privateers in the racing field. The Maserati 6CM is no exception.

== Engine ==
Specifics of the first chassis built:

- 1,493.2 cc (91.12 cu in) inline-6 engine
- Bore was 65 mm and stroke was 75 mm
- two overhead valves per cylinder, mounted at 90 degrees
- Roots type supercharger
- Weber carburetor 55ASI
- Scintilla ignition
- Pirelli tyres

The engine consists of six cylinders in-line, with two overhead valves per cylinder. Also, the car has a Scintilla ignition system as well as a single Roots-type supercharger and a Weber carburetor 55ASI. The 6CM has a four-speed gear box plus reverse and was capable of 155 bhp (brake horsepower) (116 kW) at 6200 rpm in the first model (as stated above) but its output by 1939 was increased to 175 bhp (130 kW) at 6600 rpm.

== Basic information ==
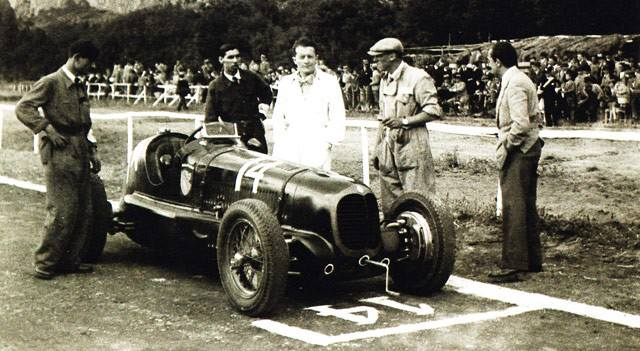
The 6CM of Ferdinando Righetti, a private driver

The 6CM's dimensions are 3.72 metres (12.2 ft) long, 1.48 meters wide, and 1.2 meters tall. It contains a single 120-liter (32 U.S. gal) (31.7 gallon) gasoline tank. It has a wheel base of 2.49 metres (8 ft 2 in) with the front and rear tracks being equal at 1.2 meters. The tyres on the model are different from front to back, with the rear tyres being narrower and taller. It weighs 650 kilograms (1,430 lb).

== Successes in racing ==
The 6CM was a successful car in the racing world. It held victories in Europe, which was a powerhouse at the time for grand prix racing. With the rise of Adolf Hitler in 1933, the racing world became even more competitive. Hitler wanted to prove that the Germans were the best at everything, including motor racing. Hitler funded both Daimler- Mercedes and Auto Union. This created the drive to make a better car for the grand prix circuit and thus, the 6CM was born.

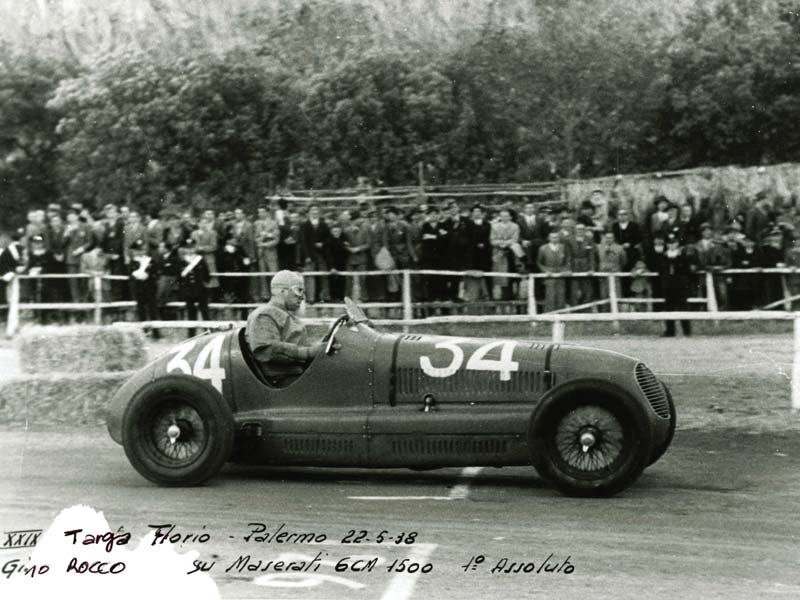
Giovanni Rocco, Targa Florio 1938

=== Chassis 1532 ===
One of the twenty seven constructed was raced by Count Felice "Didi" Trossi to victory in four of the five races in which he competed. In the race he did not win he came second. The most "rewarding" race victory came at Monaco.

=== Chassis 1531 ===
Despite not winning with Count Trossi, the car was highly competitive with American driver Harry Schell in big races such as at Monaco and Goodwood.

=== Successes at Modena ===
Maserati's "home track" in Modena was the home of victories for Maserati in the mid to late thirties. Modena was the site for three separate Maserati victories, one in the 4CM in 1935, and the 6CM was victorious in both 1936 and 1938.

== Other chassis and racers ==
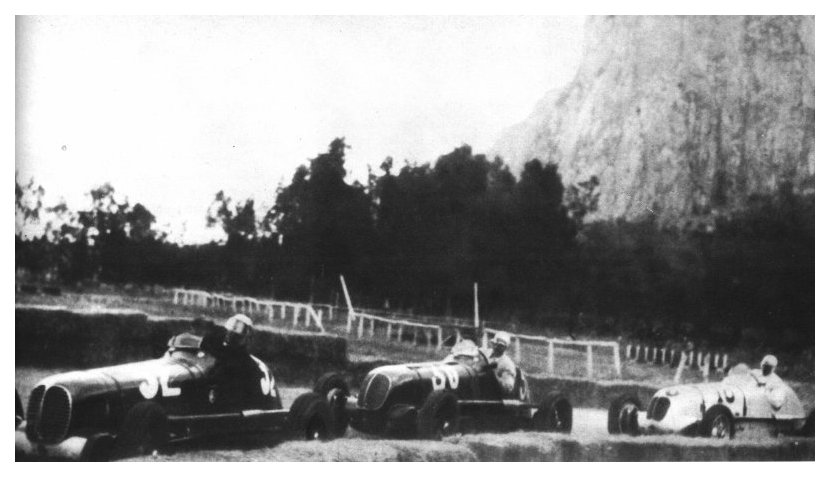
Villoresi (32) in the lead

Most cars were sold to private owners such as Austin Dobson, Lord Howe and John Peter Wakefield. Among the private teams that ran 6CMs were Scuderia Ambrosiana and Ecurie Helvetica. Maserati's works team also raced them successfully, including in the Grand Prix of Naples and the Targa Florio, with drivers Aldo Marazza, Luigi Villoresi and Ettore Bianco.

== Technical data ==
Maserati 6CM (Monoposto)
engine	6 cylinders, in-line, front, installed longitudinally
Displacement	1493 cc (91.1 cui)
Bore × Stroke	65 mm × 75 mm (2.56 in × 2.95 in)
Compression ratio	6.0:1
Performance	155-175 hp at 6200-6600 rpm
Valve control	two overhead camshafts / 2 valves per cylinder
Mixture preparation	Weber 55AS1 carburetor, Roots blower
cooling	Water
transmission	4-speed transmission, not synchronized (rear-wheel drive)
Brakes	Drum brake
Front suspension	double wishbone
Rear suspension	Live axle
Body and frame	Aluminum body on box frame
Wheelbase	2490mm
Track width front/rear	1200mm / 1200mm
Tire size front	–
Rear tire size	–
Dimensions L × W × H	3720mm × 1480mm × 1200mm
Curb weight (without driver)	650 kg
Tank contents	–
Fuel consumption	–
Top speed	approx. 230 km/h
Specific output	117 HP/l (86.0 kW dm^{−3})
Power to Weight	0.27 PS·kg^{−1} (198.58 W·kg^{−1})

== Maserati 6CM Chassis 1561, built in 1938, at the Hockenheim Historic 2021 ==
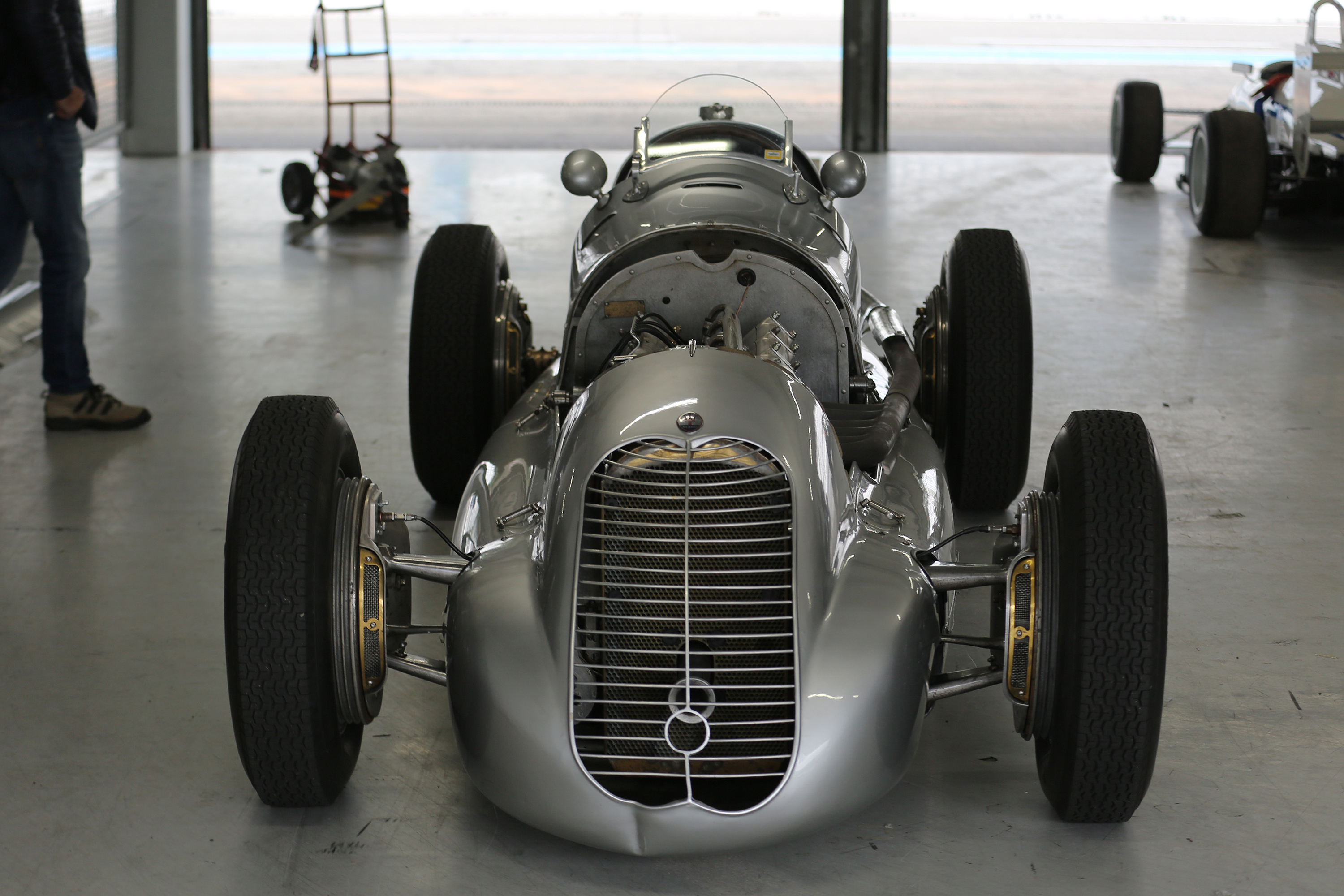

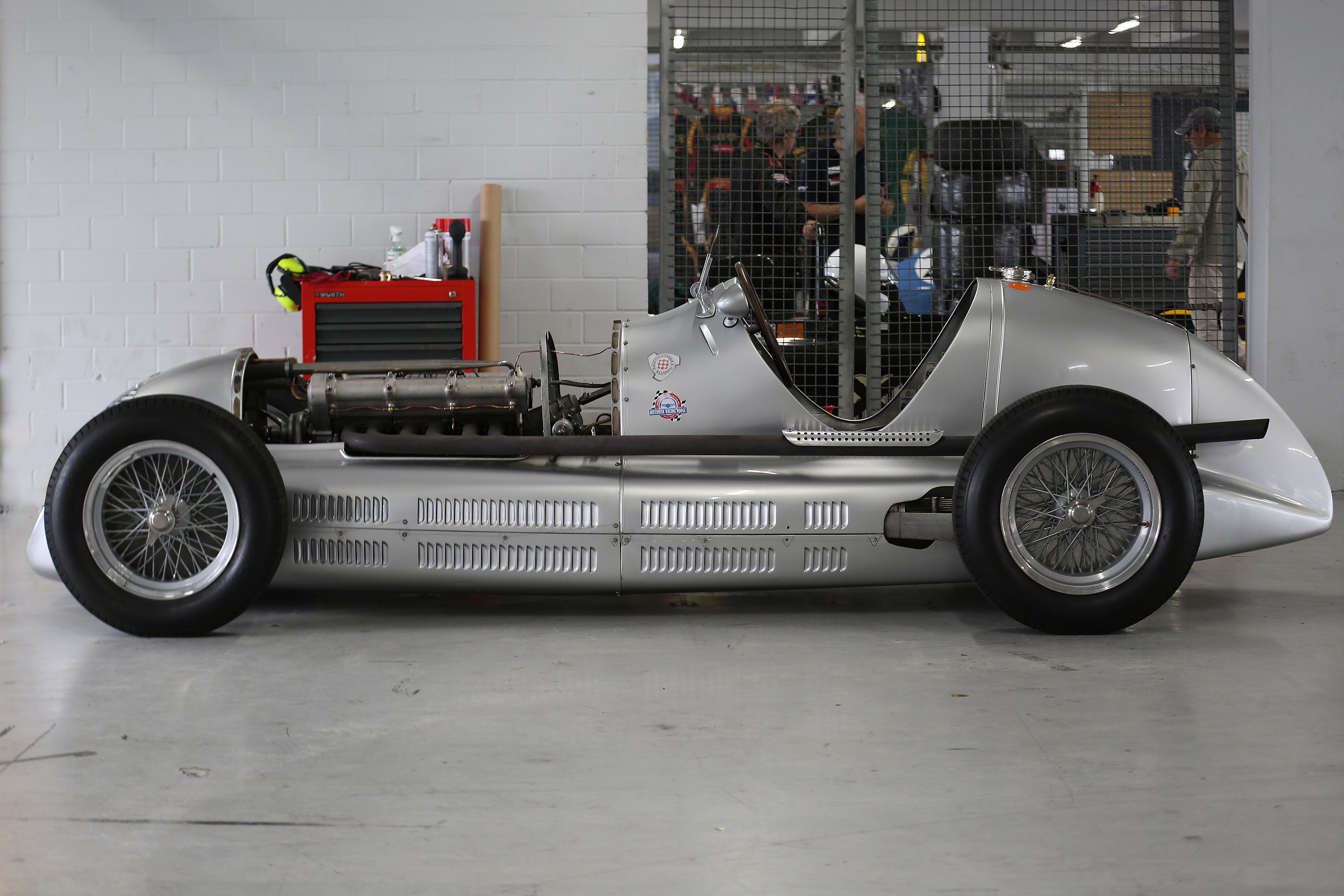

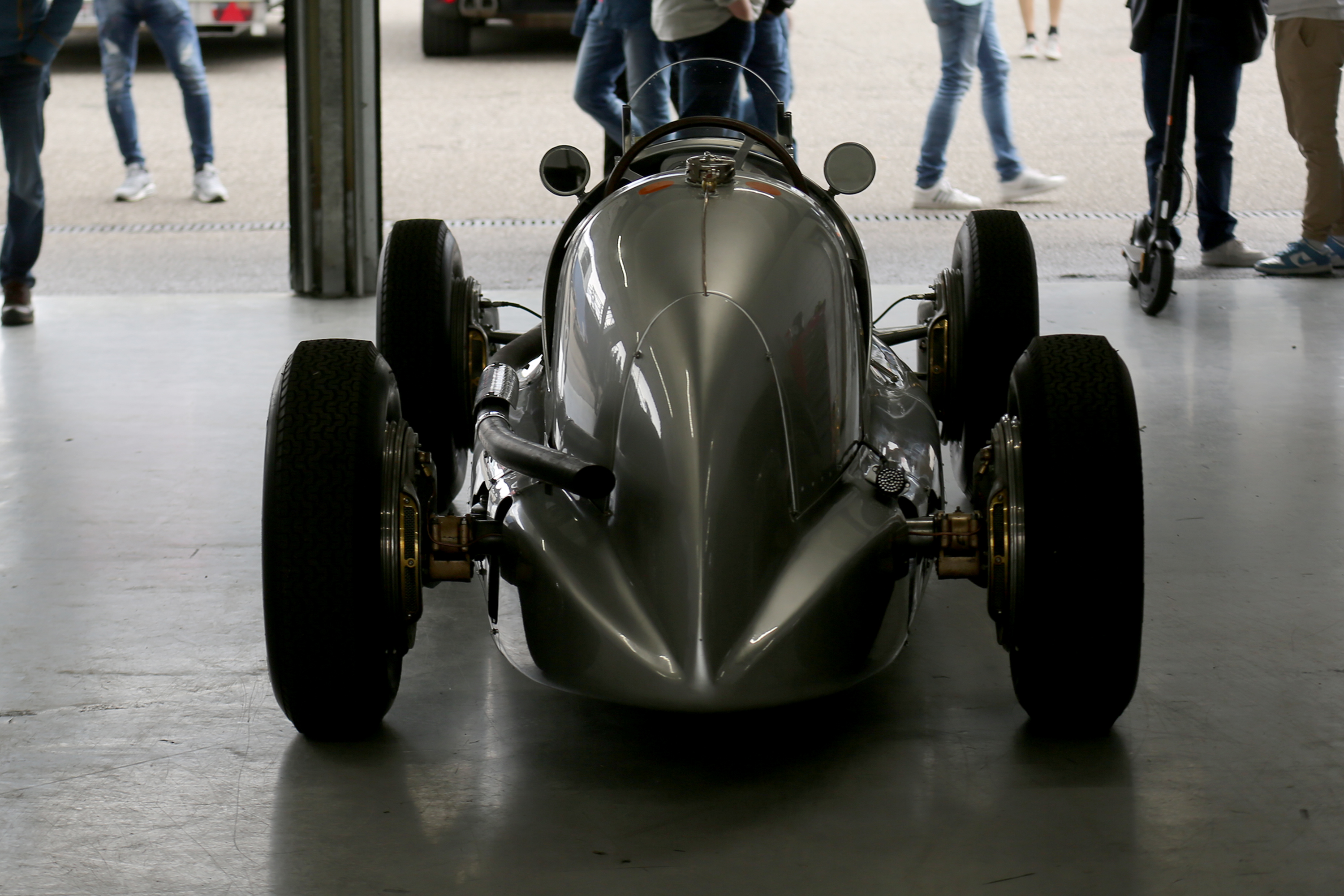

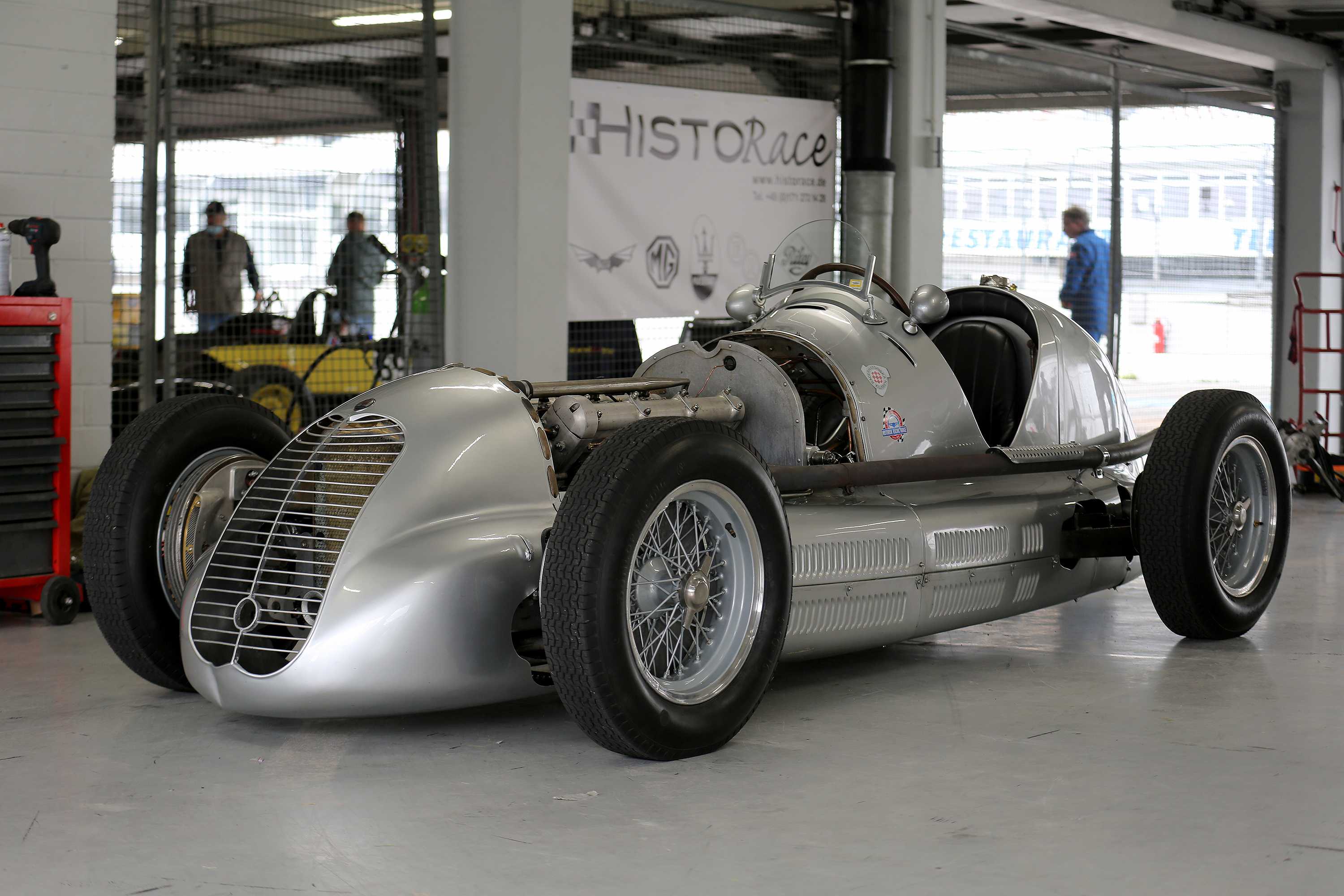
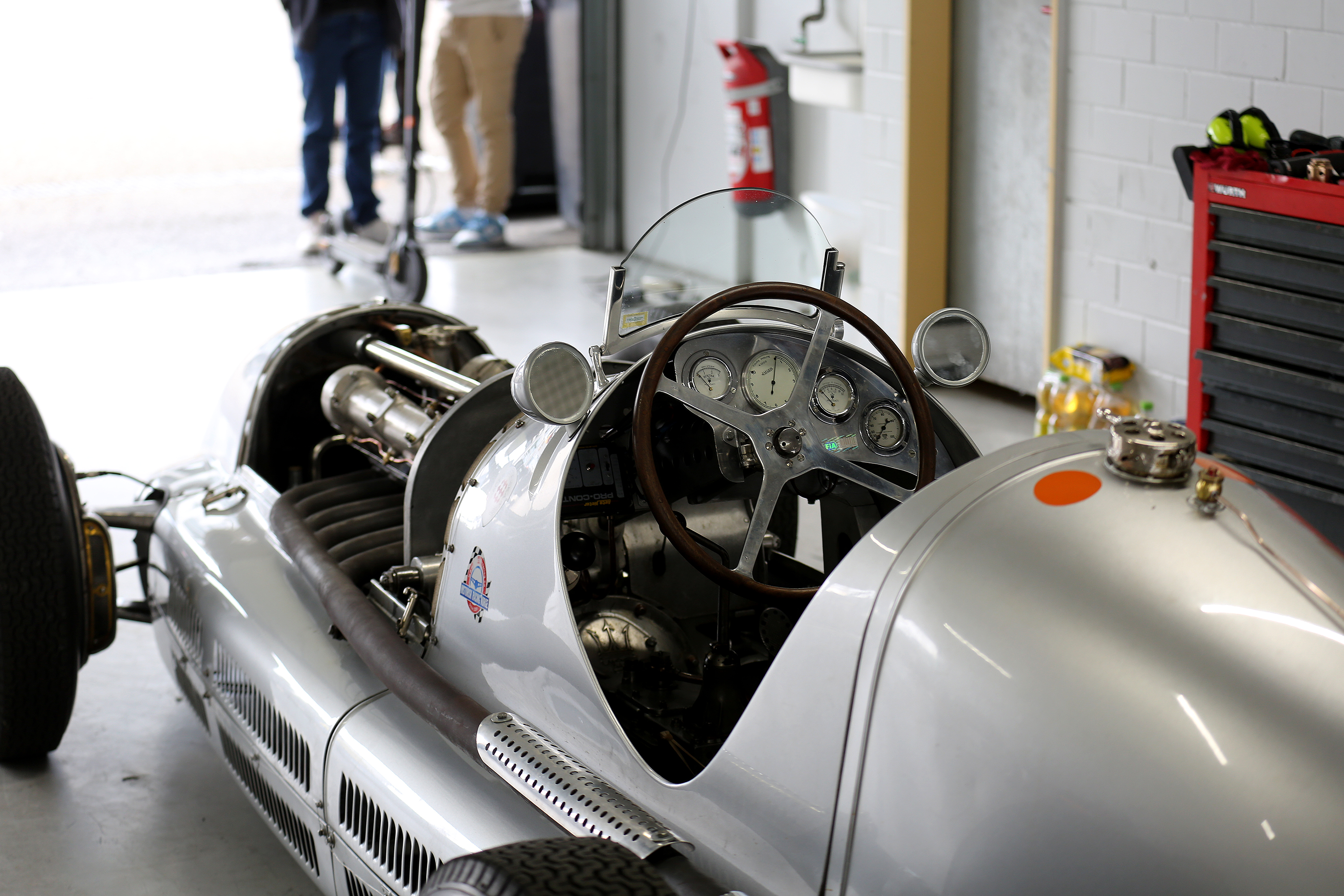

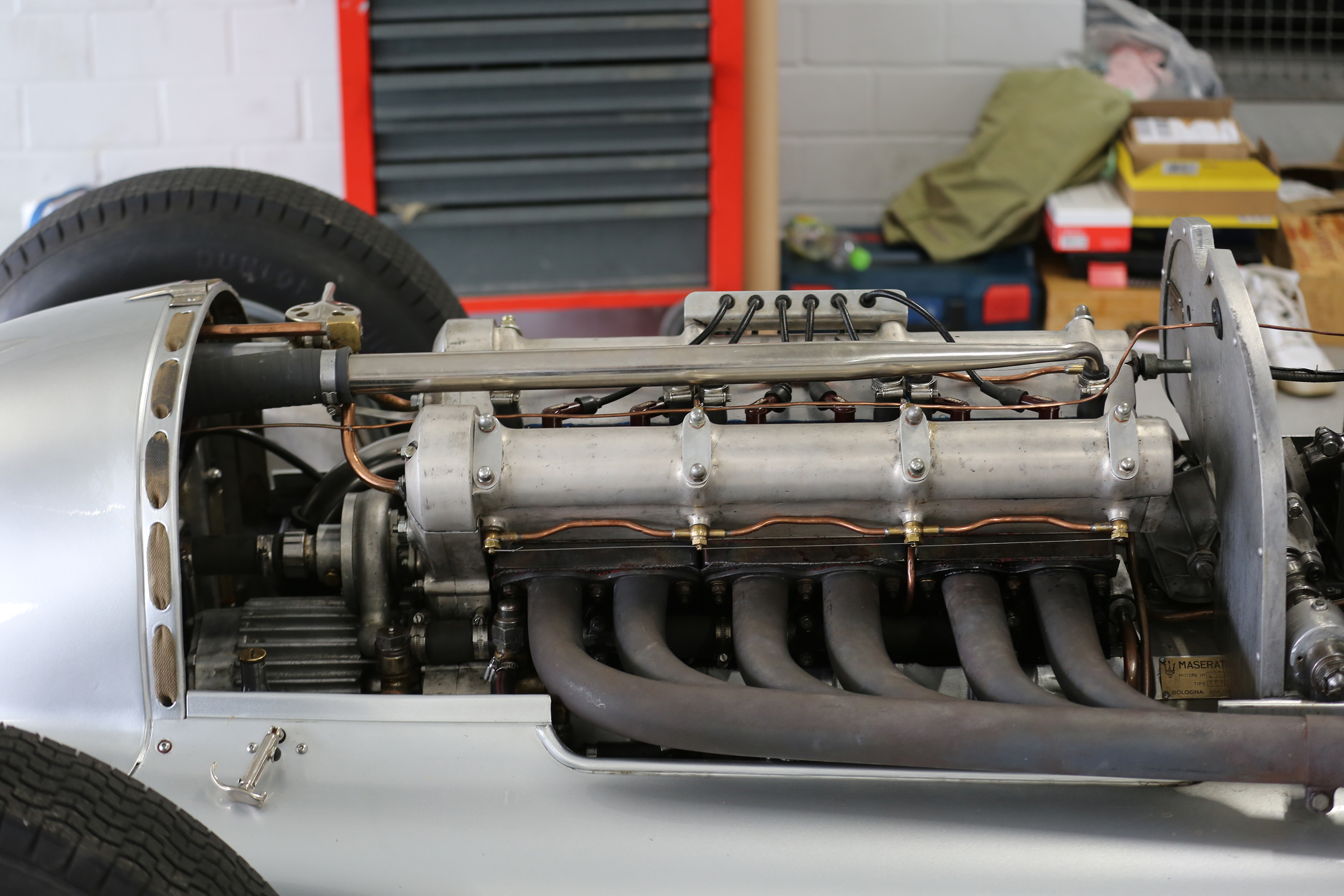

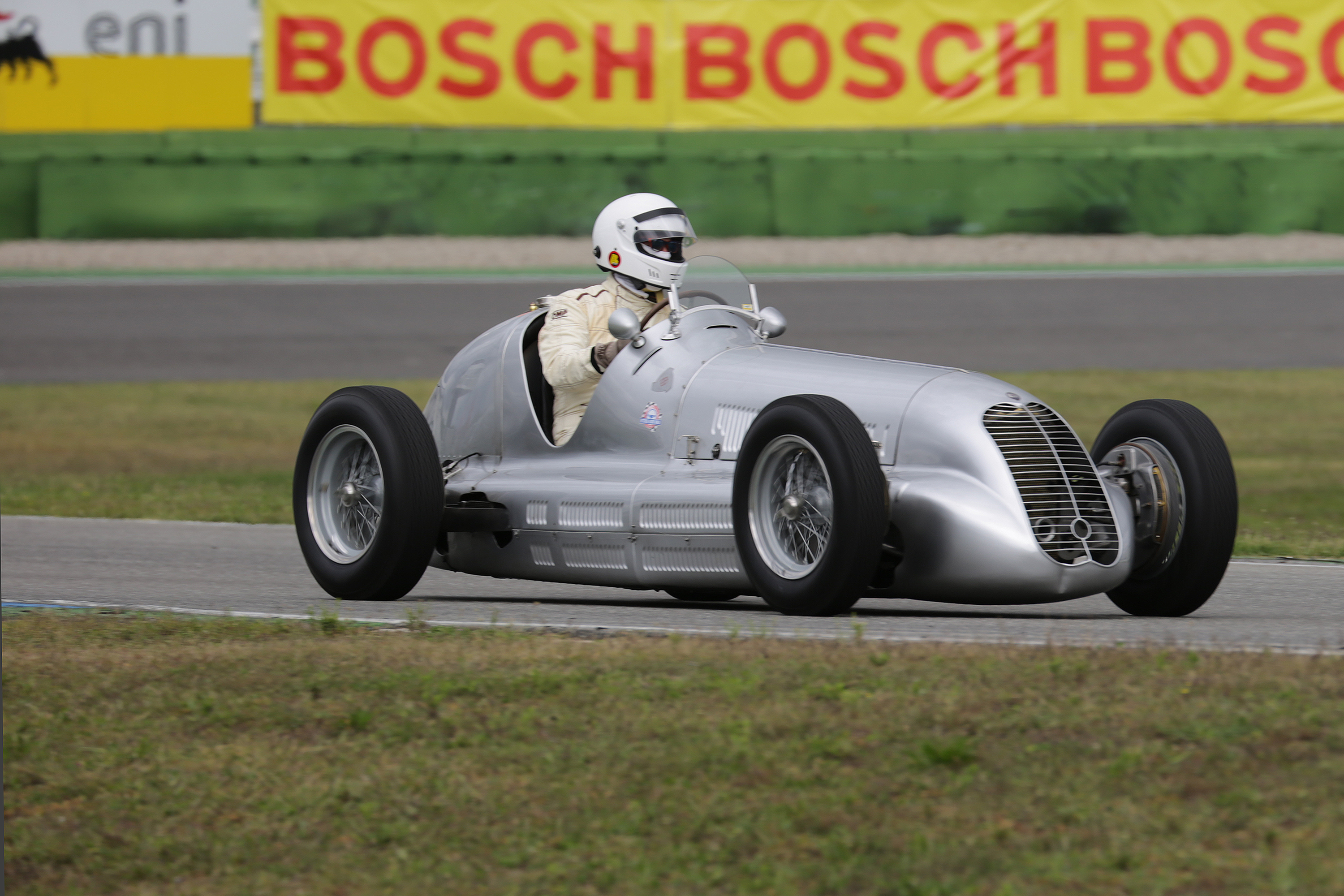

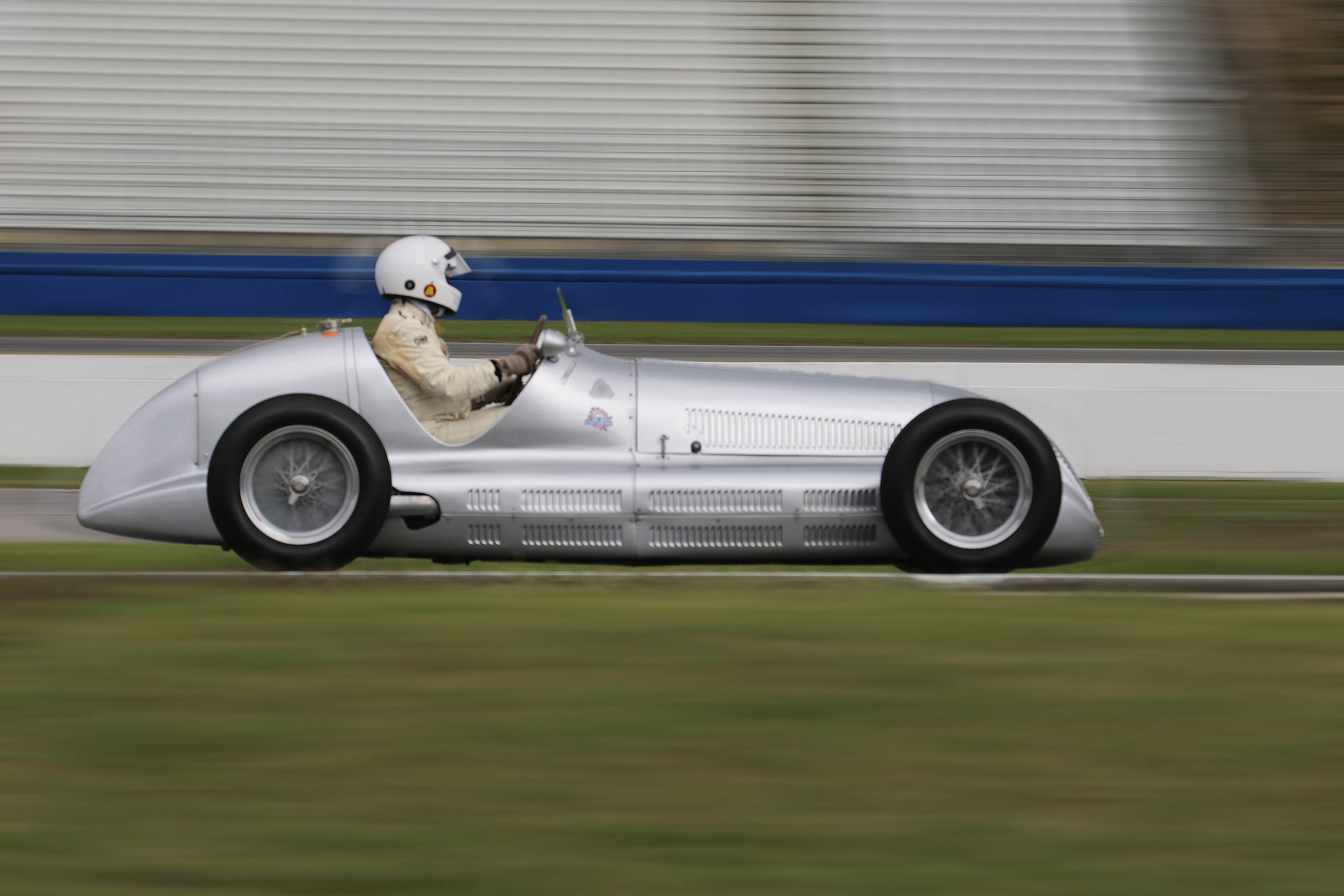

== 8CTF ==
The 8CTF was a modified 6CM, with a supercharged 3L 365 hp engine in an attempt to compete with the all-conquering Mercedes and Auto Union cars. The chassis was modified and lengthened to fit the bigger engine. During the 1938 Donington Grand Prix, Rudolf Uhlenhaut, the technical director of the Mercedes racing department checked out an 8CTF entered by Luigi Villoresi for this race. He was so impressed with the car that he remarked that if the Mercedes team had prepared the 8CTF, it could have won the race against Mercedes and Auto Unions.
