= Kobayashi =

Kobayashi (Japanese: 小林, lit. 'small woods') is the 8th most common Japanese surname. A less common variant is 古林. Notable people with the surname include:

== Arts ==
=== Film, television, theater and music ===
- Ai Kobayashi (小林 愛; born 1973), Japanese actress and voice actress
- Akiji Kobayashi (小林 昭二; 1930–1996), Japanese actor
- Akira Kobayashi (小林 旭; born 1938), Japanese actor
- Chiaki Kobayashi (小林 千晃; born 1994), Japanese voice actor
- Chikahiro Kobayashi (小林 親弘; born 1983), Japanese voice actor
- Haru Kobayashi (小林 ハル; 1900–2005), Japanese musician
- Izumi Kobayashi (小林 泉美; born 1957), Japanese musician
- Katsuya Kobayashi (小林 且弥; born 1981), Japanese actor
- Kei Kobayashi (小林 希唯; born 1976), Japanese voice actress
- Keiju Kobayashi (小林 桂樹; 1923–2010), Japanese actor
- Kendo Kobayashi (ケンドーコバヤシ; born 1972), Japanese comedian and actor
- Kentarō Kobayashi (小林 賢太郎; born 1973), Japanese comedian, actor, dramaturge, theatre director and manga artist
- Kiyoshi Kobayashi (小林 清志; 1933–2022), Japanese actor, voice actor and narrator
- Masaki Kobayashi (小林 正樹; 1916–1996), Japanese film director
- Michitaka Kobayashi (小林 通孝; born 1955), Japanese voice actor
- Naoki Kobayashi (小林 直己; born 1984), Japanese dancer and actor
- Nenji Kobayashi (小林 稔侍; born 1941), Japanese actor
- Ryoko Kobayashi (小林 涼子; born 1989), Japanese actress
- Satomi Kobayashi (小林 聡美; born 1965), Japanese actress
- Sayaka Kobayashi (小林 さやか; born 1970), Japanese actress and voice actress
- Seidō Kobayashi (小林 正道; born 1944), Japanese musician
- Seiran Kobayashi (小林 星蘭; born 2004), Japanese actress
- Shigeo Kobayashi (小林 成男; born 1970), Japanese actor
- Yasuhiro Kobayashi (小林 靖宏; born 1959), Japanese musician
- Yui Kobayashi (小林 由依; born 1999), Japanese singer and model
- Yukiko Kobayashi (小林 夕岐子; born 1946), Japanese actress
- Yuko Kobayashi (小林 優子; born 1961), Japanese voice actress
- Yumiko Kobayashi (小林 由美子; born 1979), Japanese voice actress
- Yūsuke Kobayashi (小林 裕介; born 1985), Japanese voice actor

=== Literature ===
- Audrey Kobayashi (born 1951), Canadian geographer and writer
- Hideo Kobayashi (小林 秀雄; 1902–1983), Japanese writer and literary critic
- Katsuyo Kobayashi (小林 カツ代; 1937–2014), Japanese chef and food writer
- Kobayashi Issa (小林 一茶; 1763–1828), Japanese poet
- Takiji Kobayashi (小林 多喜二; 1903–1933), Japanese writer and communist
- Tamai Kobayashi (born 1966), Canadian writer
- Yasuko Kobayashi (小林 靖子; born 1965), Japanese screenwriter
- Yasumi Kobayashi (小林 泰三; born 1962), Japanese writer

=== Music ===
- Aika Kobayashi (小林 愛香; born 1993), Japanese singer and voice actress
- Aimi Kobayashi (小林 愛実; born 1995), Japanese classical pianist
- Chie Kobayashi (小林 千絵; born 1963), Japanese actress and singer
- Hana Kobayashi (born 1982), Venezuelan singer
- Kaori Kobayashi (小林 香織; born 1981), Japanese jazz saxophonist and flautist
- Key Kobayashi (小林 啓, Kobayashi Kei), Japanese music producer, better known as Kobametal
- Megumi Kobayashi (小林 恵; born 1977), Japanese model, actress and singer
- Ron Kobayashi, American jazz pianist
- Sachiko Kobayashi (小林 幸子; born 1953), Japanese enka singer and voice actress
- Sanae Kobayashi (小林 沙苗; born 1980), Japanese voice actress and singer
- Saori Kobayashi (小林 早織), Japanese video game composer and pianist
- Satoru Kobayashi (disambiguation), multiple people
- Sumio Kobayashi (小林 純生; born 1982), Japanese classical composer
- Takeshi Kobayashi (小林 武史; born 1959), Japanese keyboardist, lyricist, composer, arranger and record producer
- Yo Kobayashi (小林 洋; born 1981), Japanese roboticist
- Yū Kobayashi (小林 ゆう; born 1982), Japanese voice actress and singer

=== Other artists ===
- Kobayashi Eitaku (小林 永濯; 1843–1890), Japanese artist
- Kobayashi Kiyochika (小林 清親; 1847–1915), Japanese ukiyo-e painter and printmaker
- Kokei Kobayashi (小林 古径; 1883–1957), Japanese painter
- Jin Kobayashi (小林 尽; born 1977), Japanese manga artist
- Kobayashi Keisei (小林 敬生; born 1944), Japanese artist
- Kunio Kobayashi (bonsai artist) (小林 國雄 born 1948), Japanese bonsai artist
- Meison Kobayashi (小林 鳴村; 1889–?), Japanese photographer
- Motofumi Kobayashi (小林 源文; born 1951), Japanese manga artist
- Naomi Kobayashi (小林 尚美; born 1945), Japanese artist
- Norio Kobayashi (小林 のりお; born 1952), Japanese photographer
- Shinichiro Kobayashi (小林 伸一郎), Japanese photographer
- Robert Kobayashi (1925–2015), American artist
- Tomoki Kobayashi (小林 智樹), Japanese anime director
- Toshihiko Kobayashi (小林 俊彦), Japanese manga artist
- Tsuneo Kobayashi (小林 常夫; born 1965), Japanese anime director
- Yoshinori Kobayashi (小林 善範; born 1953), Japanese manga artist
- Yūshi Kobayashi (小林 祐史; 1898–1988), Japanese photographer

== Military ==
- Kobayashi Torasaburō (小林 虎三郎; 1828–1877), Japanese samurai
- Masami Kobayashi (小林 仁; 1890–1977), Imperial Japanese Navy admiral
- Seizō Kobayashi (小林 躋造; 1877–1962), Imperial Japanese Navy admiral and Governor-General of Taiwan

== Politics and law ==
- Ann Kobayashi (born 1937), American politician and businesswoman
- Bert T. Kobayashi (1916–2005), Justice of the Supreme Court of Hawaii
- Bertrand Kobayashi (fl. 2010s), American politician
- Leslie E. Kobayashi (born 1957), American judge
- Kazumi Kobayashi (小林 一三; born 1936), Japanese politician, 6th Mayor of Niitsu, Niigata
- Masao Kobayashi (小林 正夫; born 1947), Japanese politician
- Mieko Kobayashi (小林 美恵子; born 1958), Japanese politician

== Scientists and engineers ==
- Albert S. Kobayashi (born 1924), American engineer and scientist
- Hisashi Kobayashi (小林 久志; 1938–2023), Japanese electrical engineer and computer scientist
- Kevin Wesley Kobayashi, American engineer
- Kiyoshi Kobayashi (professor) (小林 潔司), Japanese academic
- Makoto Kobayashi (小林 誠 born 1944), Japanese physicist
- Riki Kobayashi (1924–2013), American chemical engineer
- Shoshichi Kobayashi (小林 昭七; 1932–2012), Japanese-American mathematician
- Takao Kobayashi (小林 隆男; born 1961), Japanese amateur astronomer
- Tatsuo Kobayashi (小林 龍生; born 1951), Japanese computer scientist
- Toru Kobayashi (小林 徹), Japanese astronomer
- Toshiyuki Kobayashi (小林 俊行; born 1962), Japanese mathematician

== Sports ==
=== Baseball ===
- Masahide Kobayashi (小林 雅英; born 1974), Japanese baseball player
- Ryokan Kobayashi (小林 亮寛; born 1979), Japanese baseball player
- Seiji Kobayashi (小林 誠司; born 1989), Japanese baseball player
- Shigeru Kobayashi (小林 繁; 1952–2010), Japanese baseball player

=== Football (soccer) ===
- Daigo Kobayashi (小林 大悟; born 1983), Japanese footballer
- George Kobayashi (小林 ジョージ; born 1947), Japanese footballer
- Hiroki Kobayashi (小林 弘記; born 1977), Japanese footballer
- Hiroki Kobayashi (footballer, born 1992), Japanese footballer
- Jun Kobayashi (小林 洵; born 1999), Japanese footballer
- Kan Kobayashi (小林 幹; born 1999), Japanese footballer
- Masamitsu Kobayashi (小林 成光; born 1978), Japanese footballer
- Minoru Kobayashi (小林 稔; born 1976), Japanese footballer
- Paulinho Kobayashi (born 1970), Brazilian footballer
- Rikako Kobayashi (小林 里歌子; born 1997), Japanese women's footballer
- Riku Kobayashi (小林 里駆; born 2001), Japanese footballer
- Ryo Kobayashi (小林 亮; born 1982), Japanese footballer
- Ryota Kobayashi (小林 亮太; born 1988), Japanese footballer
- Seigo Kobayashi (小林 成豪; born 1994), Japanese footballer
- Shinji Kobayashi (小林 伸二; born 1960), Japanese footballer and manager
- Shota Kobayashi (古林 将太; born 1991), Japanese footballer
- Tadao Kobayashi (小林 忠生; born 1930), Japanese footballer and manager
- Tatsuki Kobayashi (小林 竜樹; born 1985), Japanese footballer
- Teruaki Kobayashi (小林 久晃; born 1979), Japanese footballer
- Yasutaka Kobayashi (小林 康剛; born 1980), Japanese footballer
- Yayoi Kobayashi (小林 弥生; born 1981), Japanese women's footballer
- Yoshiyuki Kobayashi (小林 慶行; born 1978), Japanese footballer
- Yōsuke Kobayashi (小林 陽介; born 1983), Japanese footballer
- Yu Kobayashi (footballer) (小林 悠; born 1987), Japanese footballer
- Yugo Kobayashi (footballer) (born 1991), Japanese footballer
- Yuki Kobayashi (football, born 2000), Japanese footballer
- Yuzo Kobayashi (小林 祐三; born 1985), Japanese footballer

=== Mind sports ===
- Izumi Kobayashi (小林 泉美; born 1977), Japanese Go player
- Kenji Kobayashi (小林 健二; born 1957), Japanese shogi player
- Koichi Kobayashi (小林 光一; born 1952), Japanese Go player
- Reiko Kobayashi (Go player) (小林 禮子; 1939–1996), Japanese Go player

=== Winter sports ===
- Junshirō Kobayashi (小林 潤志郎; born 1991), Japanese ski jumper
- Miki Kobayashi (小林 美貴; born 1987), Japanese biathlete
- Norihito Kobayashi (小林 範仁; born 1982), Japanese Nordic combined skier
- Reiko Kobayashi (小林 れい子; born 1961), Japanese figure skater and coach
- Ryōyū Kobayashi (小林 陵侑; born 1996), Japanese ski jumper
- Ryuichi Kobayashi (小林 竜一; born 1976), Japanese bobsledder

=== Wrestling ===
- Abdullah Kobayashi (アブドーラ小林; born 1976), or Yosuke Kobayashi, Japanese professional wrestler
- Eita Kobayashi (小林 瑛太; born 1991), Japanese professional wrestler
- Kaho Kobayashi (小林 香萌; born 1992), Japanese professional wrestler
- Kenta Kobayashi (小林 健太; born 1981), also known as Hideo Itami, Japanese professional wrestler
- Kuniaki Kobayashi (小林 邦昭; 1956–2024), Japanese professional wrestler
- Takeshi Kobayashi (wrestler) (小林 武; born 1948), Japanese sport wrestler

=== Other athletes ===
- Chisa Kobayashi (小林 千紗; born 1987), Japanese synchronized swimmer
- Celes Kobayashi (born 1974), Japanese boxer
- Daisuke Kobayashi (小林 大祐; born 1987), Japanese basketball player
- Dawn Kobayashi (born 1971), Jamaican sport shooter
- Etsuko Kobayashi (born 1992), Japanese cricketer
- Fujio Kobayashi (小林 富士夫; born 1944), Japanese golfer
- Fumikazu Kobayashi (小林 史和; born 1978), Japanese middle-distance runner
- Hideo Kobayashi (canoeist) (小林 英男; born 1943), Japanese sprint canoeist
- Hiroko Kobayashi (小林 弘子; born 1970), Japanese slalom canoeist
- Kai Kobayashi (小林 快; born 1993), Japanese racewalker
- Kamui Kobayashi (小林 可夢偉; born 1986), racing driver
- Kazuo Kobayashi (小林 一男; 1908–?), Japanese diver
- Kenya Kobayashi (小林 研也; born 1983), Japanese gymnast
- Kunio Kobayashi (karateka) (小林 國雄 born 1967), Japanese karateka
- Maki Kobayashi (小林 眞樹; born 1965), Japanese rower
- Marino Kobayashi (小林 海; born 1994), Japanese cyclist
- Masanori Kobayashi (小林 正則; born 1976), Japanese golfer
- Misaki Kobayashi (小林 海咲; born 1990), Japanese squash player
- Miwako Kobayashi (小林 美和子; born 1952), Japanese swimmer
- Nobuaki Kobayashi (小林 伸明; 1942–2019), Japanese three-cushion billiards player
- Royal Kobayashi (1949–2020), Japanese boxer
- Ryosei Kobayashi (born 1994), Japanese squash player
- Susumu Kobayashi (小林 晋; born 1973), Japanese sport shooter
- Takako Kobayashi (小林 貴子; born 1968), Japanese judoka
- Takeru Kobayashi (小林 尊; born 1978), Japanese competitive eater
- Yasuo Kobayashi (小林 保雄; born 1936), Japanese aikidoka
- Yoshimi Kobayashi (小林 良美; born 1968), Japanese softball player
- Yugo Kobayashi (小林 優吾; born 1995), Japanese badminton player
- Yuka Kobayashi (小林 優香; born 1994), Japanese cyclist
- Yuriko Kobayashi (小林 祐梨子; born 1988), Japanese middle- and long-distance runner
- Yuta Kobayashi (小林 祐太; born 1987), Japanese basketball player

== Others ==
- Emi Kobayashi (小林 恵美; born 1983), Japanese gravure idol
- Hannah Kobayashi (born 1994), American missing person
- Hitomi Kobayashi (小林 ひとみ; born 1965), Japanese AV idol
- Ichizō Kobayashi (小林 一三; 1873–1957), Japanese industrialist
- Kana Kobayashi (小林 香菜; born 1991), Japanese idol
- Keiichiro Kobayashi (小林 慶一郎; born 1966), Japanese economist
- Ken Kobayashi (小林 健; born 1949), Japanese businessman
- Ken-Ichiro Kobayashi (小林 研一郎; born 1940), Japanese conductor and composer
- Sanzaburo Kobayashi (小林 参三郎, 1863–1926), Japanese surgeon
- Sosaku Kobayashi (小林 宗作; 1863–1963), Japanese educator
- Maya Kobayashi (小林 麻耶; born 1979), Japanese journalist
- Yotaro Kobayashi (小林 陽太郎; 1933–2015), Japanese businessman
- Yumi Kobayashi (小林 優美; born 1988), Japanese fashion model

== Fictional characters ==
- Kobayashi (小林), a character in the manga series The Law of Ueki
- Kobayashi (小林), the protagonist in the manga series Miss Kobayashi's Dragon Maid
- Kobayashi, a character in the film The Usual Suspects
- Akane Kobayashi (小林 あかね), a character in the manga series Doki Doki School Hours
- Amiko Kobayashi, a character in Marvel Comics
- Atari Kobayashi, a character in the film Isle of Dogs
- Daigo Kobayashi, a character in the film Departures
- Hayato Kobayashi (ハヤト・コバヤシ), a character in the anime series Mobile Suit Gundam
- Hitomonji Kobayashi (小林 一文字), a character in the manga series Cheeky Angel
- Hatoko Kobayashi (小林 鳩子) and Kotaro Kobayashi (小林 虎太郎), characters in the manga series Angelic Layer
- Koji Kobayashi, a character in the film Godzilla Raids Again
- Masafumi Kobayashi, a character in the film Noroi: The Curse
- Matcha Kobayashi (小林 抹茶), a character in the media franchise Project 575
- Rin Kobayashi (小林 輪), a character in the manga series Please Save My Earth
- Sanpeita Kobayashi (小林 三平太), protagonist of the manga series Kemeko Deluxe!
- Sashi Kobayashi, a character in the Disney XD animated series Penn Zero: Part-Time Hero
- Sumiko Kobayashi (小林 澄子), a character in the manga series Case Closed
- Tamami Kobayashi (小林 玉美) a side character in JoJo's Bizarre Adventure: Diamond is Unbreakable
- Washu Kobayashi (小林 鷲羽), also known as Washu Hakubi, a character in Tenchi Muyō! media

== See also ==
- Akiko Kobayashi (disambiguation), multiple people
- Fumiaki Kobayashi (disambiguation), multiple people
- Hideaki Kobayashi (disambiguation), multiple people
- Hirokazu Kobayashi (disambiguation), multiple people
- Hiromi Kobayashi (disambiguation), multiple people
- Hiroshi Kobayashi (disambiguation), multiple people
- Hiroyuki Kobayashi (disambiguation), multiple people
- Kaoru Kobayashi (disambiguation), multiple people
- Kōji Kobayashi (disambiguation), multiple people
- Makoto Kobayashi (disambiguation), multiple people
- Mao Kobayashi (disambiguation), multiple people
- Masahiro Kobayashi (disambiguation), multiple people
- Masato Kobayashi (disambiguation), multiple people
- Miyuki Kobayashi (disambiguation), multiple people
- Osamu Kobayashi (disambiguation), multiple people
- Takashi Kobayashi (disambiguation), multiple people
- Yuki Kobayashi (disambiguation), multiple people
- Yūsuke Kobayashi (disambiguation), multiple people
- Yutaka Kobayashi (disambiguation), multiple people
