= The Le Van Family Musicians =

Family of violinists

The Le Van Family Musicians are a family of vocalists, pianists, and violinists who perform in a variety of styles and genres of music. Originally from Alsace, France, they moved to America in 2003.

The Le Van Family Musicians group is composed of four musicians, Eric Le Van, his daughters Sarah and Solene, and his son Sean. Eric plays the piano. Sarah plays violin and sings, and sometimes performs on a minstrel harp. Solene plays violin and sings, and she can also performs on the guitar and the mandolin. Sean plays keyboards and he also sings.

The Le Vans have performed as guest soloists of the Cypress Pops Orchestra and of the Celeste Guild of the Pacific Symphony Orchestra, the opening concert of the 26th Jazz Festival in Munster (France), as well as in Carnegie Hall, Steinway Hall, Beverly Hilton (Los Angeles), La Mirada Theatre for the Performing Arts, Steamers Jazz Club, the Irvine Israel Expo, Cox Auditorium (Illinois), MGM Grand (Las Vegas), Mission Viejo Cultural Arts series, Livingston Community Concerts (Texas), among others. They were also invited to perform in the 3rd International Vianden Music Festival and Academy in Luxembourg. Recently, they appeared in the Anaheim Performing Arts Center gala concert alongside legendary performer Debbie Reynolds. Noted musicians have shared the stage with them, such as Berisford "Shep" Shepherd, Michel Hausser, Mourad Benhammou, Michael Le Van, Llew Matthews, Ron Kobayashi, Bruce Lett and Tim Pleasant.

They were selected to participate in NBC's America's Got Talent and featured in the French magazine Femme Actuelle as well as on France 3. Sarah was the first recipient of the Blanche Nissim Memorial Fund Award from the La Mirada Symphony Association for exceptionally talented young musicians at the age of 8. Among Solene's awards are a First Place in the Last Vegas USA World Showcase (2004), First Place on America's Most Talented Kids (2005), and Gold Medal at the American Association for the Development of the Gifted and Talented (AADGT) "Passion of Music" Competition (2010), at which her brother Sean took the Silver Medal.
