= 史明 =

史明, meaning 'history, brilliant', may refer to:

- Fumiaki, a masculine Japanese given name
- Su Beng (1918–2019), Taiwanese revolutionary, historian, and political activist
