= Fumiaki =

- Pronunciation: [ɸɯmiaki]
- Gender: Male

Origin
- Origin: Japanese
- Meaning: Different meanings depending on the kanji used

Japanese name
- Kanji: 史明; 文明; 文昭; 文彬
- Hiragana: ふみあき
Transcriptions
- Romanization: Fumiaki

Fumiaki (written: 文明, 文昭 or 史明) is a masculine Japanese given name. Notable people with the name include:

- Fumiaki Aoshima (青嶋 文明; born 1968), Japanese footballer
- Fumiaki Kobayashi (disambiguation), multiple people
- Fumiaki Matsumoto (松本 文明; born 1949), Japanese politician
- Fumiaki Miyamoto (宮本 文昭; born 1949), Japanese classical oboist and conductor
- Fumiaki Nakamura (中村 文昭; born 1981), Japanese footballer
- Fumiaki Shishida (志々田 文明; born 1949), Japanese aikidoka
- Fumiaki Tanaka (田中 史明; born 1985), Japanese rugby union player
- Fumiaki Uto (宇都 文昭), Japanese astronomer
