= Hiroshi Kobayashi =

Hiroshi Kobayashi may refer to:

- Hiroshi Kobayashi (boxer) (born 1944), Japanese boxer
- Hiroshi Kobayashi, chemist, synthesised Kobayashi's anion
- Hiroshi Kobayashi (footballer) (born 1959), Japanese football player and manager
- Hiroshi Kobayashi (shogi, born 1962), Japanese shogi player
- Hiroshi Kobayashi (shogi, born 1976), Japanese shogi player
- Hiroshi Kobayashi (baseball) (born 1970), Japanese pitcher
