= Tsuchiya Koitsu =

Japanese artist (1870–1949)

Tsuchiya Kōitsu
- 土屋光逸
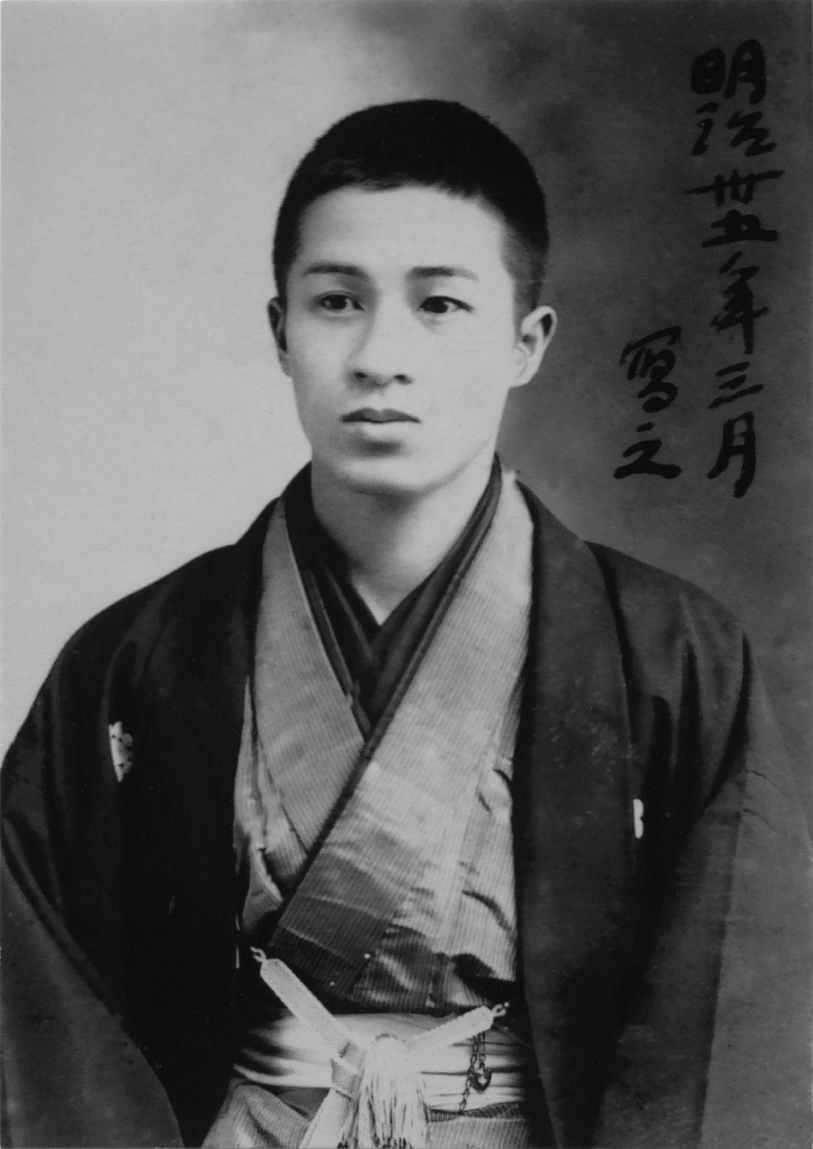
- Kōitsu in 1902
- Born: Tsuchiya Koichi; September 23, 1870; Hamamatsu, Shizuoka, Japan
- Died: November 13, 1949 (aged 79); Chigasaki, Kanagawa, Japan
- Occupation: Woodblock printing artist
- Movement: Ukiyo-e

Tsuchiya Kōitsu (Japanese: 土屋光逸) was a Japanese artist in the Shin-hanga movement. He trained under the ukiyo-e master Kobayashi Kiyochika for 19 years, and initially focused on works depicting scenes from the First Sino-Japanese War. In 1931, at the age of 60, he began work for Shōzaburō Watanabe and his art publishing establishment which also published the work of artists like Kawase Hasui and Yoshida Hiroshi. His later work incorporated light effects to increase the emotional impact of his art.

== Biography ==
Tsuchiya Koitsu was born on September 23, 1870, in Hamamatsu, Shizuoka, Japan. His birth name was either Koichi or Sahei. He moved to Tokyo at age 15. He first attempted to become an apprentice at a Buddhist temple, but soon after, on a priest's recommendation, took up an apprenticeship at the Matsuzaki Shumeidō engraving studio, closely associated as an engraver with Kiyochika Kobayashi, to whom he was soon introduced and under whom he then studied. He worked for Kiyochika for 19 years and lived in his house, improving his skills in woodblock printing, lithography and illustration, and developing his own kosenga technique for landscapes.

During 1894–95 he drew several nisshin sensō-e (prints of the First Sino-Japanese War), working with the hanmoto Takekawa Seikichi on two triptych series in 1895; he also produced several lithographic prints with Tokyo Shoseidō from around 1898 to 1904, and one further Sino-Japanese War print for the hanmoto Inoue Kichijirō, before developing his skill with dramatic light effects, learned from Kiyochika.

He continued working intensively until 1905, when a bout of pleurisy, shortly after his first marriage, forced him to give up lithography; from 1905 until around 1930 he earned his living painting kakemono-e for the Chinese market under the publisher Shōbidō Tanaka. His first wife died in 1911; he later married Suzuki Masu, whom he had met in Chigasaki while being treated for pleurisy, and in 1922 moved to Chigasaki, his second wife's hometown, where he lived for the rest of his life. Misfortune struck again when Masu died of complications from childbirth, after which care of their daughter fell to her younger sister, Toyo, whom Koitsu married in 1924, the year after the Great Kantō earthquake.

Koitsu published through the Watanabe publishing house after Watanabe and Koitsu met at an exhibition commemorating the 17th anniversary of Kiyochika's death. His first design for Watanabe, Gion no Yozakura, initiated a series of about ten prints specialising in fūkeiga, in a style recalling both Kiyochika's work and that of fellow shin-hanga artists Kawase Hasui and Hiroshi Yoshida; as was typical of shin-hanga, Koitsu made intensive use of light effects to evoke mood and emotion, revealing his mastery of form and colour. In Gion no Yozakura this skill is visible in the glow of lanterns reflected on the pale pink cherry blossoms of Kyoto's Gion Shrine: foreground figures are lit by a rectangular lantern bearing the shrine's name, while small distant figures catch further lamplight, giving the print a delightful impression of leisure in the old capital as Koitsu saw it. He also produced prints for publishers Doi Sadaichi, Kawaguchi, Baba Nobuhiko, Tanaka Shobido, and Takemura. He worked mainly for Doi Hangaten, which continues to reprint his designs from the original blocks, and occasionally for Kawaguchi, for the Kyoto hanmoto Baba Nobuhiko, for Tanaka Shobido and for Takemura, remaining a productive designer of shin-hanga landscapes through the 1930s and 1940s. Two prints from this period stand out: Morigasaki Kaigan, made for Kawaguchi in 1932, depicts three silhouetted figures in a fishing boat in the early evening, its varied blues setting off the yellow moonlight and the orange glow of a lantern; and Yotsuya Araki Yokochō, published by Doi Sadaichi in 1935 as part of the series Tōkyō Fūkei (published between January 1931 and November 1935), shows two elegantly dressed geisha at the entrance of a teahouse and a third in silhouette at a second-floor window, its saturated, glossy colours bordering on the slightly garish and its firm key-block lines occasionally omitted, as for trees shown in mist or at dusk.

With the outbreak of the Second World War, both of Koitsu's main sources of income, kakemono exported to China and woodblock prints sold directly in the West, suffered heavily from his dependence on the export market. After the war he continued to paint until his death from complications of pneumonia on November 13, 1949, but produced no further shin-hanga.

== Gallery ==
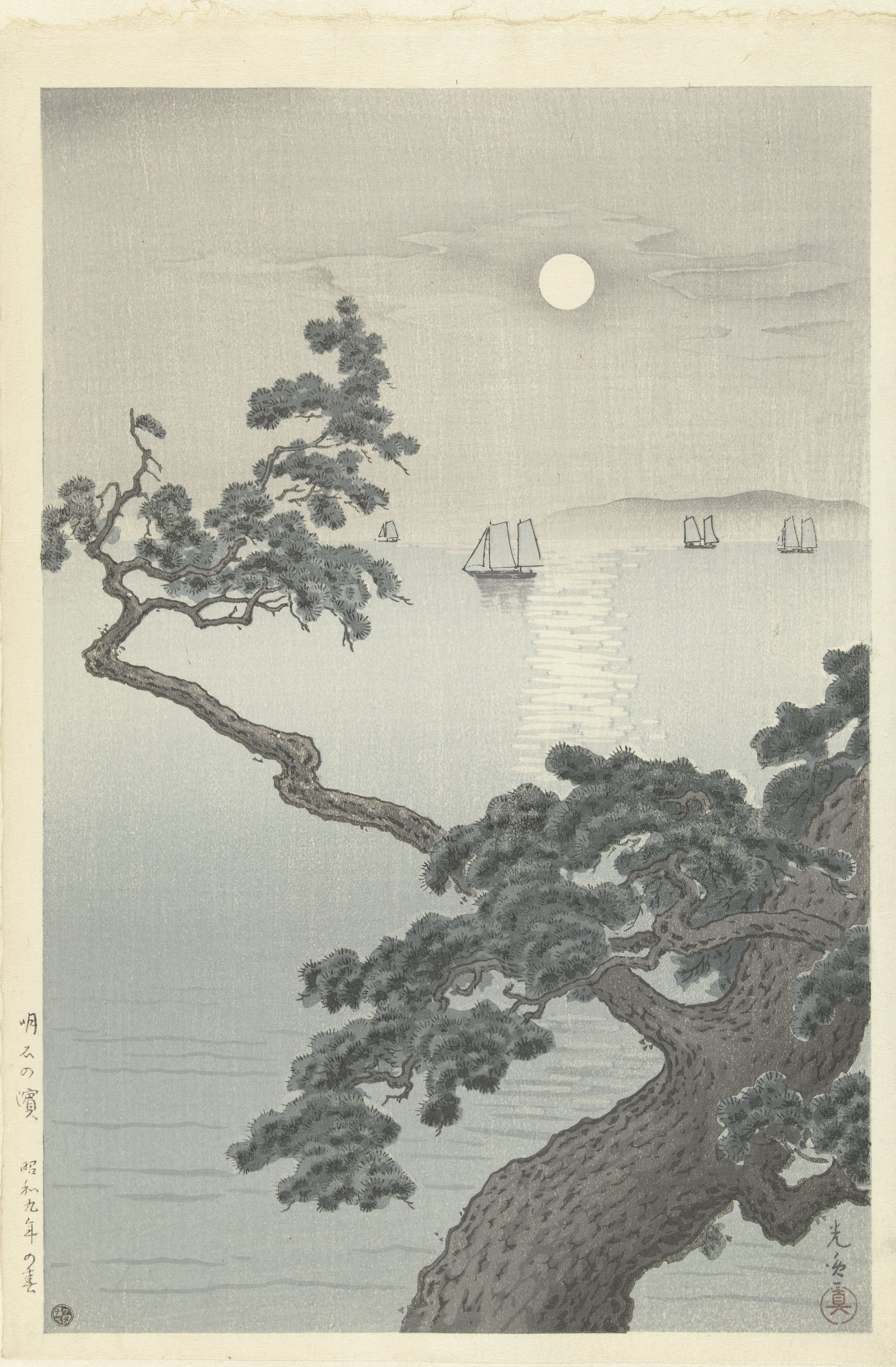
Akashi strand Akashi no hama

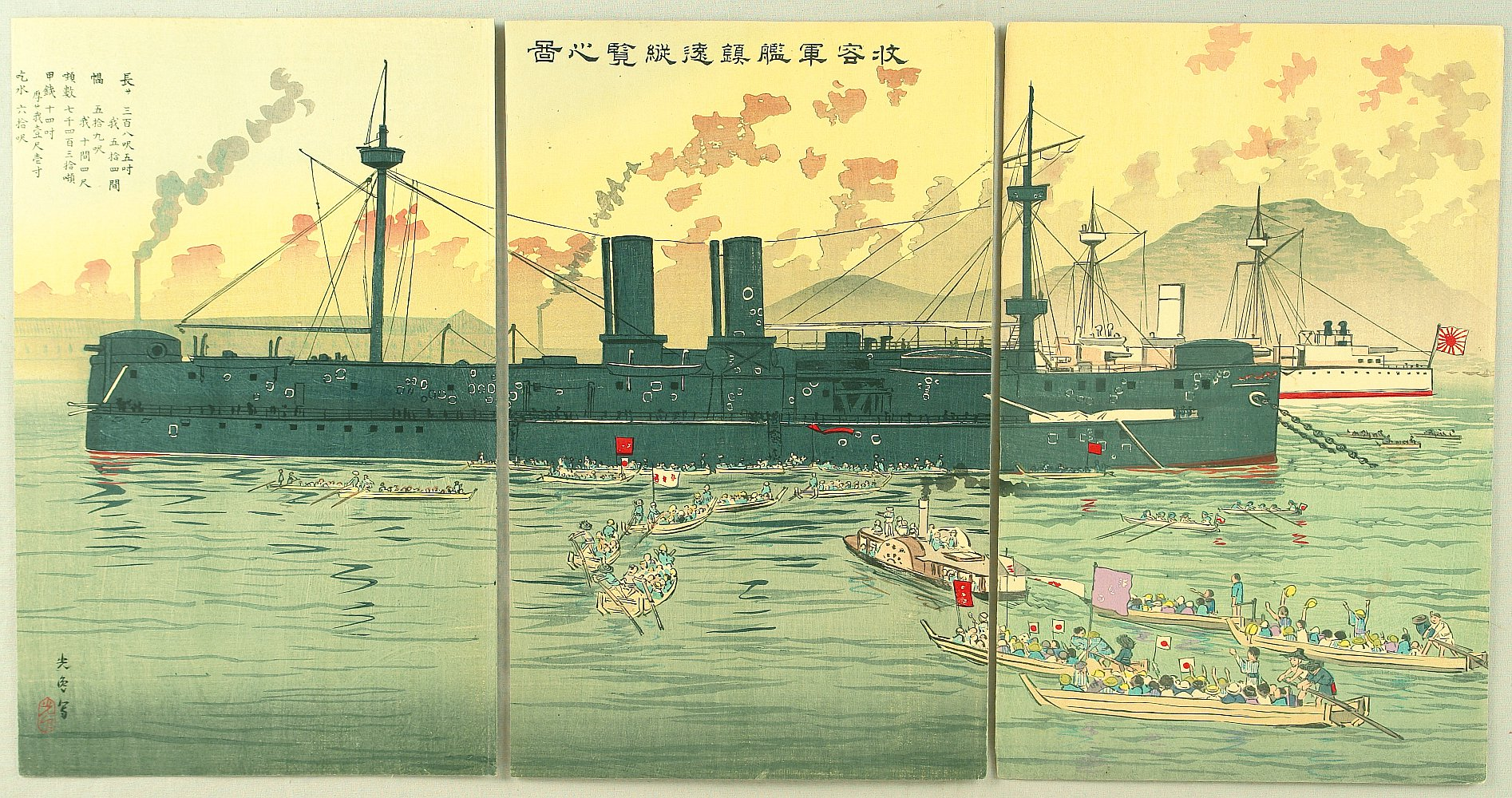
Chinese Warship Ting Yuang Visiting Japan

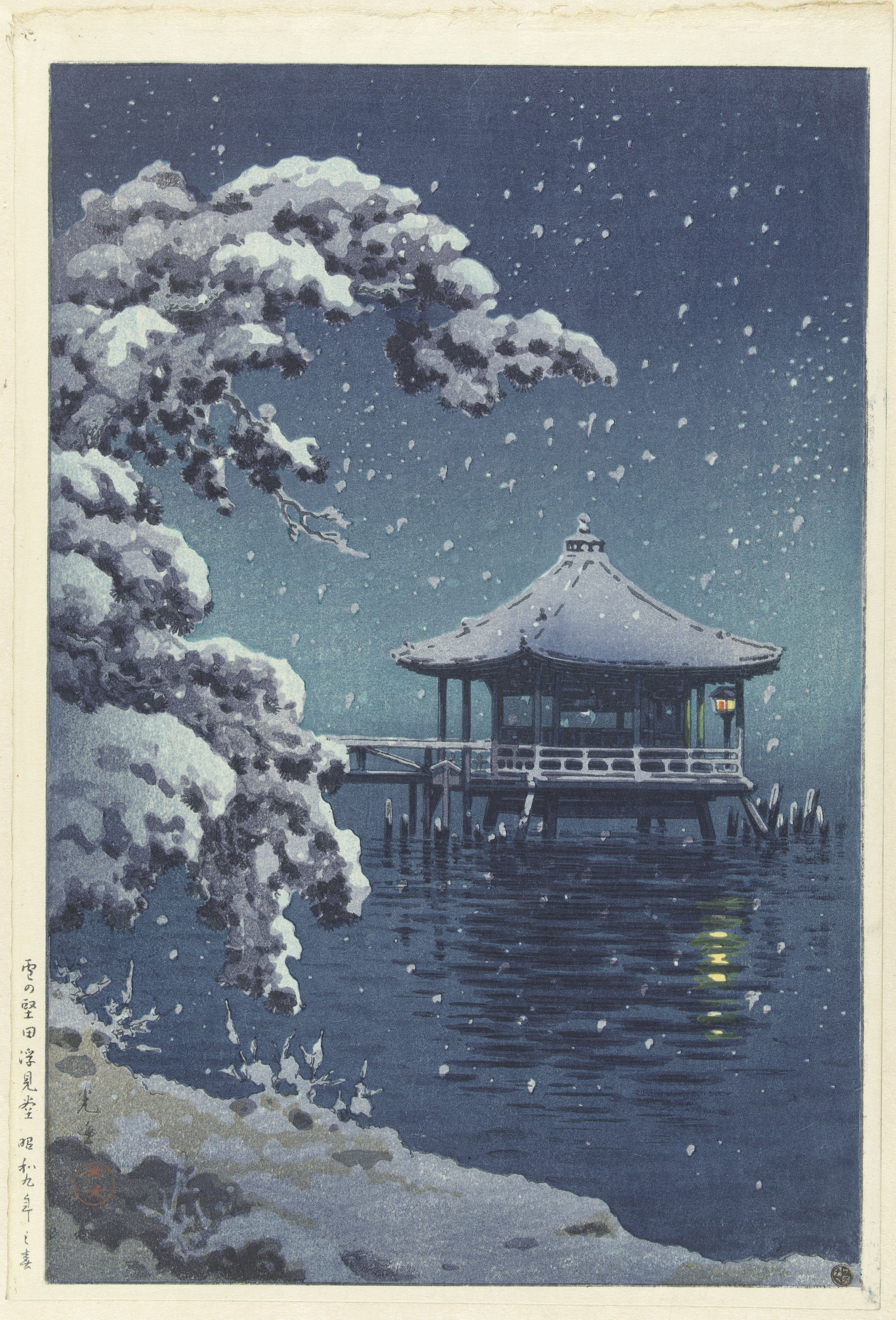
The floating pavilion at Katada in the snow Yuki no Katada Ukimido

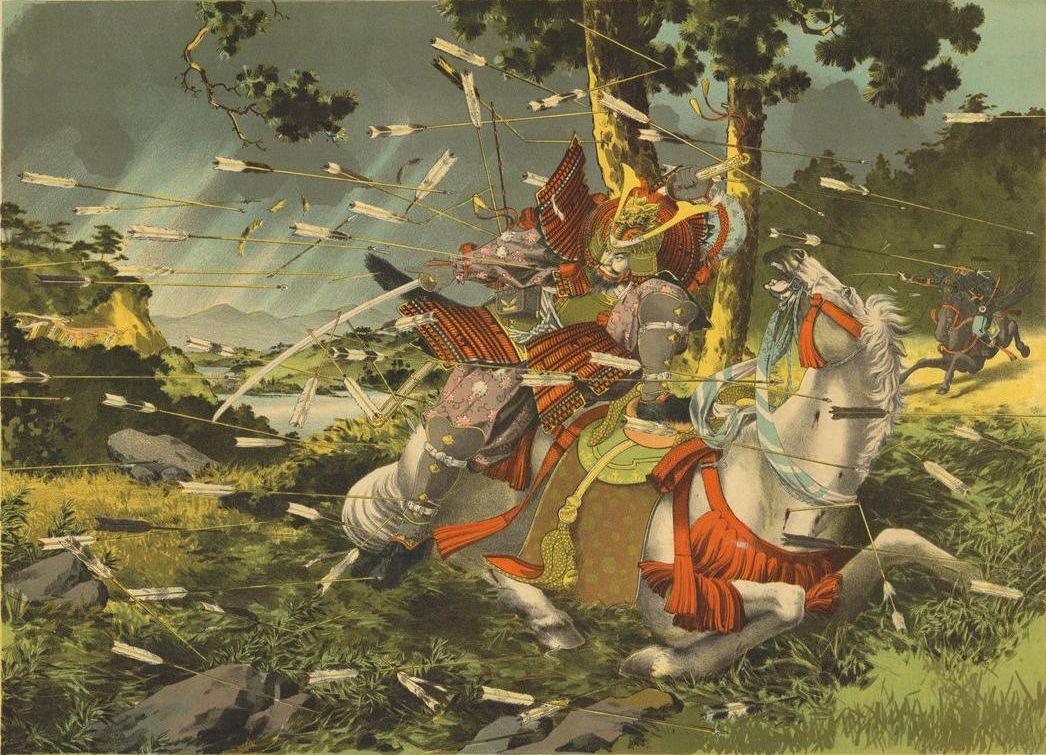
Nitta Yoshisada

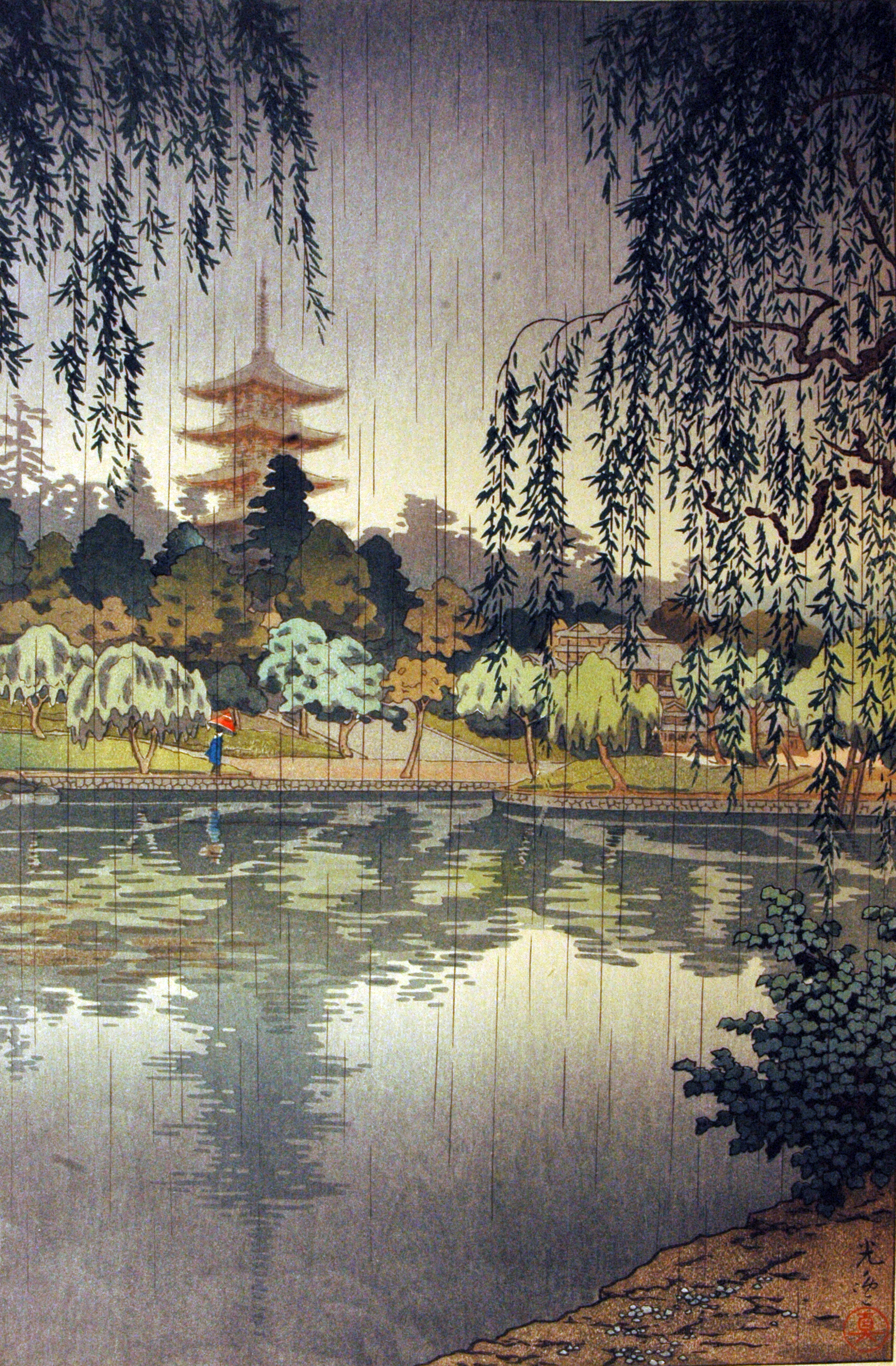
Rain at Kofukuji Temple

Sketches of Famous Places in Japan, Asakusa Kinryūzan Temple

== Further readings ==
- Helen Merritt Modern Japanese Woodblock Prints : The Early Years". Leiden: Hotei Publishing, 2001. ISBN 90-74822-38-X.
- Helen Merrit, Nanako Yamada Guide to Modern Japanese Woodblock Prints 1900-1975 University of Hawaii Press, 1995 ISBN 08-24817-32-X.
- Marco Milone La xilografia giapponese moderno contemporanea, Edizioni Clandestine, 2023 ISBN 9788865967461
- Saoya Shinora Genkouyoushi Paper. Independent Publisher, 2019 ISBN 17-03000-18-8
