= Makoto Kobayashi (disambiguation) =

Makoto Kobayashi (小林 誠, born 1944) is a Japanese physicist and Nobel laureate.

Makoto Kobayashi may also refer to:

- Makoto Kobayashi (artist) (小林 まこと, born 1958), Japanese manga artist
- Makoto Kobayashi (Olympics) (小林 實, 1935–2017), President of the Organizing Committee for the 1998 Winter Olympics and Paralympics

== See also ==
- Kobayashi (surname)
