= Shunkaen Bonsai Museum =

Museum in Tokyo

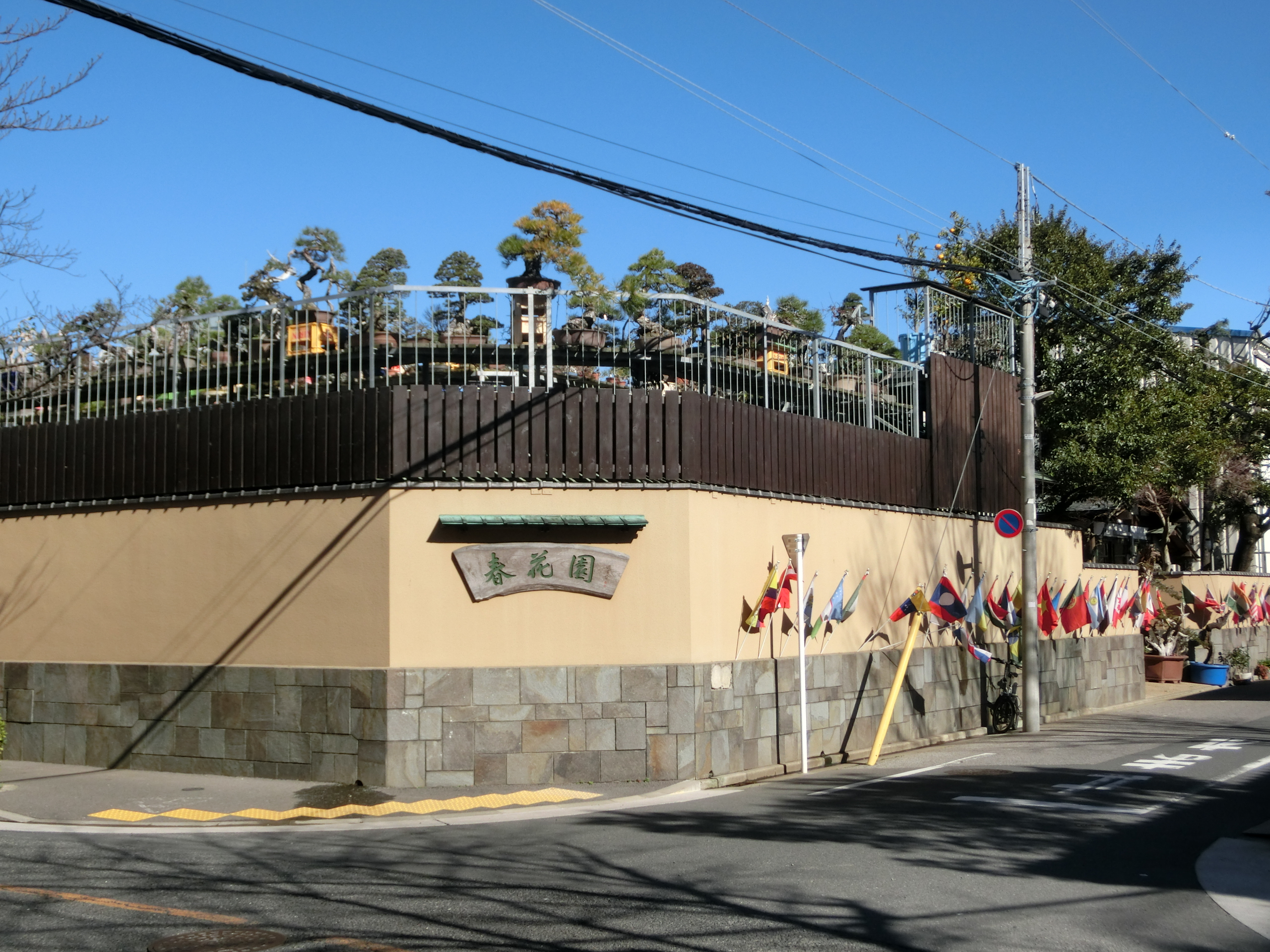
- Location: Nībori, Japan
- Website: Official website

Shunkaen Bonsai Museum (Japanese: 春花園 BONSAI 美術館; [ɕɯŋkaeɴ boɰ̃sai bidʑɯtsɯ̥kaɴ]; also transliterated as Shunka-en) is a bonsai garden in Tokyo, Japan. It was founded in 2002 by bonsai master Kunio Kobayashi.

== History ==
Kunio Kobayashi began studying bonsai in 1976. In 2002, he opened the Shunkaen Bonsai Museum in the Edogawa ward of Tokyo. It is designed as a courtyard surrounded by a traditional Japanese house. Now, the garden attracts about 10,000 foreign visitors each year.

== Collection ==
Shunkaen houses over 1,000 trees. One of the most famous of these is estimated to be 1,000 years old, and is located in front of the house. Though most of the trees are displayed in the courtyard, certain trees are displayed in traditional tokonoma alcoves inside the house. The building also houses a sizeable collection of books and antique Chinese pots and tables are also displayed.
