= Masahiro Kobayashi =

Masahiro Kobayashi is the name of:

- Masahiro Kobayashi (director) (1954–2022), Japanese film director
- Masahiro Kobayashi (actor) (born 1971), Japanese actor and voice actor

== See also ==
- Kobayashi
