= Kazuo Manabe =

Japanese shogi player (1952–2007)

- Born: February 16, 1952
- Hometown: Arakawa, Tokyo
- Nationality: Japanese
- Died: November 24, 2007 (aged 55)

Career
- Achieved professional status: April 1, 1973 (aged 21)
- Badge Number: 111
- Rank: 9 dan
- Teacher: Jirō Katō
- Tournaments won: 1
- Career record: 1023–614 (.625)
- Notable student: Hiroshi Kobayashi

Websites
- JSA profile page

Kazuo Manabe (真部 一男, Manabe Kazuo; February 16, 1952 – November 24, 2007) was a Japanese professional shogi player, ranked 9-dan.

== Promotion history ==
Manabe's promotion history is as follows:

- 1967: 6-kyū
- April 1, 1973: 4-dan
- April 1, 1976: 5-dan
- April 1, 1978: 6-dan
- April 1, 1980: 7-dan
- April 1, 1988: 8-dan
- November 24, 2007: Died as an active player
- November 24, 2007: 9-dan (conferred posthumously)

== The B-42 "Phantom" move and Masuda Special Prize ==
Toyoshima vs Manabe, 2007
☖ pieces in hand: 角

9	8	7	6	5	4	3	2	1
香				飛	金		桂	香	1
	王	金							2
	銀	桂	歩		歩	銀	歩	歩	3
歩	歩	歩		歩		歩			4
							歩		5
歩		歩	歩		歩				6
	歩	桂	銀	歩		歩		歩	7
	玉	銀		金			飛		8
香			金				桂	香	9

☗ pieces in hand: 角

Manabe is widely remembered for a move he theorized but did not play contesting his last professional game, on October 30, 2007, against Masayuki Toyoshima in a C2 ranking match. Manabe, in poor health, resigned after the 33rd move. Later that day, he confided to his colleague Hiroshi Kobayashi that he had come up with the B-42 move and believed he might have won had he played it. However, he feared this would extend the match against Toyoshima and felt he could not endure a longer game. When he was later interviewed, Toyoshima acknowledged that the move would indeed have required a long time to formulate a response. Kobayashi did not appreciate the move at the time, but his conversations with Isao Nakata about the potential move began to draw public attention.

On November 27, a wake was held for Manabe. Simultaneously, a game position identical to Toyishima's match was reached in the C2 ranking match between Yasuaki Murayama and Nobuyuki Ōuchi. Ōuchi, playing White (gote), played Manabe's ... B-42. Ōuchi would later claim he was not aware of the move's relationship to Manabe's last game. Much as Manabe had predicted, Murayama took over 110 minutes to respond to B-42. Though Murayama ultimately won the match, when Ōuchi was later told about Manabe's game with Toyoshima, he said "I should have won." Amazed at the move's recurrence during Manabe's wake, Kobayashi claimed it was a kind of miracle. The coincidence quickly became a topic of conversation in the Shogi world, and the move soon became known as the "splendid, phantom move" (幻の妙手, Maboroshi no myōshu).

The move was proposed for consideration for the then-upcoming Masuda Special Award, which was granted to Manabe posthumously in 2008.
