= Mieko Kobayashi =

Japanese politician

- 小林 美恵子

Member of the House of Councillors
- In office 7 July 2003 – 28 July 2007
- Preceded by: Hideyo Fudesaka
- Succeeded by: Multi-member district
- Constituency: National PR

Personal details
- Born: 26 August 1958 (age 68) Mie Prefecture, Japan
- Party: Communist
- Education: Osaka Kyoiku University

Mieko Kobayashi (小林 美恵子 Kobayashi Mieko) is a Japanese politician and member of the House of Councillors for the Japanese Communist Party.
