= Hiroshi Kobayashi (shogi, born 1962) =

Japanese professional shogi player

- Native name: 小林宏
- Born: December 18, 1962 (age 63)
- Hometown: Tamaki, Mie

Career
- Achieved professional status: August 3, 1984 (aged 21)
- Badge Number: 167
- Rank: 7-dan
- Retired: April 19, 2022 (aged 59)
- Teacher: Kazuo Manabe (9-dan)
- Tournaments won: 1
- Career record: 435–564 (.435)

Websites
- JSA profile page

Hiroshi Kobayashi (小林 宏, Kobayashi Hiroshi; born December 18, 1962) is a Japanese retired professional shogi player who achieved the rank of 7-dan.

== Early life and apprenticeship ==
Kobayashi was born on December 18, 1962, in Tamaki, Mie. He was accepted into the Japan Shogi Association's apprentice school as a student of shogi professional Kazuo Manabe at the rank of 6-kyū in 1978, was promoted to the rank of apprentice professional 1-dan in 1981, and obtained full professional status and the rank of 4-dan in 1983.

== Shogi professional ==
Kobayashi defeated Yasumitsu Satō to win the 11th Quick Play Young Professionals Tournament in 1992. The victory stopped Satō from winning the tournament three years in a row.

Kobayashi finished the finished 69th Meijin Class C2 league play (April 2010 – March 2011) with a record of 2 wins and 8 losses, earning a second demotion point which meant he was only one point away from automatic demotion to "Free Class" play. As a result, he declared his intention to the Japan Shogi Association to become a Free Class player as of April 2011 rather than risk automatic demotion.

Kobayashi retired from professional shogi on April 19, 2022. He retired with a career record of 435 wins and 564 losses for a winning percentage of 0.435.

=== Promotion history ===
The promotion history for Kobayashi is as follows:

- 6-kyū: 1978
- 1-dan: 1981
- 4-dan: August 3, 1983
- 5-dan: May 19, 1989
- 6-dan: November 29, 1995
- 7-dan: November 25, 2009
- Retired: April 19, 2022

=== Titles and other championships ===
Kobayashi has never appeared in a major title match, but he has won one non-title shogi championships during his career.

=== Awards and honors ===
Kobayashi received the JSA's "25 Years Service Award" in 2009 in recognition of being an active professional for twenty-five years.

== Personal life ==
Kobayashi has been an avid mountain climber since his junior high school days.
