= Yuki Kobayashi =

Yuki Kobayashi may refer to:

- Yuki Kobayashi (skier) (小林 由貴, born 1987), Japanese cross-country skier
- Yuki Kobayashi (footballer, born 1988) (小林 裕紀), Japanese footballer
- Yuki Kobayashi (footballer, born 1992) (小林 祐希), Japanese footballer
- Yuki Kobayashi (footballer, born 2000) (小林 友希), Japanese footballer
