= Kunio Kobayashi =

Japanese bonsai artist

- 小林國雄
- Pronunciation: [kobajaɕi̥ kɯɲio]
- Born: April 2, 1948 (age 78); Tokyo, Japan
- Known for: Bonsai
- Website: http://kunio-kobayashi.com/en/index.html

Kunio Kobayashi (Japanese: 小林國雄; [kobajaɕi̥ kɯɲio]; born 1948) is a Japanese bonsai artist, and the owner of the Shunkaen Bonsai Museum in Tokyo.

== Life ==
Kobayashi was born in Tokyo, Japan in 1948. His family was involved in floriculture, and he grew up working in a nursery. In 1976, at age 28, he saw a Japanese white pine bonsai in an exhibition and was inspired to study the art form. Now, over 200 apprentices and international students study under Kobayashi. He has also given lectures on bonsai in nearly twenty countries.

== Shunkaen Bonsai Museum ==
In 2002, Kobayashi opened the Shunkaen Bonsai Museum (Japanese: 春花園 BONSAI 美術館) in the Edogawa ward of Tokyo. The garden houses over 1,000 trees and attracts abouts 10,000 foreign visitors each year. One of the garden's most famous trees is estimated to be 1,000 years old. This tree, which Kobayashi acquired in an auction, is considered by many to be the finest in his collection.

== Awards ==
Kobayashi has won 10 awards at the Kokufu-ten exhibition, including four Prime Minister Awards (the highest honor). In addition, he has won the Koju-ten Taisho (first place), four Saikan-ten Prime Minister Awards, the Ministry of Agriculture Award, two Ministry of Education Awards, and numerous other awards and honors.
