= Kaoru Kobayashi =

Kaoru Kobayashi (小林 薫, Kobayashi Kaoru) is a Japanese personal name:

- Kaoru Kobayashi (actor) (born 1951), a Japanese actor born in Kyoto
- Kaoru Kobayashi (murderer) (1968–2013), a pedophile who murdered Kaede Ariyama in Nara in 2004
