= Kobayashi Keisei =

Japanese artist (born 1944)

- Born: January 26, 1944 (age 82); Matsue, Shimane Prefecture

Kobayashi Takao (小林 敬生; born January 26, 1944), known professionally as Kobayashi Keisei, is a Japanese printmaker, academic and artist specializing in hanga and wood engraving. He uses techniques, such as the composition of two wood plates called kagami-bari technique, which creates two mirrored symmetrical figures on both sides of washi paper. He is a professor at the Tama Art University, teaching printmaking. He is also a member of the Japan Print Association and a member of the Japan Artists Association, Inc..

== Biography ==
Kobayashi was born in Matsue, Shimane Prefecture on January 26, 1944. He graduated from the Institute of International Design in Kyoto in 1968.

In 1981, he became a member of the Japan Print Association. His artwork "Transferred soul -S62-8- " was purchased by the Agency for Cultural Affairs in 1987.

Kobayashi was appointed professor at the Tama Art University, Department of Painting to teach a printmaking course in 1997. He gave a lecture on practical skill instruction at the University of Guanajuato in Mexico in 2003. He gave a similar lecture at the China Academy of Art in Hangzhou, China in 2011.

He was awarded the Medal with Purple Ribbon by the Japanese government in 2006.

== Exhibitions ==
- 1978 "The 2nd Contemporary Print Exhibition, Grand-Prix,(Seibu Museum, Tokyo)"<Special Award> =“The Chamber -No6, A1-" /“The Chamber -No8-" =

"The 9th Print Grand Prix Exhibition" <Award> =“The Chamber -No6 C-“=

- 1979 "The 10th Print Grand Prix Exhibition" <Award>= “The Chamber -No11-B-" / “The Chamber -No12 B-" / "Mugonka -NO4-B-" =
- 1981 "The 14th international Biennial of Graphic Art, Ljubliana"

"The 12th Print Grand Prix Exhibition" <Award> = "Space Wonder Land -No4-" / "Space Wonder Land -No5-" / "Space Wonder Land -No6-" / "Space Wonder Land -No8-" =
"The 49th Japan Print Association Exhibition"" <Special Award>
"Contemporary Japanese Print Exhibition (Mall Galleries. London, UenoRoyal Museum, Tokyo)"

- 1982 "The 2nd International Miniature Print Exhibition(Seoul）"<Grand Prix>
- 1983 "The 1st Grand Prix Print Exhibition of Central Museum(Tokyo, Osaka)"<award>"Space Wonder Land -No6-C-"

"The 4th International Print biennial(Seoul)"
"The 1st International Print Biennial(Taipei)"

- 1984 "the 8th British International Print Biennial(Bradford)"

"International Exhibition for Friendship(Seoul)"
"C.W.A.J International Exhibition (Hawaii, Los Angeles, Montreal, London)"
"Print Exhibition Korea and Japan(Seoul, Shimonoseki, Kure)"

- 1987 "The 2nd WakayamaPrint Biennial(Wakayama)"<Special Award>

"The 17th international Biennial of Graphic Art, Ljubliana"

- 1988 "The 22nd Contemporary Art Selective Exhibition(Organizxed by the Agency of Cultural Affeairs, etc.)"
- 1989 "The 3rd Wakayama Print Biennial Exhibition" <Special Award>= " Transferred soul -S63-12-" =

"The 19th modern Japanese Art Exhibition by Mainichi Shinbun (Tokyo, Kyoto, Hiroshima)" Bridgestone Museum Award = "Transferred soul -Foreboding-“=
"Art Exciting '89. The Museum of Modern Art, Saitama, Australia(Queensland Art Gallery)
"The 100th Anniversary of Western Washington.

- 1990 ""The 1st Kochi International Exhibition of Prints Triennial"<Special Award>= "Transferred soul -Foreboding-“=

"The Viella International Art Exhibition(Italy)"
"The 17th Japan-France Contemporary Art Exhibition prize" <Special Award>= "Transferred soul -Illusional Planet-“=

- 1991 "The 1st International print triennale, Osaka" <special Award> = “Transferred soul -H3-3-"=

"The 19th Japan and France contemporary art exhibition" <special Award> = "Transferred soul –Illusional Planet-A-"=
"The 4th Wakayama Print Biennial Exhibition"<Award>= "Transferred soul –At the Dawn-"=

- 1992 "C.W.A.J. Australia Exhibition(Queensland Art Gallery. etc.)"
- 2007 "The 13th Gen Yamaguchi Memorial Grand Prize"

== Public collection ==
=== Abroad ===
British Museum / Royal Academy of arts (the U.K.) Rue yellowtail hole international print center (Slovenia) Washington State University / Pueblo Museum (U.S.A.) Guanajuato state establishment Alhondiga de Granaditas Museum / Diego Rivera Museum (Mexico) Ticotin Japan Museum (Israel) New South Wales art museum (Australia) New Zealand National Gallery (New Zealand) Taipei City art museum (the Republic of China) Silpakorn University (Thailand) Ilmin Museum (Korea)

=== In Japan ===
The National Museum of Modern Art, Tokyo / Bridgestone Museum of Art/ Machida City Museum of Graphic Arts / The Museum Of Modern Art, Saitama / Yokohama Museum Of Art / Yamanashi Prefectural Museum of Art / Suzaka HANGA Museum / Kamiyamada Cultural Center / Saku Municipal Museum of Modern Art / Niigata City Art Museum/ The Museum Of Modern Art, Toyama / Kurobe City Art Museum / Aichi Prefectural art museum / Okazaki City art museum / National Museum of Art, Osaka / Osaka Contemporary Art Center / The Museum of Modern Art, Wakayama / Hiroshima Prefectural art museum / Higashihiroshima City Museum of Art / Shimane art museum / The Museum of Art, Kochi / Kami City art museum / Miyazaki Prefectural art museum / Agency for Cultural Affairs

== Publication ==
- 1968 Portfolio of original prints "The Social Movement of Japan, Meiji Era" (private house book wood engraving)
- 1979 Portfolio of original prints "A song without words " (Shirota Gallery)
- 1984 Portfolio of original prints "In the silent time" (Shirota Gallery)
- 1992 "Keisei Kobayashi Wood Engraving 1977–1992" (Gallery station Co., Ltd. ISBN 4-915478-50-5 ISBN 978-4915478505)
- 2011 October "Keisei Kobayashi Ctalogue Rqaisonne Wood-Engraving 1976–2011-" publication (Abe publication Co., Ltd. ISBN 4-87242-328-3 ISBN 978-4872423280)

Portfolio of original prints " Transferred soul -paradise (Eden)- " (Shirota Gallery)

== Sources ==
- "Keisei Kobayashi Wood Engraving 1977–1992" (Gallery Station ISBN 4-915478-50-5 ISBN 978-4915478505)
- "Keisei Kobayashi Wood Engraving exhibition 1993" Exhibition Catalogue (Higashihiroshima City art museum)
- "Keisei Kobayashi catalogue Raisonne Wood-Engraving 1976–2011-" publication (Abe publication Co., Ltd. ISBN 4-87242-328-3 ISBN 978-4872423280)
- Tama Art University (teacher achievements exhibition system - Keisei Kobayashi)
