= Dawn Kobayashi =

Jamaican sport shooter

Personal information
- Full name: Dawn Marie Kobayashi
- Nationality: Jamaica
- Born: 18 June 1971 (age 55) Kingston, Jamaica
- Height: 1.66 m (5 ft 5 1/2 in)
- Weight: 70 kg (154 lb)

Sport
- Sport: Shooting
- Event: 10 m air rifle (AR40)
- Club: Jamaica Air Rifle Association
- Coached by: Keith Hammond (national)

Dawn Marie Kobayashi (born 18 June 1971 in Kingston) is a Jamaican sport shooter. She has been selected to compete for Jamaica at the 2004 Summer Olympics, setting a historic milestone as the nation's first ever sport shooter after forty years. Kobayashi trains for the Jamaica Air Rifle Association and the national team under the tutelage of Keith Hammond.

Kobayashi qualified as a lone shooter for the Jamaican squad in the women's 10 m air rifle at the 2004 Summer Olympics in Athens. She had been granted an Olympic invitation for her country by the ISSF and the IOC, having registered a minimum qualifying score of 391 from her eight-place finish at the 2003 Pan American Games in Santo Domingo, Dominican Republic. Kobayashi shot a decent 383 out of a possible 400 to force in a two-way tie with Nicaragua's Svitlana Kashchenko for forty-first place in the qualifying round, finishing just eight points off her entry best.
