= Kōji Kobayashi =

Koji Kobayashi may refer to:

- Kōji Kobayashi (boxer) (born 1957), Japanese boxer
- Koji Kobayashi (water polo), Japanese water polo player, who participated in Water polo at the 2010 Asian Games – Men
- Koji Kobayashi (engineer) (1907 – 1996) , engineer and namesake of an IEEE Founders Medal
- Koji Kobayashi, character in Godzilla Raids Again
- Koji Kobayashi (corporate executive), vice president of Toyota Motor corporation
