= Mao Kobayashi =

Mao Kobayashi may refer to:

- Mao Kobayashi (actress) (1982–2017), Japanese newscaster and actress
- Mao Kobayashi (model) (born 1992), Japanese model
