= Masato Kobayashi =

Masato Kobayashi may refer to:

- Masato (kickboxer) (born 1979), former Japanese welterweight kickboxer
- Masato Kobayashi (baseball) (born 1980), Japanese baseball pitcher
- Masato Kobayashi (linguist), Japanese linguist
- Masato Kobayashi (painter) (born 1957), Japanese painter
