= Kobayashi Kiyochika =

Japanese artist (1847–1915)

- 小林 清親
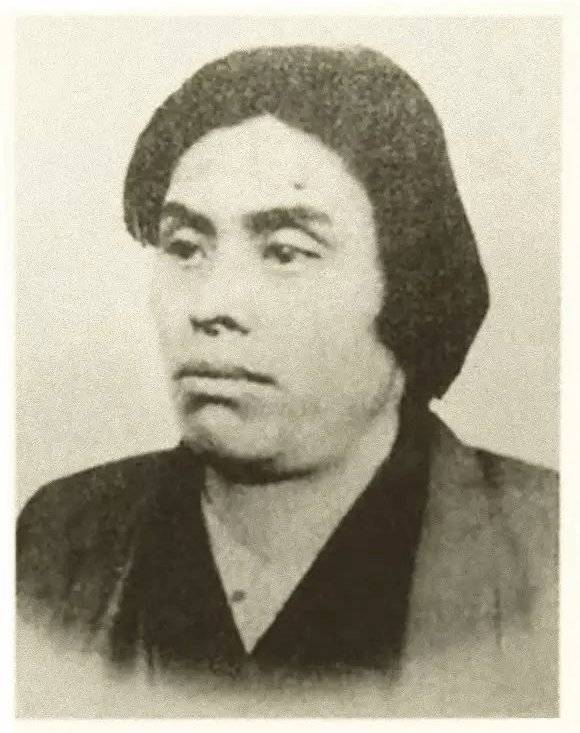
- Kobayashi c. 1873
- Born: Kobayashi Katsunosuke; 10 September 1847; Edo, Japan
- Died: 28 November 1915 (aged 68); Tokyo, Japan
- Movement: Ukiyo-e

Kobayashi Kiyochika (小林 清親; 10 September 1847 – 28 November 1915) was a Japanese ukiyo-e artist, best known for his colour woodblock prints and newspaper illustrations. His work documents the rapid modernization and Westernization Japan underwent during the Meiji period (1868–1912) and employs a sense of light and shade called kōsen-ga inspired by Western art techniques. His work first found an audience in the 1870s with prints of red-brick buildings and trains that had proliferated after the Meiji Restoration; his prints of the First Sino-Japanese War of 1894–95 were also popular. Woodblock printing fell out of favour during this period, and many collectors consider Kobayashi's work the last significant example of ukiyo-e.

== Life and career ==
Kiyochika was born Kobayashi Katsunosuke (小林 勝之助) on 10 September 1847 (the first day of the eighth month of the ninth year of Kōka on the Japanese calendar) in a Kurayashiki in the Honjo neighborhood in Edo (modern Tokyo). His father was Kobayashi Mohē (茂兵衛), who worked as a minor official in charge of unloading rice collected as taxes. His mother Chikako (知加子) was the daughter of another such official, Matsui Yasunosuke (松井安之助). The 1855 Edo earthquake destroyed the family home but left the family unharmed.

Though the youngest of his parents' nine children, Kiyochika took over as head of the household upon his father's death in 1862 and changed his name from Katsunosuke. As a subordinate to a kanjō-bugyō official Kiyochika travelled to Kyoto in 1865 with Tokugawa Iemochi's retinue, the first shogunal visit to Kyoto in over two centuries. They continued to Osaka, where Kiyochika thereafter made his home. During the Boshin War in 1868 Kiyochika participated on the side of the shōgun in the Battle of Toba–Fushimi in Kyoto and returned to Osaka after defeat of the shōgun's forces. He returned by land to Edo and re-entered the employ of the shōgun. After the fall of Edo he relocated to Shizuoka, the heartland of the Tokugawa clan, where he stayed for the next several years.

Kiyochika returned to the renamed Tokyo in May 1873 with his mother, who died there that September. He began to concentrate on art and associated with such artists as Shibata Zeshin and Kawanabe Kyōsai, under whom he may have studied painting. In 1875, he began producing series of ukiyo-e prints of the rapidly modernizing and Westernizing Tokyo and is said to have studied Western-style painting under Charles Wirgman. In August, 1876 he produced the first kōsen-ga (光線画, "light-ray pictures"), ukiyo-e prints employing Western-style naturalistic light and shade, possibly under the influence of the photography of Shimooka Renjō.

Early kōsen-ga prints

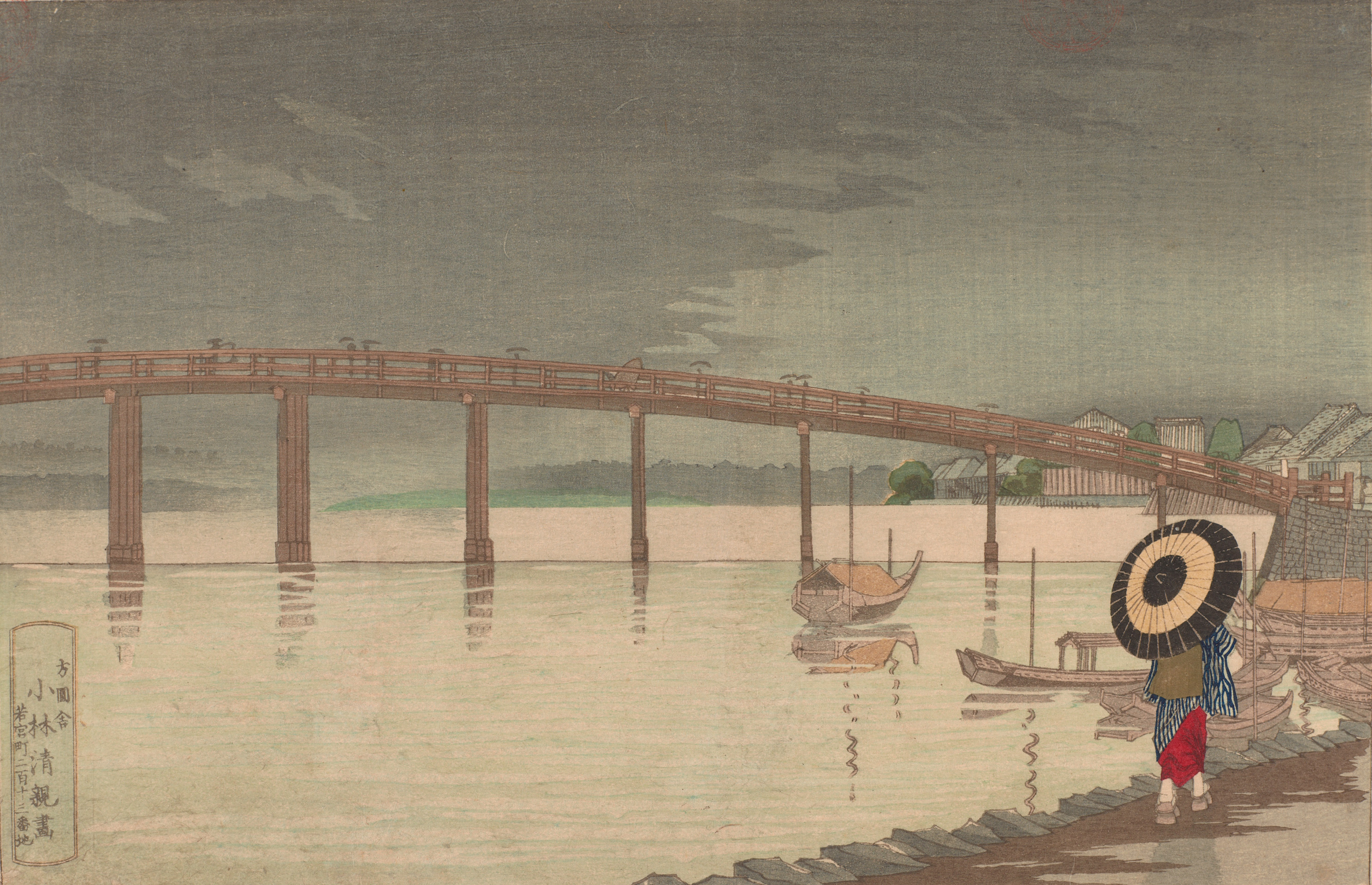
View of Tokyo's Shin-Ohashi bridge in Rain, 1876

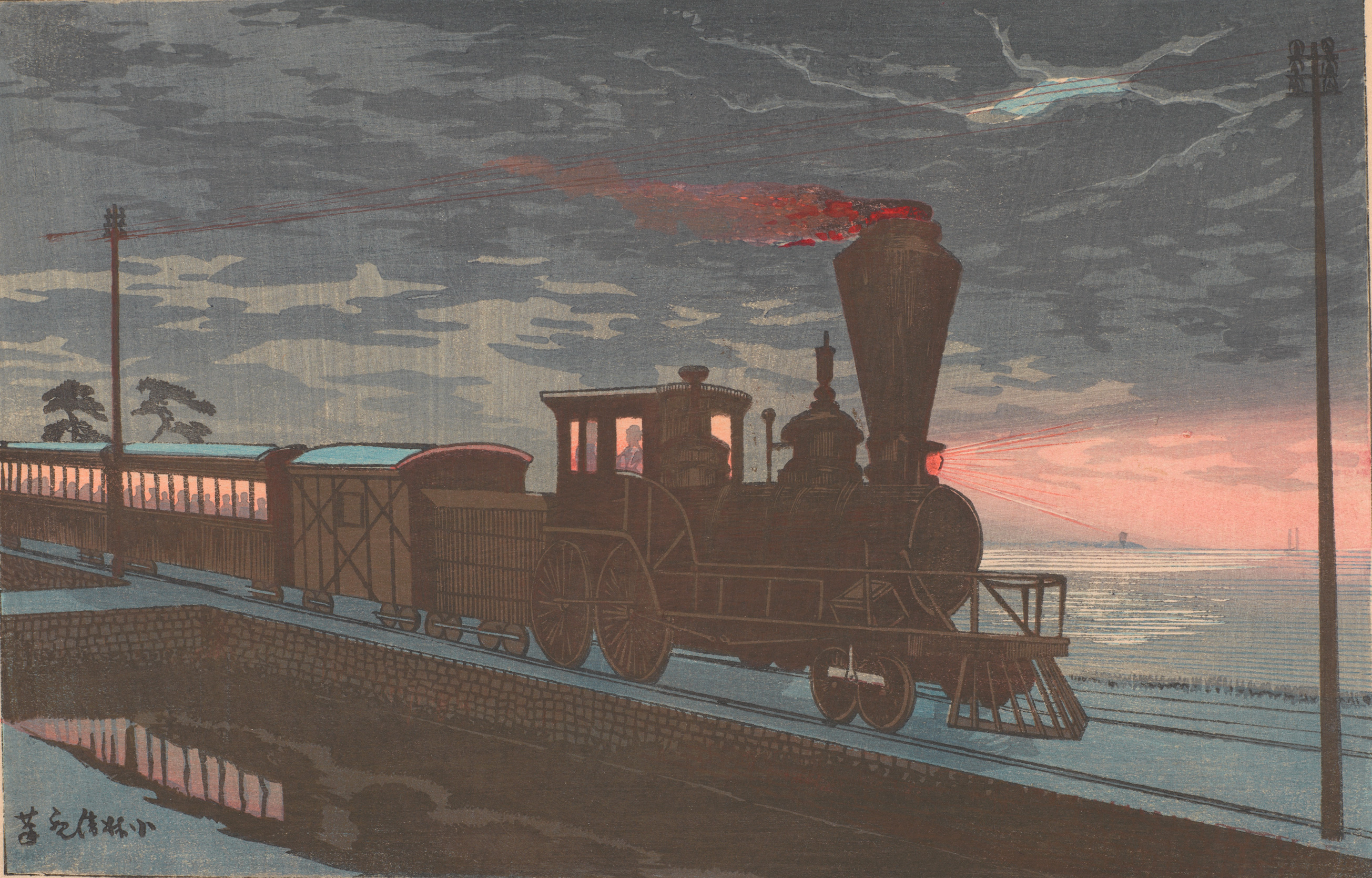
View of Takanawa Ushimachi under a Shrouded Moon, 1879

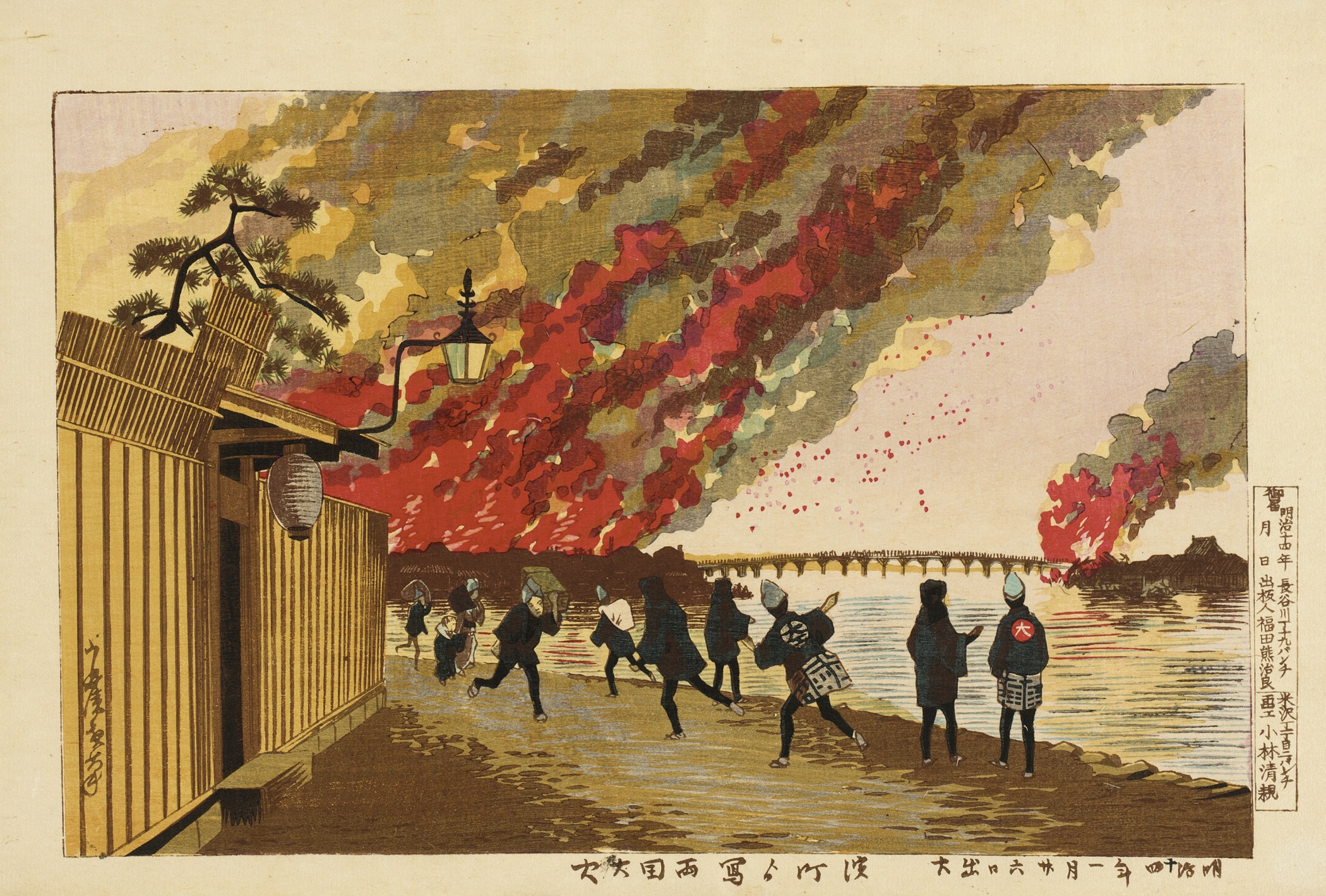
The Ryōgoku Fire Sketched from Hama-chō, 1881

Inoue Yasuji began training under Kiyochika in 1878 and saw his own works published beginning in 1880. Kiyochika's house burned down in the Great Fire at Ryōgoku of 26 January 1881 while he was out sketching. He sketched the Great Fire at Hisamatsu-chō of 11 February, and these fires became the basis of well-received prints such as Fire at Ryogoku from Hama-cho and Outbreak of Fire Seen from Hisamatsu-cho. Demand for his prints decreased in the 1880s and Kiyochika turned to comic images for newspapers. The Dandan-sha publishing company employed him from late 1881, and caricatures of his appeared in each issue of the satirical Marumaru Chinbun from August 1882. He continued to produce prints, but at a less frequent pace.

These were produced primarily from 1876 to 1881; Kiyochika would continue to publish ukiyo-e prints for the rest of his life, but also worked extensively in illustrations and sketches for newspapers, magazines, and books. He also produced a number of prints depicting scenes from the Sino-Japanese War and Russo-Japanese War, collaborating with caption writer Koppi Dojin, penname of Nishimori Takeki (1861–1913), to contribute a number of illustrations to the propaganda series Nihon banzai hyakusen hyakushō ("Long live Japan: 100 victories, 100 laughs").

The Sino-Japanese War of 1894–95 saw a revival in popularity for prints and Kiyochika was one of the most prolific producers of them. Thereafter the print market shrank, and Kiyochika's wife opened a business selling fans and postcards to help support them. The Russo-Japanese War of 1904–05 provided another opportunity for such patriotic prints, but they found much less popularity by then. Kiyochika produced only eighteen triptychs and a few comic prints, of generally lower quality than his earlier prints. Rather, photographs from the front dominated the market.

War prints

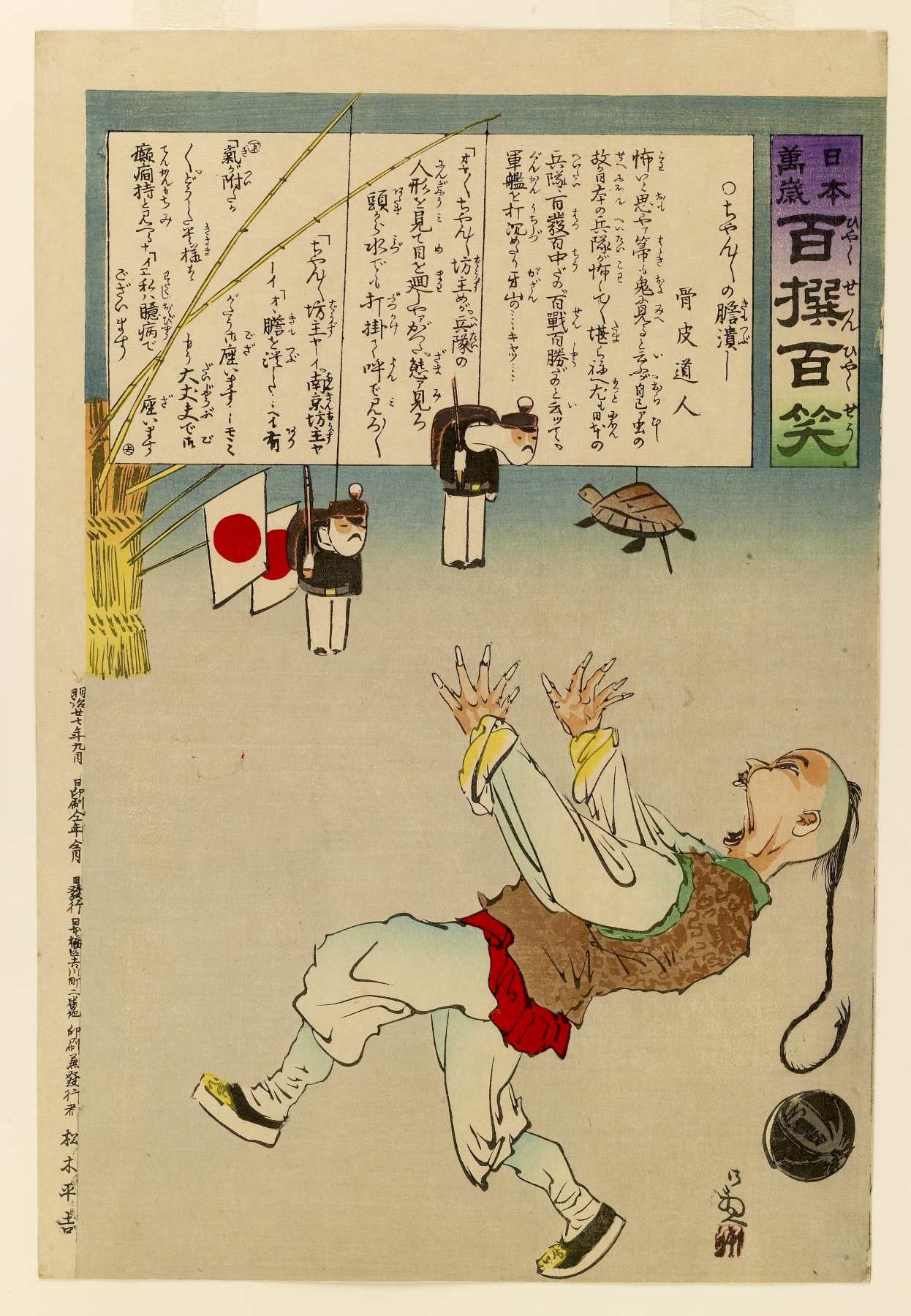
First Sino-Japanese War print, 1894
"It was said the Chinese were so easily frightened that toy soldiers could make them scream."

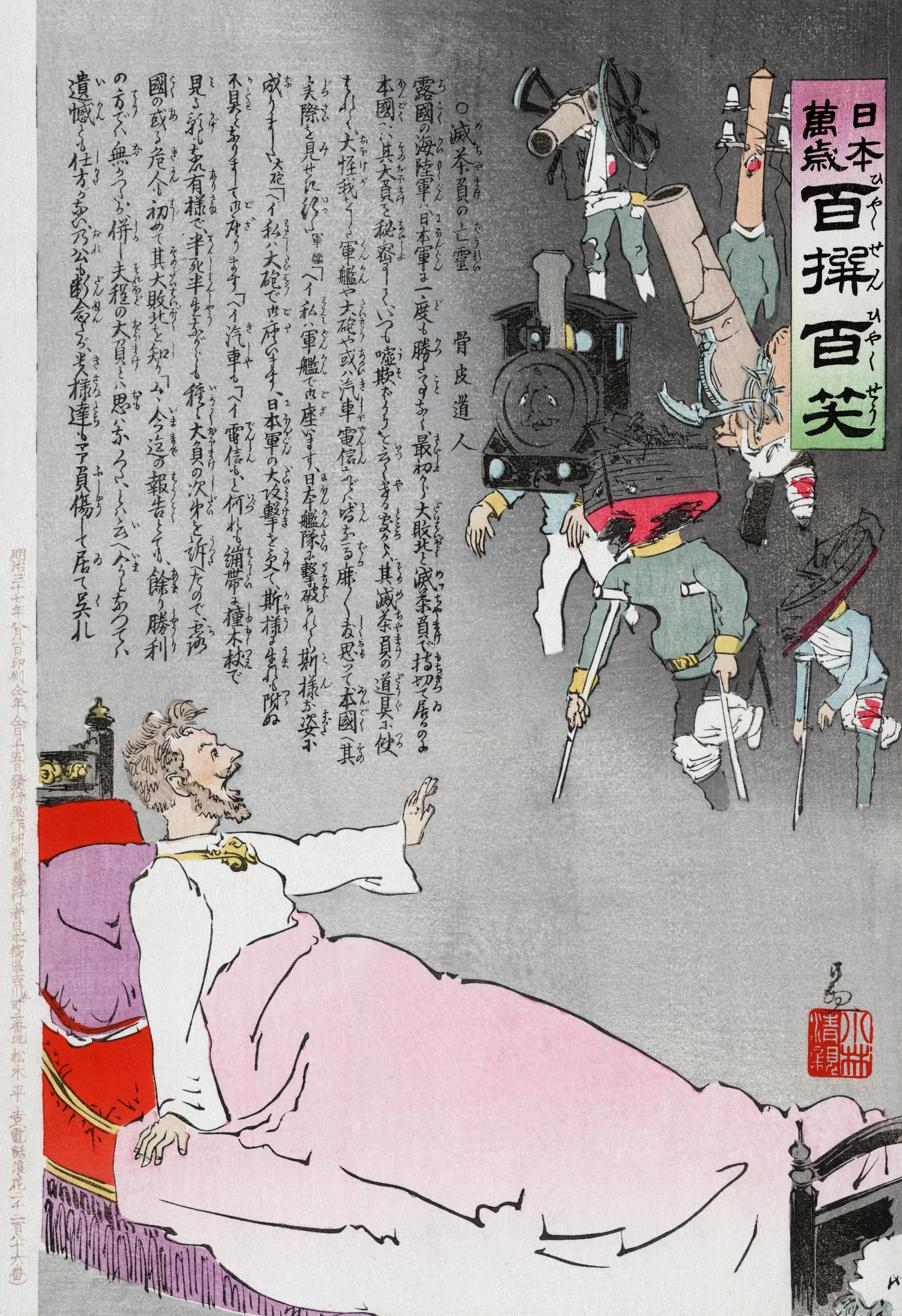
Russo-Japanese War print depicting Tsar Nicholas II waking from a nightmare, c. 1904–05

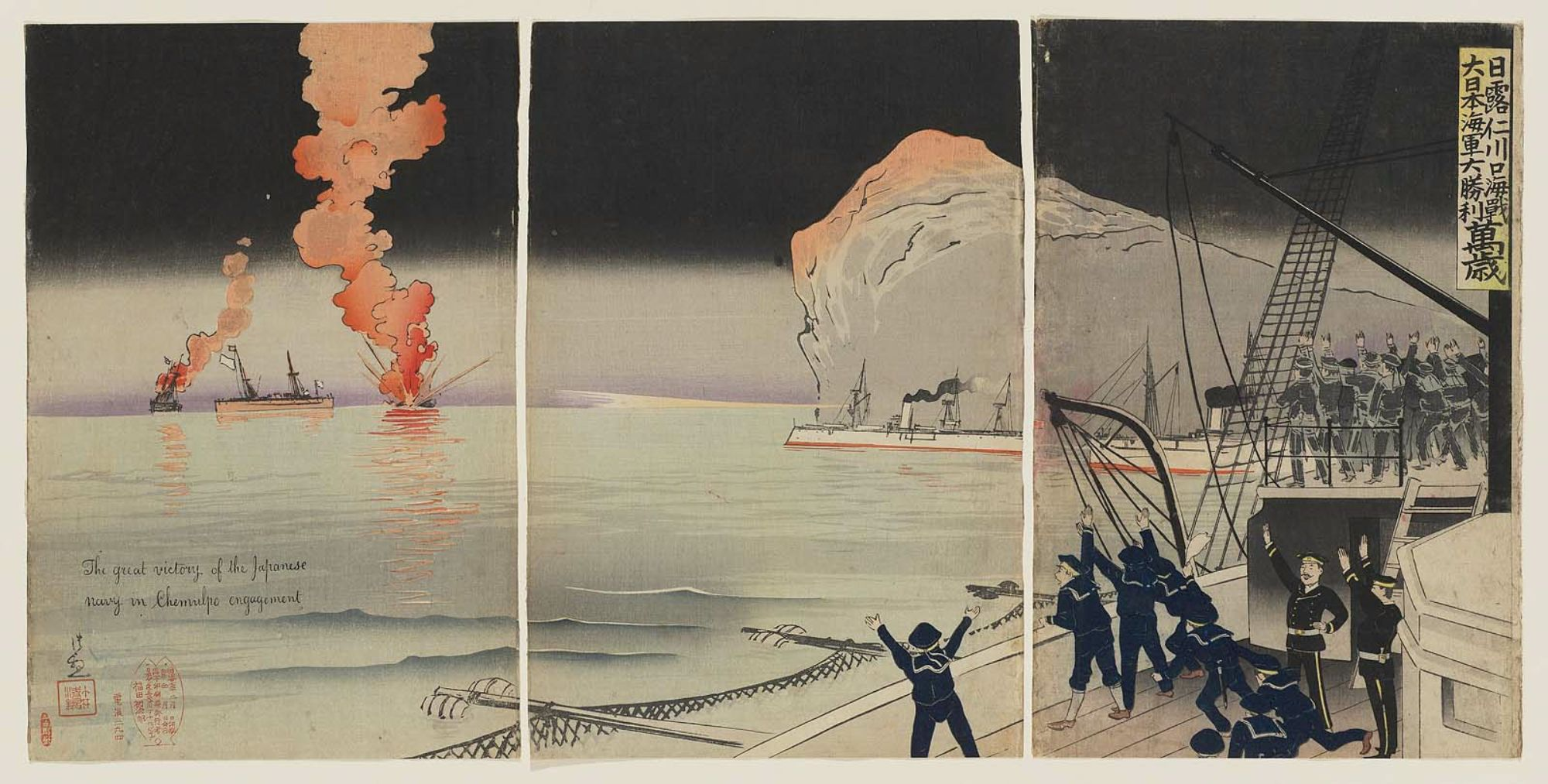
The Great Victory of the Japanese Navy, 1904

In his later years Kiyochika gave up prints and devoted himself to painting, which he practised in a style inspired by the Shijō school. His wife Yoshiko died in 1912. Kiyochika spent July to October 1915 in Nagano Prefecture and visited the Asama Onsen hot springs in Matsumoto to treat his rheumatism. On 28 November 1915 Kiyochika died at his Tokyo home in Nakazato, Kita Ward. His grave is at Ryūfuku-in Temple in Motoasakusa.

== Personal life ==
Kiyochika had married a first wife around 1870; they separated shortly, before he married Fujita Kinu (藤田きぬ) in April 1876; they had two daughters: Kinko (銀子, b. 1878) and Tsuruko (鶴子, b. 1881). Kiyochika and Kinu separated around 1883; in 1884 he married Tajima Yoshiko (田島 芳子, d. 13 April 1912), with whom he had three more daughters: Natsuko (奈津子, b. 1886), Seiko (せい子, 1890–99), and Katsu (哥津, b. 1894).

== Style and analysis ==
His caricatures in the Marumaru Chinbun probably represent Kiyochika's best-remembered work. The humour frequently targeted differences between the Japanese and foreigners, whose numbers were increasing in Japan, albeit restricted to certain locations, under the conditions of the unequal treaties the Meiji government had been coerced into signing. Kiyochika depicted foreigners as foolish and whose inexpensive modern wares he presented as aesthetically inferior to traditional domestic ones. Kiyochika's open criticism of the foreign community was unusual amongst contemporary caricaturists. He depicts the Russians as cowardly buffoons in his caricatures from the Russo-Japanese War period; generally they are of lower quality than his earlier cartoons.

Kiyochika's prints show a concern with light and shadow, most likely an influence of the Western-style painting that came in vogue in Japan in the 1870s. He used a subdued palette in his prints without the harsher aniline dyes that had come into use earlier in the century. His specialty was night scenes illuminated by sources within the composition, such as by lamps. The colours give his prints a sombre air that discourages a clearly affirmative reading of the modernization it depicts.

Kiyochika employed Western-style geometric perspective, volumetric modeling, and chiaroscuro to a degree that distinguishes his work from the majority of his ukiyo-e predecessors. Despite this clear influence of Western art, Kiyochika himself described his work as being in the style of Iwasa Matabei and Hishikawa Moronobu, and stylistic echoes of both artists can indeed be found in his prints. His compositions display the influence of Hiroshige in how objects in the frame are often cut off at the edges.

Kiyochika's woodblock prints stand apart from those of the earlier Edo period, incorporating not only Western styles but also Western subjects, as he depicted the introduction of such things as horse-drawn carriages, clock towers, and railroads to Tokyo. The modern cityscapes typically form a backdrop to human comings-and-goings rather than the focus itself and appear to observe rather than celebrate or deny Meiji industrial modernization and its promotion of fukoku kyōhei ("enrich the state, strengthen the military"); in contrast, Kiyochika's contemporary Yoshitoshi with his samurai battle prints glorified conservative values against the ideals of Westernization.

During the Edo period most ukiyo-e artists regularly produced shunga erotic pictures, despite government censorship. In the Meiji period censorship became stricter as the government wanted to present a Japan that met the moral expectations of the West, and production of shunga became scarce. Kiyochika is one of the artists not known to have produced any erotic art.

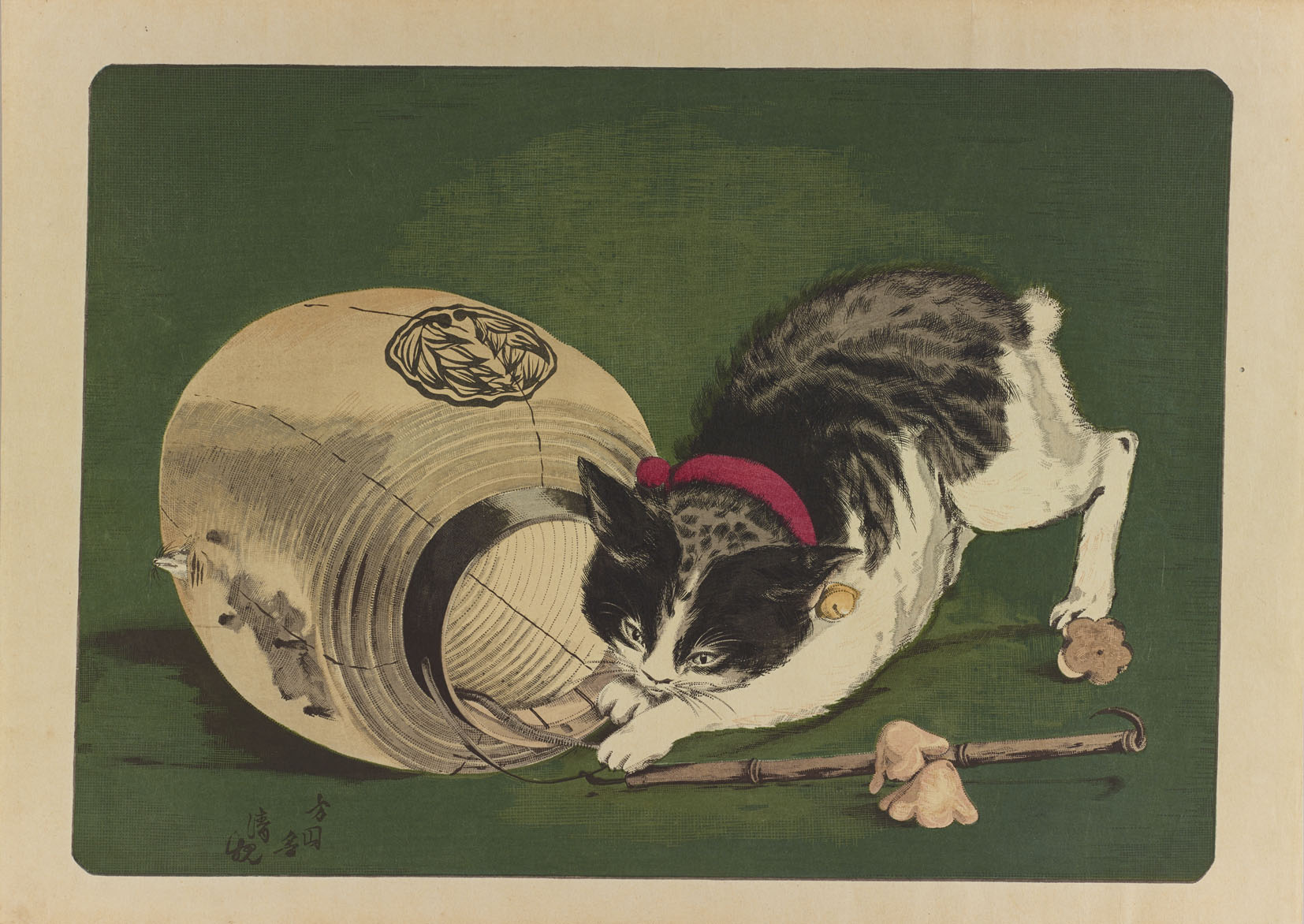
Cat and lantern, 1877

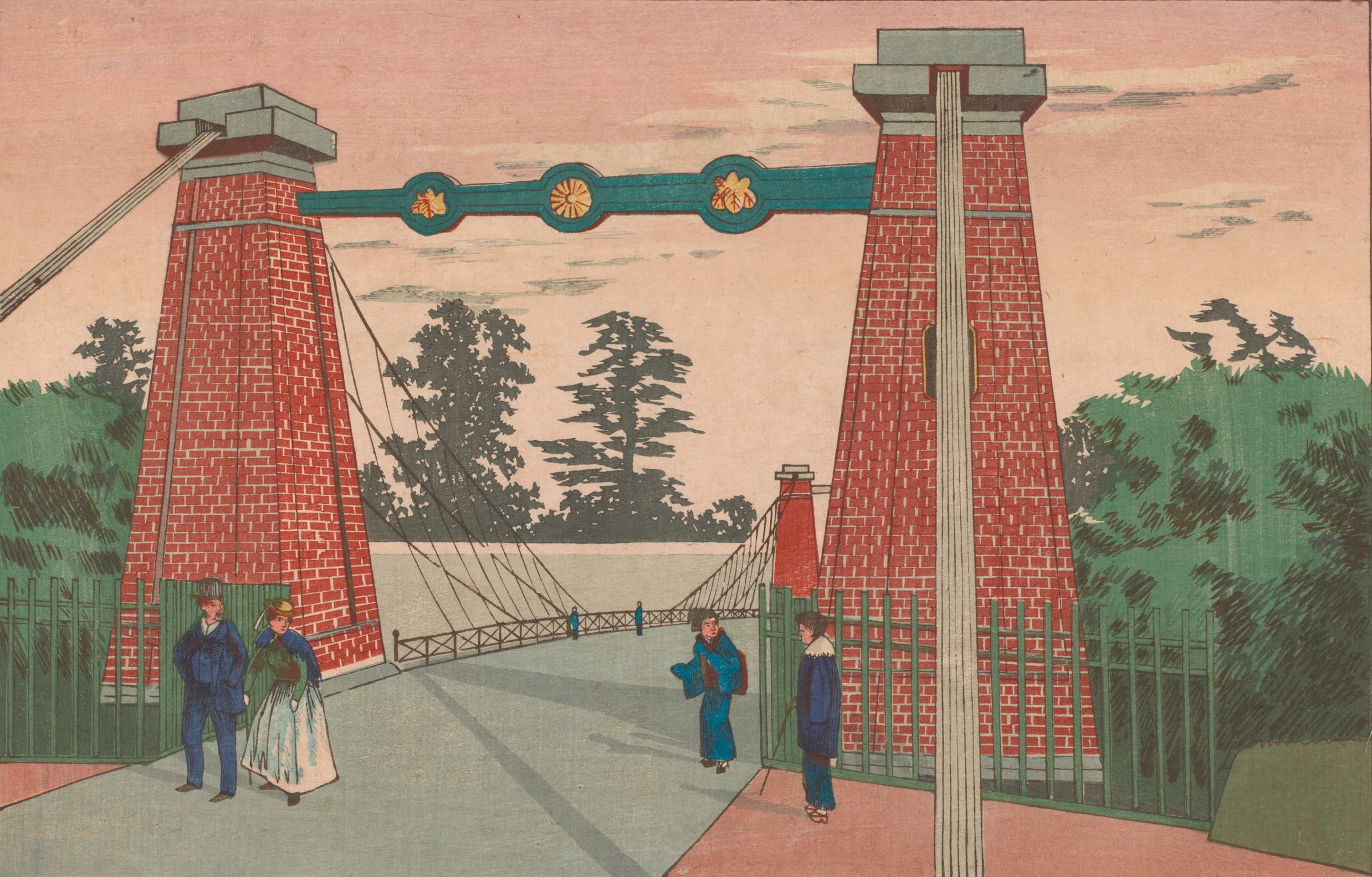
Suspension Bridge on Castle Grounds, c. 1879

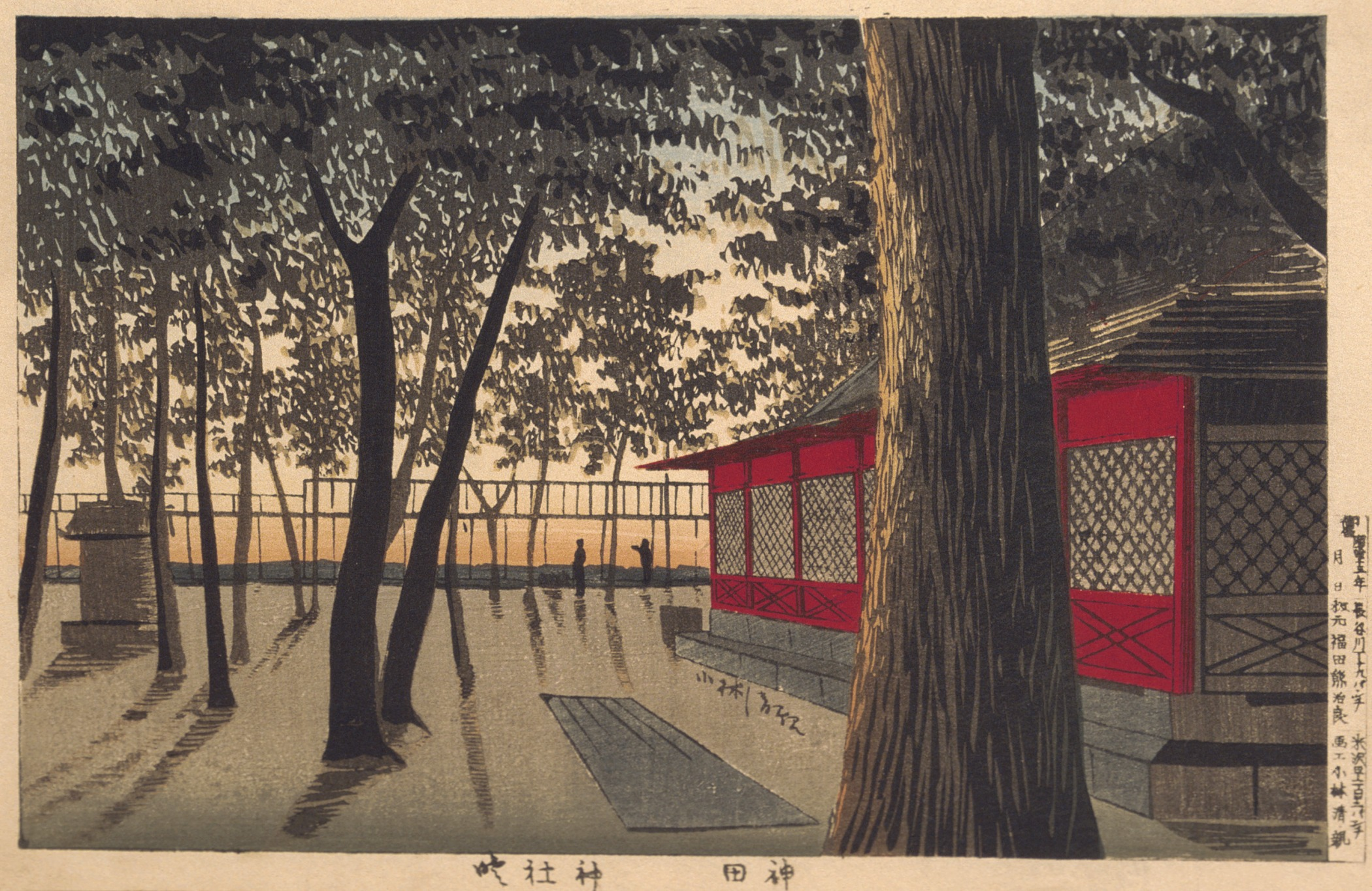
Kanda Shrine at Dawn, 1880

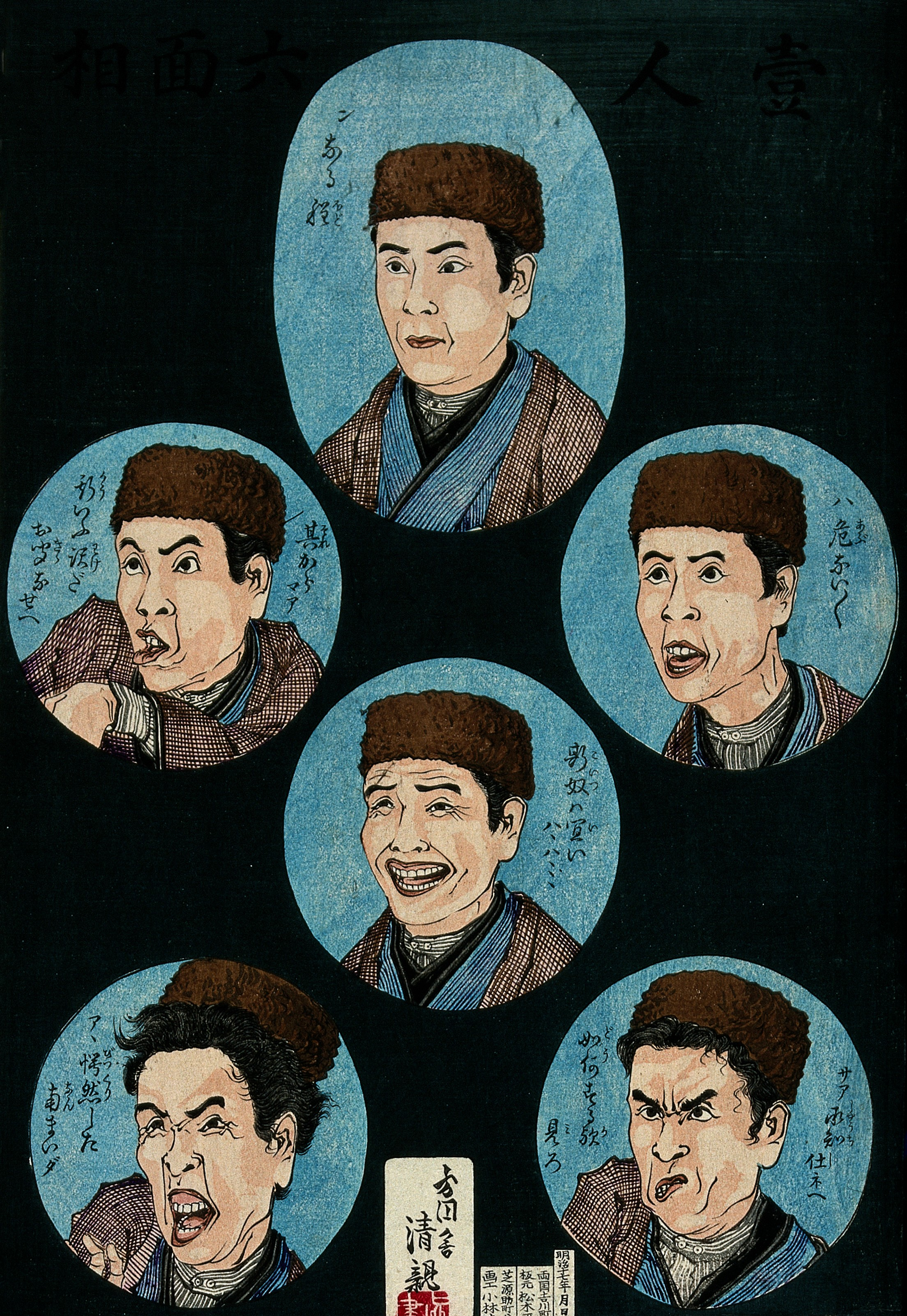
Six renditions of an older boy, 1884

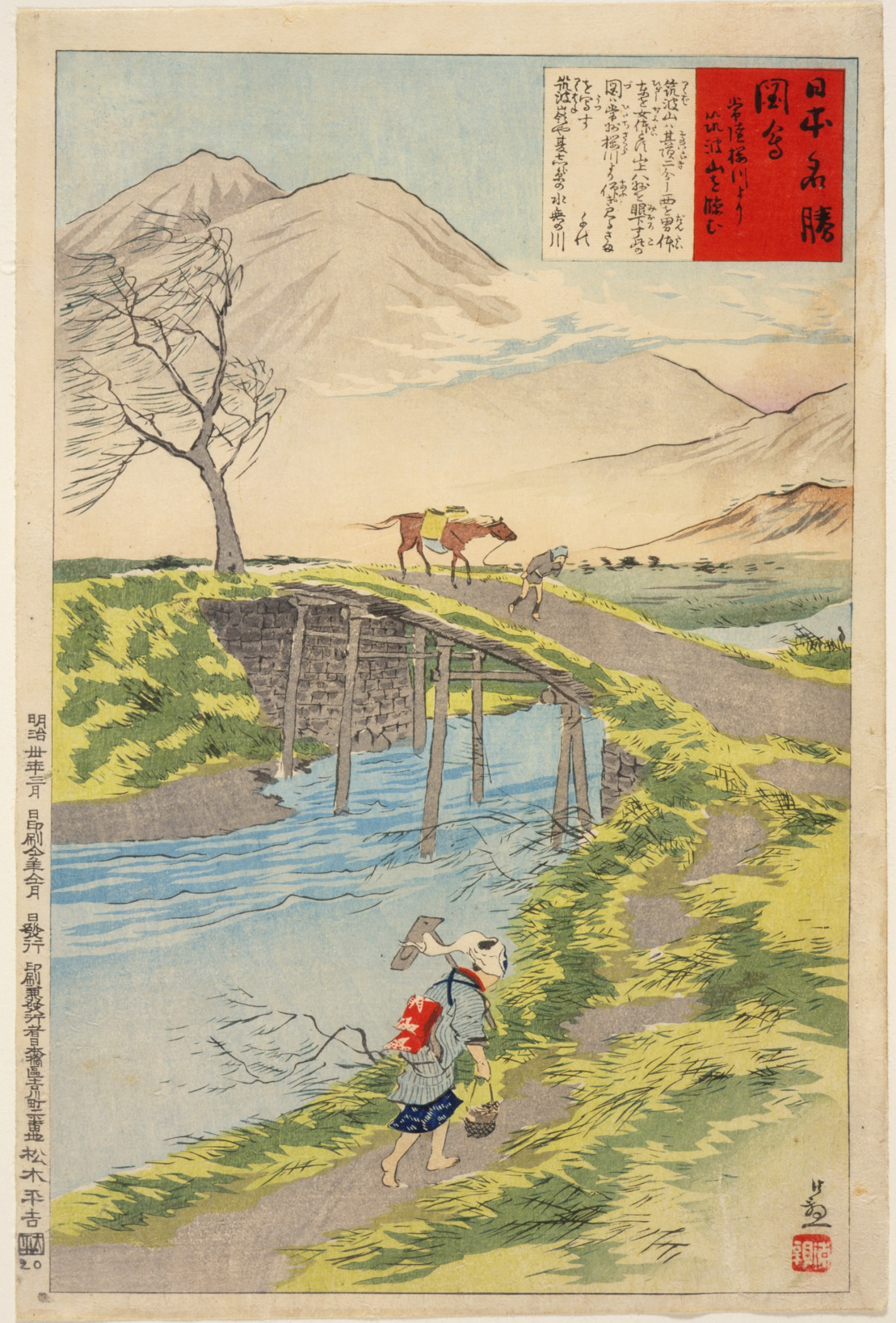
Tsukuba Mountain Seen from Sakura River at Hitachi, 1897

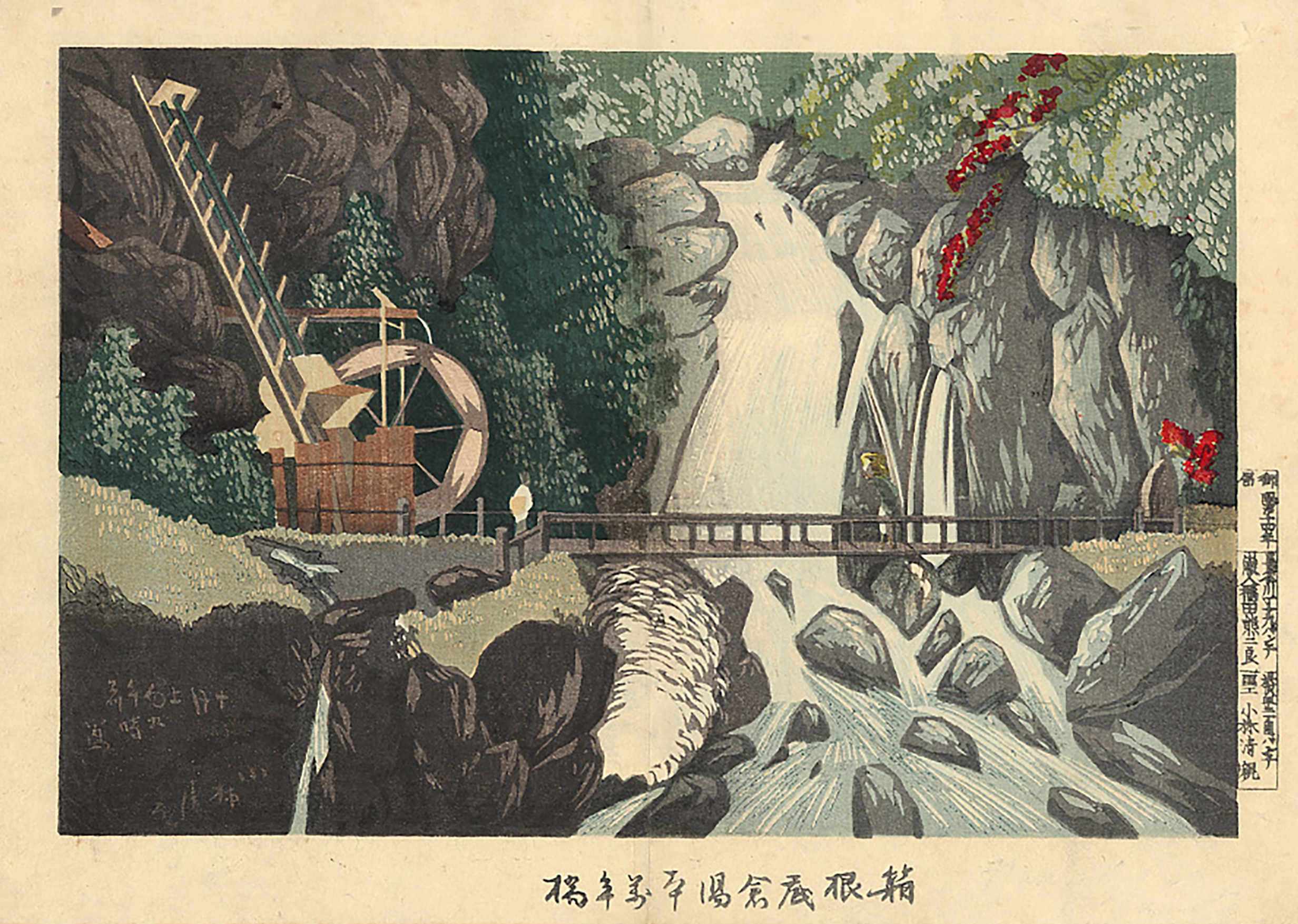
Hakone Sokokura Yumoto. The bridge at Sokokura hot spring, 1881

== Legacy ==
Kiyochika's depictions of the Westernization of Meiji Japan has both benefited and hindered later assessment of his work; it disappoints collectors looking for an idealized Japan of old that lures many to ukiyo-e, while it provides a historical record of the radical changes of the time.

Tsuchiya Kōitsu became a student of Kiyochika's and used dramatic lighting effects inspired by Kiyochika's in his work; he worked in the Kobayashi's home for nineteen years.

Richard Lane wrote that Kiyochika could represent "either the last important ukiyo-e master, or the first noteworthy print artist of modern Japan", but that "it is probably most accurate to regard him as an anachronistic survival from an earlier age, a minor hero whose best efforts to adapt ukiyo-e to the new world of Meiji Japan were not quite enough". He considered Kiyochika's best works to fall short of Hiroshige's greatest, but to be on par with the best of Kuniyoshi and Kunisada.

== Works cited ==
- Boscaro, Andrea; Gatti, Franco; Raveri, Massimo (1990). Rethinking Japan: Literature, Visual Arts & Linguistics. St. Martin's Press.
- Buckland, Rosina (2013). "Shunga in the Meiji Era: The End of a Tradition?". Japan Review (26): 259–76. JSTOR 41959827.
- Katō, Yōsuke (2015). "小林清親の画業" [The works of Kobayashiu Kiyochika]. Kobayashi Kiyochika: Bunmei kaika no hikari to kage wo mitsumete 小林清親: 文明開化の光と影をみつめて [Kobayashi Kiyochika: Gazing at the light and shadow of Meiji-period modernization] (in Japanese). Seigensha. pp. 194–197. ISBN 978-4-86152-480-6.
- Kikkawa, Hideki (2015). "小林清親年譜" [Kobayashi Kiyochika chronology]. Kobayashi Kiyochika: Bunmei kaika no hikari to kage wo mitsumete 小林清親: 文明開化の光と影をみつめて [Kobayashi Kiyochika: Gazing at the light and shadow of Meiji-period modernization] (in Japanese). Seigensha. pp. 203–205. ISBN 978-4-86152-480-6.
- Lane, Richard (1962). Masters of the Japanese Print: Their World and Their Work. Doubleday.
- Lane, Richard (1978). Images from the Floating World: The Japanese Print. Oxford University Press. ISBN 9780192114471. OCLC 5246796.
- Lo, Teresa Wing-Yan (1995). The conundrum of Japan's modernization: an examination of enlightenment prints of the 1870s (PDF) (Master of Arts). University of British Columbia. doi:10.14288/1.0099015.
- Meech-Pekarik, Julia (1986). The World of the Meiji Print: Impressions of a New Civilization. Weatherhill. ISBN 978-0-8348-0209-4.
- Merritt, Helen (1990). Modern Japanese Woodblock Prints: The Early Years. University of Hawaii Press. ISBN 978-0-8248-1200-3.
- Merritt, Helen; Yamada, Nanako (1995). Guide to Modern Japanese Woodblock Prints, 1900–1975. University of Hawaii Press. ISBN 978-0-8248-1732-9.
- Yamamoto, Kazuko (2015). "浮世絵版画の死と再生―清親の評価の変遷" [The death and rebirth of ukiyo-e woodblock prints: changes in the assessment of Kiyochika]. Kobayashi Kiyochika: Bunmei kaika no hikari to kage wo mitsumete 小林清親: 文明開化の光と影をみつめて [Kobayashi Kiyochika: Gazing at the light and shadow of Meiji-period modernization] (in Japanese). Seigensha. pp. 198–202. ISBN 978-4-86152-480-6.
