= Hiromi Kobayashi =

Hiromi Kobayashi may refer to:

- Hiromi Kobayashi (golfer) (born 1963), Japanese professional golfer
- Hiromi Kobayashi (synchronized swimmer) (born 1984), Japanese synchronized swimmer
