= Hirokazu Kobayashi =

Hirokazu Kobayashi is the name of:

- Hirokazu Kobayashi (aikidoka) (1929–1998), Japanese aikido teacher and student of the founder of aikido Morihei Ueshiba
- Hirokazu Kobayashi (figure skater) (born 1985), Japanese figure skater
