= Naomi Kobayashi =

Japanese artist

- Born: 1945 (age 80–81)
- Education: Musashino Art University
- Known for: Paper, Textiles, Installation Sculpture

Naomi Kobayashi (Japanese: 小林 尚美, Hepburn: Kobayashi Naomi; born 1945) is a Japanese textiles, paper, installation and sculpture artist.

== Early life and education ==
Naomi Kobayashi was born in Tokyo, Japan, and lives in Kyoto, Japan. She studied textiles, printing and weaving at Musashino Art University. She graduated in 1969. She was married to the late Masakazu Kobayashi, with whom she collaborated.

== Career ==
=== Early work ===
Kobayashi started out as a weaver but became entranced by thread, by the paradox that she described as "so gentle" and "so strong". For the next fifteen years she explored the soft yet strong paradox in wall reliefs and sculptures. This involved using her own off-loom technique where she glued strands of yarn next to each other on a board creating a ribbed texture. On top of this she placed layers of fibre in parallel to this texture, which she built up to create a three-dimensional profile. These pieces dealt with the linearity of fibre, while introducing the element of volume

=== Later work ===
In 1987 Kobayashi made a shift in her practice, using the same technique of building up using glue; she created a free-hanging ring. While her early work focused on solids, these later works focused on voids. While her early work stayed in her thematic red and what, the later work has shifted some, including pink, which she said was white reflecting red. The scale of many of these pieces is monumental, as she received many architectural commissions during this period

=== Themes ===
Formal contrasts are at the core of Kobayashi's work; the relationship of horizontal to vertical, of soft to solid straight to curved and ying to yang. For Kobayashi, the properties of her materials convey metaphysical messages. The cosmos and nature are themes She deals with, as well as "singing" with thread

== Major exhibitions ==
Fiber: Sculpture 1960 – present. Institute of Contemporary Art, Boston, USA, Wexner Center for the Arts Columbus, USA, Des Moines Art Center, Iowa, USA, 2015

Tradition Transformed: Contemporary Japanese Textile Art and Fiber Sculpture: Sheila Hicks, Masakazu Kobayashi, Naomi Kobayashi, Chiaki Maki, Kaori Maki, Toshio Sekiji, Hiroyuki Shindo, Chiyoko Tanaka, Jun Tomita. Browngrotta Gallery, Wilton, Conn. USA

Structure and Surface: Contemporary Japanese Textiles. The Museum of Modern Art NYC, USA, 1998

Biennale Internationale de la Tapisserie [Laussane Biennale] Laussane, Switzerland, 1977, 1979, 1985, 1989, 1992 (with Masakazu Koyayashi)

FiberWorks—Europe and Japan. National Museum of Modern Art, Tokyo & National Museum of Modern Art, Kyoto Japan, 1976

One person exhibitions with Masakazu Kobayashi at The Allrich Gallery, San Francisco, CA

== Galleries Representation ==
Art2 Gallery in Singapore

The Allrich Gallery, San Francisco, CA (1975-1995)

== Public collections ==
The MET

Cleveland Museum of Art

The V&A

Minneapolis Institute of Art
