= Miyuki Kobayashi =

Miyuki Kobayashi may refer to:

- Miyuki Kobayashi (writer) (小林 深雪), Japanese writer
- Miyuki Kobayashi (canoeist) (小林 美幸, born 1967), Japanese sprint canoeist
