= Yūsuke Kobayashi =

Yūsuke Kobayashi may refer to:

- Yūsuke Kobayashi (voice actor) (born 1985), Japanese voice actor
- Yusuke Kobayashi (footballer, born 1983), Japanese footballer
- Yusuke Kobayashi (footballer, born 1994), Japanese footballer
- Yūsuke Kobayashi (judoka) (born 1993), Japanese judoka
