= Takashi Kobayashi =

Takashi Kobayashi may refer to:

- Takashi Kobayashi (musician) (born 1965), member of Japanese rock band The Boom
- Takashi Kobayashi (racing driver) (born 1987), Japanese racing driver
- Takashi Kobayashi (wrestler) (born 1963), Japanese Olympic wrestler
