= Osamu Kobayashi =

Osamu Kobayashi is the name of:

- Osamu Kobayashi (animation director) (born 1945), animation director and founder of Ajia-do Animation Works
- Osamu Kobayashi (illustrator) (1964–2021), director of BECK: Mongolian Chop Squad and Paradise Kiss
- Osamu Kobayashi (voice actor) (1934–2011), Japanese voice actor
