= Akiko Kobayashi =

Akiko Kobayashi is the name of:

- Akiko Kobayashi (chemist) (小林 昭子, born 1943), Japanese scientist and professor
- Akiko Kobayashi (singer) (小林 明子, born 1958), Japanese singer, songwriter, composer and arranger
- Akiko Kobayashi (voice actress) (小林 晃子, born 1979), Japanese voice actress and singer
