= Satoru Kobayashi =

Satoru Kobayashi may refer to:

- Satoru Kobayashi (director) (小林 悟, 1930–2001), Japanese film director
- Satoru Kobayashi (footballer) (小林 悟, born 1973), Japanese footballer
- Satoru Kobayashi (Go player) (小林 覚, born 1959), Japanese Go player
