= Hideaki Kobayashi =

Hideaki Kobayashi may refer to:

- Hideaki Kobayashi (composer) (born 1973), game music composer for Sega
- Hideaki Kobayashi (diplomat) (born 1945), Japanese diplomat
- Hideaki Kobayashi (cosplayer) (born 1962), Japanese cosplayer
