= Kevin Wesley Kobayashi =

Kevin Wesley Kobayashi from RF Micro Devices, Torrance, California, was named Fellow of the Institute of Electrical and Electronics Engineers (IEEE) in 2013 for contributions to monolithic microwave integrated circuits (MMIC).
