= Yutaka Kobayashi =

Yutaka Kobayashi is the name of:

== People named 小林温 ==
- Yutaka Kobayashi (politician) (born 1964), former Japanese politician and member of the House of Councillors

== People named 小林豊 ==
- Yutaka Kobayashi (actor) (born 1989), Japanese actor and singer
- Yutaka Kobayashi (announcer), Japanese TV announcer and meteorologist
- Yutaka Kobayashi (businessman), Japanese TV director, producer, and businessman

== Fictional characters ==
- Kobayashi Yutaka, in Megatokyo
