= Hiroyuki Kobayashi =

Hiroyuki Kobayashi may refer to:

- Hiroyuki Kobayashi (baseball) (born 1978), Japanese pitcher
- Hiroyuki Kobayashi (footballer) (born 1980), Japanese football (soccer) player
- Hiroyuki Kobayashi (producer) (born 1972), Japanese video game producer and director
