= Fumiaki Kobayashi =

Fumiaki Kobayashi may refer to:

- Fumiaki Kobayashi (pole vaulter) (小林 史明, born 1974), Japanese pole vaulter
- Fumiaki Kobayashi (politician) (小林 史明, born 1983), Japanese politician
