= Ron Kobayashi =

American jazz musician

Ron Kobayashi is an American jazz pianist, from southern California. He has worked with Kenny Burrell, Tom Scott, Margaret Whiting, Peter Frampton, the Modernaires, Peter White, Mel Tormé, and Tim Weisberg. He served as music director of the Hollywood Diversity Awards for five years.

The Ron Kobayashi Trio was formed in 1994. The Trio has recorded a DVD and 4 CDs which have received airplay around the world. In 1996, the trio was voted Best Jazz Group in Orange County by readers of the Orange County Weekly. In 2012, the Ron Kobayashi Trio was nominated for Best Jazz at the Orange County Music Awards.

Kobayashi is a faculty member at the Orange County School of the Arts and Biola University.

== Discography ==
- Trio (1994)
- Exotic Places (1998)
- No Preservatives (2001)
- Of Standards, Be-Bop and Swing (2007)
- DVD "Live at Steamers" (2003)
