= Deaths in December 1992 =

The following is a list of notable deaths in December 1992.

Entries for each day are listed alphabetically by surname. A typical entry lists information in the following sequence:

- Name, age, country of citizenship at birth, subsequent country of citizenship (if applicable), reason for notability, cause of death (if known), and reference.

== December 1992 ==
=== 1 ===
- Don Allum, 55, British oarsman, first person to row across the Atlantic Ocean in both directions, heart attack.
- Magne Bleness, 59, Norwegian actor and theatre director.
- Chile Gómez, 83, Mexican-American Major League Baseball player (Philadelphia Phillies, Washington Senators).
- Floyd Hicks, 77, American politician and attorney, member of the United States House of Representatives (1965-1977).
- Sam Lowry, 72, American baseball player (Philadelphia Athletics).
- Anton Malatinský, 72, Slovak football player.
- Robert Mitchell, 81, American Olympic weightlifter (1936).
- Packie Nelson, 85, American football player (Chicago Bears).
- Paulo Rónai, 85, Hungarian-Brazilian translator, philologist, and critic.
- Jefferson Souza, 84, Brazilian Olympic water polo player (1932).
- D. G. M. Wood-Gush, 70, South African ethologist.

=== 2 ===
- Jack Caffery, 58, Canadian ice hockey player (Toronto Maple Leafs, Boston Bruins).
- Tony Cuesta, 66, Cuban exile.
- Jaime de la Rosa, 71, Filipino actor.
- Michael Gothard, 53, English actor (For Your Eyes Only, The Three Musketeers, Arthur of the Britons), suicide by hanging.
- Pete Gross, 55, American sports announcer, cancer.
- Ralph Izzard, 82, English journalist, author, and adventurer.
- Mikhail Karyukov, 87, Soviet film director, cinematographer and screenwriter.
- Frank Nash, 85, Australian rules footballer.
- Frank D. O'Connor, 82, American lawyer and politician.
- Lorne Parkin, 70, Canadian football player (Toronto Argonauts).

=== 3 ===
- Nureddin al-Atassi, 63, Syrian politician, president (1966–1970).
- Luis Alcoriza, 74, Mexican screenwriter and film director.
- Prayoon Chanyavongs, 77, Thai comics artist and cartoonist.
- Frank Follwell, 86, Canadian politician, member of the House of Commons of Canada (1949-1957).
- Charlie McInnes, 76, Australian rules footballer.
- James O'Hara, 65, Irish-American actor (Suddenly, Batman, Death of a Gunfighter).
- Andrei Sepci, 81, Romanian football player.
- Frank Steele, 87, Canadian ice hockey player (Detroit Falcons).
- Clifford Walker, 73, English cricketer.
- Bill Ward, 71, American football player (Washington Redskins, Detroit Lions).

=== 4 ===
- Jorge Brauer, 79, Argentine Olympic sailor (1948, 1952).
- Henry Clausen, 87, American lawyer and investigator.
- Yancho Dimitrov, 49, Bulgarian Olympic footballer (1968).
- Alfie Ferguson, 65, British unionist politician.
- Bert James, 69, Australian rules footballer.
- Sidney Schofield, 81, British politician.

=== 5 ===
- Felipe Padilla de Leon, 80, Filipino composer.
- Emil Haury, 88, American archaeologist.
- Levan Maruashvili, 80, Georgian geographer and alpinist.
- Monisha, 21, Indian actress, traffic collision.
- Rakesh Singh, 22, Indian Army officer and war hero, killed in action.
- Hilary Tindall, 54, English actress, bowel cancer.
- Frank I. Wright, 71, American thoroughbred horse racing trainer and commentator.

=== 6 ===
- Paula Frías Allende, 29, Chilean humanitarian, complications from a medical error.
- J. Michel Fournier, 87, Canadian politician.
- Percy Herbert, 72, English actor (The Bridge on the River Kwai, The Guns of Navarone, Cimarron Strip), heart attack.
- Heorhii Maiboroda, 79, Ukrainian composer.
- Yngve Sköld, 93, Swedish composer.
- László Szabó, 84, Hungarian Olympic rower (1936).
- Hank Worden, 91, American actor (The Searchers, The Alamo, The Lone Ranger).

=== 7 ===
- Zoltán Adamik, 64, Hungarian Olympic sprinter (1952).
- Alojzy Ehrlich, 77-78, Polish table tennis player.
- Richard J. Hughes, 83, American politician, and judge.
- Felix Jackson, 90, German-American screenwriter.
- Thomas Pardoe, 80, English boxer and Olympian (1932).
- Bill Shockley, 55, American gridiron football player (New York Titans, Buffalo Bills, Pittsburgh Steelers).
- Chancellor Williams, 98, American sociologist, historian and writer.

=== 8 ===
- Frederick Barkham, 87, English cricketer.
- Thoppil Bhasi, 68, Indian playwright, screenwriter, and film director.
- Helen Callaghan, 69, Canadian baseball player.
- Hugh Devore, 82, American football player.
- Armanda Guiducci, 69, Italian writer, literary critic, and Marxist feminist.
- Kathy Osterman, 49, American politician, cancer.
- Frithjof Prydz, 49, Norwegian ski jumper, tennis player and Olympian (1972).
- Poola Tirupati Raju, 88, Indian writer, philosopher, and academic.
- Franz Sarnitz, 73, Austrian Olympic sports shooter (1960).
- William Shawn, 85, American magazine editor (The New Yorker).
- Edmund Zieliński, 83, Polish ice hockey player and Olympian (1936).

=== 9 ===
- Carl Barger, 62, American baseball executive, aortic aneurysm.
- Eşref Bilgiç, 84, Turkish international football player and manager.
- Thomas Bottomore, 72, British marxist sociologist.
- Joe Clark, 95, Australian politician.
- Geoffroy Chodron de Courcel, 80, French diplomat.
- Franco Franchi, 64, Italian actor, comedian and singer.
- George Fraser, 81, Canadian football player.
- Vincent Gardenia, 72, Italian-American actor (Bang the Drum Slowly, Little Shop of Horrors, Death Wish), Emmy winner (1990), heart attack.
- Yahya Haqqi, 87, Egyptian novelist.
- Luisito Rey, 47, Spanish singer, pneumonia.

=== 10 ===
- Celia Gámez, 87, Argentinian film actress, Alzheimer's disease.
- Joan Gardner, 66, American voice actress, cancer
- Dan Maskell, 84, English tennis player and commentator, heart failure.
- Josephine McKim, 82, American swimmer, Olympic champion (1928, 1932), and world record-holder.
- John G. A. O'Neil, 55, American politician, traffic collision.
- Jacques Perret, 91, French writer.
- Babe Phelps, 84, American baseball player.
- Émile Poussard, 83, French Olympic diver (1932).
- Bernard Reichel, 91, Swiss composer.
- Jim Reid, 79, Australian rules footballer.

=== 11 ===
- Billy Cook, 83, Northern Irish football player and manager.
- William Michael Cosgrove, 76, American prelate of the Roman Catholic Church.
- Lon Evans, 80, American gridiron football player (Green Bay Packers).
- Ronald Good, 96, British botanist.
- Andy Kirk, 94, American jazz saxophonist, tubist, and band leader, Alzheimer's disease.
- Suzanne Lilar, 91, Belgian novelist and playwright.
- William A. Redmond, 84, American politician.
- Michael Robbins, 62, English actor, prostate cancer.
- William Stevenson, 69, Canadian Olympic canoeist (1948, 1956).

=== 12 ===
- Ali Amini, 87, Iranian politician, prime minister (1961–1962).
- Damir Anić, 48, Croatian Olympic gymnast (1968).
- Nick Borelli, 87, American football player.
- Malachy Carey, 36, Northern Irish IRA volunteer, assassinated.
- Ghislain Delaunois, 68, Belgian Olympic fencer (1952, 1956).
- Angelos Lambrou, 80, Greek Olympic sprinter (1928, 1932).
- Bernard Lievegoed, 87, Dutch psychiatrist.
- Jasu Patel, 68, Indian cricket player.
- Sir Robert Rex, 83, Niuean politician, premier (since 1974).
- Rube Walker, 66, American baseball player (Chicago Cubs, Brooklyn/Los Angeles Dodgers), lung cancer.

=== 13 ===
- Ellis Arnall, 85, American politician.
- Jens Bolling, 77, Norwegian actor and theatre director.
- Oscar Britt, 73, American gridiron football player (Washington Redskins).
- Eddie Daniels, 70, American baseball player.
- Mono Mohan Das, 82, Indian politician.
- K. C. Irving, 93, Canadian businessman.
- Luther Jeralds, 54, American football player (Dallas Texans, Edmonton Eskimos).
- Miskow Makwarth, 87, Danish actor.
- Aleksandar Tirnanić, 82, Yugoslav football player and manager.
- Cornelius Vanderbilt Whitney, 93, American businessman, film producer, and philanthropist.

=== 14 ===
- Watazumi Doso, 81, Japanese bamboo flutist.
- Kingo Machimura, 92, Japanese politician.
- William H. Oldendorf, 67, American neurologist, physician, and researcher.
- Louis Pauly, 86, French Olympic sailor (1928).
- Severino Rigoni, 78, Italian cyclist and Olympic silver medalist (1936).

=== 15 ===
- Sándor Ambrózy, 89, Hungarian sculptor.
- Sven Delblanc, 61, Swedish author and academic, cancer.
- Rosaire Gauthier, 88, Canadian politician, member of the House of Commons of Canada (1957-1958).
- Marcel Lachmann, 84, French Olympic field hockey player (1928, 1936).
- Yolande Laffon, 97, French actress.
- Otto Lington, 89, Danish composer, bandleader and violinist.
- Ennio Morlotti, 82, Italian painter.
- Dick Mulligan, 74, American baseball player (Washington Senators, Philadelphia Phillies, Boston Braves).
- Jim Musick, 82, American gridiron football player (Boston Braves/Redskins).
- Hermann Stövesand, 86, German actor.
- William Ware Theiss, 61, American costume designer (Star Trek, Harold and Maude, Bound for Glory), AIDS.

=== 16 ===
- Erica Brausen, 84, British art dealer and gallerist.
- Monk Dorsett, 83, College football and basketball player.
- Adil Guliyev, 70, Soviet-Azerbaijani fighter pilot and flying ace during World War II.
- Erik Johansson, 65, Swedish ice hockey player and Olympic medalist (1952).
- Anton Koolhaas, 80, Dutch journalist and writer.
- Gonzalo Rodríguez Martín-Granizo, 64, Spanish Navy admiral general.

=== 17 ===
- Serafima Amosova, 78, Soviet bomber commander during World War II.
- Günther Anders, 90, German philosopher.
- Dana Andrews, 83, American actor, congestive heart failure.
- Luis Child, Colombian Olympic swimmer (1948).
- George N. Craig, 83, American politician, Governor of Indiana (1953–1957).
- Andrew Jacobs Sr., 86, American politician, member of the U.S. House of Representatives (1949–1951).
- William Knecht, 62, American competition rower and Olympic champion (1960, 1964).
- Rinus Terlouw, 70, Dutch footballer and Olympian (1948, 1952), Alzheimer's disease.
- Keith Wiegard, 54, Australian rules footballer and Olympic water polo player (1960).
- Suren Yeremyan, 84, Soviet and Armenian historian and cartographer.

=== 18 ===
- Antonio Amurri, 67, Italian author, radio and television writer and lyricist.
- Vojin Bakić, 77, Yugoslav sculptor.
- Per Brandtmar, 74, Danish football player.
- Howard Cann, 97, American basketball player and coach.
- Mark Goodson, 77, American game show producer (The Price Is Right, I've Got a Secret, What's My Line?), pancreatic cancer.
- Clara Hale, 87, American humanitarian, complications from a stroke.
- Vladimir Semyonovich Semyonov, 81, Soviet diplomat, pneumonia.

=== 19 ===
- Gianni Brera, 73, Italian journalist and novelist, traffic collision.
- Howard Cann, 97, American Hall of Fame basketball coach (NYU Violets), and Olympic shot putter (1920).
- Abraham Charnes, 75, American mathematician and economist.
- Eric Cole, 86, British Army officer and cricketer.
- Louis Ducreux, 81, French actor, screenwriter and composer.
- Vladimir Grebennikov, 60, Soviet ice hockey player and Olympic medalist (1960).
- H. L. A. Hart, 85, English legal philosopher.
- Rosel H. Hyde, 92, American lawyer.
- Reggie Ingle, 89, English cricketer.

=== 20 ===
- A. Hamid Arief, 68, Indonesian actor.
- Peter Brocco, 89, American actor (Spartacus, One Flew Over the Cuckoo's Nest, Our Man Flint), heart attack.
- Bernard Dubourg, 47, French poet.
- Luciano Dal Falco, 67, Italian politician.
- Harald Huffmann, 84, German field hockey player and Olympic medalist (1936).
- Steve Ross, 65, American media executive, prostate cancer.
- Walter Zadek, 92, German-Israeli photographer.

=== 21 ===
- Stella Adler, 91, American actress and acting teacher, heart failure.
- Sybil Andrews, 94, English-Canadian artist.
- Philip Farkas, 78, American classical musician.
- David Hare, 75, American surrealist artist, aortic aneurysm.
- Albert King, 69, American blues guitarist and singer, heart attack.
- Nathan Milstein, 88, Ukrainian-American violinist, heart attack.
- Alex Quaison-Sackey, 68, Ghanaian diplomat.

=== 22 ===
- Bolaji Badejo, 39, Nigerian visual artist and actor (Alien), sickle-cell disease.
- Charles B. Black, 71, American basketball player.
- Harry Bluestone, 85, American violinist, tuberculosis.
- Rajendran Christie, 54, Indian field hockey player and Olympic medalist (1964, 1968).
- Brian Doyle, 62, English football player.
- Frederick William Franz, 99, American Jehovah's Witness leader.
- Gavin Hoare, 58, Australian rules footballer.
- William Janney, 84, American actor.
- Erik Lindén, 81, Swedish freestyle wrestler and Olympic medalist (1948).
- Italo Pedroncelli, 57, Italian Olympic alpine skier (1956, 1960, 1964).
- Ross Robinson, 86, Canadian Olympic speed skater (1928).
- Milo Sperber, 81, British actor, director and writer.
- Cornelio Villareal, 88, Filipino politician.
- Ted Willis, Baron Willis, 78, English screenwriter and playwright.

=== 23 ===
- Jadwiga Chojnacka, 87, Polish film actress.
- Lona Cohen, 79, American spy for the Soviet Union.
- Vincent Fourcade, 58, French interior designer, AIDS-related complications.
- Ivanhoe Gambini, 88, Italian painter.
- Eddie Hazel, 42, American funk guitarist and singer, liver failure.
- Frank Hekma, 81, American Olympic sailor (1928).
- Vyacheslav Kurennoy, 60, Russian Olympic water polo player (1956, 1960).
- Robert Marshak, 76, American physicist and educator.
- Hank Mizell, 69, American rockabilly singer, guitarist, and songwriter.
- Cyril Walters, 87, Welsh cricketer.
- Jack Wedgwood, 76, Australian rugby league footballer and RAAF officer.
- Stanislaw Zalewski, 85, Polish Olympic sailor (1936).

=== 24 ===
- Dursun Bozkurt, 67, Turkish Olympic alpine skier (1948).
- Bobby LaKind, 47, American conga musician, colon cancer.
- Micheline Luccioni, 62, French actress.
- Jack Nichols, 66, American basketball player (Washington Capitols, Tri-Cities Blackhawks / Milwaukee Hawks, Boston Celtics).
- Peyo, 64, Belgian comic artist and writer (The Smurfs), heart attack.
- Adela Sequeyro, 91, Mexican actress and journalist.
- Stella Skopal, 88, Croatian sculptor.
- William Trueheart, 74, American diplomat.
- Nicholas Joseph Walinski Jr., 72, American district judge (United States District Court for the Northern District of Ohio).

=== 25 ===
- Giuseppe Bonomi, 80, Italian football player coach.
- Ted Croker, 68, English footballer.
- Garrison H. Davidson, 88, American lieutenant general.
- Monica Dickens, 77, English author.
- Ed Donnelly, 60, American baseball player (Chicago Cubs).
- Sandra Dorne, 68, British actress.
- Richard Howard Ichord, Jr., 66, American politician, member of the U.S. House of Representatives (1961–1981).
- Helen Joseph, 87, South African anti-apartheid activist.

=== 26 ===
- Constance Carpenter, 88, English actress, stroke.
- Jack Crayston, 82, English football player and manager.
- Dancer's Image, 27, American thoroughbred racehorse.
- Edmund Davies, Baron Edmund-Davies, 86, British judge.
- Jan Flinterman, 73, Dutch racing driver.
- Tom Gorman, 67, American baseball player (New York Yankees, Kansas City Athletics).
- Edward Howard-Vyse, 87, British Army officer, horse rider and Olympic medalist (1936).
- Anthony Huxley, 72, British botanist.
- John George Kemeny, 66, Hungarian-American mathematician and computer scientist, heart failure.
- Nikita Magaloff, 80, Georgian-Russian pianist.
- Eve Poole, 67, New Zealand politician.
- María Bruguera Pérez, 79, Spanish anarcho-syndicalist.
- Hilde Wagener, 88, German-Austrian actress.

=== 27 ===
- Stephen Albert, 51, American composer, traffic collision.
- Dhananjay Bhattacharya, 70, Indian Bengali singer and composer.
- Kay Boyle, 90, American novelist.
- Alfred H. Clifford, 84, American mathematician.
- James Patterson Lyke, 53, American Roman Catholic prelate, cancer.
- János Móré, 82, Hungarian football player and manager.
- Eduardo Schneeberger, 81, Chilean footballer.

=== 28 ===
- Jorge Araya, 68, Chilean footballer.
- Jack Delinger, 66, American bodybuilder, heart attack.
- Nick Feher, 66, American football player (San Francisco 49ers, Pittsburgh Steelers).
- Vicente Gerbasi, 79, Venezuelan poet and writer.
- Nils Handal, 86, Norwegian politician.
- Sal Maglie, 75, American baseball player, pneumonia.
- Elfie Mayerhofer, 75, Austrian actress and singer.
- William G. McLoughlin, 70, American historian.
- Aimé Michel, 73, French science and spirituality writer and author.
- Milutin Pajević, 72, Montenegrin football player and manager.
- Daniella Perez, 22, Brazilian actress and dancer, murdered.
- Otto Lara Resende, 70, Brazilian journalist.
- Cardew Robinson, 75, English comedian, ischemic colitis.
- Vicente Rondón, 54, Venezuelan boxer.
- Chang Woon-soo, 64, South Korean football player and manager.
- Doug Wright, 75, English football player.

=== 29 ===
- Jaroslav Borovička, 61, Czech football player.
- Leon Gemmell, 71, Australian rules footballer.
- Bert Harper, 69, Australian rules footballer.
- Yahya Kanu, Sierra Leone military officer, president.
- James Napoli, 81, American mobster belonging to the Genovese crime family.
- Vivienne Segal, 95, American actress and singer, heart failure.
- Fidel Tricánico, 77, Uruguayan Olympic boxer (1936).

=== 30 ===
- Hans Bauer, 89, German Olympic cross country skier (1928).
- Phil H. Bucklew, 78, American gridiron football player.
- Dorothy Chacko, 88, American social worker, humanitarian and medical doctor.
- César Domela, 92, Dutch sculptor, painter, photographer, and typographer.
- Timothy S. Healy, 69, American Roman Catholic priest and academic, heart attack.
- Mihailo Lalić, 78, Montenegrin-Serbian writer.
- Romeo Muller, 64, American screenwriter and actor, heart attack.
- Chloethiel Woodard Smith, 82, American architect, cancer.
- Lusine Zakaryan, 55, Armenian singer, diabetes.

=== 31 ===
- Denis Barnett, 86, British RAF air marshal during World War II.
- Elene Gokieli, 74, Soviet-Georgian hurdler, sprinter and Olympian (1952).
- Dianne Jackson, 51, English animation director (The Snowman), cancer.
- Cyril Peacock, 63, British racing cyclist and Olympian (1952).
- Frank Ransley, 95, British WW1 flying ace.
- Bill Spears, 86, American football player.
- Kristján Vattnes, 76, Icelandic Olympic javelin thrower (1936).
- Guy Williams, 85, Canadian politician, member of the Canada Senate (1971-1982).
