= Formula One drivers from the Netherlands =

List of Formula One drivers from the Netherlands

- Drivers: 17
- Grands Prix: 556
- Entries: 574
- Starts: 533
- Best season finish: 1st (2021, 2022, 2023, 2024)
- Wins: 75
- Podiums: 142
- Pole positions: 51
- Fastest laps: 38
- Points: 3777.5
- First entry: 1952 Dutch Grand Prix
- First win: 2016 Spanish Grand Prix
- Latest win: 2026 Las Vegas Grand Prix
- Latest entry: 2026 Las Vegas Grand Prix
- 2026 drivers: Max Verstappen

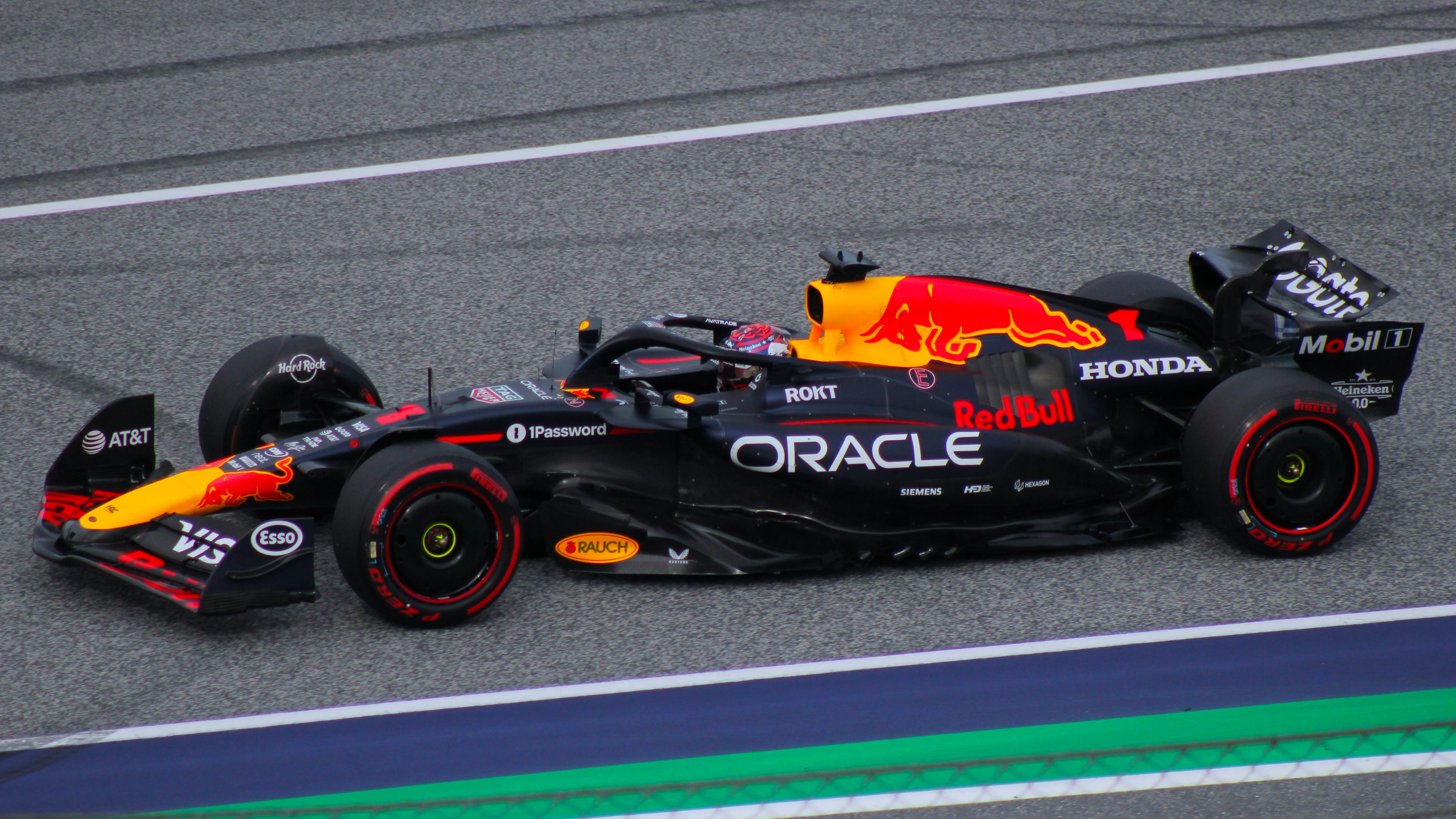
Verstappen driving for Red Bull at the 2025 Austrian Grand Prix

There have been seventeen Formula One racing drivers from the Netherlands who have taken part in Grand Prix races since 1952. Max Verstappen is the most successful Dutch driver to date, as the only one to have won a Formula One World Championship, to have won a race, or to have taken a pole position.

== Current drivers ==
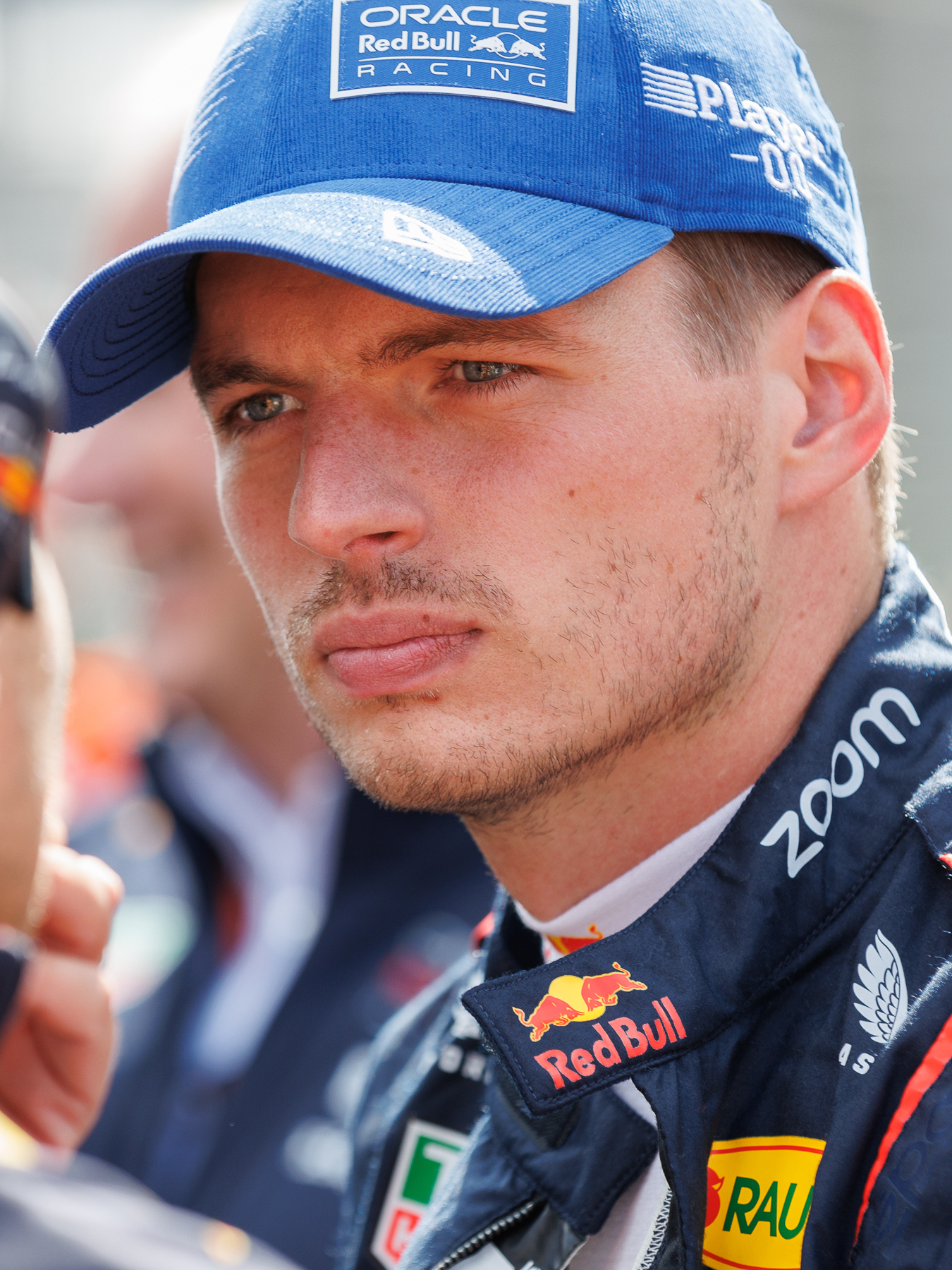
Max Verstappen 2026 season position: 2nd

Max Verstappen, son of former Formula One racing driver Jos Verstappen and Belgian former kart racing champion Sophie Kumpen, began his Formula One career in 2015, driving for Scuderia Toro Rosso, considered Red Bull Racing's secondary F1 team at the time. Aged 17 years and 166 days he became the youngest Formula One driver ever at that time.

From the 2016 Spanish Grand Prix, Verstappen was signed to drive with Red Bull Racing, and on 15 May 2016, by winning on his debut for Red Bull, he became the first Dutchman and the youngest driver at that time to win a Grand Prix, aged 18 years, 7 months and 15 days. On 12 December 2021, he also became the first Dutch driver to win a Formula One World Championship. He then continued to take the F1 World Champion title again in 2022, 2023, and 2024. Verstappen is due to drive for Red Bull Racing until the end of the 2028 season.

== Former drivers ==
=== 1950s and 1960s ===
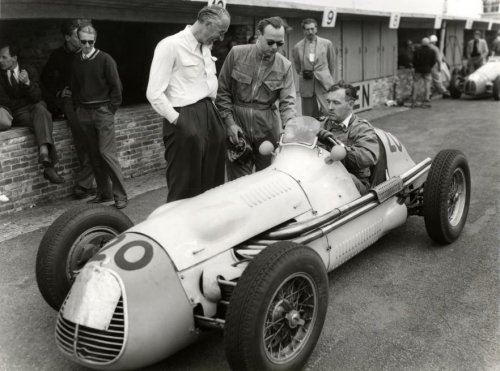
Jan Flinterman in his Maserati race-car at the 1952 Dutch Grand Prix

At the 1952 Dutch Grand Prix, Jan Flinterman and Dries van der Lof were the first Dutch drivers to participate in a Formula One race; for both drivers, it was their only one. In 1957, Carel Godin de Beaufort was the first regular Dutch Formula One driver, and the first Dutch driver to score points, driving in 31 races between 1957 and 1964, before crashing fatally at the 1964 German Grand Prix.

Three Dutch drivers were entered for the 1962 Dutch Grand Prix: besides Carel Godin de Beaufort, who drove the entire 1962 Formula One season, Ben Pon drove in his first and only Formula One Grand Prix as de Beaufort's teammate. Rob Slotemaker was entered for the race, but did not participate because his car was not ready in time.

=== 1970s and 1980s ===
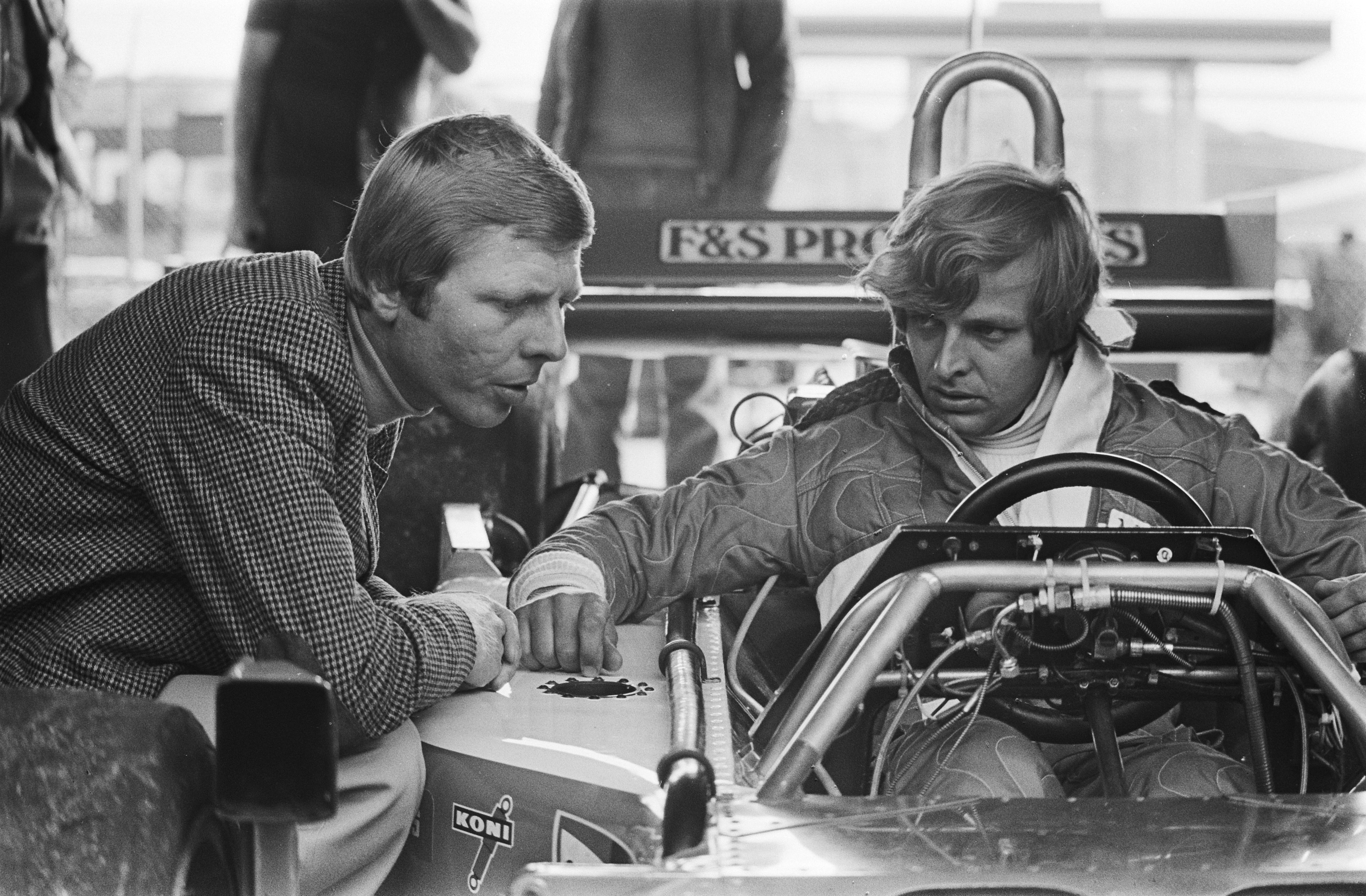
Gijs van Lennep (left) and Michael Bleekemolen at the 1977 Dutch Grand Prix

Gijs van Lennep, a successful sportscar driver and two-time winner of the Le Mans 24 Hours, entered 12 Formula One Grands Prix between 1971 and 1975 competing in 8 of them, in which he scored 2 career points. In 1975, Roelof Wunderink entered 6 Grands Prix for Ensign, but scored no points. Boy Hayje entered 8 races in 1976 and 1977, while Michael Bleekemolen entered 5 races in 1977 and 1978; both without scoring points.

At the 1979 Argentine Grand Prix, Jan Lammers started his Formula One career with Shadow. In 1980, he qualified a spectacular fourth place for the United States Grand Prix West at Long Beach in an ATS, but failed to score any points after a retirement. In 1982, after 39 Grands Prix, Jan Lammers retired from Formula One for a more successful career in sportscars, winning the 1988 24 Hours of Le Mans and the 1990 Daytona 24 Hours. In 1992, Lammers made a two-race comeback in Formula One for March, in Japan and Australia. These races marked his first Formula One appearance since 1982, which is a still-standing record for the longest gap between successive Grands Prix in Formula One as of September 2019. He was signed for the team in 1993 but the team went bankrupt before the season started.

In 1984, Huub Rothengatter made his debut for what was to become a career of 30 races over 3 years, although he scored no points. He would later become the manager of Jos Verstappen.

=== 1990s and 2000s ===
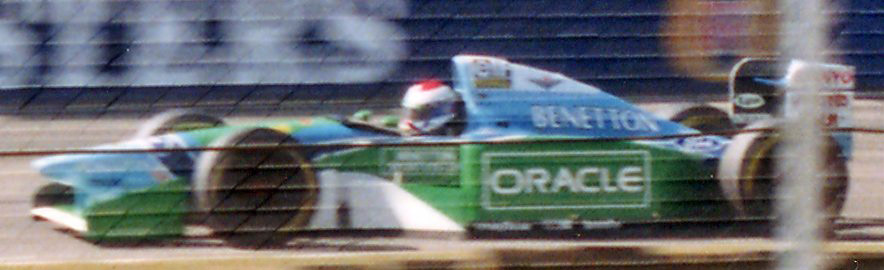
Jos Verstappen at the 1994 British Grand Prix

At the end of 1993 Jos Verstappen, after impressing in Formula Opel Lotus and Formula Three, was one of the most wanted upcoming drivers. He was eventually signed as test driver for Benetton for 1994, but made his debut in Brazil after regular driver JJ Lehto injured himself in pre-season testing. Verstappen became the default race driver in France, and would go on to score a podium in Hungary and Belgium. He was replaced for the last two races of 1994, and moved to Simtek in 1995. This would mark the beginning of a career mostly spent in mid-field and back-field teams such as Arrows, Tyrrell and Minardi. After a career in which he drove 107 Grands Prix, spanning 9 years and scoring 17 points, Verstappen retired after the 2003 Japanese Grand Prix.

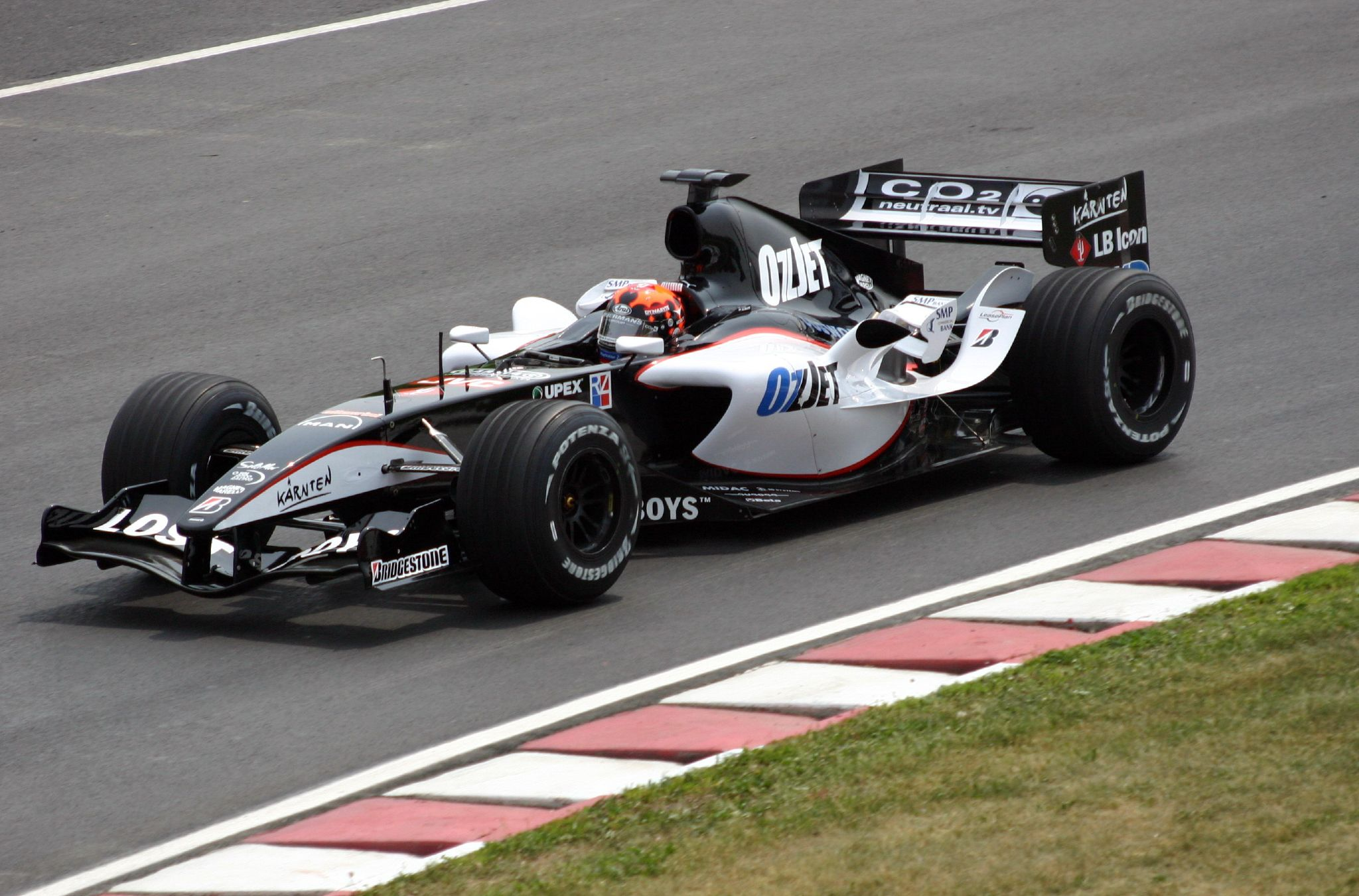
Christijan Albers in the Minardi, who, together with...

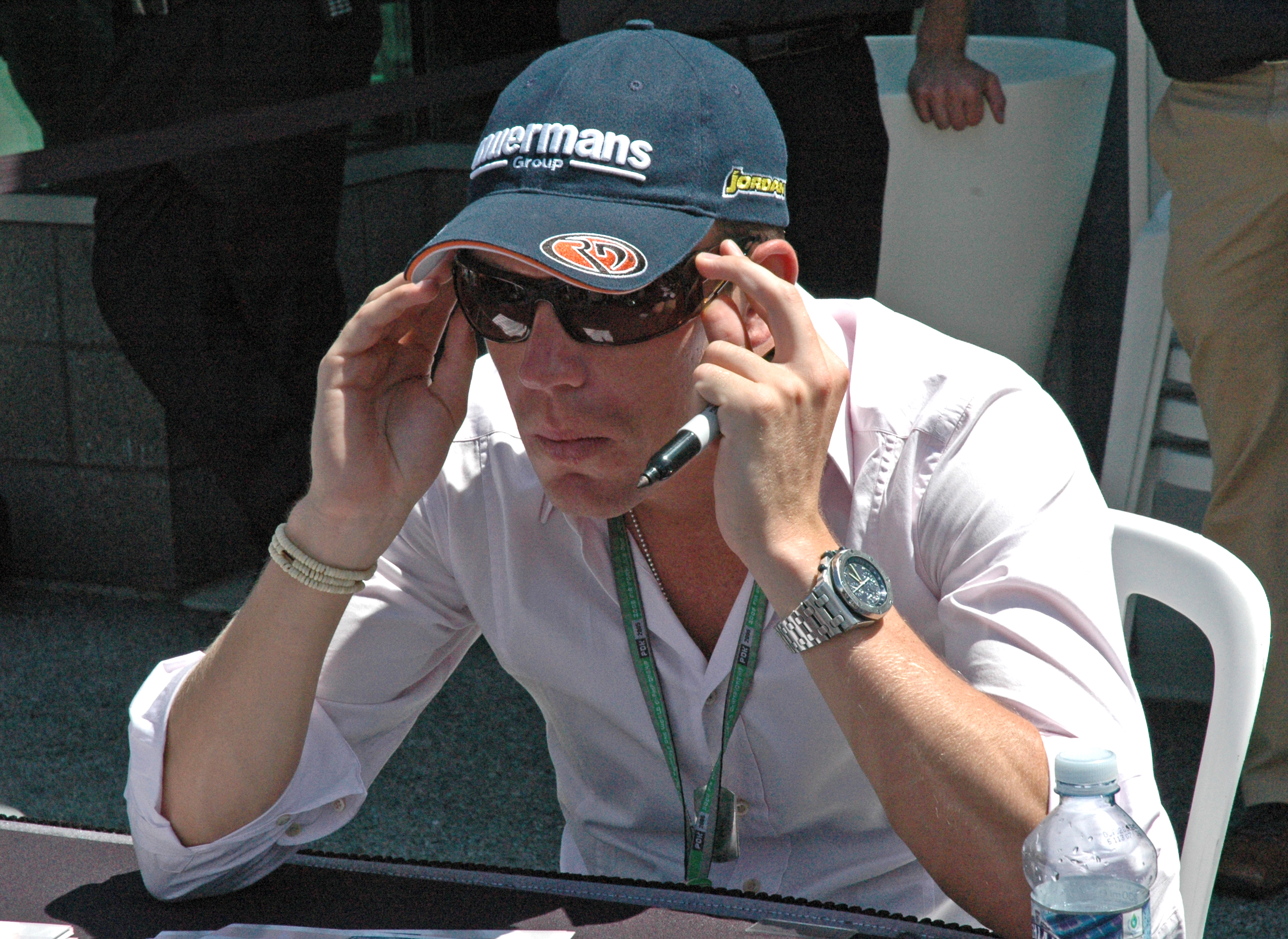
...Robert Doornbos, were teammates in 2005

After impressing in Formula Three and finishing Rookie of the Year International Formula 3000 with a victory in Belgium in 2004, Robert Doornbos was hired as Friday test driver for Jordan Grand Prix for the 2004 Chinese Grand Prix. Doornbos impressed as test driver for the final few races of the season, and was reappointed for the 2005 season, although he raced with a Monegasque racing license that year. At the 2005 German Grand Prix, he joined fellow Dutch driver Christijan Albers at Minardi, who debuted earlier that year as the team's regular driver. In 2006, Doornbos was appointed Friday test and reserve driver at Red Bull Racing, and would replace Christian Klien for the last 3 races of the season. After just 11 races over 4 years' time, his Formula One career ended as he went to drive the Champ Car World Series in 2007.

Following two successful seasons in DTM, Christijan Albers made his debut in the 2005 Australian Grand Prix for Minardi. Aside from a 5th point finish in the 6-car 2005 United States Grand Prix though, Albers's career was largely unsuccessful. He was released by Spyker after driving 46 races following the 2007 British Grand Prix. In July 2014, Caterham announced Christijan Albers as the team's new team principal, he was in charge until the teams collapse at the end of 2014.

=== 2010s and 2020s ===
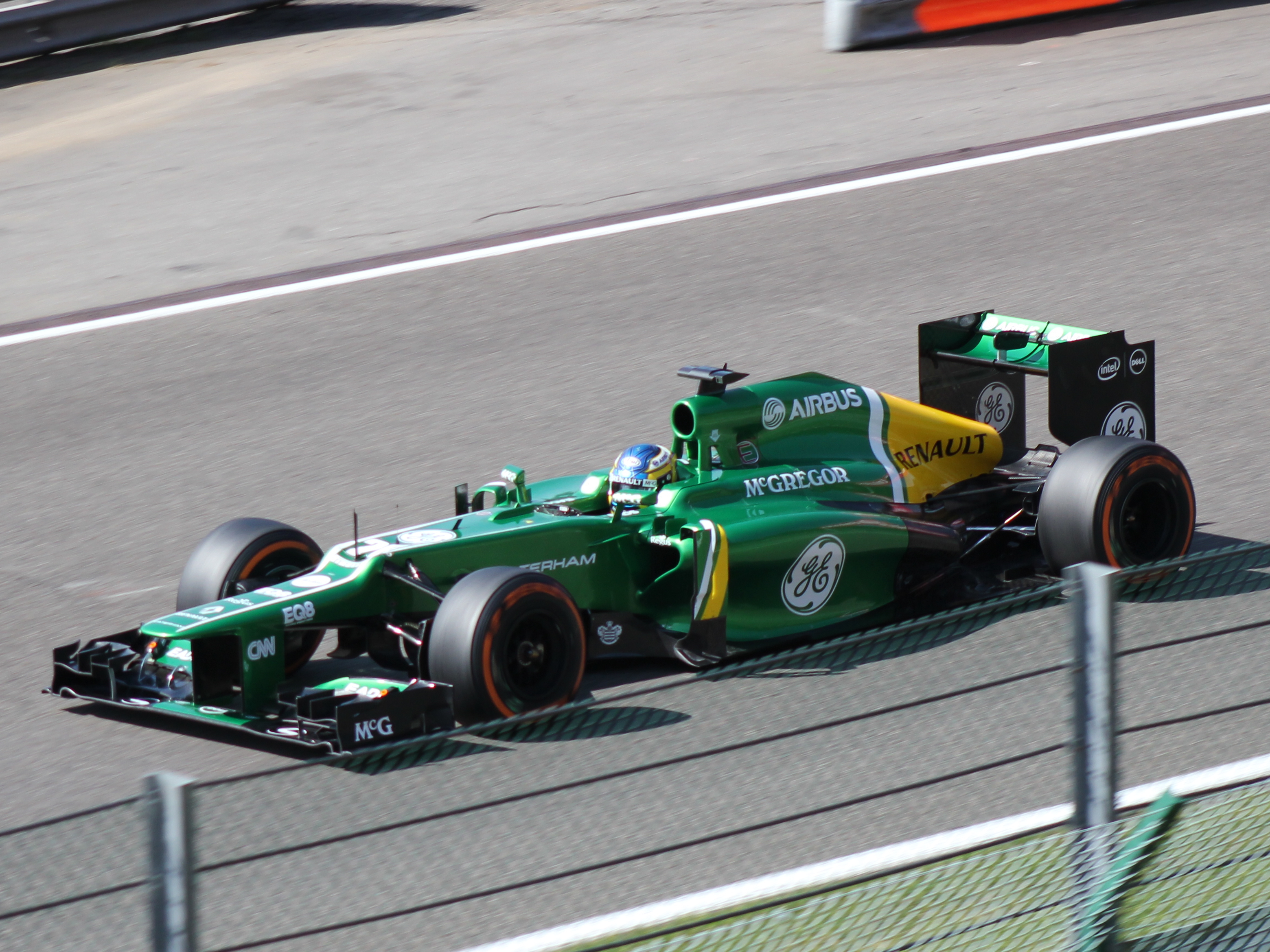
Giedo van der Garde at the 2013 Belgian Grand Prix

Giedo van der Garde's first steps into Formula One was when he was confirmed as test and reserve driver for 2007 for Super Aguri. However, due to contract conflicts with Spyker, who had also signed him as test and reserve driver, he ended up not taking part in any Grand Prix. Following good results in the GP2 Series, Van der Garde was signed as test and reserve driver for Caterham in Formula One, while racing for the team in GP2. After debuting for Caterham in 2013, Giedo van der Garde became Sauber's official test and reserve driver for 2014. He had a race contract with Sauber for 2015, but following a legal dispute with the team, did not drive in the season-opening Australian Grand Prix. Following the threat of follow-up action in Malaysia, all charges were dropped and van der Garde left Formula One.

In September 2022, Mercedes test driver Nyck de Vries debuted for Williams (in place of an ill Alex Albon) at the Italian Grand Prix, finishing ninth, scoring two points on his debut. In the 2023 season De Vries joined the AlphaTauri F1 team. De Vries was signed for Scuderia AlphaTauri for 2023 alongside Yuki Tsunoda, replacing Pierre Gasly who moved to Alpine. However, prior to the 2023 Hungarian Grand Prix, it was announced that De Vries would be replaced by Daniel Ricciardo for the remainder of the season due to underperforming in the first ten races.

== Timeline ==
Drivers	Active years	Entries	Wins	Podiums	Career points	Poles	Fastest laps	Championships
Jan Flinterman	1952	1	0	0	0	0	0	–
Dries van der Lof	1952	1	0	0	0	0	0	–
Carel Godin de Beaufort	1957–1964	31 (28 starts)	0	0	4	0	0	–
Ben Pon	1962	1	0	0	0	0	0	–
Rob Slotemaker	1962*	1 (0 starts)	0	0	0	0	0	–
Gijs van Lennep	1971, 1973–1975	10 (8 starts)	0	0	2	0	0	–
Roelof Wunderink	1975	6 (3 starts)	0	0	0	0	0	–
Boy Hayje	1976–1977	7 (3 starts)	0	0	0	0	0	–
Michael Bleekemolen	1977–1978	5 (1 start)	0	0	0	0	0	–
Jan Lammers	1979–1982, 1992	41 (23 starts)	0	0	0	0	0	–
Huub Rothengatter	1984–1986	30 (25 starts)	0	0	0	0	0	–
Jos Verstappen	1994–1998, 2000–2001, 2003	107 (106 starts)	0	2	17	0	0	–
Christijan Albers	2005–2007	46	0	0	4	0	0	–
Robert Doornbos	2006**	3	0	0	0	0	0	–
Giedo van der Garde	2013	19	0	0	0	0	0	–
Max Verstappen	2015–2026	254 (254 starts)	75	140	3748.5	51	38	4 (2021, 2022, 2023, 2024)
Nyck de Vries	2022–2023	11	0	0	2	0	0	–

* Was entered for the 1962 Dutch Grand Prix but did not participate because his car was not ready in time.

** Competed under Monegasque racing license in 2005.

== See also ==
- List of Formula One Grand Prix winners
- List of Formula One drivers
