= Tetsutarō =

- Gender: Male

Origin
- Origin: Japanese
- Meaning: Different meanings depending on the kanji used

Tetsutarō, Tetsutaro or Tetsutarou (written: 鉄太郎 or 哲太郎) is a masculine Japanese given name. Notable people with the name include:

- Tetsutaro Murano (村野 鉄太郎; 1929-2020), Japanese film director
- Tetsutaro Namae (生江 哲太郎; born 1909), Japanese diver
- Satō Tetsutarō (佐藤 鉄太郎; 1866–1942), Japanese military theorist and Imperial Japanese Navy admiral
