= Women in CNT in Francoist Spain =

Women in CNT in Francoist Spain were persecuted as part of state organized efforts to eliminate remaining leftist elements. Confederación Nacional del Trabajo (CNT) was formed in 1910, and from the onset it did not treat women equally to men inside the organization. This continued during the Second Spanish Republic, the Spanish Civil War and into Francoist Spain.

In the early Francoist period, women were punished as part of collective punishment efforts by the regime. Being a female relative of a male CNT militant could lead women being given long prisons or even the death penalty. Women were involved in clandestine guerrillas activities, normally by helping organize activities from prison or providing assistance from home. They generally were not part of groups, with a few exceptions. This was a result of a number of factors, including that most CNT women militants only became involved in armed resistance during the Spanish Civil War. Their presence contrasted from that of PCE who kept women out of armed resistance efforts.

Despite their occasional involvement in armed resistance, in more urban areas, women were discriminated when trying to join CNT meetings. They were told to return home, and were accused of making the movement soft with their feminine ways. While this was going on, women affiliated with CNT were involved in organizing strike action in the 1940s. CNT was severely repressed during the 1950s and 1960s. The organization eventually signed agreement with members of the Franco government to withdraw from active resistance. This left the organization adrift. When democracy finally did come, they were unprepared.

== Political background ==
Francoist Spain was a pseudo-fascist state whose ideology rejected what it considered the inorganic democracy of the Second Republic. It was an embrace of organic democracy, defined as a reassertion of traditional Spanish Roman Catholic values that served as a counterpoint to the Communism of the Soviet Union during the same period. It came into exist in 1939 following the end of the Spanish Civil War. Misogyny and heteronormativity where linchpins of fascism in Spain, where the philosophy revolved around patria and fixed gender roles that praised the role of strong male leadership.

In July 1936, the Spanish Civil War started with a military coup attempt launched from the Spanish enclave of Melilla. In October of that same year, Franco took over as the Generalissimo and Chief of State in Nationalist zones. On 19 April 1937, Catholic and Falangist parties were merged, making Falange Española Tradicionalista the official state party behind Nationalist lines. On 30 January 1938, the first National State Cabinet meeting was held, with the Spanish Civil War formally coming to an end on 1 April 1939 and an official government formalized on 8 August 1939.

The Franco regime banned all political parties and trade unions. The only permissible type organization was Falange, founded by José Antonio Primo de Rivera in 1933. An election was held in 1966, where people were given the option to affirm or deny Franco's leadership. With more voters than electors, Franco was affirmed as Head of State. Prince Juan Carlos was appointed as Franco's official successor in 1970, with Admiral Luis Carrero Blanco being the unofficial successor. Carrero Blanco was assassinated in 1973 by ETA. Franco died in November 1975.

== Confederación Nacional del Trabajo background ==
The Confederación Nacional del Trabajo was formed in 1910 as an anarcho-syndicalism organization. The framework of gender being part of the labor and anarchist union movement entered Confederación Nacional del Trabajo's platform between 1910 and 1913. At this time, when women internationally wanted to be involved in their own national organizations, they were locked out. This included leading feminists of the day like Clara Zetken, Rosa Luxemburg and Alexandra Kollantai who espoused the belief that the personal is political. They were forced into women's only organizations that had little power in the broader movement. The only opportunities for them to full integrate was through youth organizations or the formation of women only trade unions.

The 1918 Congress of CNT demonstrated the gender based tensions among anarchists in Spain. Men tried to use the Congress to assert their own power over women in both the public and private sphere. This was in large part because male anarchists did not want to see a power dynamic change which would result in a diminishment of their own status.

Much of the early history of this period is only known because of Teresa Claramunt, Soledad Gustavo, Maria Caro, Angela Graupera, key women in CNT in terms of creating a history of women's voices and documenting their activities in the pre-Republic and Republic periods. It was during this period from 1910 to 1920 that anarchist women eschewed CNT. A consequence of their rejection of CNT was the creation women's only organizations in Spain including Acción Femenina in 1921. Another consequence of male rejection of female involvement was that some women sympathetic to their cause were rejected from participating, even on the margins. Maria Dolores Rodríguez sympathized greatly with the movement, but her embrace of Catholicism and its organizational structure resulted in her being excluded from it.

== History ==
=== Interior ===
In the first days of the Francoist period, it was a crime for a mother, daughter, sister or wife of a "red", and this could be punished with long prison sentences or death. The punishment of being a female relative of a "red" male was resurrected between 1945 and 1947, when there was a surge in guerrilla activity. This resulted in a large number of rural women swelling the ranks of Spanish prisons, including in women's prisons in Madrid, Córdoba, Málaga and Segovia. They had received sentences of 20 to 30 years merely for feeding "red" male relatives. The PCE aligned Agrupación de Mujeres Antifascistas survived the war, managing to organize on the local level in the interior though their numbers and capabilities were very much depleted. Most of their activities were devoted to supporting PCE affiliated political prisoners in Francoist jails. This contrasted with the CNT aligned women's group, Mujeres Libres, whose leaders generally fled abroad to exile with the notable exception of Lucía Sánchez Saomil who went into internal exile. Mujeres Libres disappeared from the scene during the early Francoist period. This was largely a result of most of the women involved not having been involved in militant activities before the start of the Civil War.

In the Canary Islands in January 1937, women, including pregnant women, affiliated with the CNT as either members or family members of members were arrested, imprisoned and sometimes executed. For CNT connected women who gave birth in Canary Islands in the Civil War period, Nationalist forces would sometimes take their children to civil registries and officially change the names of their children.

Most of the resistance in Spain during the early Franco period was a result of guerrillas, who coordinated their activities in the interior both with political militants in exile and with militants in prison. Most of Spain's militant women who remained in Spain were in prison or had gone underground where they served as important figures in coordinating activities between all three groups. Prisons in this case proved invaluable for many militant women as they allowed them to rebuild their activist networks or create new networks. They were also one of the biggest sources of female resistance to the Franco regime by exercising daily resistance behind prison walls.

Women were generally not part of the founding of guerrilla groups operating in the 1940s. They were brought in later, as part of a disaffected class, through personal and political contacts. Almost all women involved with guerrilla groups were from rural areas and had family involved. This differed from the previous period, where many fighters came from the middle class and urban areas.

María Bruguera Pére connected with CNT militant, Aureliano Lobo, shortly after her release from prison in the 1940s. The pair would subsequently become involved, and moved into together. The relationship with Lobo gave Bruguera new energy to participate in the left wing struggle in Francoist Spain. She also continued as an activist inside the CNT.

Ma Ángels Alcolea y Pilar Molina organized a militant women's anarchist group in Valencia, drawing from former members of Mujeres Libres and meeting clandestinely in the 1940s. They called their group Unión de Mujeres Democráticas, and they had two primary goals: to aid prisoners and improve political awareness among women in the province. They produced propaganda, and shared their views by word of mouth, sharing their message with individuals they met in the streets and at the markets.

Zaragoza CNT militant J.M. faced a large amount of physical violence while in prison during the 1940s. As a result of this medical complications associated with the results of that violence, she had several miscarriages and ultimately could not have children.

In 1946, women political prisoners in Madrid's Las Ventas prison held a hunger strike to protest the poor quality of food they were provided. Women from socialist, communist and anarchist organizations came together behind bars to coordinate the strike. While they were successful in seeing food quality improved, prison officials subsequently reorganized the prison population to prevent further political collaboration within the confines of the prison.

While anarchists were more willing to accept women escaping Guardia Civil harassment by joining guerrillas, PCE was not as they believed that women being involved with these groups was not morally acceptable.

CNT aligned women faced difficulty. Male CNT members in leadership would not let them attend clandestine organizational meetings. When one woman was allowed to attend a meeting in Valencia as a women's representative, she was questioned by men there as to why she was there and shouldn't she be busy at home. Sometimes, men in CNT would accuse these women of making the organization less effective and more passive because of their "overwhelming feminine love."

In CNT's Juventudes Libertarias's magazine Ruta, women's participation was criticized as weakening men, "That same affection of a mother or of a companion, which should be an incentive for the man devoted fully to the struggle of a social nature and stimulate him to keep his combative spirit always latent, is, on the contrary, invoked continuously to incite him to abandon these activities [...] It is difficult to make them understand obstinate male brains, where men only conceive of love in an exclusivist way, locked within the narrow limits of family life, that there is another feeling, much broader and disinterested, more noble and elevated: love for humanity, which makes us sensitive to their sufferings and urges us to fight the society that generates them, sacrificing to the common good our own interests, not only material, but also affective."

During the pre-Francoist period, women would sometimes use riots instead of industrial action to try effect change. This method of individual rebellion of protesting economic conditions that impacted them entailed less risk than similar events by male counterparts because women were largely immune to consequences because they were women. The Franco regime wanted to suppress this type of female activity when they came into power as they saw it as subversive and an attempt to destabilize them. Unlike earlier periods, they imprisoned women and punished them for leading food riots. Despite this, during the 1940s, women would still occasionally engage in individually organized riots around issues linked to their daily survival. One such protest led by women in the 1940s occurred outside the Prosecutor's Office in the town of Teruel over bread and hunger. Overall, these were rare, especially in rural areas where there was a heavy police presence and a lack of anonymity. The biggest acts of individual rebellion by women in the 1940s would consequently be denunciations of the Guardia Civil for marking her male relatives as being involved with subversive groups like communists. Carmen Ciprés was the most famous of this type of subversive. In near daily raids around 1944 and 1945 where the police were searching for her partner CNT militant and guerrilla fighter José Ramiá Ciprés, Carmen Ciprés would say things like "Yourself if you want to go to bed right now, I do not care about anything. If you want to go to bed right now, I'll sleep with you." in response to inquiries as to who was sleeping in a still warm bed.

In the Region of Murcia, the first union led strike was led by picadoras del esparto women. Coordinating between former CNT and UGT members, they managed to get work stopped in three factories.

In 1945 and 1946, members of Sindicato Textil de la CNT were released from prison after having been sentenced in 1939 for belonging to a union. Upon their release, they were unable to find work. The factory they had worked in refused to hire them, and had also established their own union which they did not know what to do with. It was infiltrated in the elections of 1947 and 1950 by members of CNT.

The late 1950s and early 1960s saw severe repression of CNT by Franco's government that made activism even more difficult. María Bruguera Pérez participated in clandestine meetings of CNT. In 1976, Aureliano Lobo died and Bruguera threw herself into organizing the Health Committee of CNT. CNT was in a crisis during the 1960s. Earlier, members of the organization had signed and agreement with members of the Franco government to withdraw from active resistance in the regime. They had done so under the belief that democracy would soon emerge in Spain. This left the organization adrift. When democracy finally did come, they were unprepared.

=== Exterior ===
PSOE, UGT, PCE, CNT, Juventudes Socialistas de España (JSE), Movimiento Libertario Español (MLE) and the Moviment Socialista de Catalunya (MSC) continued their struggle in exile. From 1944 to 1960, the French city of Toulouse served as a major publishing hub for many of these organization's home in exile. The city of Toulouse itself would see around 40,000 exiles from these groups settle permanently in the city.

Sara Berenguer was a CNT affiliated miliciana in the Spanish Civil War. The poet was forced into exile in France after the war, where she wrote about her experiences and that of other women who fought with her.
