= Alonso Mariscal =

Mexican diver

Personal information
- Full name: Alonso Mariscal Abascal
- Born: 25 January 1914; Mexico City, Mexico
- Died: 31 January 1959 (aged 45); Acapulco, Mexico
- Height: 178 cm (5 ft 10 in)

Sport
- Sport: Diving

Alonso Mariscal Abascal (Note: In this Spanish name, the first or paternal surname is Mariscal and the second or maternal family name is Abascal.) (25 January 1914 – 31 January 1959) was a Mexican diver. He competed in the men's 3 metre springboard event at the 1932 Summer Olympics. He is the brother of Olympic divers Antonio Mariscal, Federico Mariscal, and Diego Mariscal.
