= Sooklek =

Suklek or Sooklek
- Created by: Prayoon Chanyavongs

In-universe information
- Species: human
- Gender: Male

Sooklek (Thai: ศุขเล็ก, RTGS: Suklek) is a Thai cartoon character created by Prayoon Chanyavongs in the likay style. He is characterized by a "jaunty feather stuck in a band around his head and carrying a sword in one hand." Prayoon's son was named after this character.

== History ==
Sooklek was first popularized as the titular role in the cartoon series Prince Chantarakob (จันทโครพ) and eventually became a public personality as creator Prayoon used the character in his satirical cartoons. His name means "happy, good fellow".

When Field Marshal Thanom Kittikachorn gave out an order for Prayoon to stop his political cartoons in 1968, Sooklek was drawn with lips sewn together. Another warning from the government brought about change in Sooklek as the sewn lips were replaced by a big mustache. Sooklek regained his mouth with the ouster of Thanom in 1973.

== Adaptation ==
An animation series in both 2D and 3D has been produced with Sooklek in the starring role. A commemorative book has also been launched by the Prayoon Foundation. The book is divided into two sections with the first focusing on Sooklek and the second about Prayoon's life and works.

To commemorate Prayoon's centenary, the Thailand Post launched a sheet of stamps. In addition, a local brand is producing T-shirts featuring Sooklek characters with part of the proceeds going to Prayoon Foundation.
