= Kazuo Kobayashi =

Japanese diver

Personal information
- Born: 1908; Osaka, Japan

Sport
- Sport: Diving

Kazuo Kobayashi (小林 一男, Kobayashi Kazuo; born 1908, date of death unknown) was a Japanese diver who competed in the 1932 Summer Olympics. In 1932 he finished sixth in the 3 metre springboard event.
