= Arthur Stott =

Canadian diver (1909–1993)

Personal information
- Born: November 21, 1909 Victoria, British Columbia, Canada
- Died: August 25, 1993 (aged 83) Shawnigan Lake, British Columbia
Medal record
Men's diving
British Empire Games
Bronze medal – third place	1930 Hamilton	3 m springboard

Arthur Harling Stott (November 21, 1909 – August 25, 1993) was a Canadian diver who competed in the 1932 Summer Olympics. He was born in Victoria, British Columbia.

In 1932, he finished eleventh in the 3 metre springboard event. At the 1930 Empire Games he won the bronze medals in the 3 metre springboard competition.
