= Antonio Mariscal =

Mexican lawyer and Olympic diver

Personal information
- Full name: Antonio Gerardo Mariscal Abascal
- Born: 2 July 1915 Mexico City, Mexico
- Died: 29 October 2010 (aged 95) Mexico City, Mexico

Sport
- Sport: Diving
Medal record
Representing Mexico
Central American and Caribbean Games
Gold medal – first place	1935 San Salvador	5m platform
Silver medal – second place	1935 San Salvador	3m springboard

Antonio Gerardo Mariscal Abascal (Note: In this Spanish name, the first or paternal surname is Mariscal and the second or maternal family name is Abascal.) (2 July 1915 – 29 October 2010) was a lawyer and Olympic-level diver from Mexico, who is considered by the Mexican Olympic Committee (COM) as a pioneer of Mexican sport.

In 1931, he won the National Diving Championship. He and his older brothers Alonso and Federico achieved Olympic history at the 1932 Olympics. They are the only three brothers to have competed in the same diving event. Effective with the 1948 Summer Olympics, the IOC has restricted that a country can have only two representatives in any single diving event. At the 1932 Olympics, he finished 12th in the 3m Springboard. His younger brother Diego competed at the 1948 Olympics.

At the 1935 Central American and Caribbean Games, he won the 5m Platform event and was second in 3m Springboard.

He served as president of the Mexican Swimming Federation from 1960–66, and is among the founders of bodies that oversee aquatic sports in the Americas (ASUA) and Central America/Caribbean (CCCAN).

In 1988, he received a Silver Olympic Order award from the International Olympic Committee. In 2008, he was bestowed a permanent COM membership.
