= Diving at the 1932 Summer Olympics – Men's 3 metre springboard =

Men's 3 metre springboard at the Games of the X Olympiad

Medalists
1st place, gold medalist(s)		Michael Galitzen	United States
2nd place, silver medalist(s)		Harold Smith	United States
3rd place, bronze medalist(s)		Richard Degener	United States

The men's 3 metre springboard, also reported as springboard diving, was one of four diving events on the Diving at the 1932 Summer Olympics programme. For the first time, the competition was held exclusively from the 3 metre springboard. Divers performed five compulsory dives – running pike dive forward, standing backward straight somersault, standing Mollberg (full gainer) with tuck, standing backward spring somersault with pike, standing forward screw – and five dives of the competitor's choice (different from the compulsory) for a total of ten dives. The competition was held on Monday 8 August 1932. Thirteen divers from seven nations competed.

== Results ==
Since there were only thirteen entries, instead of groups, a direct final was contested.

=== Final ===
Place	Diver	Nation	Score
1st place, gold medalist(s)	Michael Galitzen	United States	161.38
2nd place, silver medalist(s)	Harold Smith	United States	158.54
3rd place, bronze medalist(s)	Richard Degener	United States	151.82
4	Alfred Phillips	Canada	134.64
5	Leo Esser	Germany	134.30
6	Kazuo Kobayashi	Japan	133.76
7	Émile Poussard	France	128.66
8	Tetsutaro Namae	Japan	125.18
9	Josef Staudinger	Austria	124.50
10	Federico Mariscal	Mexico	111.98
11	Arthur Stott	Canada	110.22
12	Antonio Mariscal	Mexico	97.28
13	Alonso Mariscal	Mexico	88.32

== Sources ==
- Xth Olympiad Committee of the Games of Los Angeles, U.S.A. 1932, Ltd. (1933). "The Games of the Xth Olympiad Los Angeles 1932 - Official Report" (PDF). Xth Olympiad Committee of the Games of Los Angeles, U.S.A. 1932, Ltd. pp. p. 638.
