= Diego Mariscal =

Mexican diver (1925–2005)

Personal information
- Full name: Diego Mariscal Abascal
- Born: 2 December 1925 Mexico City, Mexico
- Died: 11 June 2005 (aged 79)

Sport
- Sport: Diving

Diego Mariscal Abascal (2 December 1925 – 11 June 2005) was a Mexican diver. He competed in two events at the 1948 Summer Olympics. His brothers are Olympians Alonso Mariscal, Antonio Mariscal, and Federico Mariscal.
