= Richard Degener =

American diver (1912–1995)

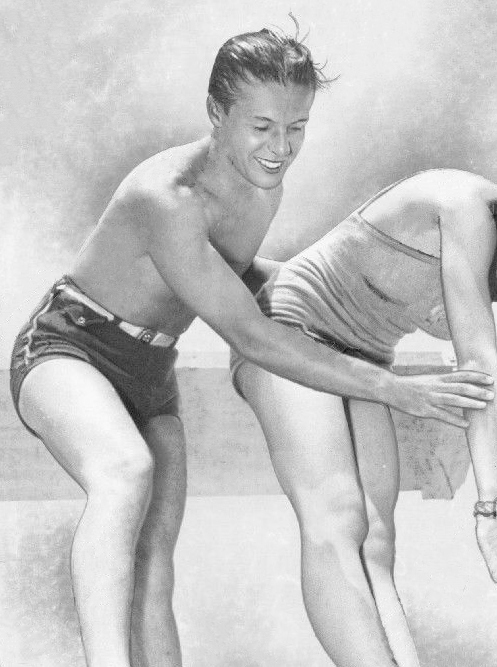
- Degener in 1938

Personal information
- Full name: Richard Kempster Degener
- Nationality: American
- Born: March 14, 1912 Detroit, Michigan, U.S.
- Died: August 24, 1995 (aged 83) Grand Rapids, Michigan, U.S.
- Education: University of Michigan

Sport
- Country: United States
- Sport: Diving; University of Michigan
- Club: Detroit Athletic Club
- Coached by: Matt Mann II; Michigan; Dick Papenguth; Olympics

Achievements and titles
- Olympic finals: 1932, 1936
Medal record
Representing the United States
Olympic Games
Gold medal – first place	1936 Berlin	3 m springboard
Bronze medal – third place	1932 Los Angeles	3 m springboard

Richard Kempster Degener (March 14, 1912 – August 24, 1995) was an American diver and NCAA titlist who swam for the University of Michigan and the Detroit Athletic Club. He won a bronze and a gold medal in the 3 m springboard at the 1932 and 1936 Berlin Olympics, respectively. His Olympic diving coach, Dick Papenguth labelled Degener “the greatest of all divers.”

== Swimming career ==
At age 10, Degener began his swimming career when his father August, an early Ford Motor employee, paid ten dollars for the Detroit Yacht Club swimming coach to give him diving lessons. He told news accounts that he stopped lessons after learning the jack knife and front and back somersaults, but knew he needed to continue training after taking only third place among three entrants in one of his first competitions.

Degener graduated Detroit Central High School around 1929 where he first established himself as a diving champion. At the University of Michigan, where he graduated in 1934, he won back-to-back NCAA championships as an upperclassman in his specialty, the three-meter springboard, in 1933 and 1934.

Degener introduced the full layout in which his body seemed to soar, lazy-like and graceful in the air. This astonished the diving world and caused a buzz of admiration around the pool. He was one of the greatest divers in the 1930's, known for very tight turns and a graceful execution. He was a focused athlete, and noted, "If there is one thing I've gotten out of sports, it's that I learned to be intense and to do the job."

== Michigan swimming ==
Degener never lost a diving contest in college during the three years he represented Michigan from 1931 to 1934 as he took the Big Ten Conference and National Collegiate championship. At Michigan, he was managed by Hall of Fame Head Coach Matt Mann II, who had mentored a number of Olympic divers and swimmers and had formerly coached at the Detroit Athletic Club, where Degener's diving coach was former Olympic diving medalist Clarence Pinkston. After his swimming career at Michigan, he swam exclusively for the Detroit Athletic Club until retiring from competition.

== AAU swimming ==
In AAU competition, Dick was unbeaten for years as he won 14 national indoor and outdoor diving titles. He won four outdoor AAU Nationals in the high board representing the Detroit Athletic Club, and three NCAA titles for the University of Michigan. At the Indoor AAUs, he won five straight three-meter springboard titles and two one-meter titles. His record, particularly his remaining undefeated in high board diving has never been matched in modern diving competition. After his 1936 gold medal two years after graduating Michigan, Degener made the decision to stop competitive diving. As he had been an elite competitor for over five years, he believed it was time to stop competing while his skills could remain near their peak.

== Professional years ==
Degener later turned professional with the Billy Rose Aquacade when it opened in Cleveland, and was able to focus on exhibitions, rather than the rigors of competition. A handsome athlete with a striking physical presentation and a considerable degree of celebrity and recognition, he later worked as a clothing salesman, and a manufacturer's representative.

=== Honors ===
After college graduation in 1934, he became a member of the University of Michigan Hall of Honor, and in an uncommon distinction in 1971, was inducted into the International Swimming Hall of Fame.

Degener gained considerable notoriety and recognition in his hometown of Detroit during his lifetime. He was honored in April 1936, along with many other sports champions and standouts at a Detroit banquet, which was the first celebration of Champions Day. In July, the White House presented a plaque to Detroit honoring it as the City of Champions. The plaque had five "medallions" featuring athletes, which were originally a baseball, football, and hockey player, a power boat racer, and a boxer. As Joe Louis had been knocked out shortly before the presentation, at the last minute the boxer was changed to a diver, to represent Degener.

=== Death ===
He died at the age of 83 on August 24, 1995, of Parkinson's disease in Grand Rapids. He was survived by his wife Eileen, a daughter, Sally and a son. According to his son, though modest about his own accomplishments, he was a "tremendous fan" of what 1936 Olympic teammate Jessie Owens had accomplished. Two of his Hall of Fame coaches Matt Mann from University of Michigan and Clarence Pinkston, a Detroit Athletic Club coach and former Olympic diver considered Degener, "the very best of his era.”

== See also ==
- List of members of the International Swimming Hall of Fame
- University of Michigan Athletic Hall of Honor
