= Leo Esser =

German diver

Personal information
- Born: February 17, 1907 Düsseldorf, Germany

Sport
- Sport: Diving
Medal record
Representing Germany
European Championships
Bronze medal – third place	1934 Magdeburg	3m springboard

Leo Esser (born February 17, 1907, date of death unknown) was a German diver who competed in the 1932 Summer Olympics and in the 1936 Summer Olympics. In 1932 he finished fifth in the 3 metre springboard event. Four years later he finished sixth in the 3 metre springboard competition.
