= Émile Poussard =

French diver (1909–1992)

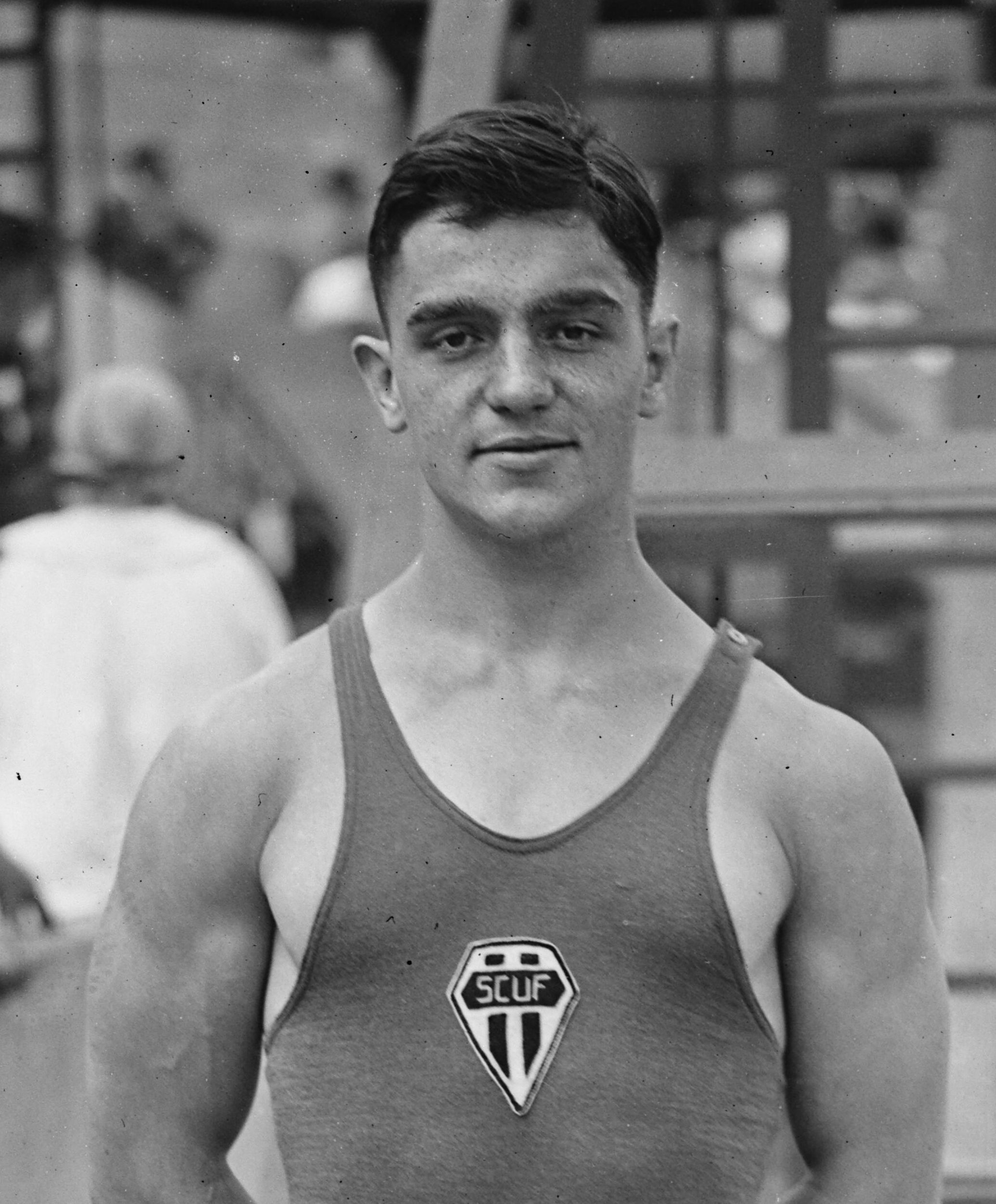
- Émile Poussard in 1929

Personal information
- Born: 23 November 1909; Paris, France
- Died: 10 December 1992 (aged 83); Paris, France

Sport
- Sport: Diving

Émile Poussard (23 November 1909 – 10 December 1992) was a French diver who competed in the 1932 Summer Olympics. In 1932 he finished seventh in the 3 metre springboard event.
