= Gavin Hoare =

Australian rules footballer

Personal information
- Full name: Gavin Hoare
- Born: 4 July 1934
- Died: 22 December 1992 (aged 58)
- Original team: Mentone
- Height: 175 cm (5 ft 9 in)
- Weight: 76 kg (168 lb)

Playing career^{1}
Years	Club	Games (Goals)
1952–53	Richmond	8 (3)
- ^{1} Playing statistics correct to the end of 1953.

Gavin Hoare (4 July 1934 – 22 December 1992) was a former Australian rules footballer who played with Richmond in the Victorian Football League (VFL).
