= Jim Reid (footballer, born 1912) =

Australian rules footballer (1912–1992)

Personal information
- Full name: James Bruce Reid
- Born: 20 December 1912; Katanning, Western Australia
- Died: 10 December 1992 (aged 79); Bendigo, Victoria
- Height: 191 cm (6 ft 3 in)
- Weight: 99 kg (218 lb)

Playing career^{1}
| Years | Club | Games (Goals) |
| 1941–42 | North Melbourne | 12 (3) |
- ^{1} Playing statistics correct to the end of 1942.

James Bruce Reid (20 December 1912 – 10 December 1992) was an Australian rules footballer who played for North Melbourne in the Victorian Football League (VFL).

Born on 20 December 1912 in Katanning, Western Australia, James Bruce Reid was the son of William Bruce Reid (1882–1957) and Lorna Mary Reid, née Innes (1878–1929). The Reid family relocated to Victoria in the late 1920s and settled in the Bendigo region.

During World War II, Jim Reid also served in the Royal Australian Navy.
