= 1952 Dutch Grand Prix =

← Previous race	Next race →

Race details
- Date: 17 August 1952
- Official name: III Grote Prijs van Nederland
- Location: Circuit Zandvoort; Zandvoort, Netherlands
- Course: Permanent racing facility
- Course length: 4.193 km (2.605 miles)
- Distance: 90 laps, 377.370 km (234.487 miles)
- Weather: Rainy

Pole position
Driver	(Italy) Alberto Ascari	Ferrari
- Time: 1:46.5

Fastest lap
Driver	(Italy) Alberto Ascari	Ferrari
- Time: 1:49.8 on lap 89

Podium
First	(Italy) Alberto Ascari	Ferrari
Second	(Italy) Giuseppe Farina	Ferrari
Third	(Italy) Luigi Villoresi	Ferrari

The 1952 Dutch Grand Prix was a Formula Two race held on 17 August 1952 at the Circuit Zandvoort. It was race 7 of 8 in the 1952 World Championship of Drivers, in which each Grand Prix was run to Formula Two rules rather than the Formula One regulations normally used. The 90-lap race was won by Ferrari driver Alberto Ascari after he started from pole position, meaning that he had won the championship for the first time in his career, as well as becoming the second italian in the first three years to become Formula One World Champion. His teammates Giuseppe Farina and Luigi Villoresi finished in second and third places. Ascari overtook Fangio's record for the most race wins, scoring his seventh at this race.

== Race report ==
Luigi Villoresi, absent from the World Championship since the final round of the 1951 season, returned to the Ferrari lineup for the Dutch Grand Prix, replacing Piero Taruffi, alongside regulars Nino Farina and Alberto Ascari, the latter of which had clinched the Drivers' Championship title two weeks previously. Charles de Tornaco also drove a Ferrari at Zandvoort, on behalf of the Ecurie Francorchamps team. Gordini entered the same three drivers from the previous event, the French trio of Behra, Manzon and Trintignant, while Belgian driver Paul Frère drove an Ecurie Belge-entered Simca-Gordini. The HWM team partnered Britons Lance Macklin and Duncan Hamilton with the local driver Dries van der Lof. The only other Dutch driver on the grid was Jan Flinterman, who took part in a Maserati for Escuderia Bandeirantes alongside Chico Landi and Gino Bianco. The works Maserati team were once again absent from the grid, following an unsuccessful appearance in Germany. The field was completed by the Connaught of Ken Downing, Mike Hawthorn's Cooper-Bristol, Ken Wharton's Frazer-Nash and Stirling Moss in an ERA.

The Ferraris once again dominated qualifying, with Ascari taking his fourth pole position of the season, ahead of Farina in second. Mike Hawthorn shone in practice, gaining a front-row start for his little Cooper-Bristol, relegating Villoresi's Ferrari to the second row of the grid. Trintignant's Gordini completed row two, while his teammates Behra and Manzon were joined on the third row by Wharton in the sole Frazer-Nash.

Hawthorn fought valiantly with the Ferraris for five laps before they resumed their usual formation. Ascari led Farina and Villoresi home in another Ferrari procession, with Hawthorn gaining fourth place, two laps behind the Ferrari trio. This was Ascari's fifth consecutive victory (along with a fifth consecutive fastest lap), and his seventh victory in total, breaking Fangio's record for the most World Championship race wins. The Gordinis of Manzon and Trintignant finished a further lap behind Hawthorn, taking fifth and sixth place, respectively. Stirling Moss got up as high as seventh in the ERA before having to retire.

Farina's podium finish took him to second place in the Drivers' Championship standings, overtaking the absentee Taruffi. Swiss driver Rudi Fischer, also not present at the Dutch Grand Prix, remained in fourth, while Mike Hawthorn's result took him to fifth in the standings, level on points with Fischer.

== Entries ==
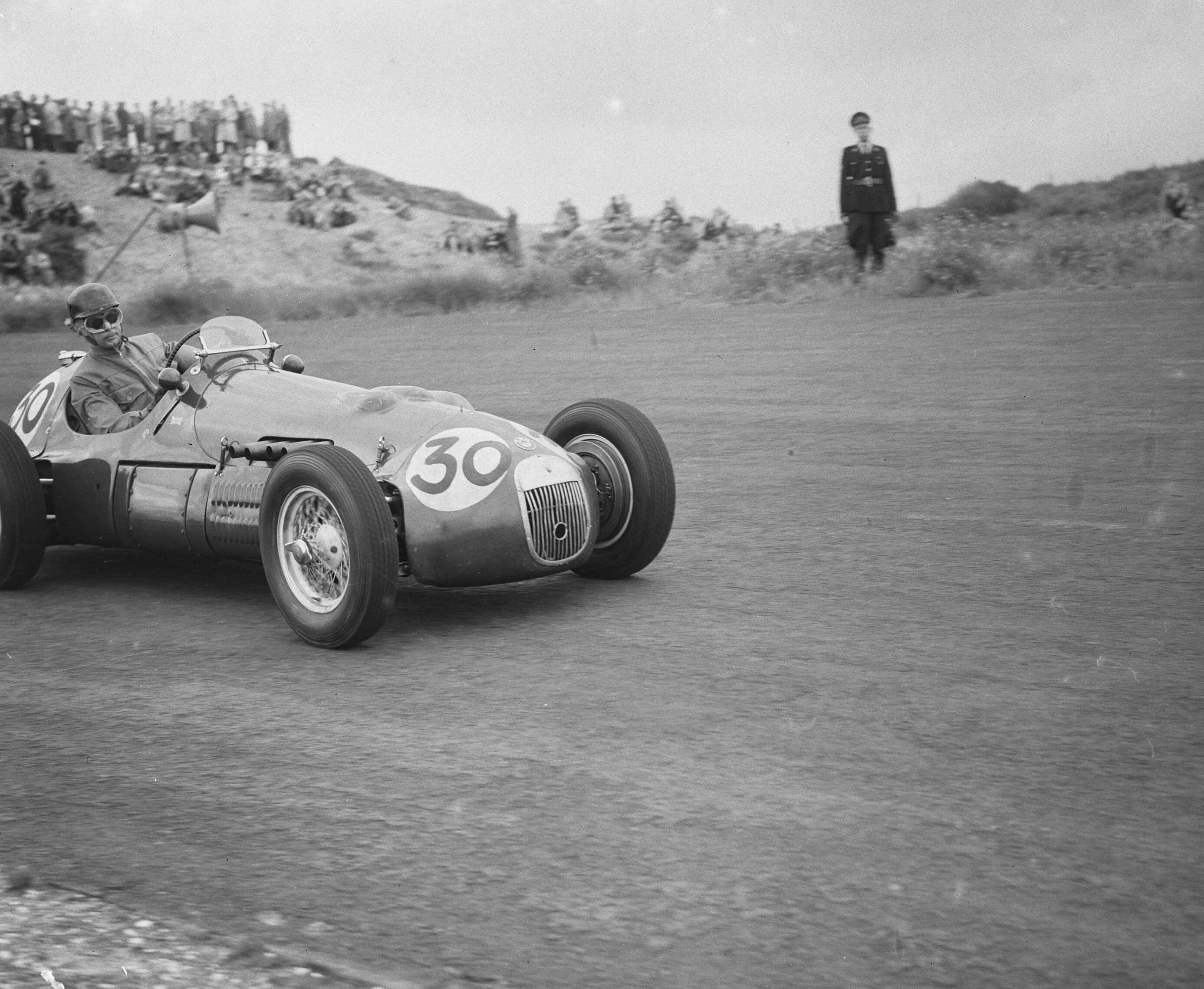
Dries van der Lof contested the race in an HWM-Alta

No	Driver	Entrant	Constructor	Chassis	Engine	Tyre
2	(Italy) Alberto Ascari	Scuderia Ferrari	Ferrari	Ferrari 500	Ferrari Type 500 2.0 L4	P
4	(Italy) Nino Farina	Scuderia Ferrari	Ferrari	Ferrari 500	Ferrari Type 500 2.0 L4	P
6	(Italy) Luigi Villoresi	Scuderia Ferrari	Ferrari	Ferrari 500	Ferrari Type 500 2.0 L4	P
8	(France) Jean Behra	Equipe Gordini	Gordini	Gordini T16	Gordini 20 2.0 L6	E
10	(France) Robert Manzon	Equipe Gordini	Gordini	Gordini T16	Gordini 20 2.0 L6	E
12	(France) Maurice Trintignant	Equipe Gordini	Gordini	Gordini T16	Gordini 20 2.0 L6	E
14	(Belgium) Paul Frère^{1}	Ecurie Belge	Simca-Gordini	Simca-Gordini T15	Gordini 1500 1.5 L4	E
16	(Brazil) Chico Landi^{2}	Escuderia Bandeirantes	Maserati	Maserati A6GCM	Maserati A6G 2.0 L6	P
18	(Brazil) Gino Bianco^{3}	Escuderia Bandeirantes	Maserati	Maserati A6GCM	Maserati A6G 2.0 L6	P
20	(Netherlands) Jan Flinterman	Escuderia Bandeirantes	Maserati	Maserati A6GCM	Maserati A6G 2.0 L6	P
22	(United Kingdom) Ken Downing	Ken Downing	Connaught-Lea Francis	Connaught A	Lea Francis 2.0 L4	D
24	(Belgium) Charles de Tornaco^{4}	Ecurie Francorchamps	Ferrari	Ferrari 500	Ferrari Type 500 2.0 L4	E
26	(United Kingdom) Lance Macklin	HW Motors	HWM-Alta	HWM 52	Alta F2 2.0 L4	D
28	(United Kingdom) Duncan Hamilton	HW Motors	HWM-Alta	HWM 52	Alta F2 2.0 L4	D
30	(Netherlands) Dries van der Lof	HW Motors	HWM-Alta	HWM 52	Alta F2 2.0 L4	D
32	(United Kingdom) Mike Hawthorn	Leslie D. Hawthorn	Cooper-Bristol	Cooper T20	Bristol BS1 2.0 L6	D
34	(United Kingdom) Ken Wharton	Scuderia Franera	Frazer Nash-Bristol	Frazer Nash 421	Bristol BS1 2.0 L6	D
36	(United Kingdom) Stirling Moss	English Racing Automobiles Ltd.	ERA	ERA G	ERA 1.5 L6	D

^1 — Paul Frère qualified and raced in the #14 Simca-Gordini. Johnny Claes, who was also entered in the same car, did not participate in the Grand Prix after being fired.
^2 — Chico Landi qualified and drove 43 laps of the race in the #16 Maserati. Jan Flinterman, whose own vehicle had already retired, took over the car for a further 40 laps of the race.
^3 — Gino Bianco qualified and raced in the #14 Simca-Gordini. Eitel Cantoni, who was also entered in the same car, did not participate in the Grand Prix after being fired.
^4 — Charles de Tornaco qualified and raced in the #24 Ferrari. Louis Rosier had initially entered the Grand Prix in a separate car bearing the same number, but later cancelled his entry.

== Classification ==
=== Qualifying ===
Pos	No	Driver	Constructor	Time	Gap
1	2	(Italy) Alberto Ascari	Ferrari	1:46.5	–
2	4	(Italy) Nino Farina	Ferrari	1:48.6	+ 2.1
3	32	(United Kingdom) Mike Hawthorn	Cooper-Bristol	1:51.6	+ 5.1
4	6	(Italy) Luigi Villoresi	Ferrari	1:51.8	+ 5.3
5	12	(France) Maurice Trintignant	Gordini	1:53.0	+ 6.5
6	8	(France) Jean Behra	Gordini	1:54.5	+ 8.0
7	34	(United Kingdom) Ken Wharton	Frazer-Nash-Bristol	1:54.7	+ 8.2
8	10	(France) Robert Manzon	Gordini	1:54.8	+ 8.3
9	26	(United Kingdom) Lance Macklin	HWM-Alta	1:55.2	+ 8.7
10	28	(United Kingdom) Duncan Hamilton	HWM-Alta	1:55.8	+ 9.3
11	14	(Belgium) Paul Frère	Simca-Gordini-Gordini	1:58.2	+ 11.7
12	18	(Brazil) Gino Bianco	Maserati	1:58.4	+ 11.9
13	22	(United Kingdom) Ken Downing	Connaught-Lea-Francis	1:58.6	+ 12.1
14	30	(Netherlands) Dries van der Lof	HWM-Alta	1:59.4	+ 12.9
15	20	(Netherlands) Jan Flinterman	Maserati	2:01.8	+ 15.3
16	16	(Brazil) Chico Landi	Maserati	2:02.1	+ 15.6
17	24	(Belgium) Charles de Tornaco	Ferrari	2:03.7	+ 17.2
18	36	(United Kingdom) Stirling Moss	ERA	2:04.5	+ 18.0

=== Race ===
Pos	No	Driver	Constructor	Laps	Time/Retired	Grid	Points
1	2	(Italy) Alberto Ascari	Ferrari	90	2:53:28.5	1	9^{a}
2	4	(Italy) Nino Farina	Ferrari	90	+ 40.1	2	6
3	6	(Italy) Luigi Villoresi	Ferrari	90	+ 1:34.4	4	4
4	32	(United Kingdom) Mike Hawthorn	Cooper-Bristol	88	+ 2 laps	3	3
5	10	(France) Robert Manzon	Gordini	87	+ 3 laps	8	2
6	12	(France) Maurice Trintignant	Gordini	87	+ 3 laps	5	
7	28	(United Kingdom) Duncan Hamilton	HWM-Alta	85	+ 5 laps	10	
8	26	(United Kingdom) Lance Macklin	HWM-Alta	84	+ 6 laps	9	
9	16	(Brazil) Chico Landi (Netherlands) Jan Flinterman	Maserati	83	+ 7 laps	16	
Ret	34	(United Kingdom) Ken Wharton	Frazer-Nash-Bristol	76	Wheel bearing	7	
Ret	36	(United Kingdom) Stirling Moss	ERA	73	Engine	18	
NC	30	(Netherlands) Dries van der Lof	HWM-Alta	70	Not Classified	14	
Ret	22	(United Kingdom) Ken Downing	Connaught-Lea-Francis	27	Oil pressure	13	
Ret	24	(Belgium) Charles de Tornaco	Ferrari	19	Engine	17	
Ret	14	(Belgium) Paul Frère	Simca-Gordini-Gordini	15	Clutch	11	
Ret	8	(France) Jean Behra	Gordini	10	Electrical	6	
Ret	20	(Netherlands) Jan Flinterman	Maserati	7	Differential	15	
Ret	18	(Brazil) Gino Bianco	Maserati	4	Axle	12	

Notes

- ^a – Includes 1 point for fastest lap

== Shared drive ==
- Car #16: Landi (43 laps) then Flinterman (40 laps)

== Championship standings after the race ==
- **Bold text** indicates the World Champion.

Drivers' Championship standings

	Pos	Driver	Points
	1	(Italy) **Alberto Ascari**	36 (45)
1	2	(Italy) Nino Farina	24
1	3	(Italy) Piero Taruffi	22
	4	(Switzerland) Rudi Fischer	10
2	5	(United Kingdom) Mike Hawthorn	10

- Note: Only the top five positions are included. Only the best 4 results counted towards the Championship. Numbers without parentheses are Championship points; numbers in parentheses are total points scored.

Previous race: 1952 German Grand Prix	FIA Formula One World Championship; 1952 season	Next race: 1952 Italian Grand Prix
Previous race: 1951 Dutch Grand Prix	Dutch Grand Prix	Next race: 1953 Dutch Grand Prix
