= Bernard Dubourg =

French poet and professor of philosophy

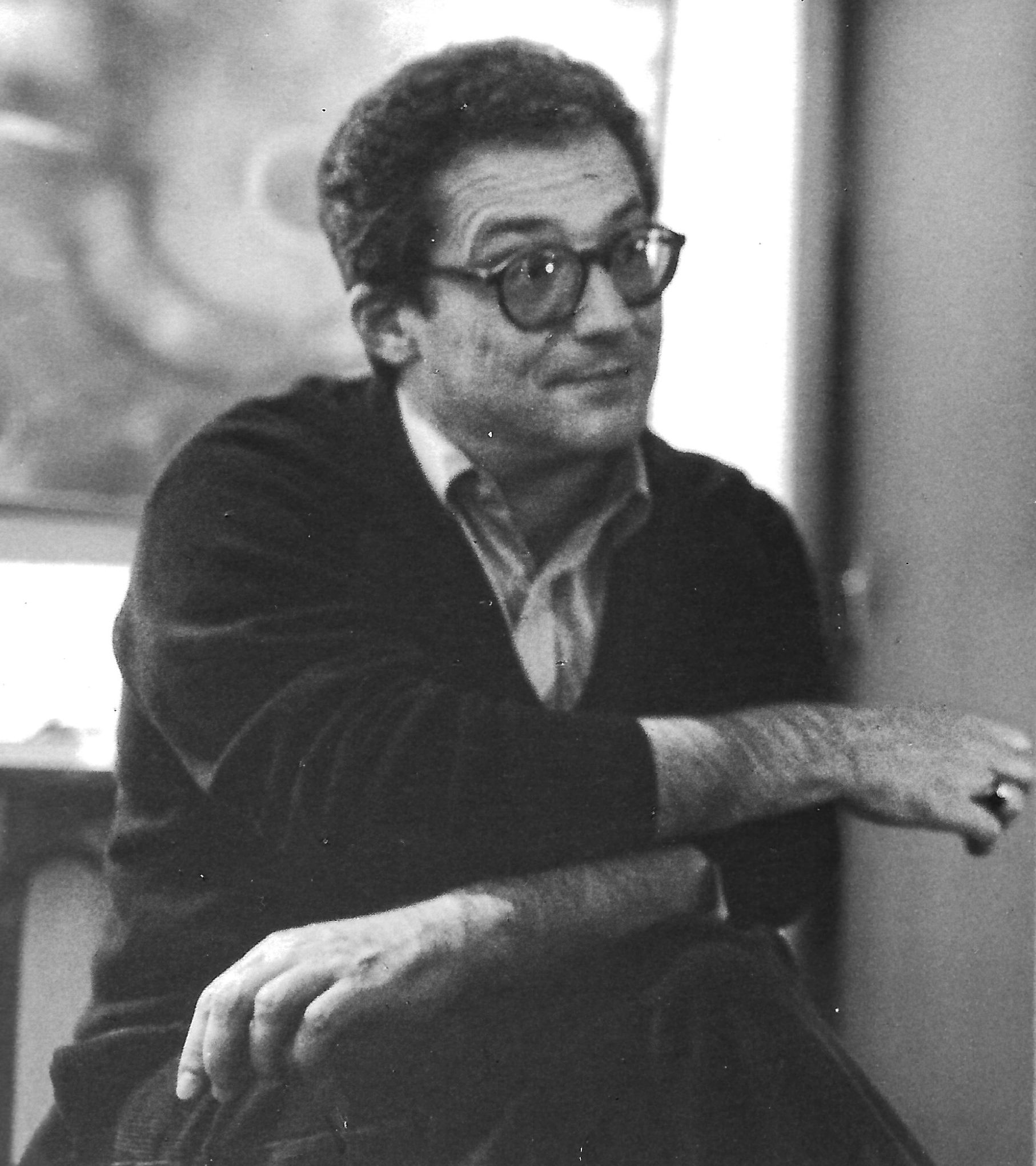
Bernard Dubourg

Bernard Dubourg (20 August 1945 – 20 December 1992) was a French poet, professor of philosophy, translator and Hebrew scholar.

Bernard Dubourg published in Tel Quel and PO&SIE. He wrote several books of poetry, and translated the poetry of J. H. Prynne. He also translated studies of the Samaritans by James Alan Montgomery and Moses Gaster, On the superiority of women by Heinrich Cornelius Agrippa, and published an annotated translation of the Sefer Yetzirah.

His two-volume work on the New Testament argued that the Greek text was originally composed in Hebrew, according to the traditional procedures of midrash. Following Paul Vulliaud, Dubourg emphasised the importance of gematria in showing the coherence of his back-translated text.

== Works ==
- 25 poèmes, 1971
- Parcours, 1971
- (tr. with J. H. Prynne) Poèmes de cuisine by J. H. Prynne. Translated from the English Kitchen Poems. Damazan: B. Dubourg, 1975.
- (tr.) Chansons à la journée-lumière. séquentiel diurne 1 by J. H. Prynne. Translated from the English Daylight Songs. Damazan: B. Dubourg, 1975.
- (tr.) Lézard de feu. séquentiel diurne 2. Translated from the English Fire Lizard. Damazan: B. Dubourg, 1975.
- Sonnets, 1975
- (tr.) motion. Translated from the English The Proposal by Peter Baker, Damazan: B.Dubourg, 1976.
- D'autres poemes, Damazan: B. Dubourg, 1976.
- Poèmes 82-83, 1983
- Les Samaritains (leur histoire, leurs doctrines, leur littérature) by Moses Gaster. Translated from the English. Paris: O.E.I.L, 1984.
- Les hommes du Garizim : histoire, théologie, littérature des Samaritains : avec une bibliographie samaritaine mise à jour by J. A. Montgomery. Translated from the English The Samaritans. Paris: O.E.I.L., 1985.
- (tr.) De la supériorité des femmes by Heinrich Cornelius Agrippa. Paris: Dervy-Livres, 1986. Translation from the Latin Declamatio de nobilitate et praecellentia foeminei sexus
- (tr. with J. H. Prynne) Massepain by J. H. Prynne. Translation from the English Marzipan. Cambridge: P. Riley, 1986.
- L'Invention de Jésus. Vol. 1, L'Hébreu du Nouveau Testament, 1987; Vol. 2, La Fabrication du Nouveau Testament, 1989. Paris: Gallimard.
