= Tetsutaro Namae =

Japanese diver

Personal information
- Born: 1909; Tokyo, Japan

Sport
- Sport: Diving

Tetsutaro Namae (生江 哲太郎, Namae Tetsutarō, born 1909, date of death unknown) is a Japanese diver who competed in the 1932 Summer Olympics. In 1932 he finished eighth in the 3 metre springboard event.
