= Leon Gemmell =

Australian rules footballer

Personal information
- Full name: Leon Colin Gemmell
- Born: 12 March 1921; Albert Park, Victoria
- Died: 29 December 1992 (aged 71)
- Height: 182 cm (6 ft 0 in)
- Weight: 81 kg (179 lb)

Playing career^{1}
Years	Club	Games (Goals)
1942–43, 1945–46	Fitzroy	18 (5)
- ^{1} Playing statistics correct to the end of 1946.

Leon Colin Gemmell (12 March 1921 – 29 December 1992) was an Australian rules footballer who played with Fitzroy in the Victorian Football League (VFL).
