= Per Brandtmar =

Danish footballer (1918–1992)

Personal information
- Full name: Per Carl William Brandtmar
- Date of birth: 18 July 1918
- Place of birth: Shanghai, China
- Date of death: 18 December 1992 (aged 74)
- Position: Defender

International career
Years	Team	Apps	(Gls)
1941	Denmark	1	(0)

Per Brandtmar (18 July 1918 – 18 December 1992) was a Danish footballer. He played in one match for the Denmark national football team in 1941.
