= D. G. M. Wood-Gush =

British animal geneticist and ethologist

- Born: David Grainger Marcus Wood-Gush; 22 November 1922; Transkei South Africa
- Died: 1 December 1992 (aged 70); London, England
- Scientific career
- Fields: Genetics; Ethology

Professor David Grainger Marcus Wood-Gush FRSE (20 November 1922 – 1 December 1992) was a South African-born animal geneticist and ethologist based for most of his professional life in Edinburgh. He was an expert on animal behaviour and academic author in this field. He was one of the first to study the impacts of factory farming. He advocated the study of animal behaviour to gauge what implied "humane treatment" for different species, and tried to balance these factors against economic viability for the farmer. He looked at the impact of stress upon animals and held that animals should be treated as individuals not as a "commodity". In these studies he concluded that food supply was the essential factor in controlling animal behaviour.

He was one of the first to both see the benefits of and physically introduce the concept of free range farming.

== Life ==
He was born in Transkei in South Africa on 20 November 1922 into a Quaker family of British origin. He was educated at Grahamstown. His university career was interrupted by the Second World War during which he served in North Africa in the South African Air Force as a bomber navigator. He lost his lower left arm in 1944 whilst home on leave, due to a motorcycle accident where he was riding pillion. The driver, his friend and the pilot of his bomber, was killed in the accident. David was plagued by phantom pains in the missing hand for all his life.

After the war he studied Science at Witwatersrand University, graduating BSc in 1948. Increasing despairing at his county’s politics and apartheid policy, he left in 1949, going to the University of Edinburgh (which had a growing reputation in the field of genetics) as a postgraduate where he gained both a doctorate in 1952 (PhD) and a Diploma in Animal Genetics (studying under Prof Conrad Hal Waddington and Dr Alan William Greenwood). He thereafter began work at the Poultry Research Centre. Due to his personal limb loss he did much research to establish if animals might feel similar phantom pains to his own due to actions such as dehorning etc. He was always concerned of potential pain and animal suffering in various procedures. In 1975 he conducted an infamous experiment on a remote Scottish island, re-wilding domesticated chickens to measure how they survived. Unfortunately all were killed by a resident population of escaped mink. In 1976 he repeated the experiment somewhat more successfully using pigs.

In 1978 the Poultry Research Centre decided to relocate to Roslin, Midlothian and began more industry-based research. Given David’s disapproval of this and his lack of driving licence (due to his missing arm) making it very difficult to reach this remote site. He moved to more academic roles in Edinburgh instead. In 1978 he began teaching Applied Animal Behaviour at the University of Edinburgh. He was given an Honorary Professorship by the University of Edinburgh in 1981. In the same year he was elected a Fellow of the Royal Society of Edinburgh. His proposers were Noel Farnie Robertson, Aubrey Manning, John Mitchison, Peter M. B. Walker, Peter McDonald and John E. Dale.

From 1984 to 1987 he was President of the Association for the Study of Animal Behaviour. He was also Chairman of the International Society of Applied Ethology. During this period he famously set up the "Edinburgh Pig Park" investigating the benefits of free range pork.

He died of a heart attack while checking into a hotel for a conference in London on 1 December 1992. His body was cremated and his ashes were scattered in the sea near his birthplace of Transkei.

The University created a Wood-Gush Memorial Lecture in his memory.

== Family ==
He married Eola in 1953. They had a daughter Amynta (born 1957) and son Guy (born 1958).

== Selected publications ==
- The Genetic and Population Dynamics of Porcellio Scaber (1953)
- Self-Awareness in Domesticated Animals (1981)
- Elements of Ethology (1983)
- The Behaviour of Domestic Fowl (1971 reprinted 1989)
- Managing the Behaviour of Animals (1990)
