= Malachy Carey =

Irish republican

Personal details
- Born: 1956; Loughgiel, County Antrim
- Died: 12 December 1992 (aged 35–36); Ballymoney, County Antrim
- Political party: Sinn Féin

Malachy Carey (1956 – 12 December 1992) was a volunteer in the Provisional Irish Republican Army and a Sinn Féin candidate in local government elections. He was born in Loughguile, County Antrim in 1956 to an old County Antrim family. He was assassinated by Loyalist paramilitaries in Ballymoney, County Antrim. on 12 December 1992. His death was reported in Republican newspaper An Phoblacht. A Sinn Féin Cumann (local branch of Sinn Féin) has been named in his honour.

He was imprisoned in Crumlin Road (HM Prison) in 1977 at the age of 21 for bombing offences and IRA membership. He took an active part in the Blanket protest until it ended after the 1981 Irish Hunger Strike. He became part of Bobby Sands team in the prison during the period that spanned the two Hunger Strikes. During this period he was known as a 'courier', concealing information notes and other items, including a camera, within his body. His fellow prisoners nicknamed him 'The Suitcase'. He was described by leading member of Sinn Féin, Jim Gibney, as 'solid and dependable... and an important part of Bobby Sands' team'.

Released from prison after 10 years in 1987, he stood in local elections in his native village of Loughgiel. Malachy Carey received many death threats during this period, and was finally assassinated by the loyalist Ulster Freedom Fighters on 12 December 1992. Sinn Féin have claimed there was collusion in his murder by state agencies.
