= Dries van der Lof =

Dutch racing driver (1919–1990)

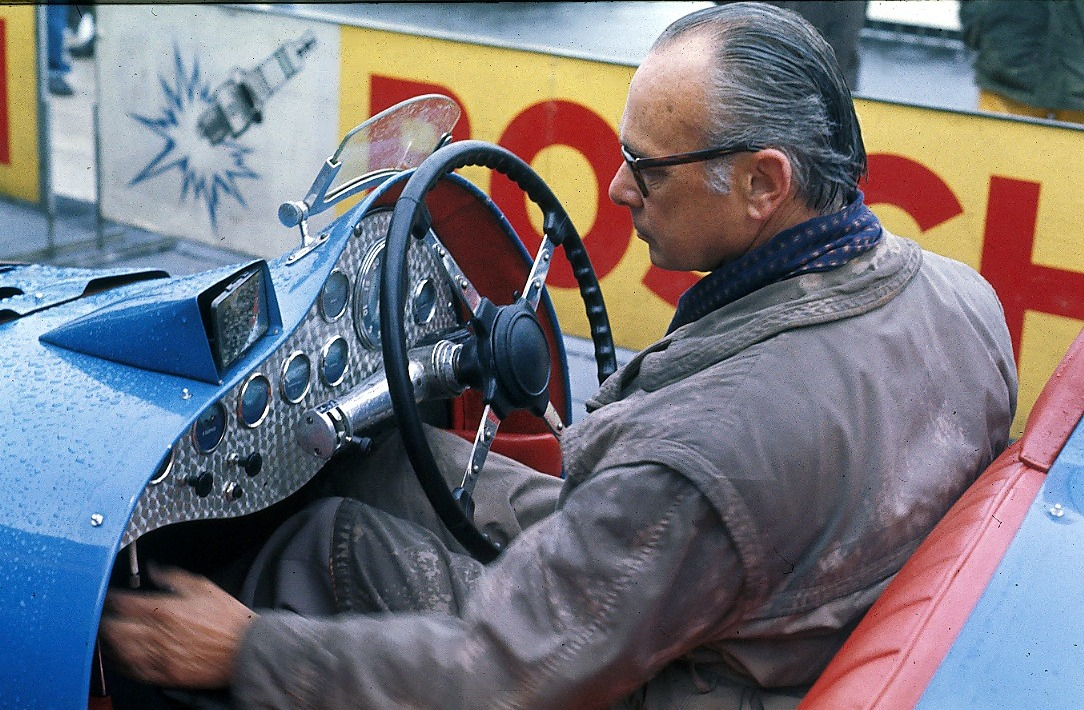
- Dries van der Lof in 1977
- Born: Andre van der Lof; 23 August 1919; Emmen, Netherlands
- Died: 24 May 1990 (aged 70); Enschede, Netherlands

Formula One World Championship career
- Nationality: (Netherlands) Dutch
- Active years: 1952
- Team: HWM
- Entries: 1
- Championships: 0
- Wins: 0
- Podiums: 0
- Career points: 0
- Pole positions: 0
- Fastest laps: 0
- First entry: 1952 Dutch Grand Prix

Andre "Dries" van der Lof (23 August 1919 in Emmen – 24 May 1990 in Enschede) was a racing driver from the Netherlands. Van der Lof was an industrialist whose factory manufactured electric cable, and competed as an amateur in motorsport events. He participated in one World Championship Grand Prix, the 1952 Dutch Grand Prix on 17 August 1952, where together with Jan Flinterman he was the first driver from the Netherlands to compete in a World Championship Grand Prix race. Entering an HWM 52, he retired from the race after 70 laps and scored no championship points. He later bought a Maserati 250F and competed in historic racing until the 1980s.

== Complete World Championship Grand Prix results ==
(key)

Year	Entrant	Chassis	Engine	1	2	3	4	5	6	7	8	WDC	Points
1952	Hersham and Walton Motors	HWM 52	Alta Straight-4	SUI	500	BEL	FRA	GBR	GER	NED; NC	ITA	NC	0
