= Poola Tirupati Raju =

Indian writer (1904–1992)

Poolla Tirupati Raju
- Born: 3 September 1904; British India
- Died: 8 December 1992 (aged 88)
- Occupations: Writer; Philosopher; Academic
- Known for: Indian philosophy
- Awards: Padma Bhushan

Poolla Tirupati Raju (3 September 1904 – 8 December 1992) was an Indian writer, philosopher, academic and a former professor of Jaswant College, Jodhpur (present day Jai Narain Vyas University). He was the author of several books, both in English and Telugu, on Indian philosophy and literature. His publications include Structural Depths of Indian Thought, Telugu Literature, The Philosophical Traditions of India, Introduction to Comparative Philosophy and Idealistic Thought of India. He was the editor of The Concept of Man: A Study in Comparative Philosophy, written by Sarvepalli Radhakrishnan. The Government of India awarded him the third highest civilian honour of the Padma Bhushan, in 1958, for his contributions to literature and education.

He played an important part in the modern development of comparative philosophy and brought out Indian philosophy to the attention of the American academy.

== Selected bibliography ==
- Poolla Tirupati Raju (1953). Idealistic Thought of India. Harvard University Press. p. 454. OCLC 3615962.
- Poolla Tirupati Raju (1944). Telugu Literature. Internat. Book House. p. 154.
- Poolla Tirupati Raju (1962). Introduction to Comparative Philosophy. University of Nebraska Press. pp. 364. OCLC 372601.
- Poolla Tirupati Raju (1972). The Philosophical Traditions of India. University of Pittsburgh Press. p. 256. ISBN 9780822911050.
- Poolla Tirupati Raju (1985). Structural Depths of Indian Thought. State University of New York Press. pp. 599. ISBN 9780887061394.
- Sarvepalli Radhakrishnan (Author), Poolla Tirupati Raju (Editor) (2011). The Concept of Man: A Study in Comparative Philosophy. Literary Licensing. p. 382. ISBN 9781258007546.

== See also ==
- Sarvepalli Radhakrishnan
- M. Hiriyanna
