= Frank Nash (footballer) =

Australian rules footballer (1907–1992)

Personal information
- Full name: Frank Sydenham Nash
- Born: 17 March 1907; Flemington, Victoria
- Died: 2 December 1992 (aged 85)
- Original team: Flemington Methodists
- Height: 191 cm (6 ft 3 in)
- Weight: 83 kg (183 lb)
- Position: Centre half forward / Follower

Playing career^{1}
Years	Club	Games (Goals)
1926–35	Essendon	80 (28)
- ^{1} Playing statistics correct to the end of 1935.

Frank Sydenham Nash (17 March 1907 – 2 December 1992) was an Australian rules footballer who played with Essendon in the Victorian Football League (VFL).

Nash later served in the Australian Army for six months during World War II.
