= Federico Mariscal =

Mexican diver

Personal information
- Full name: Federico Antonio Mariscal Abascal
- Born: 24 September 1910; Mexico City, Mexico
- Died: 5 January 2002 (aged 91); Cuauhtémoc, Mexico City, Mexico

Sport
- Sport: Diving

Federico Antonio Mariscal Abascal (Note: In this Spanish name, the first or paternal surname is Mariscal and the second or maternal family name is Abascal.) (24 September 1910 – 5 January 2002) was a Mexican diver. He competed at the 1928 Summer Olympics and the 1932 Summer Olympics. His brothers are Olympians Alonso Mariscal, Antonio Mariscal, and Diego Mariscal.
