= Prayoon Chanyavongs =

- Born: 17 November 1915; Siam
- Died: 3 December 1992 (aged 77); Thailand
- Other names: Suklek and Chan
- Occupation: political cartoonist
- Known for: Sooklek (or Suklek)
- Spouse: Boonlorm

Prayoon Chanyavongs (17 November 1915 – 3 December 1992) was a Thai comics artist and cartoonist known as Thailand's King of Cartoons for his satirical comics which attacked corruption and political ills. He was awarded the Ramon Magsaysay Award for Journalism, Literature and Creative Communication Arts in 1971.

== Personal life ==
Kuhn Prayoon was born on 17 November 1915, the youngest of four children. As a three-year-old child, he began helping his parents peddle fruits and plu. When he was four, he was shamed when a teacher dressed him in rags and made him beg. This experience motivated him to get a good education to escape a life of poverty.

The Chanyavongs family's fortunes changed because of their business involving authorized opium dens. Prayoon's father's death in 1923 caused financial problems and Prayoon had to transfer to a school with cheaper matriculation fees. He then attended a public secondary school which offered free tuition for students with perfect attendance record. His schooling was assured even though he contracted malaria thanks to his determination by bringing with him medicine and by requesting for rest hours from his teachers when his fever surged.

It was also during this time that his passion for drawing was developed. To be able to buy foreign comic books, he resorted to skipping lunch.

== Career ==
After finishing secondary school at the age of nineteen, Prayoon worked at a freight office for six months. He had wanted to work as a cartoonist but the job required an artist certificate. His big break came in 1934 when Dao Nakorn (Star of the City) published his work. After three years, he became a headline writer at the Prachamit (Friend of the People) and a year later, became a comic serial writer at the Supab Burut (Gentlemen). It was at this point when Sooklek was born.

Characterized by a feather stuck on a band around his head, Sooklek became the vehicle through which Prayoon voiced his insights on politics and society. The comic figure won the hearts of Thai readers because of his sense of humor and for championing moral uprightness. Sooklek's popularity increased circulation of Supab Burut and in no time, Prayoon was earning a lot.

In 1940, he ran for a seat in the Bangkok Municipal Council and won a three-year term but gave up politics after seeing how slowly things get done.

During World War II, he joined the guerilla forces against the Japanese in Thailand. At this time, he helped a wounded British combat pilot find refuge among the Thai guerillas.

== Death and legacy ==
In 1960, Prayoon won the first prize in International Cartoon for Peace Competition for this work entitled The Last Nuclear Test, showing the world exploding after being hit by a nuclear bomb. This work was created in 1956 as a reaction to the Cold War.

Aside from political cartoons, Prayoon also created serial cartoons based on Thai folk tales for children. These became a hit among people in the provinces.

Prayoon died of lymph gland cancer on December 3, 1992, leaving behind a volume of works which were turned over to the National Library of Thailand. His eyes and body were donated to an eye bank and a medical school respectively. At present, his son Sooklek and daughter Soodrak run the Prayoon Foundation to preserve their father's works. An animation studio has been set up to produce animation series starring the cartoon character Sooklek.

== Awards ==
- World Peace Prize (1960)
- Ramon Magsaysay Award for Journalism, Literature and Creative Communication Arts (1971)
