= María Bruguera Pérez =

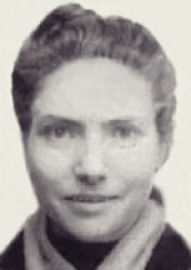
- María Bruguera Pérez, born on 6 November 1915 in Jerez de los Caballeros (Spain) and died in Madrid on 26 December 1992, was a feminist activist and a Spanish anarchist.
- Born: María Bruguera Pérez; 6 November 1913; Jerez de los Caballeros, Spain
- Died: 26 December 1992 (aged 79); Madrid
- Resting place: Cementerio de la Almudena
- Citizenship: Spain
- Era: Spanish Civil War
- Movement: Spanish republicanism anarcho-feminism feminism anarcho-syndicalism
- Mother: Elisa Pérez

María Bruguera Pérez (6 November 1913 – 26 December 1992) was an anarcho-syndicalist who died in Madrid in 1992.

Bruguera came from a family of deep anarchist convictions in a PSOE dominated town in a Confederación Nacional del Trabajo (CNT) area. By the age of nine, she was getting politically involved by joining Juventudes Libertarias. She also became involved with the women's theater group Ni Dios Ni Amo.

Burguera was a 21-year-old at start of the Spanish Civil War in July 1936. Pregnant with what would be her only child, she initially headed towards the Spanish-Portuguese border. With the border being closed, she travelled with family to a plot of land owned by her partner. There, her partner and mother would be killed, her brother and father had a narrow escape, and Burguera and her newborn son were captured.

Burguera avoided the death penalty, and had was given a 30-year prison sentence that was reduced because of her prison labor. She was separated from her son, with authorities changing his name to that of a saint because of changes in law demanding children be named after Catholic saints. After a little over eight years behind bars, Bruguera was released from a Madrid prison in 1946.

CNT militant Aureliano Lobo and Bruguera became a couple shortly after her release. During this same period, Bruguera rejoined CNT, including clandestine meetings. As CNT splintered, Bruguera found herself within a feminist faction, going on to found the Committee of Free Women (Spanish: Comité de Mujeres Libres) with them. From this group, Bruguera would also go on to found the second wave feminist magazine, Mujeres Libertarias.

== Background ==
Bruguera was an anarcho-syndicalist militant woman who served as an indefatigable fighter for her beliefs until her death in Madrid in 1992. Early on, she was involved with Confederación Nacional del Trabajo (CNT), fighting for workers' rights. Later, Bruguera became affiliated with the Confederación General del Trabajo (CGT). She was often affiliated with the anarchist movement.

== Youth ==
Bruguera was born in Jerez de los Caballeros on 6 November 1915 to Antonio Bruguera and Elisa Pérez. Her father''s parents hailed from Palafrugell, Catalonia through he himself was born in Extremadura.

Her family held deep anarchist convictions as a result of her father having had contact with anarchist media while working as an apprentice in Seville in the cork industry. At the time of Bruguera's birth, her home town was predominantly socialist with a corporatist political setup. While her father shared his anarcho-syndicalism thinking among political circles, it took time and the community had to self-teach themselves about the movement's teachings. Confederación Nacional del Trabajo (CNT) had organised the majority of peasants and workers in the Badajoz region by the end of the 1920s. Her father served as the President of Casa del Pueblo de Jerez de los Caballeros. In her youth, there was no CNT and associated union in Jerez for her father to be affiliated with at that time.

As a child, Bruguera worked in a small grocery store run by her mother. This meant she had little time to for formal education in a school. Instead, the grocery store became her school of informal learning. While working at the store, her mother also taught her embroidery. Her obsession with learning as a child led her to spend her last years of school at a local folk high school (Spanish: universidad popular). By the age of nine, she left school when Juventudes Libertarias came to her town. She was joined in promoting Juventudes Libertarias by her brother Antonio and Francisco Torrado. She would become involved with Ni Dios Ni Amo, a women's artistic group she had initially admired. Working with Ni Dios Ni Amo, she brought their programming activities to local comarcas.

== Spanish Civil War ==
The coup d'état that started Spain's Civil War started in July 1936. Burguera was a 21-year-old at the time, and pregnant with Antonio as a result of her relationship with Francisco Torrado. Antonio would be her only child.

Her father and brother quickly joined the Jerez Defense Committee (Spanish: Comité de Defensa de Jerez). Jerez Defense Committee's immediate goal was similar to similar organizations in other towns across Spain: arrest right wing sympathizers in the town to prevent similar uprisings in their own towns. The committee in Jerez would arrest 137 members of the right. While there were no deaths initially on the left, eight members of the right died. The details of how they died were not documented. By 18 September 1936 though, Jerez fell and sixty dead were taken from the streets of the town.

Bruguera and her family escaped the massacre by fascists of Jerez's Republican left. Her father escaped to the Republican area near Badajoz. Bruguera and other family members tried to cross the border into Portugal. People from Huelva and Badajoz had all taken to the road to do the same thing. Many found themselves in the Coitadinha refugee camp near Noudar on the Portuguese side of the border. Others found themselves in a camp near Mourão. While not Spain, Portugal was not viewed as entirely safe either as Portugal was viewed as looking after the Nationalists interests.

Given the limited options with the border being closes, Bruguera and her family traveled to a plot of land owned by Francisco Torrado. While there, Bruguera gave birth with assistance from her mother. Guardia Civil members patrolling the countryside discovered her, murdering Torrado and Elisa Pérez, along with others in the group. Her father escaped, eventually joining Republican soldiers on the front. Her brother also escaped, only to be captured soon after.

== Life in prison ==
Bruguera's life was spared, and she was then taken to Jerez where she, for eight days alongside her son, she was hospitalized before being moved to a prison in Badajoz for a period of a year. While her son was allowed to stay with her for the first nine months of her incarceration so she could nurse him, Antonio was eventually separated from her. He was sent to live with Torrado's parents. A new regulation from the Spanish government had come down that all children were to be named after saints. This was a result of Catholicism being brought into government as a nationalist force. The result was Antonio had his name changed to Francisco, a change that along with the forced separation was a great blow to Bruguera.

After a year in the Badajoz prison, Bruguera was tried. She was subsequently given a death sentence in December 1937 that was later commuted to thirty years in prison. Time was taken off her sentence as a result of her work sewing and embroidering. She found herself moving among several prisons, including one at the convento de la Madres Oblatas de Badajoz. While she refused to work for nuns at convent run prisons, she continued utilizing her embroidery skills.

While in prison, Bruguera suffered a third blow when she learned of the death of her father. He was killed on 17 November 1939 in Badajoz. He had been captured shortly before his death while fighting on the front. Bruguera's health also started to deteriorate while in prison.

Subsequently, Bruguera was then moved from prison to prison, with stays in prisons in Salamanca, Valladolid, Saturrarán and Santander. Seeking better pay and more opportunities, she requested a transfer to a prison in Madrid. While in the Madrid prison, she first made contact with women with whom she would later go on to found Mujeres Libres.

== Life in Madrid ==
Bruguera was released from a Madrid prison in 1946, after having spent eight years and one month behind bars. Following her release, she regained custody of her son and was able to reconnect with her brother, Antonio, who, like Bruguera and their father, had been arrested at the same time and event that saw Bruguera's mother and partner killed. He had been released from prison himself, a few months before his sister. The brother and sister then rented a small apartment in Madrid. Bruguera tried to establish a new life for herself, but also keep involved with her previous political activities.

Bruguera soon connected with CNT militant, Aureliano Lobo. The pair would subsequently become involved, and moved into together. The relationship with Lobo gave Bruguera new energy to participate in the left wing struggle in Francoist Spain. She also continued as an activist inside the CNT.

The late 1950s and early 1960s saw severe repression of CNT by Francoist Spain that made activism even more difficult. Bruguera participated in clandestine meetings of CNT. In 1976, Lobo died and Bruguera through herself into organizing the Health Committee of CNT. Around this time, along with María Carrión and Lobo's sisters, Bruguera would become involved with the Committee of Free Women (Spanish: Comité de Mujeres Libres).

During the mid-1980s, Bruguera was also connecting with other like minded anarcho-feminists in Madrid in this period. During this same period, CNT was splintering into different factions. Bruguera aligned herself with one of the factions. This faction, already active with the Committee of Free Women, would be at the forefront of the founding of the magazine Mujeres Libertarias. They published the first edition of their magazine in Madrid in 1986. Bruguera played a critical role behind the scenes, finding resources to support the magazine, assisting in finding distribution channels for the magazine, and providing ideas for content. The magazine represented second wave feminism.

Following the death of Franco on 20 November 1975, Bruguera could be more open with her activism. She also began to be recognised for her efforts for the first time, especially among anarchist and feminist media organisations.

== Death and commemoration ==
Following her death on 26 December 1992 of natural causes, her body was cremated and her ashes laid to rest at La Almudena de Madrid Cemetery. At an emotional ceremony attended by family members and compatriots, her life struggle to assist other women and workers was viewed as being part of her generous to devotion to others.

Mujeres Libertarias No. 14 published in 1993 was dedicated in her honour. It would be one of its final editions, dissolving not long after her death.
