= Jan Flinterman =

Dutch racing driver (1919–1992)

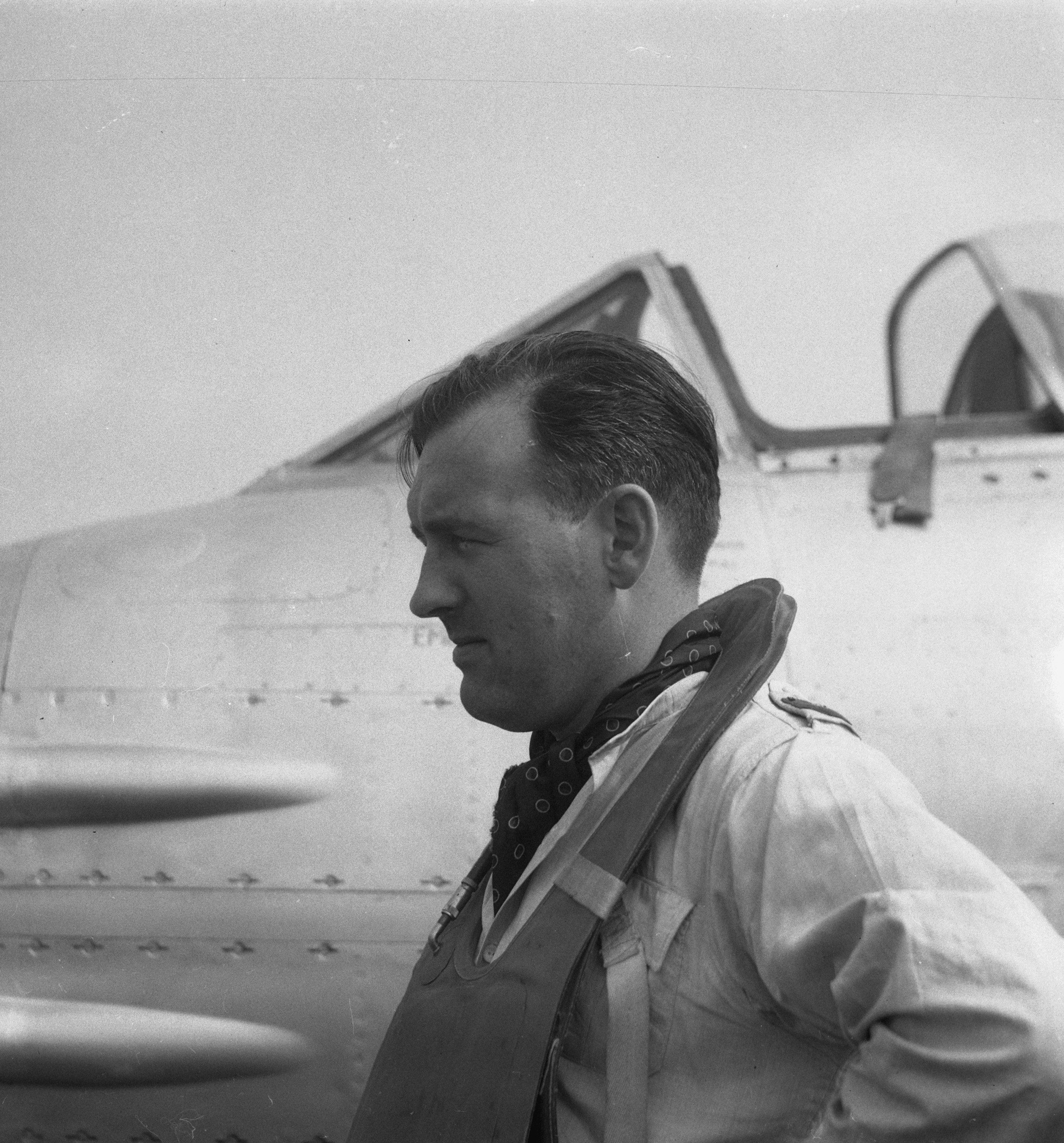
- Flinterman in 1949
- Born: Johannes Leonardus Flinterman; 2 October 1919; The Hague, Netherlands
- Died: 26 December 1992 (aged 73); Leiden, Netherlands

Formula One World Championship career
- Nationality: (Netherlands) Dutch
- Active years: 1952
- Team: non-works Maserati
- Entries: 1
- Championships: 0
- Wins: 0
- Podiums: 0
- Career points: 0
- Pole positions: 0
- Fastest laps: 0
- First entry: 1952 Dutch Grand Prix

Johannes Leonardus "Jan" Flinterman (2 October 1919 – 26 December 1992) was a Dutch Royal Air Force pilot during World War II and a racing driver. Together with Dries van der Lof, he was the first driver from the Netherlands to compete in Formula One.

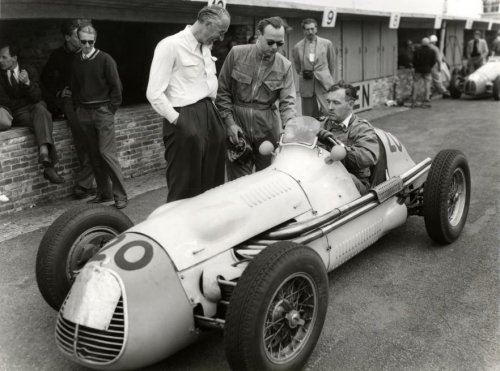
Flinterman in the Maserati he drove at the 1952 Dutch Grand Prix

Flinterman participated in one World Championship Grand Prix, the 1952 Dutch Grand Prix on 17 August 1952. When he had to retire his Maserati with a failure of the rear axle, he was able to take over the similar car of his team mate, Chico Landi. Flinterman finished the race in ninth place, scoring no championship points.

Flinterman died in Leiden in December 1992.

== Complete Formula One World Championship results ==
(key)

Year	Entrant	Chassis	Engine	1	2	3	4	5	6	7	8	WDC	Points
1952	Escuderia Bandeirantes	Maserati A6GCM	Maserati Straight-6	SUI	500	BEL	FRA	GBR	GER	NED; 9 *	ITA	NC	0

* Indicates shared drive with Chico Landi

== Military decorations ==
- Officer of the Order of Orange-Nassau
- Airman's Cross
- War Commemorative Cross
- Distinguished Flying Cross
- 1939–1945 Star
- France and Germany Star
- Defence Medal
- War Medal 1939–1945
