= Panther tank =

German medium tank of WWII

Panzerkampfwagen V Panther
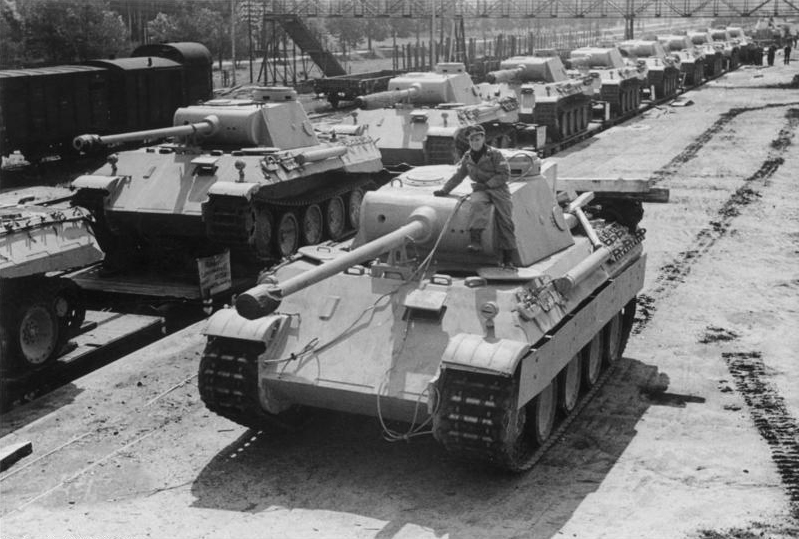
- Panther Ausf. D tanks, 1943
- Type: Medium tank
- Place of origin: Nazi Germany

Service history
- In service: 1943–1945 (Nazi Germany); 1944–1945 (Kingdom of Hungary); 1944–1952 (France)
- Used by: Nazi Germany; France; Hungary; Limited use by other militaries (see Postwar and foreign use)
- Wars: World War II

Production history
- Designer: MAN AG
- Designed: 1942
- Manufacturer: MAN, Daimler-Benz, MNH
- Unit cost: 117,100 ℛ︁ℳ︁ (without weapons, optics, or radio); 143,912 ℛ︁ℳ︁ (combat ready); 2,000 Man hours
- Produced: 1943–1945 (1946–49 postwar for the British Army)
- No. built: ~6,000
- Variants: Befehlspanzer (command tank), Bergepanther (armoured recovery vehicle), Jagdpanther

Specifications
- Mass: 44.8 tonnes (44.1 long tons; 49.4 short tons)
- Length: 6.87 m (22 ft 6 in); 8.66 m (28 ft 5 in) (with gun forward)
- Width: 3.27 m (10 ft 9 in); 3.42 m (11 ft 3 in) (with skirts)
- Height: 2.99 m (9 ft 10 in)
- Crew: 5 (driver, radio operator/hull machine gunner, commander, gunner, loader)
- Armour: 16–100 mm (0.63–3.94 in)
- Main armament: 1 × 75 mm KwK 42 L/70 tank gun with 79 rounds
- Secondary armament: 2 × 7.92 mm MG 34 machine guns with 5,100 rounds
- Engine: V12 Maybach HL230 P30 petrol engine 700 PS (690 hp, 515 kW)
- Power/weight: 15.39 PS (11.5 kW/tonne, 13.77 hp/ton)
- Transmission: ZF AK 7-200. (7 forward 1 reverse)
- Suspension: double torsion bar, interleaved road wheels
- Fuel capacity: 730 litres (160 imp gal; 190 US gal)
- Operational range: Road: 260 km (160 mi); Cross-country: 100 km (62 mi)
- Maximum speed: 55 km/h (34 mph) (early models); 46 km/h (29 mph) (later models)

The Panther tank, officially Panzerkampfwagen V Panther (abbreviated Pz.Kpfw. V) with ordnance inventory designation: Sd.Kfz. 171, is a German medium tank of World War II. It was used in most European theatres of World War II from mid-1943 to the end of the war in May 1945.

The Panther was intended to counter the Soviet T-34 medium tank and to replace the Panzer III and Panzer IV. Nevertheless, it served alongside the Panzer IV and the heavier Tiger I until the end of the war. While having essentially the same Maybach V12 petrol (690 hp) engine as the Tiger I, the Panther had better gun penetration, was lighter and faster, and could traverse rough terrain better than the Tiger I. The trade-off was weaker side armour, which made it vulnerable to flanking fire, and a weaker high explosive shell. The Panther proved to be effective in open country and long-range engagements. The Panther had excellent firepower, protection and mobility, though early variants suffered from reliability issues. The Panther was far cheaper to produce than the Tiger I. Key elements of the Panther design, such as its armour, transmission, and final drive, were simplifications made to improve production rates and address raw material shortages.

The Panther was rushed into combat at the Battle of Kursk in the summer of 1943 despite numerous unresolved technical problems, leading to high losses due to mechanical failures. Most design flaws were rectified by late 1943 and early 1944, though the Allied bombing of production plants in Germany, increasing shortages of high-quality alloys for critical components, shortage of fuel and training space, and the declining quality of crews all impacted the tank's effectiveness. Though officially classified as a medium tank, at 44.8 metric tons the Panther was closer in weight to contemporary foreign heavy tanks. The Panther's weight caused logistical problems, such as an inability to cross certain bridges; otherwise, the tank had a very high power-to-weight ratio which made it highly mobile.

The naming of Panther production variants did not follow alphabetical order, unlike most German tanks – the initial variant, Panther "D" (Ausf. D), was followed by "A" and "G" variants.

== Development and production ==
=== Design ===
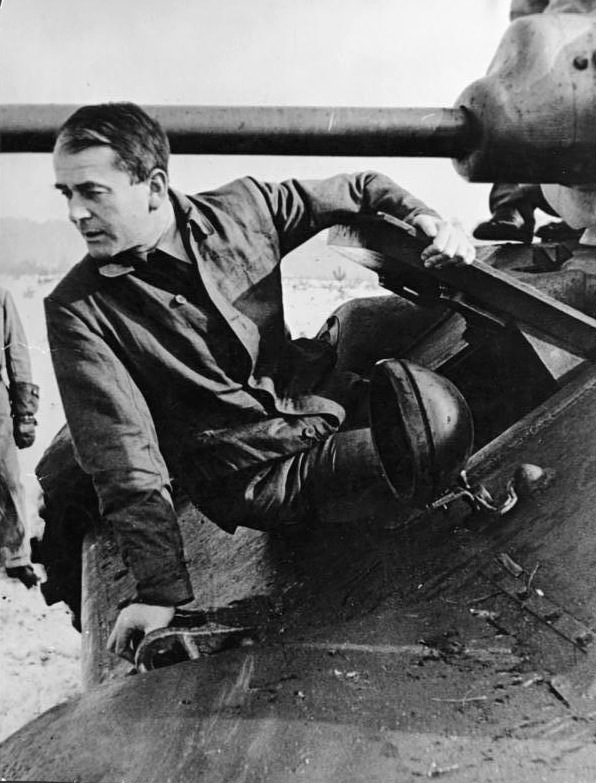
Albert Speer examines a T-34 tank in June 1943

The Panther was born out of a project started in 1938 to replace the Panzer III and Panzer IV tanks. The initial requirements of the VK 20 series called for a fully tracked vehicle weighing 20 tonnes and design proposals by Krupp, Daimler-Benz and MAN ensued. These designs were abandoned and Krupp dropped out of the competition entirely as the requirements increased to a vehicle weighing 30 tonnes, a direct reaction to the encounters with the Soviet T-34 and KV-1 tanks and against the advice of Wa Prüf 6. (Note: Wa Prüf 6 was the tank and motorised equipment department of the German arms procurement agency, the Waffenamt.) The T-34 outclassed the existing models of the Panzer III and IV in certain metrics, such as effective armour thickness and gun caliber. At the insistence of General Heinz Guderian, a special tank commission was created to assess the T-34. Among the features of the Soviet tank considered most significant was the sloped armour, which gave much improved effective armour thickness, the wide track, which improved mobility over soft terrain, and the 76.2 mm (3 in) gun, which had good armour penetration and fired an effective high-explosive round. Daimler-Benz (DB), which designed the successful Panzer III and StuG III, and Maschinenfabrik Augsburg-Nürnberg AG (MAN) were given the task of designing a new 30- to 35-tonne tank, designated VK 30.02, by April 1942.

The VK 30.02(DB) design resembled the T-34 in its hull and turret and was also to be powered by a diesel engine. It was driven from the rear drive sprocket with the turret situated forward. The incorporation of a diesel engine promised increased operational range, reduced flammability and allowed for better use of petroleum reserves. Adolf Hitler considered a diesel engine imperative for the new tank. DB's proposal used an external leaf spring suspension, in contrast to the MAN's proposal of twin torsion bars. Wa Prüf 6's opinion was that the leaf spring suspension was a disadvantage and that using torsion bars would allow greater internal hull width. It also opposed the rear drive because of the potential for track fouling. Daimler-Benz still preferred the leaf springs over a torsion bar suspension as it resulted in a silhouette about 200 mm (7.9 in) shorter and rendered complex shock absorbers unnecessary. The employment of a rear drive provided additional crew space and also allowed for a better slope on the front hull, which was considered important in preventing penetration by armour-piercing shells.

The MAN design embodied a more conventional configuration, with the transmission and drive sprocket in the front and a centrally mounted turret. It had a petrol engine and eight torsion bar suspension axles per side. Because of the torsion bar suspension and the drive shaft running under the turret basket, the MAN Panther was higher and had a wider hull than the DB design. The Henschel company's design concepts for their Tiger I tank's suspension/drive components, using its characteristic Schachtellaufwerk format – large, overlapping, interleaved road wheels with a "slack-track" using no return rollers for the upper run of track, also features shared with almost all German military half-track designs since the late 1930s – were repeated with the MAN design for the Panther. These multiple large, rubber-rimmed steel wheels distributed ground pressure more evenly across the track. The MAN proposal also complemented Rheinmetall's already designed turret modified from that of the VK 45.01 (H), and used a virtually identical Maybach V12 engine to the Tiger I heavy tank's Maybach HL230 powerplant model.

The two designs were reviewed from January to March 1942. Reichsminister Fritz Todt, and later his replacement Albert Speer, both recommended the DB design to Hitler because of its advantages over the initial MAN design. At the final submission, MAN refined its design, having learned from the DB proposal apparently through a leak by a former employee in the Wa Prüf 6, senior engineer Heinrich Ernst Kniepkamp and others. On 5 March 1942, Albert Speer reported that Hitler considered the Daimler-Benz design to be superior to MAN's design. A review by a special commission appointed by Hitler in May 1942 selected the MAN design. Hitler approved this decision after reviewing it overnight. One of the principal reasons given for this decision was that the MAN design used an existing turret designed by Rheinmetall-Borsig, while the DB design would have required a brand new turret and engine to be designed and produced, delaying the commencement of production. This time-saving measure compromised the subsequent development of the design.

Albert Speer recounted in his autobiography Inside the Third Reich:

Since the Tiger had originally been designed to weigh fifty tons but as a result of Hitler's demands had gone up to fifty seven tons, we decided to develop a new thirty ton tank whose very name, Panther, was to signify greater agility. Though light in weight, its motor was to be the same as the Tiger's, which meant it could develop superior speed. But in the course of a year Hitler once again insisted on clapping so much armour on it, as well as larger guns, that it ultimately reached forty eight tons, the original weight of the Tiger.

On 27 February 1944, it was redesignated simply PzKpfw Panther, as Hitler ordered that the Roman numeral "V" be deleted from its designation. In contemporary English-language literature it is sometimes referred to as the "Mark V".

=== Production ===
A mild-steel prototype of the MAN design was produced by September 1942 and, after testing at Kummersdorf, was officially accepted. It was put into immediate production. The start of production was delayed, mainly because of a shortage of specialized machine tools needed for the machining of the hull. Finished tanks were produced in December and suffered from reliability problems as a result. The demand for this tank was so high that the manufacturing was soon expanded beyond MAN to include Daimler-Benz (Berlin-Marienfelde, former DMG plant), Maschinenfabrik Niedersachsen Hanover (MNH, a subsidiary of Eisenwerk Wülfel) and the Tiger I's original designer, Henschel & Sohn in Kassel.

The initial production target was 250 tanks per month at the MAN plant at Nuremberg. This was increased to 600 per month in January 1943. Despite determined efforts, this figure was never reached due to disruption by Allied bombing, and manufacturing and resource bottlenecks. Production in 1943 averaged 148 per month. In 1944, it averaged 315 a month (3,777 having been built that year), peaking with 380 in July and ending around the end of March 1945, with at least 6,000 built in total. Frontline combat strength peaked on 1 September 1944 at 2,304 tanks, but that same month a record number of 692 tanks were reported lost.

The process of streamlining the production of German armoured fighting vehicles first began after Speer became a Reichsminister in early 1942, and steadily accelerated through to 1944; the production of the Panther tank coincided with this period of increased manufacturing efficiency. At the beginning of the war, German armoured fighting vehicle manufacturers had employed labour-intensive and costly manufacturing methods unsuitable for the needs of mass production; even with streamlined production methods introduced later, Germany never approached the efficiency of Allied manufacturing during World War II.

The Allies directed their bombing at the common bottleneck for both Panther and Tiger production: the Maybach engine plant. This was bombed the night of 27/28 April 1944 and production halted for five months. A second factory had already been planned, the Auto Union Siegmar plant (the former Wanderer car factory), and this came on line in May 1944. The targeting of Panther factories began with a bombing raid on the DB plant on 6 August 1944, and again on the night of 23/24 August. MAN was struck on 10 September, 3 October and 19 October 1944, and then again on 3 January and 20/21 February 1945. MNH was not attacked until 14 and 28 March 1945.

In addition to interfering with tank production goals, the bombing forced a steep drop in the production of spare parts (as a percentage of tank production, it dropped from 25–30% in 1943 to 8% in late 1944). This compounded the problems with numbers of operational Panthers and their reliability, as the tanks in the field had to be cannibalised for parts.

=== Production figures ===
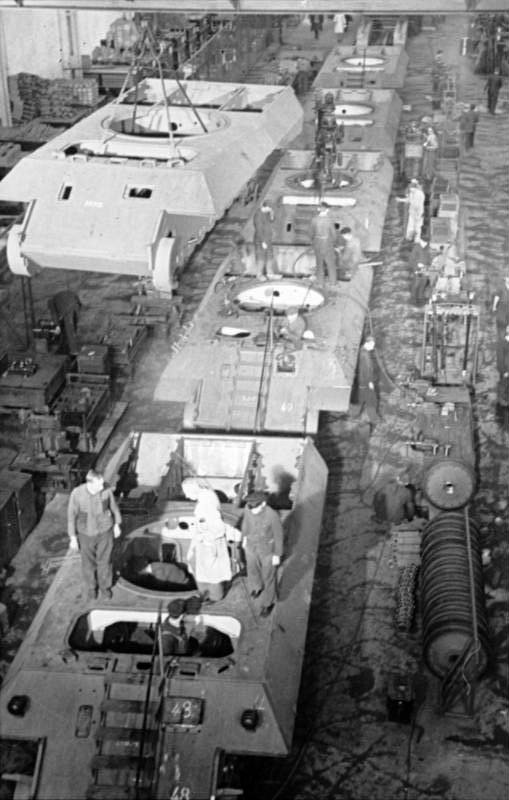
Panther tank production line

The Panther was the third most produced German armoured fighting vehicle, after the Sturmgeschütz III assault gun/tank destroyer at 9,408 units, and the Panzer IV tank at 8,298 units.

Production by type
Model	Number	Date	Notes
Prototype	2	Sep 1942	Designated V1 and V2
Ausf. D	842	Jan 1943 to Sept 1943	
Ausf. A	2,200	Aug 1943 to Aug 1944	
Ausf. G	~2,961	Mar 1944 to Apr 1945	
Befehlspanzer Panther	329	May 1943 to Apr 1945	Converted on the production line
Beobachtungspanzer Panther	1	1944	
Bergepanther	339	1943 to 1945	61 more converted from rebuilt hulls

Panther production in 1944 by manufacturer
Manufacturer	% of total
Maschinenfabrik Augsburg-Nürnberg (MAN)	35
Daimler-Benz	31
Maschinenfabrik Niedersachsen Hannover (MNH)	31
Other	3

=== Cost ===
A Panther tank cost 117,100 Reichsmark (RM) to produce. This compared with 82,500 RM for the StuG III, 96,163 RM for the Panzer III, 103,462 RM for the Panzer IV, and 250,800 RM for the Tiger I. These figures did not include the cost of the armaments and radio. Using forced labour on the production lines greatly reduced costs, but also greatly increased the risk of sabotage (postwar French Army studies in 1947 found that many Panthers had been sabotaged during production). The Germans increasingly strove for production methods that would allow higher production rates and lower cost. By comparison the total cost of the early production Tiger I in 1942–1943 was stated to be as high as 800,000 RM.

According to rough estimates, the labour hours required to produce one Panther were 25% higher than for the Panzer III (i.e. four Panthers for every five Panzer III tanks built).

== Design ==
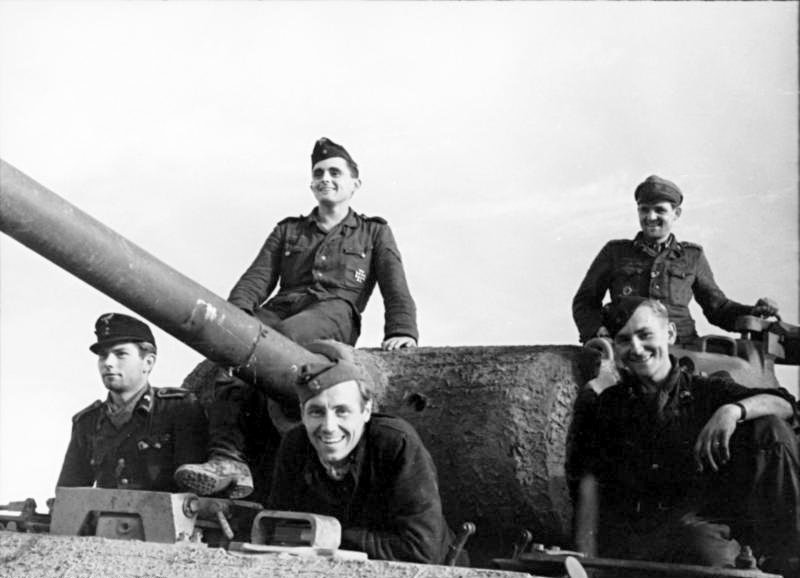
The crew of a Panther on Eastern Front pose for photograph

The weight of the production model was increased to 45 tonnes from the original plans for a 35-tonne tank. Hitler was briefed thoroughly on the comparison between the MAN and DB designs in the report by Guderian's tank commission. Armour protection appeared to be inadequate, while "the motor mounted on the rear appeared to him correct". He agreed that the "decisive factor was the possibility of quickly getting the tank into production". On 15 May 1942, Sebastian Fichtner informed MAN that Hitler had decided in favour of the MAN design for the Panther and ordered series production of the tank. The upper glacis plate was to be increased from 60 mm (2.4 in) to 80 mm (3.1 in). Hitler demanded that an increase to 100 mm (3.9 in) should be attempted and that at least all vertical surfaces were to be 100 mm (3.9 in); the turret front plate was increased from 80 mm (3.1 in) to 100 mm (3.9 in).

The Panther was rushed into combat before all of its teething problems had been corrected. Reliability was considerably improved over time, and the Panther proved to be a very effective fighting vehicle, although some of its design flaws, such as weak final drive, were never fully rectified.

General Hasso von Manteuffel considered the Panther Germany's "most satisfactory" tank, saying it "would have been close to the ideal, had it been possible to design with a lower silhouette."

=== Crew ===
The Panther had five crew members: commander, gunner, loader, driver, and radio operator. The commander, loader and gunner were in the turret, while the driver and radio operator were in the hull of the vehicle. The driver sat on the front-left side of the tank and next to him was the tank's machine gunner, whose tasks also included operating the radio.

=== Engine ===
The first 250 Panthers were powered by a Maybach HL210 P30 V12 petrol engine, which delivered 650 metric hp at 3,000 rpm and had three simple air filters. (Note: Some sources state that only a pre-production run of 20 Panthers used the HL210 engine.) Starting in May 1943, Panthers were built using the 700 metric horsepower (690 hp, 515 kW) at 3,000 rpm, 23.1 litre HL230 P30 V12 petrol engine. To save on aluminium, the light alloy block in the HL210 was replaced with one made of cast iron. Two multistage "cyclone" air filters were used to improve dust removal. The engine's power output was reduced when low-grade petrol was used. With its fuel capacity of 730 litres (160 imperial gallons; 190 US gallons) of petrol, a fully fuelled Panther's range was 260 km (160 mi) on surfaced roads and 100 km (62 mi) cross country.

The HL230 P30 engine was a very compact tunnel crankcase design, and it kept the space between the cylinder walls to a minimum. The crankshaft was composed of seven "discs" or main journals, each with an outer race of roller bearings, and a crankshaft pin between each disc. To reduce the length of the engine by an inch or so, and reduce unbalanced rocking moment caused by a normal offset-Vee type engine, the two banks of 6 cylinders of the V-12 were not offset: the "big ends" of the connecting rods of each cylinder pair in the "V" where they mated with the crankpin were thus at the same spot with respect to the engine block's length rather than offset. This required a "fork and blade" matched pair of connecting rods for each transversely oriented pair of cylinders. Usually, "V"-form engines have their transversely paired cylinders' connecting rods' "big ends" simply placed side by side on the crankpin, with their transverse pairs of cylinders offset slightly to allow the connecting rod big ends to attach side by side while still being in the cylinder bore centreline. This compact arrangement with the connecting rods was the source of considerable problems initially. Blown head gaskets were another problem, which was corrected with improved seals in September 1943. Improved bearings were introduced in November 1943. An engine governor was also added in November 1943 that reduced the maximum engine speed to 2,500 rpm. An eighth crankshaft bearing was added beginning in January 1944 to reduce motor failures.

The engine compartment was designed to be watertight so that the Panther could ford water obstacles; however, this made the engine compartment poorly ventilated and prone to overheating. The fuel connectors in early Panthers were not insulated, leading to the leakage of fuel fumes into the engine compartment, which caused engine fires. Additional ventilation was added to draw off these gases, which only partly solved the problem of engine fires. Other measures taken to reduce this problem included improving the coolant circulation inside the motor and adding a reinforced membrane spring to the fuel pump. Despite the risks of fire, the fighting compartment was relatively safe due to a solid firewall that separated it from the engine compartment.

Engine reliability improved over time. The average service life expectancy without the need to dismount the engine from the tank was about 2000 km, or around 100 working hours. A French assessment in 1947 of their stock of captured Normandy Panther A tanks concluded that the engine had an average life of 1,000 km (620 mi) and maximum life of 1,500 km (930 mi).

=== Suspension ===
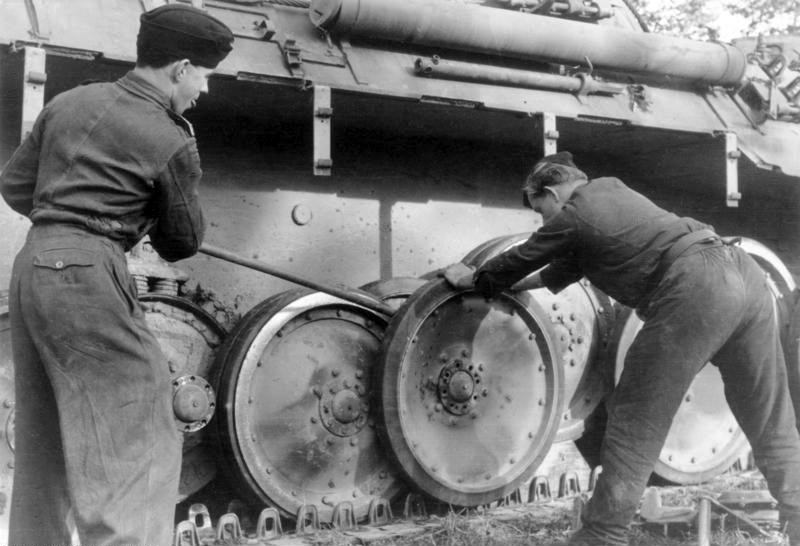
The Schachtellaufwerk interleaved wheels on a Panther made maintenance more difficult.

The suspension consisted of front drive sprockets, rear idlers and eight double-interleaved rubber-rimmed steel road wheels on each side – in the so-called Schachtellaufwerk design on a dual torsion bar suspension. The dual torsion bar system, designed by Professor Ernst Lehr, allowed for a wide travel stroke and rapid oscillations with high reliability, thus allowing for relatively high speed travel over undulating terrain. The extra space required for the bars running across the length of the bottom of the hull, below the turret basket, increased the overall height of the tank. When damaged by mines, the torsion bars often required a welding torch for removal.

The Panther's suspension was over-engineered, and the Schachtellaufwerk interleaved road wheel system made replacing inner road wheels time-consuming (though it could operate with missing or broken wheels). The interleaved wheels also had a tendency to become clogged with mud, rocks and ice, and could freeze solid overnight in the harsh winter weather that followed the autumn rasputitsa (muddy season) on the Eastern Front. During its design phase, the problem of the running gear becoming blocked with mud or snow was reduced to a minimum. Shell damage could cause the road wheels to jam together and become difficult to separate. Interleaved wheels had long been standard on all German half-tracks, with extra wheels providing better flotation and stability and more armour protection for the thin hull sides than systems with smaller or non-interleaved wheels; but its complexity meant that no other country ever adopted this design for their tanks.

In September 1944, and again in March/April 1945, MAN built a limited number of Panthers with overlapping non-interleaved steel-rimmed 80 cm diameter road wheels originally designed for Henschel's Tiger II and late-series Tiger I Ausf. E tanks. These steel-rimmed wheels were introduced from hull number 121052 due to raw material shortages.

From November 1944 through February 1945, a conversion process began to use sleeve bearings in the Panther tank, as there was a shortage of ball bearings. The sleeve bearings were primarily used in the running gear; plans were also made to convert the transmission to sleeve bearings, but were not carried out due to the ending of Panther production.

=== Steering and transmission ===
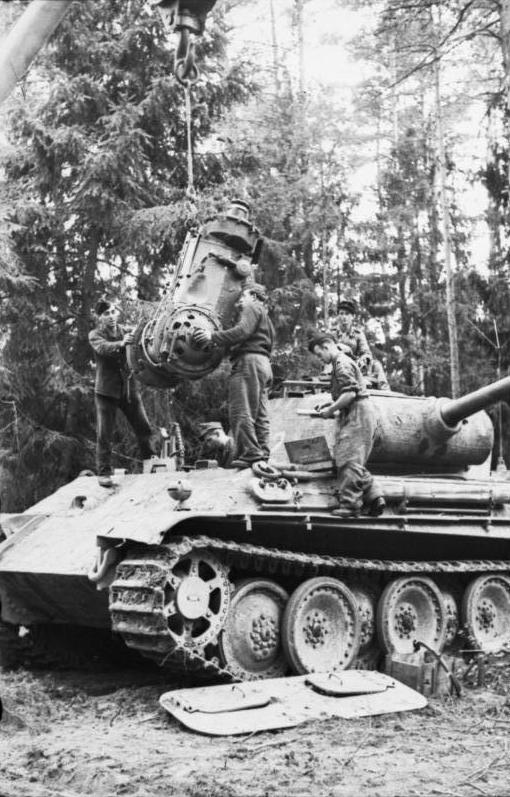
The Panther transmission had to be removed from the hull to effect repairs.

Steering was accomplished through a seven-speed AK 7-200 synchromesh gearbox from Zahnradfabrik Friedrichshafen (ZF), and a MAN single radius steering system, operated by steering levers. Each gear had a fixed radius of turning, ranging from 5 m (16 ft) for 1st gear up to 80 m (260 ft) for 7th gear. The driver was expected to judge the sharpness of a turn ahead of time and shift into the appropriate gear to turn the tank. The driver could also engage the brakes on one side to force a sharper turn. This was a much simplified design compared to the Tiger tanks.

The AK 7-200 transmission was capable of pivot turns but only when the ground resistance on both tracks was the same. This high-torque method of turning could cause failures of the final drive. The overstressed transmission system led to premature stripping of the third gear. This was compounded by alloy shortages which made gears more brittle and prone to failure. To reach the final drive for repair, the entire driver's compartment and transmission had to be disassembled and lifted out.

The Panther's main weakness was its final drive unit. The problems stemmed from several factors. The original MAN proposal had called for the Panther to have an epicyclic gearing (planetary) system in the final drive, similar to that used in the Tiger I. Germany suffered from a shortage of gear-cutting machine tools and for mass-production numerous simplifications were made to the design and its manufacture, sometimes against the wishes of designers and army officers. Consequently, the final drive was changed to a double spur system; although simpler to produce, the double spur gears had higher loads, making them prone to failure.

A report by Dr. Puschel of MAN said "The main cause of these failures was fatigue of the compound intermediate gear due to the low-core strength of the material used and the absence of case hardening at the critical sections" and "the use of split ring dowels with only a few bolts to retain the main drive gear to its flange proved unsatisfactory. This difficulty was subsequently overcome by...fitting bolts."

German industry made a number of modifications to the final drive units on the Panther Ausf. G in September and October 1944 to increase the durability of the unit. Jacques Littlefield, of the Military Vehicle Technology Foundation, which restored a Panther Ausf. A, said "we found that the alloy and gears used in their construction were as good as we could make them today. I suspect the main problem with the final drive was that they were designed for a much lighter version of the Panther...Once they started to up-armor the Panther, there was no room to beef up the final drives to handle the extra weight."

=== Armour ===
Initial production Panthers had a face-hardened glacis plate (the main front hull armour piece), but as armour-piercing capped rounds became the standard in all armies (thus defeating the benefits of face-hardening, which caused uncapped rounds to shatter), this requirement was deleted in March 1943. By August 1943, Panthers were being built only with a homogeneous steel glacis plate. The front hull had 80 mm (3.1 in) of armour angled at 55 degrees from the vertical, welded but also interlocked with the side and bottom plates for strength. The combination of moderately thick and well-sloped armour meant that heavy Allied weapons, such as the Soviet 122 mm A-19, 100 mm BS-3 and US 90 mm M3, were needed to assure penetration of the upper glacis at normal combat ranges.

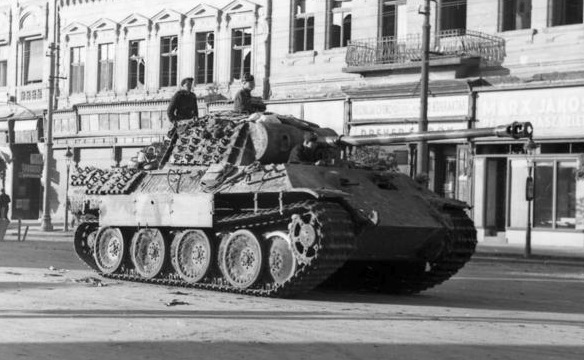
Panther with track segments hung on the turret sides to augment the armour

The armour for the side hull and superstructure (the side sponsons) was much thinner at 40–50 mm (1.6–2.0 in). The thinner side armour was necessary to reduce the weight, but made the Panther vulnerable to hits from the side by all Allied tank and anti-tank guns. German tactical doctrine for the use of the Panther emphasized the importance of flank protection and 5 mm (0.20 in)-thick spaced armour or armoured skirts, known as Schürzen were added. Intended to provide protection for the lower side hull from Soviet anti-tank rifles such as the PTRS-41, the armour was fitted on the hull side. Zimmerit coating against magnetic mines started to be applied at the factory on late Ausf. D models beginning in September 1943; an order for field units to apply Zimmerit to older versions of the Panther was issued in November 1943. In September 1944, orders to stop all application of Zimmerit were issued, based on false rumours that hits on the Zimmerit had caused vehicle fires. Panther crews were aware of the weak side armour and made augmentations by hanging track links or spare roadwheels onto the turret and/or the hull sides.

The rear hull top armour was only 16 mm (0.63 in) thick, and had two radiator fans and four air intake louvres over the engine compartment that were vulnerable to strafing by aircraft.

As the war progressed, Germany was forced to reduce or eliminate critical alloying metals in the production of armour plate, such as nickel, tungsten and molybdenum; this resulted in lower impact resistance levels compared to earlier armour. In 1943, Allied bombers struck and severely damaged the Knaben mine in Norway, eliminating a key source of molybdenum; supplies from Finland and Japan were also cut off. The loss of molybdenum, and its replacement with other substitutes to maintain hardness, as well as a general loss of quality control, resulted in an increased brittleness in German armour plate, which developed a tendency to fracture when struck with a shell. Testing by U.S. Army officers in August 1944 in Isigny, France showed catastrophic cracking of the armour plate on two out of three Panthers examined.

=== Armament ===
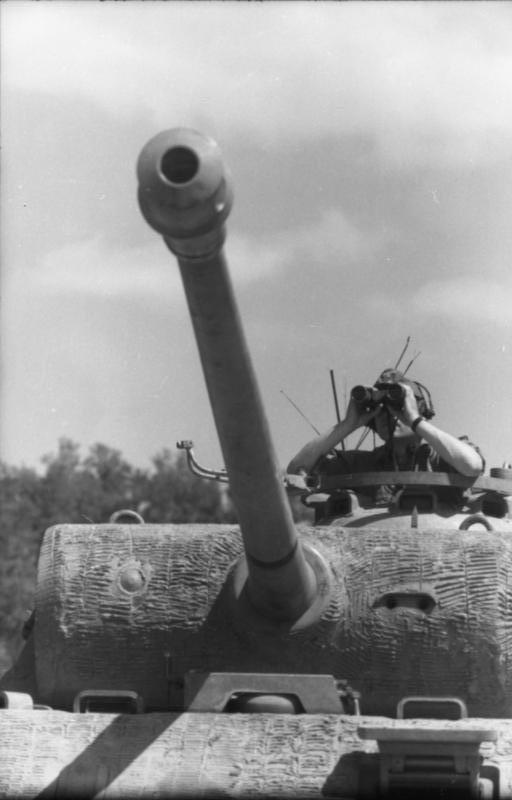
Main armament: 75 mm KwK 42 (L/70)

The main gun was a Rheinmetall-Borsig 7.5 cm KwK 42 (L/70) with semi-automatic shell ejection and a supply of 79 rounds (82 on Ausf. G). The main gun used three different types of ammunition: APCBC-HE (Pzgr. 39/42), HE (Sprgr. 42) and APCR (Pzgr. 40/42), the last of which was usually in short supply. While it was of a calibre common on Allied tanks, the Panther's gun was one of the most powerful of World War II, due to the large propellant charge and the long barrel, which gave it a very high muzzle velocity and excellent armour-piercing qualities — among Allied tank guns of similar calibre, none had equivalent muzzle energy. Only the British Sherman Firefly conversion's Ordnance QF 17-pounder gun — 3 inch (76.2mm) calibre, and a 55 calibre long (L/55) barrel, with its access to APDS shot — had more potential armour perforation power, but APDS was considerably less accurate owing to disturbances caused by the separation of shot and sabot and at a cost of less severe damage inside the target after perforation of the armour. The flat trajectory and accuracy of the full bore ammunition also made hitting targets much easier, since accuracy was less sensitive to errors in range estimation and increased the chance of hitting a moving target. The Panther's 75 mm gun had more penetrating power than the main gun of the Tiger I heavy tank, the 8.8 cm KwK 36 L/56, although the larger 88 mm projectile might inflict more damage if it did penetrate. The 75 mm HE round was inferior to the 88mm HE round used for infantry support, but was on par with most other 75mm HE rounds used by other tanks and assault guns. (Note: The German Explosive Ordnance (Projectiles and Projectile Fuzes) technical manual states that the 8.8 cm KwK 36 HE shell from the Tiger I contained 0.9 kg of amatol (3765 Kilojoules). The 7.5 cm KwK 42 HE shell from the Panther contained 0.650 kg of amatol (2720 Kilojoules). By contrast the 7.5 cm KwK 37 HE round contained 0.454 kg of amatol (1900 Kilojoules) and the 7.5 cm KwK 40 HE round contained 0.66 kg of amatol (2760 Kilojoules).)

The tank typically had two MG 34 armoured-fighting-vehicle-variant machine-guns with an armoured barrel-sleeve. An MG 34 machine-gun was located co-axially with the main gun on the gun mantlet; an identical MG 34 was located on the glacis plate and fired by the radio operator. Initial Ausf. D and early Ausf. A models used a "letterbox" flap enclosing its underlying thin, vertical arrowslit-like aperture, through which the machine gun was fired. In later Ausf. A and all Ausf. G models (starting in late November-early December 1943), a ball mount in the glacis plate with a K.Z.F.2 machine-gun sight was installed for the hull machine-gun.

Initial Ausf. D were equipped with the Nebelwurfgerät smoke grenade launcher with the later Ausf. A and Ausf. G receiving the Nahverteidigungswaffe.

=== Ammunition storage ===
Ammunition storage for the main gun was a weak point. All the ammunition for the main armament was stored in the hull, with a significant amount stored in the sponsons. In the Ausf. D and A models, 18 rounds were stored next to the turret on each side, for a total of 36 rounds. In the Ausf. G, which had deeper sponsons, 24 rounds were stored on each side of the turret, for a total of 48 rounds. In all models, four rounds were also stored in the left sponson between the driver and the turret. An additional 36 rounds were stored inside the hull of the Ausf. D and A models – 27 in the forward hull compartment directly underneath the mantlet. In the Ausf. G, the hull ammunition storage was reduced to 27 rounds total, with 18 rounds in the forward hull compartment. For all models, three rounds were kept under the turntable of the turret. The stowage of 52 rounds of ammunition in the side sponsons made this area the most vulnerable point on the Panther since penetration here usually led to catastrophic ammunition fires. The loader was stationed in the right side of the turret. With the turret facing forward, he had access only to the right sponson and hull ammunition, and so these served as the main ready-ammunition bins.

=== Turret ===
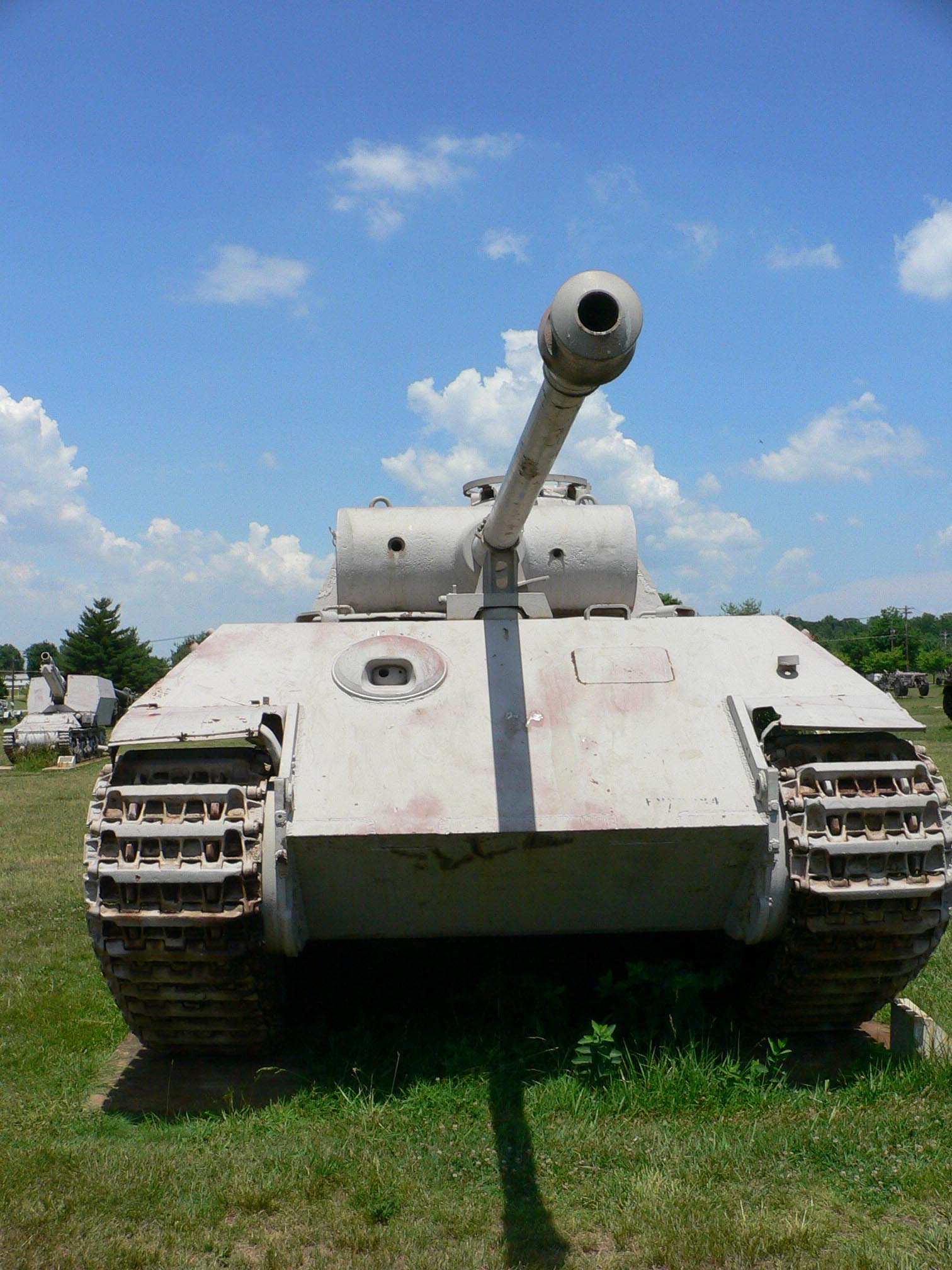
Panther Ausf. A with regular rounded gun mantlet

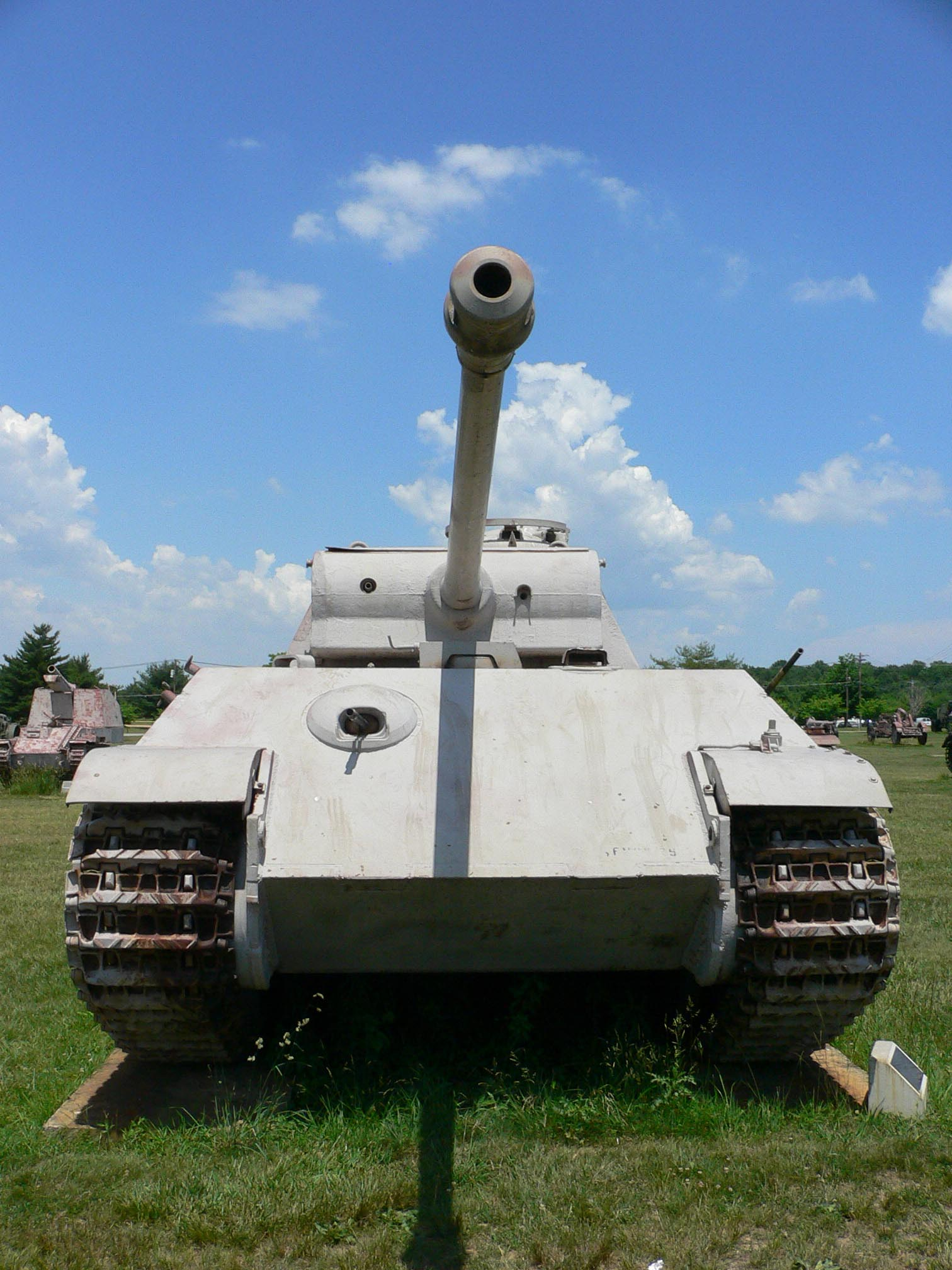
Panther Ausf. G with anti-ricochet 'chin' on its mantlet

The front of the turret was a curved 100 mm (3.9 in) thick cast armour mantlet. Its transverse-cylindrical shape meant that it was more likely to deflect shells, but the lower section created a shot trap. If a non-penetrating hit bounced downwards off its lower section, it could penetrate the thin forward hull roof armour, and plunge down into the front hull compartment. Penetrations of this nature could have catastrophic results, since the compartment housed the driver and radio operator sitting along both sides of the massive gearbox and steering unit. Also, four magazines containing main gun ammunition were located between the driver/radio operator seats and the turret, directly underneath the gun mantlet when the turret was facing forward.

From September 1944, a slightly redesigned mantlet with a flattened and much thicker lower "chin" design started to be fitted to Panther Ausf. G models, the chin being intended to prevent such deflections. Conversion to the "chin" design was gradual, and Panthers continued to be produced to the end of the war with the rounded gun mantlet.

The Ausf. A model introduced a new cast armour commander's cupola, replacing the forged cupola. It featured a steel hoop to which a third MG 34 or either the coaxial or the bow machine gun could be mounted for use in the anti-aircraft role.

Powered turret traverse was provided by the variable speed Boehringer-Sturm L4 hydraulic motor, which was driven from the main engine by a secondary drive shaft, the same system as on the PzKpfw.VI Tiger. On early production versions of the Panther maximum turret traverse was limited to 6º/second, whilst on later versions a selectable high speed traverse gear was added. Thus the turret could be rotated 360 degrees at up to 6º/second in low gear independent of engine rpm (same as on early production versions), or up to 19º/second with the high speed setting and engine at 2000 rpm, and at over 36º/second at the maximum allowable engine speed of 3000 rpm. The direction and speed of traverse was controlled by the gunner through foot pedals, the speed of traverse corresponding to the level of depression the gunner applied to the foot pedal. This system allowed for very precise control of powered traverse, a light touch on the pedal resulting in a minimum traverse speed of 0.1 deg/sec (360 degrees in 60 min), unlike in most other tanks of the time (e.g. US M4 Sherman or Soviet T-34) this allowed for fine laying of the gun without the gunner needing to use his traverse handwheel.

== Combat use ==
Panthers were supplied to form Panzer Abteilung 51 (Tank Battalion 51) on 9 January, and then Panzer Abteilung 52 on 6 February 1943.

=== Eastern Front ===
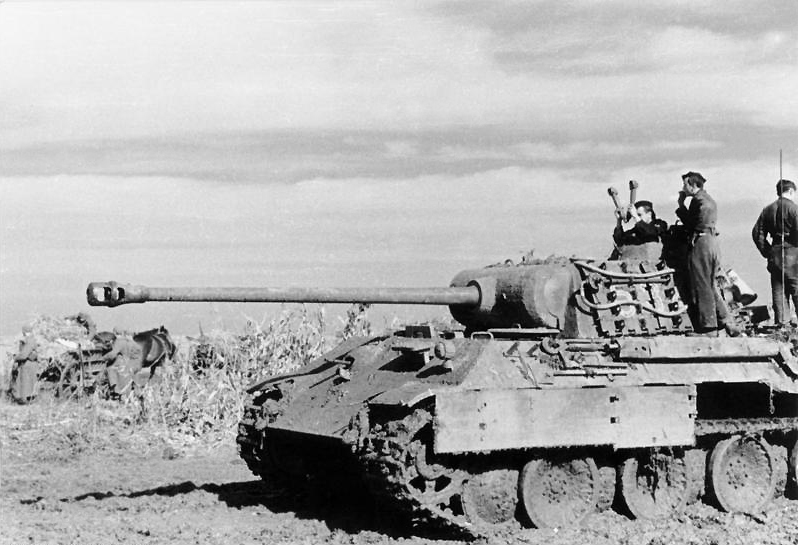
Panther on the Eastern Front, 1944

The Panther tank was seen as a necessary component of Operation Citadel, and the attack was delayed several times because of their mechanical problems and to receive more Panthers, with the eventual start date of the battle only six days after the last Panthers had been delivered to the front. This resulted in major problems in Panther units during the Battle of Kursk, as tactical training at the unit level, coordination by radio, and driver training were all seriously deficient.

It was not until 23–29 June 1943 that a total of 200 rebuilt Panthers were finally issued to Panther Regiment von Lauchert, of the XLVIII Panzer Corps (4 Panzer Army). Two were immediately lost due to motor fires on disembarking from the trains. By 5 July, when the Battle of Kursk started, there were only 184 operational Panthers. Within two days, this had dropped to 40. A report on 20 July 1943 showed 41 Panthers as operational, 85 as repairable, 16 severely damaged and needing repair in Germany, 56 burnt out because of enemy action, and two destroyed by motor fires.

The Panther demonstrated its capacity to destroy any Soviet armoured fighting vehicle from long distance during the Battle of Kursk, and had a very high overall kill ratio. It constituted less than seven percent of the estimated 2,400–2,700 total armoured fighting vehicles deployed by the Germans in this battle, but claimed 267 destroyed tanks. Despite this, its greatest historical role in the battle may have been a highly negative one—its contribution to the decisions to delay the original start of Operation Citadel for a total of two months, time which the Soviets used to build up an enormous concentration of minefields, anti-tank guns, trenches and artillery defences.

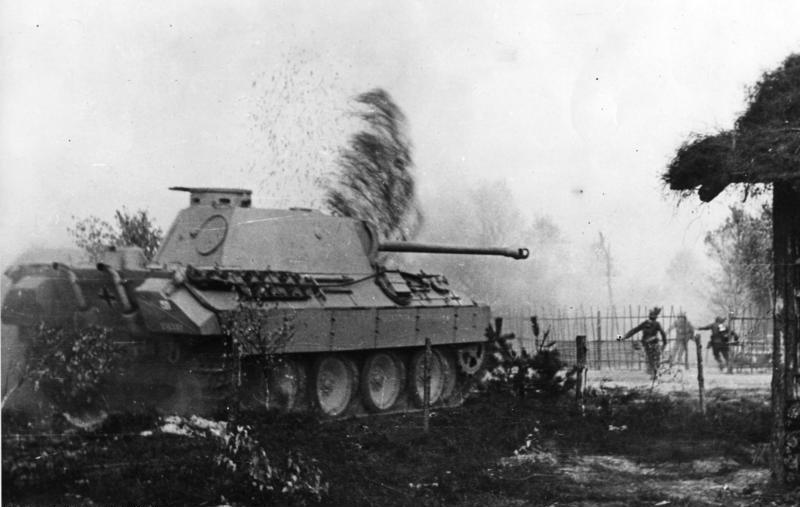
An early Panther Ausf. D supporting infantry on the Eastern Front

After the losses of the Battle of Kursk, the German Army went into a permanent state of retreat from the Red Army. The numbers of Panthers were slowly built up again on the Eastern Front, and the operational percentage increased as reliability improved. In March 1944 Guderian reported: "Almost all the bugs have been worked out", although many units continued to report significant mechanical problems, especially with the final drive. The greatly outnumbered Panthers came to be used as mobile reserves to fight off major attacks.

The highest total number of operational Panthers on the Eastern Front was achieved in September 1944, when some 522 were listed as operational out of a total of 728. Throughout the rest of the war Germany continued to keep the great majority of Panther forces on the Eastern Front, where the situation progressively worsened for them. The last recorded status, on 15 March 1945, listed 740 on the Eastern Front, of which 361 were operational. By this time the Red Army had entered East Prussia and was advancing through Poland.

In August 1944 Panthers were deployed during the Warsaw Uprising as mobile artillery and troop support. At least two of them were captured in the early days of the conflict and used in actions against the Germans, including the liberation of the Gęsiówka concentration camp on 5 August, when the soldiers of "Wacek" platoon used the captured Panther (named "Magda") to destroy the bunkers and watchtowers of the camp. Most of the Germans in the camp were killed; the insurgents had lost two people and liberated almost 350 people. After several days the captured tanks were immobilized due to the lack of fuel and batteries and were set ablaze to prevent them from being recaptured.

In February 1945 during the Lower Silesian offensive operation, one captured ex-German "Panther" tank with an experienced crew from 4th Tank Corps under the command of the Hero of the Soviet Union Lt. Nikolai Ivanovich Ageev was used in a reconnaissance mission. At dusk, the tank passed through the forest, attacked from the flank and destroyed three enemy "Panther" tanks, but then, during the retreat to Soviet positions, it was hit by German artillery and damaged. After the battle the tank was written off due to lack of spare parts and maintenance problems.

=== Western Front – France ===
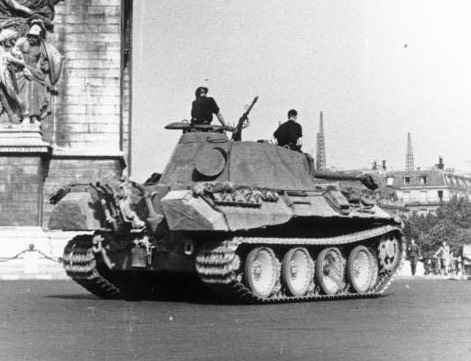
A Panther Ausf. A tank of 12th SS Panzer division in Paris shortly before the Allied invasion, June 1944

At the time of the invasion of Normandy in June 1944, there were initially only two Panther-equipped Panzer regiments in the Western Front, with a total of 156 Panthers between them. From June through August 1944, an additional seven Panther regiments were sent into France, reaching a maximum strength of 432 in a status report dated 30 July 1944.

The majority of the German tank forces in Normandy — six and a half divisions — were drawn into fighting the Anglo-Canadian forces of the 21st Army Group around the town of Caen. The numerous operations undertaken to secure the town became collectively known as the Battle of Caen. While there were areas of heavy wooded bocage around Caen, most of the terrain was open fields which allowed the Panther to engage the attacking enemy armour at long range — its combination of superior armour and firepower allowed it to engage at distances from which the Shermans could not respond. Conversely, by the time of the Normandy Campaign, British divisional anti-tank regiments were well equipped with the excellent 17-pounder gun, and some U.S.-supplied M10 tank destroyers had their 3-inch gun replaced with the 17pdr (giving the 17pdr SP Achilles), making it equally perilous for Panthers to attack across these same fields. The British had begun converting regular M4 Shermans to carry the 17-pounder gun (nicknamed Firefly) prior to the D-Day landings. While limited numbers meant that during Normandy usually not more than one Sherman in each troop of four tanks was a Firefly variant, the lethality of the gun against German armour made them priority targets for German gunners.

In the meantime, U.S. forces, facing one and a half German panzer divisions, mainly the Panzer Lehr Division, struggled in the heavy, low-lying bocage terrain west of Caen. Like the Sherman, the Panther struggled in the bocage country of Normandy, and was vulnerable to side and close-in attacks in the built-up areas of cities and small towns. The commander of the Panzer Lehr Division, Gen. Fritz Bayerlein, reported on the difficulties experienced by the Panther tank in the fighting in Normandy:

While the PzKpfw IV could still be used to advantage, the PzKpfw V [Panther] proved ill adapted to the terrain. The Sherman because of its maneuverability and height was good ... [the Panther was] poorly suited for hedgerow terrain because of its width. Long gun barrel and width of tank reduce maneuverability in village and forest fighting. It is very front-heavy and therefore quickly wears out the front final drives, made of low-grade steel. High silhouette. Very sensitive power-train requiring well-trained drivers. Weak side armor; tank top vulnerable to fighter-bombers. Fuel lines of porous material that allow gasoline fumes to escape into the tank interior causing a grave fire hazard. Absence of vision slits makes defense against close attack impossible.

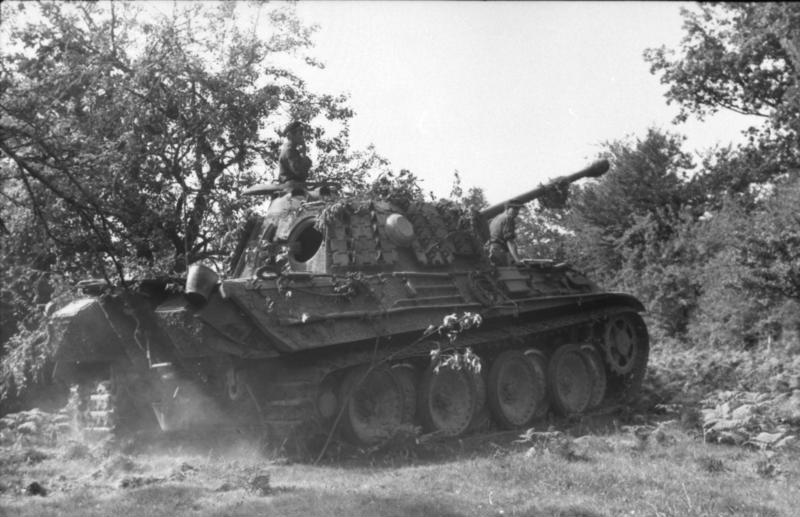
Panther Ausf. G in Bocage, mid-1944, France

Bayerlein still appreciated the Panther's virtues used in the right conditions, writing: "An ideal vehicle for tank battles and infantry support. The best tank in existence for its weight".

Through September and October, a series of new Panzerbrigades equipped with Panther tanks were sent into France to try to stop the Allied advance with counter-attacks. This culminated in a number of tank battles; firstly at Dompaire (12-14 September 1944) against the French 2nd Armoured Division where the newly formed 112 Panzer Brigade was decimated, which included the loss of 34 Panthers, and few losses for the French in return. Soon after that, the Battle of Arracourt (18–29 September) took place, and again mostly Panther-equipped German forces suffered heavy losses fighting against the 4th Armored Division of Patton's Third Army, which were still primarily equipped with 75 mm M4 Sherman tanks and yet again, came away from the battle with few losses. The Panther units were newly formed, poorly trained and tactically disorganized; most units ended up stumbling into ambushes against seasoned U.S. tank crews.

=== Western Front – Ardennes offensive ===
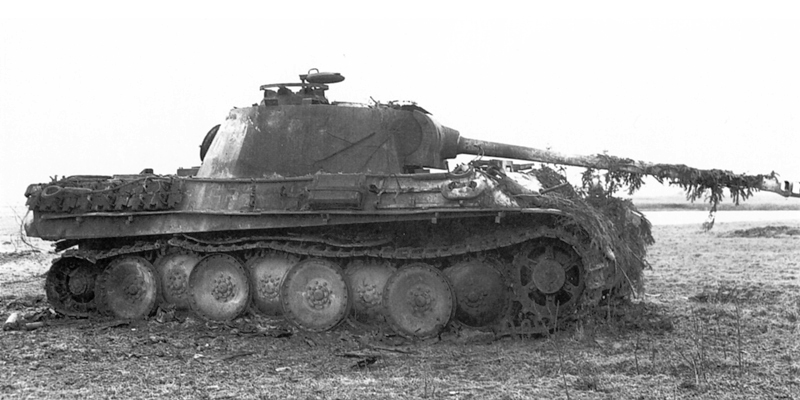
Burnt out Panther Ausf. G at the Battle of the Bulge, penetrated in the sponson

A status report on 15 December 1944 listed an all-time high of 471 Panthers assigned to the Western Front, with 336 operational (71 percent). This was one day before the start of the Battle of the Bulge; 400 of the tanks assigned to the Western Front were in units sent into the offensive.

The Panther once again demonstrated its prowess in open country, where it could hit its targets at long range with near-impunity, and its vulnerability in the close-in fighting of the small towns of the Ardennes, where they suffered heavy losses. A status report on 15 January 1945 showed only 97 operational Panthers left in the units involved in the operation, out of 282 still in their possession. Total writeoffs were listed as 198.

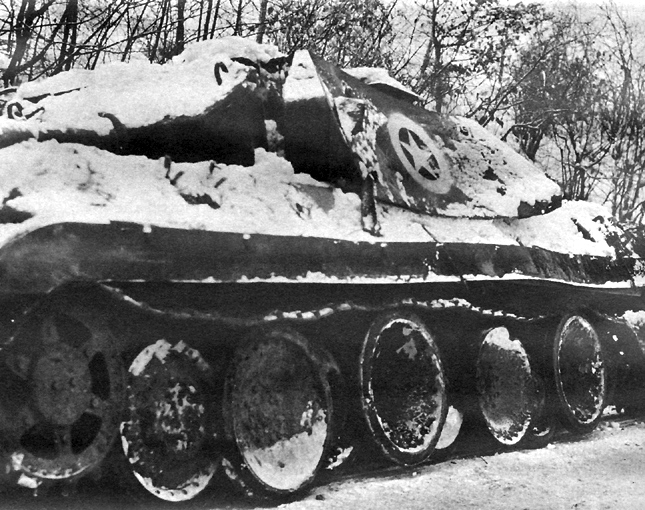
Panther disguised as an M10 tank destroyer

The Operation Greif commando mission included five Panthers assigned to Panzerbrigade 150, disguised to look like M10 tank destroyers by welding on additional plates, applying U.S.-style camouflage paint and markings. This was carried out as part of a larger operation that involved soldiers disguised as Americans to attack U.S. troops from the rear. The disguised Panthers were detected and destroyed.

In February 1945, eight Panzer divisions with a total of 271 Panthers were transferred from the West to the Eastern Front. Only five Panther battalions remained in the west.

One of the top German Panther commanders was SS-Oberscharführer Ernst Barkmann of the 2nd SS-Panzer Regiment "Das Reich". By the end of the war, he had some 80 tank kills claimed. though some of his claimed performfance has been attributed to the "propaganda efforts of the Waffen-SS".

Historian Steven Zaloga observed that the Panther's performance in the Ardennes operation against American M4 Shermans was disappointing for a vehicle of its technical specifications, given the Panther's superior armour and armament to the Sherman. Zaloga argues that this was down to the fact that at this point in the war, the quality of German tank crews had fallen and most Panther crews were inexperienced with minimal training. The lack of training exacerbated the Panther's technical weaknesses (poor power train durability and a lack of fuel and spare parts), resulting in many Panthers breaking down which were unable to be salvaged. Thus while a Panther was superior to a Sherman in the hands of an experienced crew, inadequate training, coupled with Sherman numerical superiority, resulted in a poor combat performance for the vehicle during the offensive.

=== Use in fortifications ===
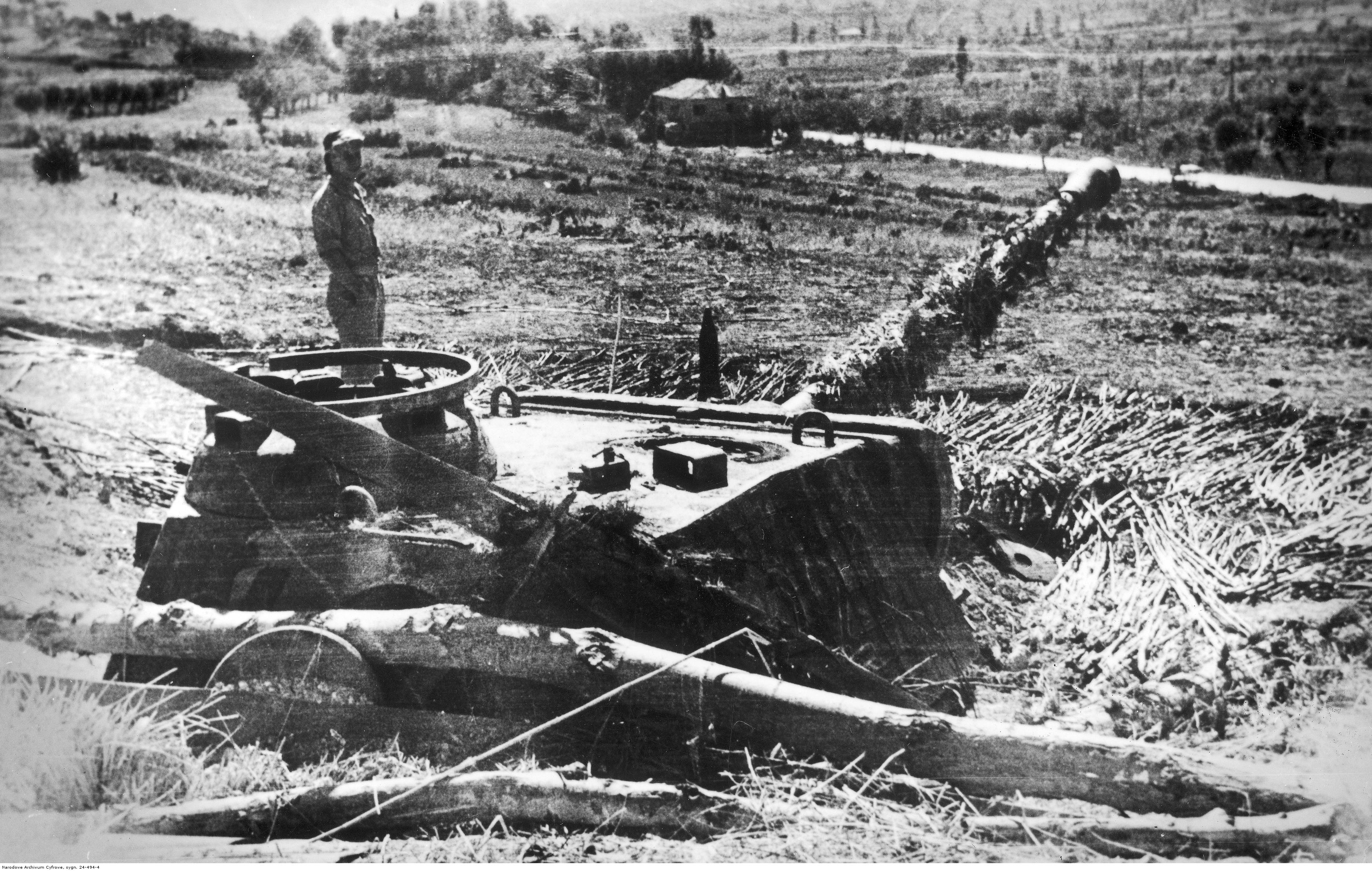
Pantherturm fortification along the Gothic Line in Italy, August 1944

From 1943, Panther turrets were mounted in fixed fortifications known officially as Ringstände (the type was called "Tobruks" because the practice first encountered during the North African campaign around the port of Tobruk).

Two types of turret emplacements were used: Pantherturm III – Betonsockel (concrete base) and Pantherturm I – Stahluntersatz (steel sub-base). Some used normal production turrets, but most were reinforced with additional roof armour to withstand artillery fire. They housed ammunition storage and fighting compartment along with crew quarters. A total of 182 of these were installed in the fortifications of the Atlantic Wall and Siegfried Line (Westwall), 48 in the Gothic Line and Hitler Line, 36 on the Eastern Front, and two for training and experimentation, for a total of 268 installations by March 1945. They proved costly to attack, and difficult to destroy.

=== Battalion organisation ===
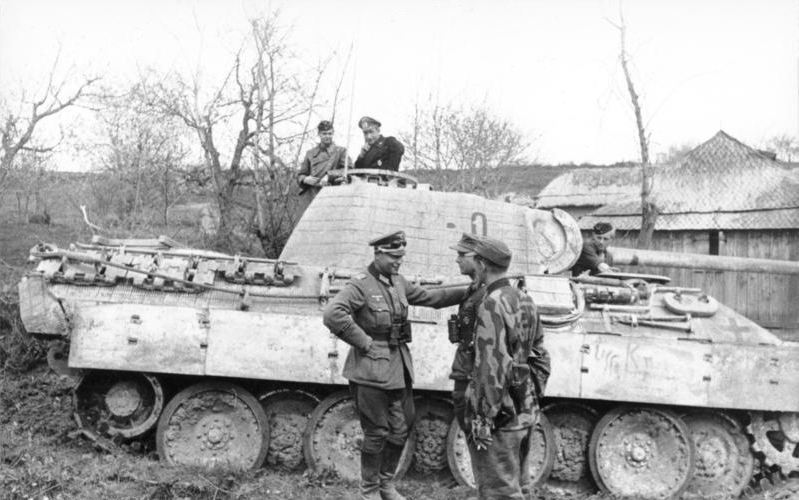
Panzerbefehlswagen Panther Ausf. A (Sd.Kfz. 267) of the Panzergrenadier-Division Großdeutschland photographed in southern Ukraine in 1944

From September 1943, one Panzer battalion with 96 Panthers which constituted the Panzer regiment of a Panzer-Division, was organised as:

- Battalion Command (composed of Communication and Reconnaissance Platoons)
  - Communication Platoon – 3 × Befehlswagen Panther Sd.Kfz. 267/268
  - Reconnaissance Platoon – 5 × Panther
- 1st Company – 22 × Panther
  - Company Command – 2 × Panther
  - 1st Platoon – 5 × Panther
  - 2nd Platoon – 5 × Panther
  - 3rd Platoon – 5 × Panther
  - 4th Platoon – 5 × Panther
- 2nd Company – 22 × Panther
- 3rd Company – 22 × Panther
- 4th Company – 22 × Panther
- Service Platoon – 2 × Bergepanther Sd.Kfz. 179

From 3 August 1944, the new Panzer-Division 44 organisation called for a Panzer division to consist of one Panzer regiment with two Panzer battalions, one of 96 Panzer IVs and one of 96 Panthers. Actual strengths tended to differ, and became far lower after losses.

=== Reliability ===
Percentage of late war panzer models operational
Date	Western front			Eastern front		
Date	Pz IV	Panther	Tiger	Pz IV	Panther	Tiger
31 May 44	88	82	87	84	77	79
14 Sep 44	80	74	98	65	72	70
30 Sep 44	50	57	67	65	60	81
31 Oct 44	74	85	88	52	54	54
15 Nov 44	78	71	81	72	66	61
30 Nov 44	76	71	45	78	67	72
15 Dec 44	78	71	64	79	69	79
30 Dec 44	63	53	50	72	62	80
15 Jan 45	56	47	58	71	60	73
15 Mar 45	44	32	36	54	49	53
Average	71	65	65	68	62	70

The first production Panther tanks were plagued with mechanical problems. The engine was dangerously prone to overheating and suffered from connecting rod or bearing failures. Petrol leaks from the fuel pump or carburettor, as well as motor oil leaks from gaskets, produced fires in the engine compartment; which resulted in the total write-off of three Panthers due to fires. Transmission and final drive breakdowns were the most common and difficult to repair. A large list of other problems were detected in these early Panthers, and so from April through May 1943 all Panthers were shipped to Falkensee and Nürnberg for a major rebuilding program. This did not correct all of the problems, so a second program was started at Grafenwoehr and Erlangen in June 1943. Reliability improved with the Ausf. A and later G of the Panther, with availability rates going from an average of 37% by end of 1943 to an average of 54% in 1944.

The first Panthers saw combat at Kursk in summer 1943, revealing reliability issues beyond that typically expected for a new weapon system. Combat readiness remained low throughout 1943. A contemporary report reported that, "Until reaching the first preparation area, 50% of the vehicles were inoperative: 2/3 of them with engine breakdowns and 1/3 with and lateral transmission system." Fuel pump failures were also common. The Panther's operational rate at the end of July 1943 was only 16 percent.

After measures taken by Maybach from the beginning of 1944, the reliability and service life of the HL230 engine increased significantly, in practice equalling that of the HL120 engine found in the Panzer III and Panzer IV.

The various improvements began to have an effect on the combat-ready rate of the tanks deployed on the Eastern Front, which increased from 37% in February, to 50% in April, and 78% by the end of May 1944. In September and October 1944, further modifications were fitted into the final drives as countermeasures to the reported problems including worn gear teeth, parts, bearings, and insufficient lubrication.

== Allied response ==
=== Soviet ===
The Tiger I and Panther tanks were German responses to encountering the T-34 in 1941. Soviet firing tests against a captured Tiger in April 1943 showed that the T-34's 76 mm gun could not penetrate the front of the Tiger I; and could only penetrate the side at very close range. An existing Soviet 85 mm anti-aircraft gun, the D-5T, also proved disappointing. Several captured German Tiger I tanks were shipped to Chelyabinsk, where they were subjected to 85 mm fire from various angles. The 85 mm gun could not reliably penetrate the Tiger I except at ranges within the lethal envelope of the Tiger I's own 88 mm gun. The Soviets had already embarked on the 85-mm-gun upgrade path before encountering the Panther tank at the Battle of Kursk.

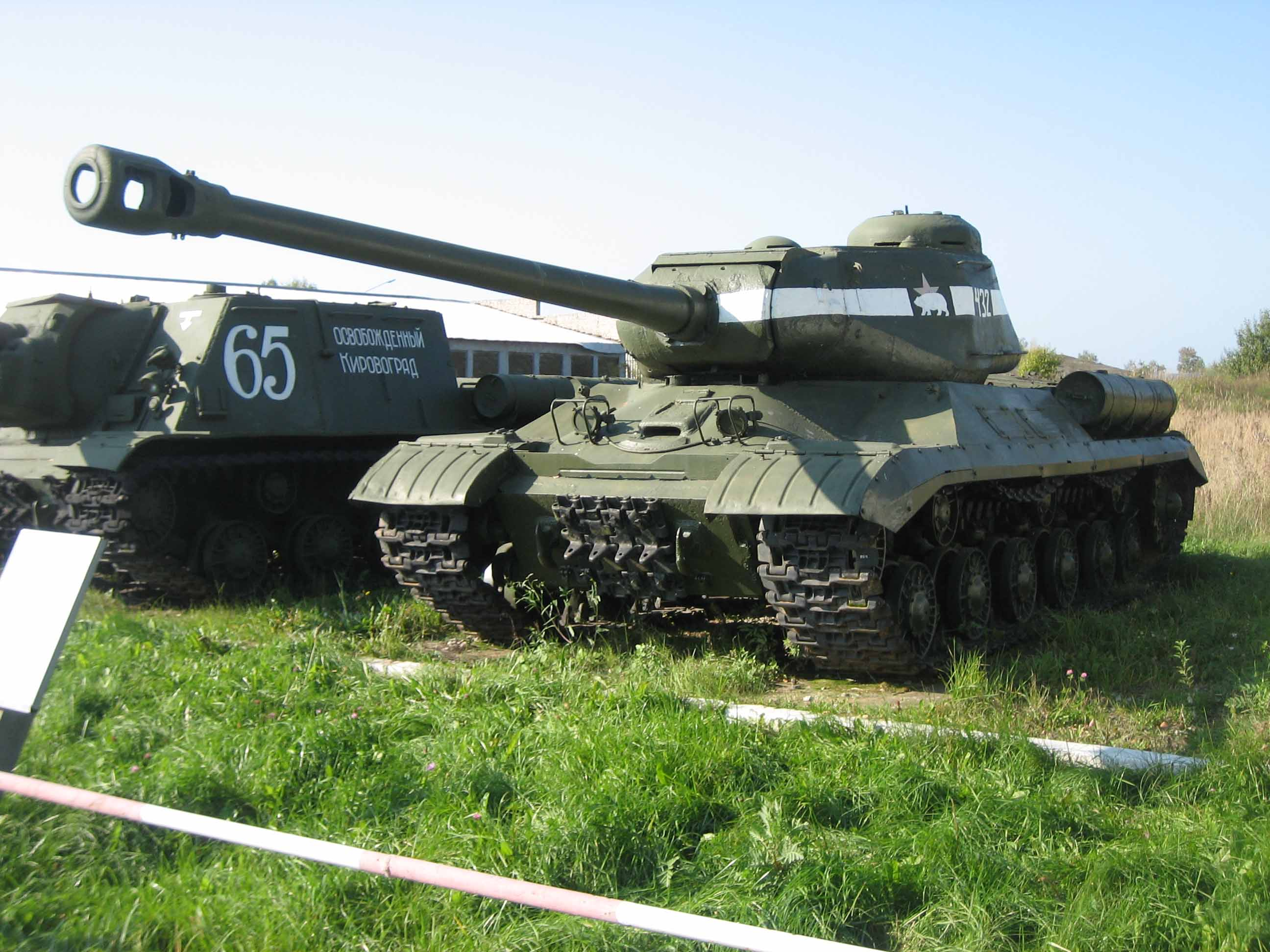
IS-2 at the Kubinka Tank Museum

The Battle of Kursk convinced the Soviets of the need for even greater firepower. A Soviet analysis of the battle in August 1943 showed that a Corps artillery piece, the A-19 122 mm gun, had done well against the German armoured fighting vehicles in that battle, and so development work on the 122 mm-equipped IS-2 began in late 1943. First encounters with enemy tanks revealed that the 122 mm BR-471 shell could punch through the Panther's frontal armour at a range of 600–700 m (660–770 yd). The early results of the IS-2's combat employment, which were confirmed by firing tests in Kubinka 1944, compelled the designers to seek innovative solutions. According to German tactical instructions, a Panther had to close to 600 m (660 yd) to guarantee penetration of the IS-2's frontal armour, while the IS-2 could penetrate the Panther at ranges of 1,000 m (1,100 yd).

A Wa Prüf 1 report states that when set at a 30-degree angle the glacis plate of the Panther could not be penetrated by the 122 mm BR-471 AP shell, the lower glacis could be penetrated from 100 m (110 yd), the turret mantlet from 500 m (550 yd) and the turret front from 1,500 m (1,600 yd). The Panther's 75 mm gun could penetrate the IS-2 model 1943's mantlet from 400 m (440 yd), turret from 800 m (870 yd), and driver's front plate from 600 m (660 yd). From the side, the Panther's armour was penetrable by the 122 mm D-25T from over 3,500 m (3,800 yd). The Panther carried more ammunition and had a faster firing cycle: for every 1–1.5 shots of the IS-2, the Panther and Tiger could fire 3-4 times. With the addition of a semi-automatic drop breech over the previously manual screw, this breech modification increased the IS-2's rate of fire to 3-4 rounds per minute.

The IS-2 proved to have surprisingly good anti-tank capabilities due to the D-25T's extremely heavy HE projectiles. Standard doctrine for purpose-built anti-tank guns of the period universally relied on small, dense solid projectiles propelled to high velocities, optimized for punching through armour. However, the 122 mm HE shell would easily blow off the turret, drive sprocket and tread of the heaviest German tank even if it could not penetrate its armour.

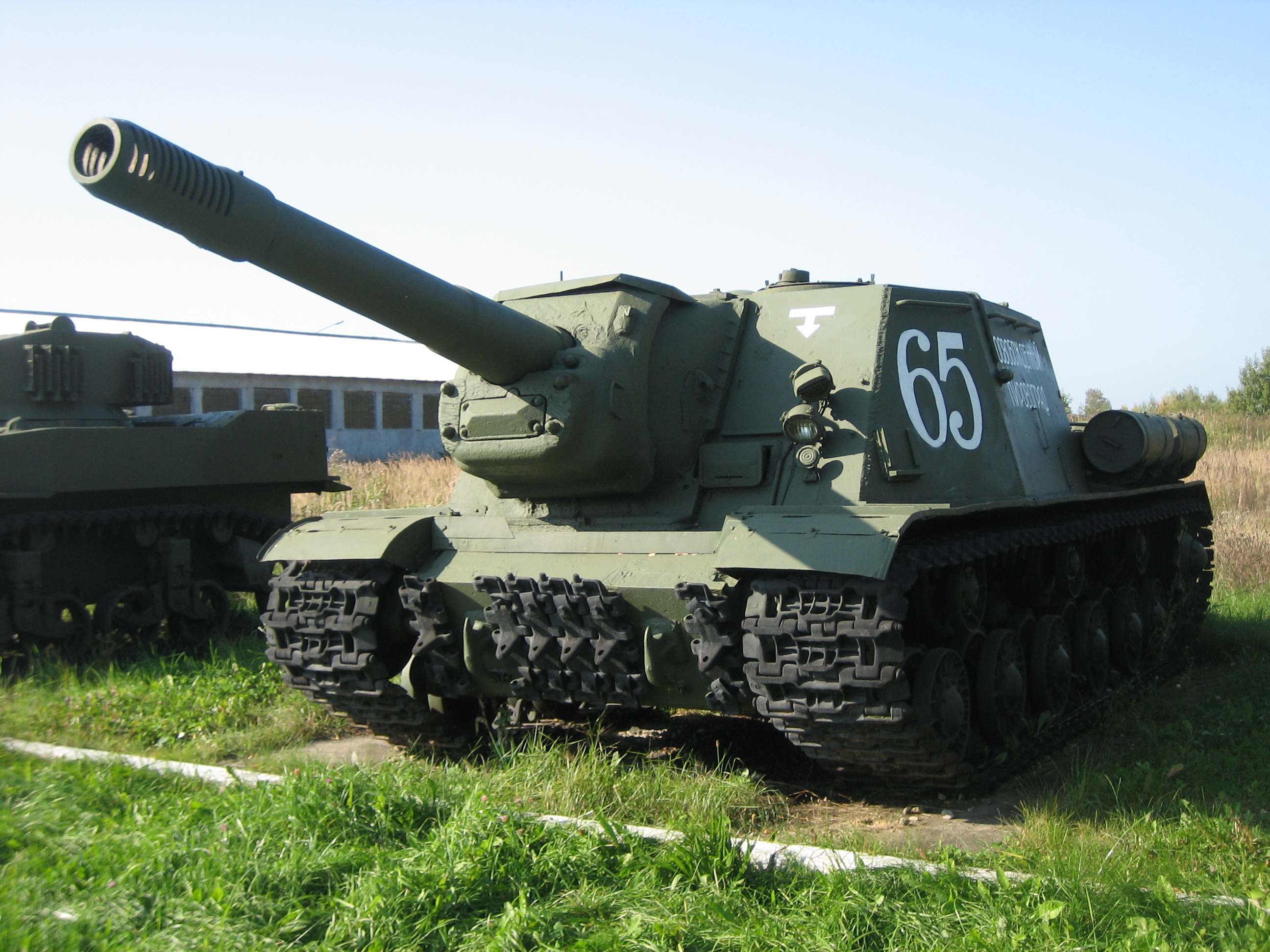
An ISU-152 in Kubinka, Russia

The SU-152 self-propelled heavy howitzer was produced in large numbers throughout 1943, with the first SU-152s being issued to new heavy mechanised gun regiments raised in May 1943. It mounted a 152 mm gun-howitzer on the chassis of a KV-1S heavy tank. Later production used an IS tank chassis and was re-designated ISU-152. Because of its adopted role as an impromptu heavy tank destroyer, capable of knocking out the heaviest German armoured vehicles — Tiger and Panther tanks, and Elefant tank destroyers — it was nicknamed Zveroboy ("Beast Slayer"). As a self-propelled artillery piece, the SU-152 was generally issued with HE rounds rather than armour-piercing projectiles. The 152mm HE round produced a massive blast that did not rely on velocity for its effectiveness, making them effective against any German tank. It was renowned for its ability to rip the turret completely off a Panther or Tiger tank (at any range) by sheer blast effect alone, and numerous German AFVs were claimed as destroyed or damaged by SU-152 fire during the Battle of Kursk.

Early 1945, the SU-100 tank destroyer saw extensive service, when Soviet forces defeated the German Operation Frühlingserwachen offensive at Lake Balaton. The SU-100 quickly proved itself to be able to penetrate around 125 mm (4.9 in) of vertical armour from a range of 2,000 m (1.2 mi) and the sloped 80 mm (3.1 in) front armour of the Panther from 1,500 m (0.93 mi).

=== American and British ===
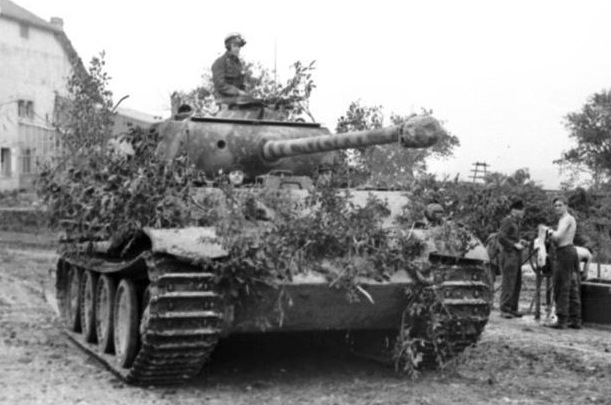
Panther tank with bush camouflage in Northern France, 1944

The Western Allies were aware of the Panther and had access to technical details through the Soviets, but there was a difference in the American and British camps as to the significance of the tank. After taking two years to catch up with German tank design in Africa, the British were wary of falling behind yet again. They had developed the excellent 17-pounder anti-tank gun, but did not yet have a vehicle in service that could fit this large gun into its turret. For its part, the U.S. Army did not believe that the Panther would be a significant problem, and did not foresee their armoured forces having to fight pitched engagements against large numbers of Panthers. The Panther was not seen in combat by the Western Allies until early 1944 at Anzio in Italy, where Panthers were employed in small numbers. Until just before D-Day (6 June 1944), the Panther was thought to be another heavy tank that would not be built in large numbers.

Shortly before D-Day, Allied intelligence reported that large numbers of Panthers were being used in the Panzer divisions, and an attempt was made to investigate Panther production. Using a statistical analysis of the serial numbers on the road wheels on two captured tanks, U.S. intelligence estimated Panther production for February 1944 to be 270 units, much greater than what had been anticipated.. This estimate was very accurate, especially compared to previous methods, as German records after the war showed production of Panthers for the month of February 1944 was 276. This indicated that the Panther would be encountered in much larger numbers than had previously been thought. In the planning for the Battle of Normandy, the U.S. Army expected to face a handful of German heavy tanks alongside large numbers of Panzer IVs. At this point, it was too late to prepare to face the Panther. As it turned out, 38% of the German tanks in Normandy were Panthers, whose frontal armour could not be penetrated by the 75 mm guns of the US M4 Sherman.

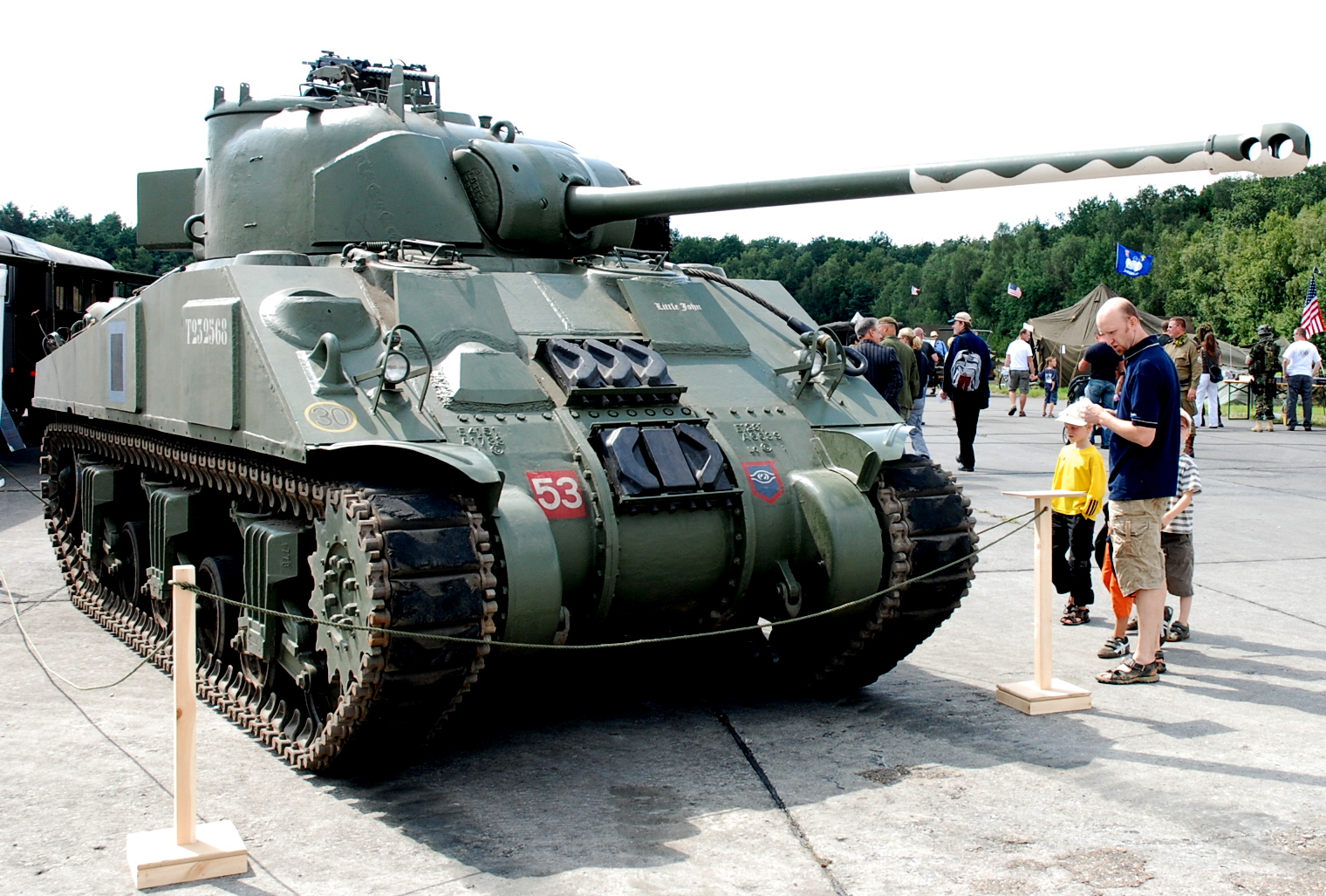
A preserved Sherman Firefly Mk Ic (2008); its gun barrel is painted with the countershading pattern used to disguise its length

The British recognised the danger posed by the increasing armour-strength of German tanks, and work started in 1941 on a more powerful anti-tank gun which appeared in service from February 1943. The Cromwell tank was to use a 50-calibre long 75mm "High Velocity" gun. When these programmes were delayed, a stop-gap solution was found. The 17-pounder could through modifications be fitted to a Sherman, and orders for this Sherman Firefly were placed in 1943. By the time of the Normandy invasion, 340 Sherman Fireflies were available to the Commonwealth armoured divisions. The British lobbied for American production lines to be modified to produce Fireflies, but these suggestions were declined by the U.S. Army, in part due to the poor performance of British tank designs in North Africa. There were also 200 interim Cruiser Mk VIII Challenger tanks (a project begun in 1942) with the 17-pounder and other improved tank-designs were under development. British and Commonwealth tank units in Normandy were initially equipped at the rate of one Firefly in a troop with three Shermans or Cromwells. This ratio increased until, by the end of the war, half of the British Shermans were Fireflies. The Comet with a gun similar to the 17-pounder had also replaced the 75 mm gun Sherman in some British units. The 17-pounder with APCBC shot was more or less equivalent in performance to the Panther's 75 mm gun, but superior with APDS shot.

At the time, U.S. armour doctrine was dominated by the head of Army Ground Forces, Gen. Lesley McNair. An artilleryman by trade, he believed that tanks should concentrate on infantry-support and exploitation roles; leaving enemy tanks to be dealt with by the tank destroyer force, which was a mix of towed anti-tank guns and lightly armoured fighting-vehicles with open-top turrets with 3-inch (76.2 mm) (M10 tank destroyer), 76 mm (M18 Hellcat) or later, 90 mm (M36 tank destroyer) guns. This doctrine led to a lack of urgency in the U.S. Army to upgrade the armour and firepower of the M4 Sherman tank, which had previously done well against the most common German tanks – Panzer IIIs and Panzer IVs – in Africa and Italy. As with the Soviets, the German adoption of thicker armour and the 7.5 cm KwK 40 in their standard armoured-fighting-vehicles prompted the U.S. Army to develop the more powerful 76 mm version of the M4 Sherman tank in April 1944. Development of a heavier tank, the M26 Pershing, was delayed mainly by McNair's insistence on "battle need" and emphasis on producing only reliable, well-tested weapons, a reflection of America's 3,000 mi (4,800 km) supply line to Europe.

An AGF (Armored Ground Forces) policy statement of November 1943 concluded the following:

The recommendation of a limited proportion of tanks carrying a 90mm gun is not concurred in for the following reasons: The M4 tank has been hailed widely as the best tank of the battlefield today. ... There appears to be no fear on the part of our forces of the German Mark VI (Tiger) tank. There can be no basis for the T26 tank other than the conception of a tank-vs.-tank duel-which is believed to be unsound and unnecessary. Both British and American battle experience has demonstrated that the antitank gun in suitable numbers is the master of the tank. ... There has been no indication that the 76mm antitank gun is inadequate against German Mark VI tank.

U.S. awareness of the inadequacies of their tanks grew only slowly. All U.S. M4 Shermans that landed in Normandy in June 1944 had the 75 mm gun. The general purpose 75 mm M4 gun could not penetrate the Panther from the front at all, although it could penetrate various parts of the Panther from the side at ranges from 400 to 2,600 m (440 to 2,840 yd). The 76 mm gun could also not penetrate the front hull armour of the Panther, but could penetrate the Panther turret mantlet at very close range. In August 1944, the HVAP (high velocity armour-piercing) 76 mm round was introduced to improve the performance of the 76 mm M4 Shermans. With a tungsten core, this round could still not penetrate the Panther glacis plate, but could punch through the Panther mantlet at 730 to 910 m (800 to 1,000 yd), instead of the usual 91 m (100 yd) for the normal 76 mm round. Tungsten production shortages meant that this round was always in short supply, with only a few available per tank, and some M4 Sherman units never received any.

Whereas Sherman tanks fired rounds with a high flash powder that made them easier to spot by German tankers, rounds fired by German tanks used a low flash powder, making it harder for Allied crews to spot them. Shermans, even though they were around 15 tons lighter than Panthers, had worse cross country mobility due to their narrower tracks. A U.S. corporal stated:

I saw where some MkV tanks crossed a muddy field without sinking the tracks over five inches, where we in the M4 started across the same field the same day and bogged down.

The 90 mm M36 tank destroyer was introduced in September 1944; the 90 mm round also proved to have difficulty penetrating the Panther's glacis plate, and it was not until an HVAP version of the round was developed that it could effectively penetrate it from combat range. It was very effective against the Panther's front turret and side.

The high American tank losses in the Battle of the Bulge against a force largely of Panther tanks brought about a clamour for better armour and firepower. At General Eisenhower's request, only 76 mm gun-armed M4 Shermans were shipped to Europe for the remainder of the war. Small numbers of the M26 Pershing were also rushed into combat in late February 1945. A dramatic newsreel film was recorded by a U.S. Signal Corps cameraman of an M26 stalking and then blowing up a Panther in the city of Cologne, after the Panther had knocked out two M4 Shermans.

The production of Panther tanks and other German tanks dropped off sharply after January 1945, and eight of the Panther regiments still on the Western Front were transferred to the Eastern Front in February 1945. The result was that, for the rest of the war during 1945, the greatest threats to the tanks of the Western Allies were no longer German tanks, but infantry anti-tank weapons, such as the Panzerschreck and Panzerfaust, infantry anti-tank guns, such as the ubiquitous 7.5 cm Pak 40, and tank destroyers, such as the Marder, StuG III, StuG IV, and Jagdpanzer. A German Army status report dated 15 March 1945 showed 117 Panthers left in the entire Western Front, of which only 49 were operational.

== Further development ==
=== Panther II ===
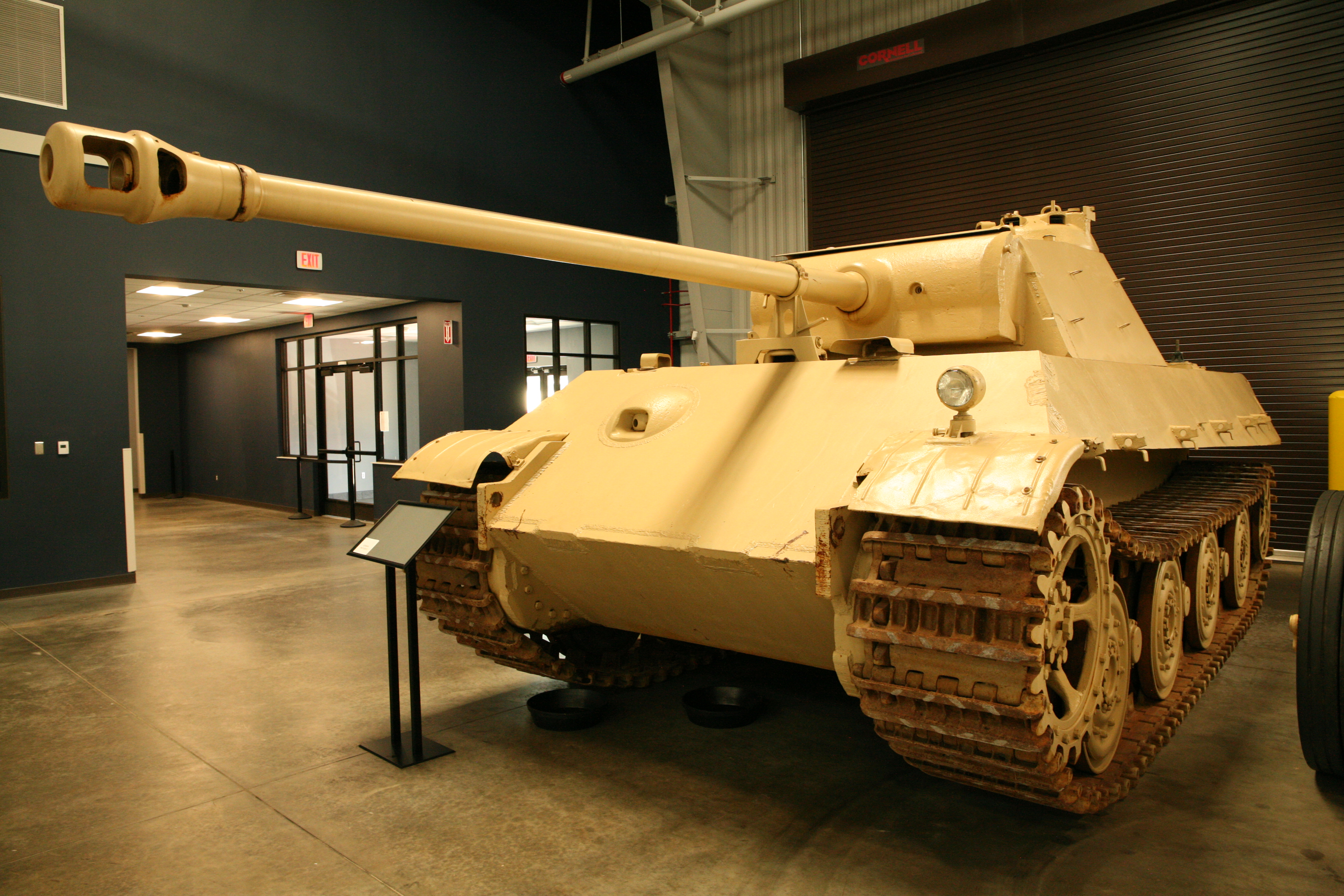
Panther II on display at the U.S. Army Armor & Cavalry Collection, Fort Benning. The turret on display was not originally fitted to this hull and was installed later.

The early impetus for upgrading the Panther came from the concern of Hitler and others that it lacked sufficient armour. Hitler had already insisted on an increase in its armour once, early in its design process in 1942. Discussions involving Hitler in January 1943 called for further increased armour; initially referred to as Panther 2 (it became the Panther II after April 1943). This upgrade increased the thickness of the glacis plate to 100 mm (3.9 in), the side armour to 60 mm (2.4 in), and the top armour to 30 mm (1.2 in). Production of the Panther 2 was slated to begin in September 1943.

On 10 February 1943, Dr. Wiebecke (chief design engineer for MAN) suggested thoroughly redesigning the Panther II and incorporating Tiger components such as the steering gears, final drive, entire suspension, and turret based on Eastern Front experience. Total weight would increase to more than 50 metric tons. Another meeting on 17 February 1943 focused on sharing and standardizing parts between the Tiger II tank and the Panther II, such as the transmission, all-steel 80 cm diameter road-wheels (only overlapping and not interleaved as the original Schachtellaufwerk road-wheel design used) and running gear. In March 1943, MAN indicated that the first prototype would be completed by August 1943. A number of engines were under consideration, among them the new Maybach HL234 fuel-injected engine (900 hp operated by an 8-speed hydraulic transmission) and the BMW 003 aviation turbojet-derived, GT 101 turboshaft powerplant, planned to be of some 1,150 shaft horsepower output and weighing only some 450 kg (992 lb) without its transmission, only some 38% of the weight of the Panther's standard Maybach HL230 V-12 gasoline-fueled piston engine.

Thus, plans to replace the original Panther design with the Panther II were already underway before the first Panther had even seen combat. But from May to June 1943, work on the Panther II ceased as the focus was shifted to expanding production of the original Panther tank. It is not clear if there was ever an official cancellation: this may have been because the Panther II upgrade pathway was originally started at Hitler's insistence. The direction that the design was headed would not have been consistent with Germany's need for a mass-produced tank, which was the goal of the Reich Ministry of Armament and War Production.

One Panther II chassis was completed and eventually captured by the U.S.; it was displayed at the Patton Museum in Fort Knox until 2010. It has since been moved to the National Armor and Cavalry Museum at Ft. Benning, GA. An Ausf. G turret is mounted on this chassis.

=== Ausf. F and Schmalturm turret ===
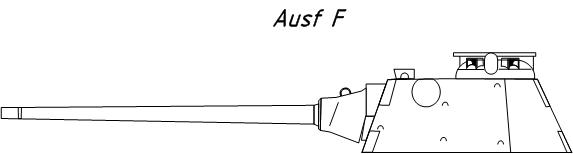
Side view of the Ausf. F turret

After the Panther II project died, a more limited upgrade of the Panther was planned, centred around a re-designed turret. The Ausf. F variant was intended for production in April 1945, but the end of war ended these plans.

The earliest known redesign of the turret was dated 7 November 1943 and featured a narrow gun mantlet behind a 120 mm (4.7 in) thick turret front plate. Another design drawing by Rheinmetall dated 1 March 1944 reduced the width of the turret front even further; this was the Turm-Panther (Schmale Blende) (Panther with narrow gun mantlet). Several experimental Schmaltürme (literally: "narrow turrets") were built in 1944 with modified versions of the production Panther's 7.5 cm KwK 42 L/70 standard gun, which were given the designation of KwK 44/1. A few were captured and shipped back to the U.S. and Britain. One badly damaged turret is on display at the Bovington Tank Museum. It had been used as a post-war range target until its historical significance was recognised.

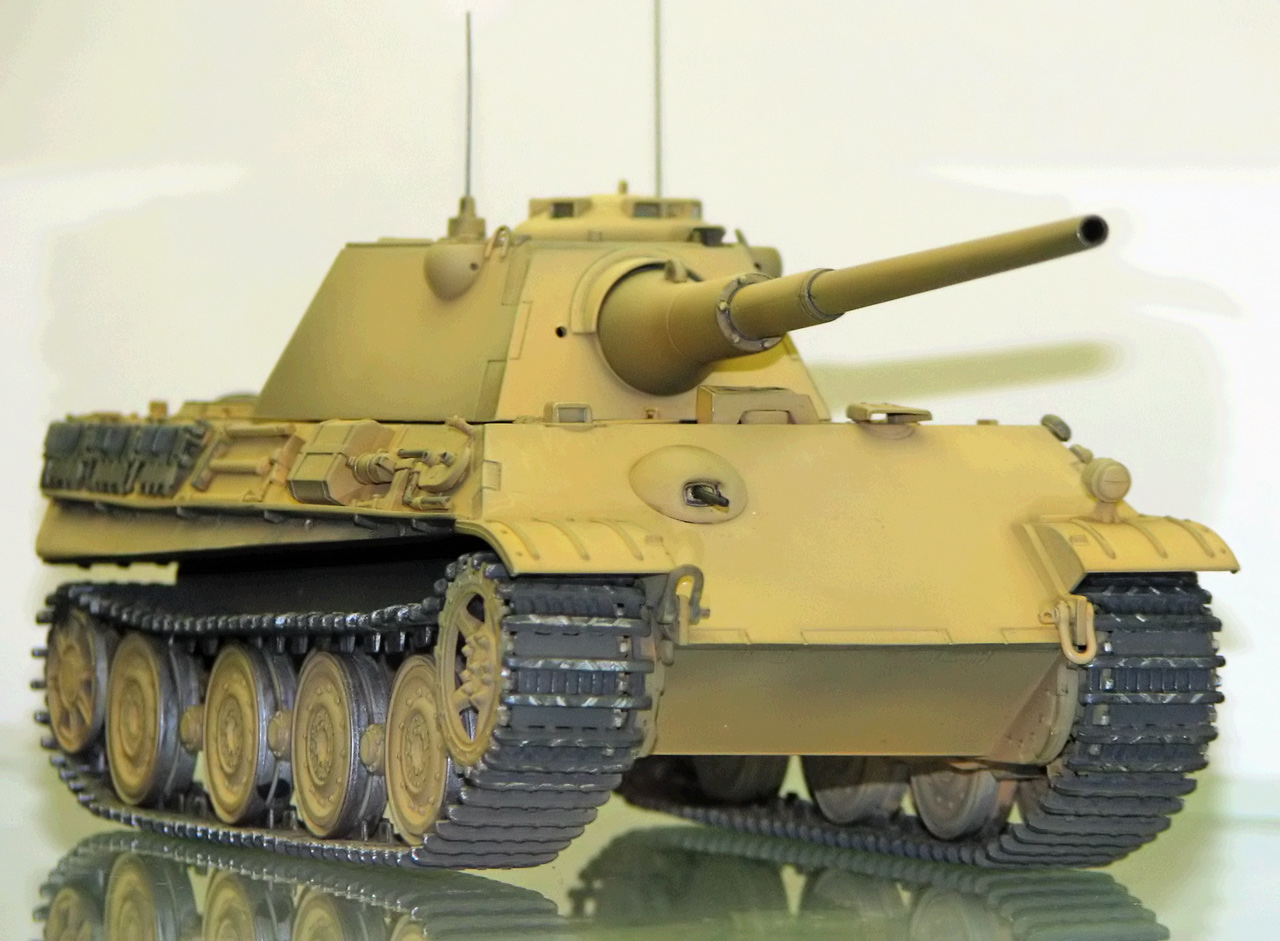
Model of Panther Ausf. F (with 80 cm diameter Tiger II wheels and transport tracks) with proposed Schmalturm, with stereoscopic sight bulges on the turret sides

The Schmalturm had a much narrower front face of 120 mm (4.7 in) armour sloped at 20 degrees; side turret armour was increased to 60 mm (2.4 in) from 45 mm (1.8 in); roof turret armour increased to 40 mm (1.6 in) from 16 mm (0.63 in); and a bell shaped gun mantlet similar to that of the Tiger II was used. This increased armour protection also had a slight weight saving due to the overall smaller size of the turret. The Schmalturm also addressed an inherent flaw with the earlier rounded mantlet in which incoming shots would ricochet off the lower half of the mantlet plate and go through the hull roof or into the turret ring.

The Panther Ausf. F would have had the Schmalturm, with its better ballistic protection, and an extended front hull roof which was slightly thicker. The Ausf. F's Schmalturm was to have a built-in stereoscopic rangefinder — using twin matching armoured blisters, one on each turret side, much like the Americans' post-war M47 Patton tank — and lower weight than the original turrets. A number of Ausf. F hulls were built at Daimler-Benz and Ruhrstahl-Hattingen steelworks; there is no evidence that any completed Ausf. F saw service before the end of the war.

=== E-50 ===
The E series of experimental tanks — E-10, E-25, E-50, E-75, E-100 (the numbers designated their weight class) — was proposed to further streamline production with an even greater sharing of common parts and simplification of design. In this scheme, the Panther tank would have been replaced by the E-50. A Belleville washer-based, hull sidemount suspension system was proposed to replace the complex and costly dual torsion bar system. The Schmalturm would have been used, likely with a variant of the 8.8 cm L/71 gun.

=== Upgunning to the 8.8 cm ===
During the development of the Schmalturm turret, Krupp proposed an up-gunned varriant using the 8.8 cm KwK 43 L/71 and modifying the turret minimally. Several drawings were made. Krupp's drawing Hln-130 shows that the gun was to be mounted 35 cm further forward than the 7.5 cm, with the gun carriage being 35 cm further back. This necessitated an extension to the turret. However, the gun still reduced internal space, making it harder to load. Krupp's Hln-E142 drawing, called ´Pz.Kpfw. “Panther” mit 8.8 cm L/71 (Kw.K.43)´, dating back to November 17, 1944, shows that the 8.8 would have had depression/elevation angles of -8/15 and would have lengthened the tank to 9.25 meters long.

On January 23, 1945, a meeting was held by the Entwicklungskommission in which the project was handed over to Daimler-Benz. The turret ring of the Daimler-Benz Panther-Schmalturm-8.8 cm was enlarged by 100 mm, which increased the weight by 1 tonne. For the most part, however, the design was an 8.8 cm Kw.K.43 L/71 with repositioned trunnions in a mostly unchanged Schmalturm turret. By March 1945, Daimler-Benz was slated to produce a soft-steel prototype. At this time, Krupp returned to the project under a request from Colonel Crohn. They were given the task of developing a turret for the 8.8 cm, which was an adaption of their previous design. The design was approved on March 14, 1945, with production slated to begin in the last quarter of 1945.

=== Derived vehicles ===
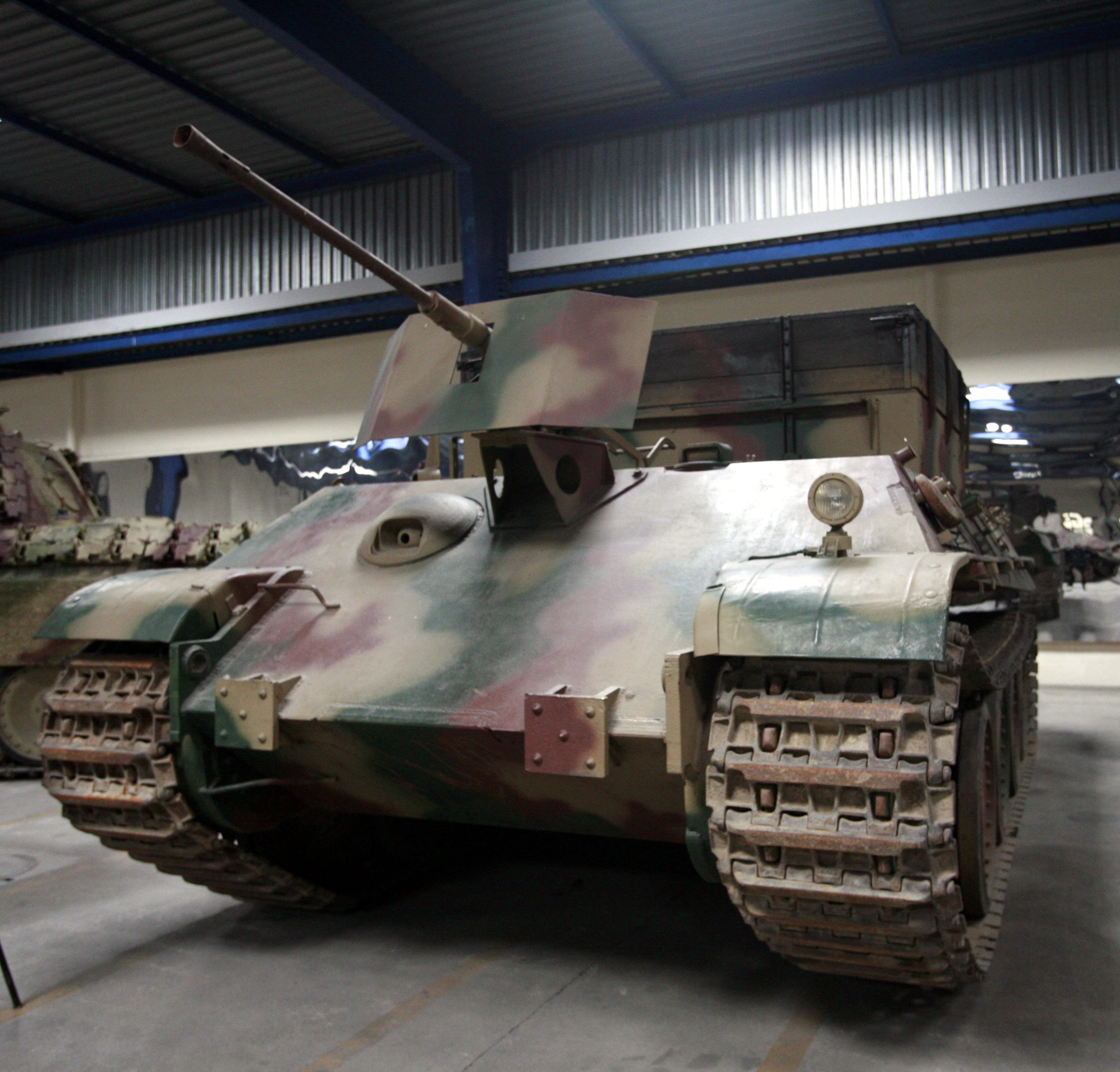
Bergepanther on display at Saumur armour museum

- Jagdpanther – heavy Jagdpanzer-style casemate-hulled tank destroyer with the 88 mm L/71 cannon
- Befehlspanzer Panther – command tank with additional radio equipment
- Beobachtungspanzer Panther – artillery observation tank armed with only two MG 34
- Bergepanther – armoured recovery vehicle
- Flakpanzer Coelian – self-propelled anti-aircraft gun project, planned to be armed with twin 37 mm Flak 43 guns in an armoured turret

== Foreign and postwar use ==
Although a technologically sophisticated vehicle, the Panther's design had a very limited influence on postwar tank development. The French postwar AMX 50 tank prototype was indirectly influenced by it through the Entwicklung series, but never entered series production. According to Steven Zaloga, the Panther was arguably "a forebearer of the modern main battle tank concept". Contemporary designs were influenced by the idea of armour and firepower but avoid the fragile automotive and unsuitability for mass production

The Panther itself also saw some limited use outside the German military, both before and after 1945.

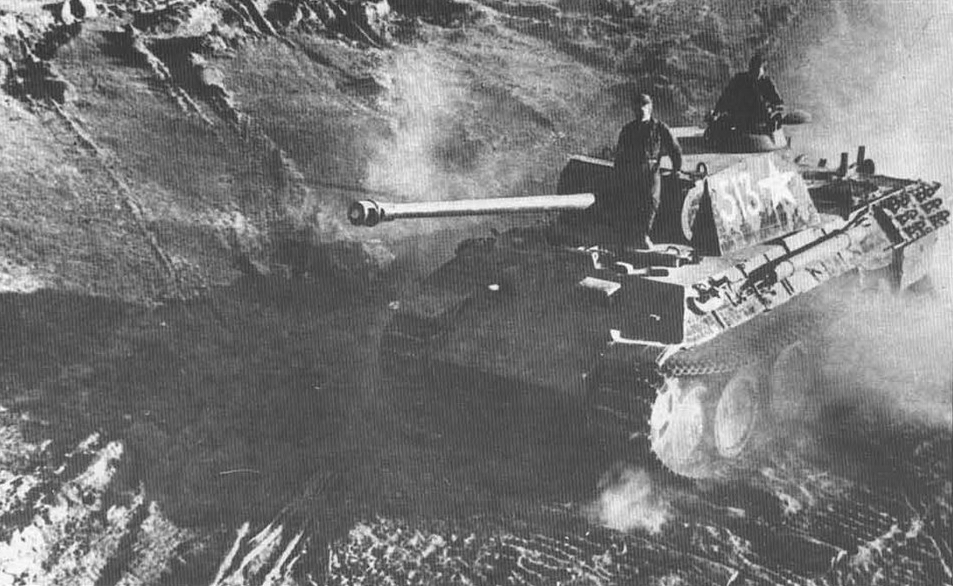
A captured Panther in Red Army use

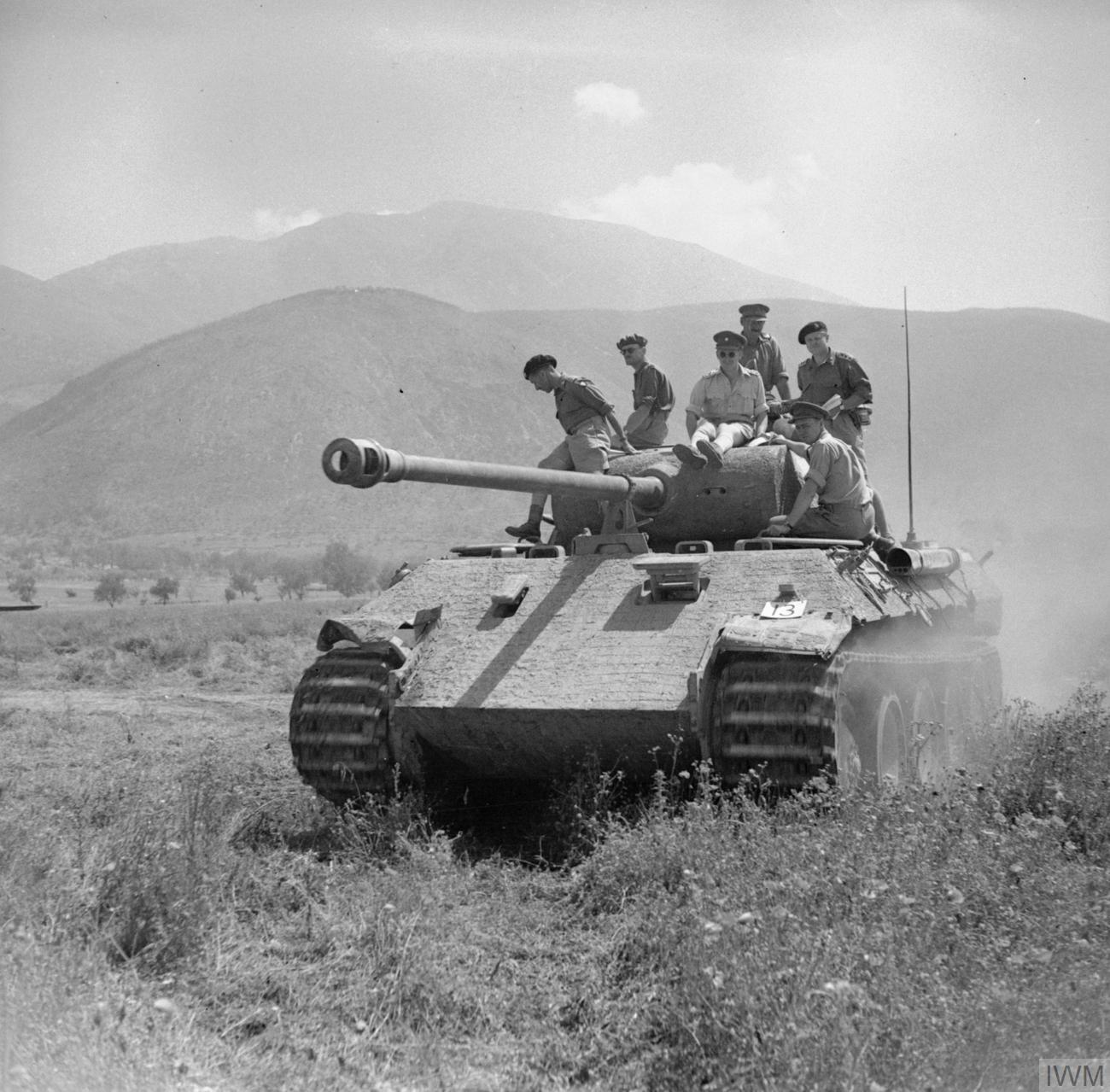
British officers ride on a captured Panther tank in Italy June 1944, with early "letterbox" hull gun aperture

During the war, the Red Army employed a number of captured Panthers. These were repainted with prominent Soviet emblems and tactical markings to avoid friendly fire incidents. Unlike captured Panzer IVs and StuGs, the Soviets generally only used Panthers and Tigers that had been captured intact and used them until they broke down, as they were too complex and difficult to transport for repair. Panzer IVs and StuGs, on the other hand, were so numerous in terms of spare parts and easy to repair that they could be used over a much longer period in combat conditions.

In July/August 1944, Hungary received at least 5 Panthers (Ausf. A or Ausf. G) which were used effectively in combat under the command of Hungarian tank ace Ervin Tarczay. They were received by the 2nd Company, 1st Battalion of the 3rd Armoured Regiment. A batch of 10-12 Panthers which were originally destined for Romania were given to Hungary in late 1944 because Romania switched sides. The Panthers took part in intense battles from early September 1944 to early 1945, fighting around the Carpathians, in the Battle of Torda and around Polgár, later making a fighting withdrawal north-west towards Budapest. The last surviving Panthers were reported to be lost in Slovakia by early 1945.

During March–April 1945, Bulgaria received 15 Panthers of various makes (D, A, and G variants) from captured and overhauled Soviet stocks; they only saw limited (training) service use. They were dug down, with automotive components removed, as pillboxes along the Bulgarian-Turkish border as early as the late 1940s. The final fate of these pillbox Panthers is unknown, but sources indicate that they were replaced and scrapped in the 1950s.

In May 1946, Romania received 13 Panther tanks from the USSR. They were initially used by the 1st Armoured Brigade, but in 1947 the equipment was ceded to the Soviet-organized "Tudor Vladimirescu Division", which was transformed from a volunteer infantry division into an armoured one. The Panther tank was officially known as T-V (T-5) in the army inventory. These tanks were in poor condition and remained in service until about 1950, by which time the Romanian Army had received T-34-85 tanks. All of the tanks were scrapped by 1954. The tanks were different models: Ausf. A, Ausf. D, and Ausf. G. They were shown to the public in 1948, during the 1 May parade in Bucharest, painted with Romanian markings. Until 1950, the T-V (T-5) was the heaviest tank available to the Romanian Army.

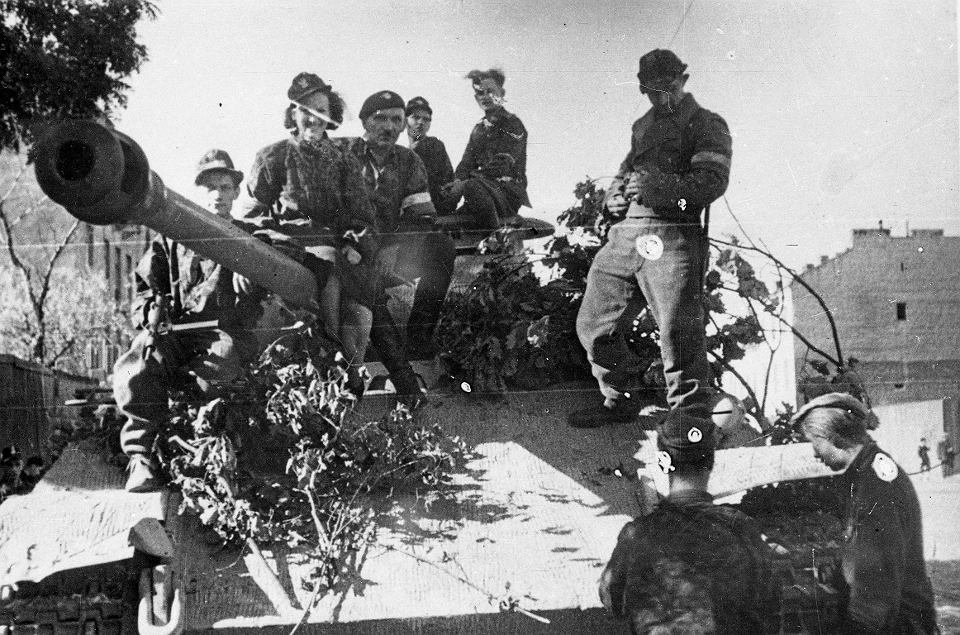
Batalion Zośka armoured platoon on a captured German Panther, 2 August 1944 during the Warsaw Uprising

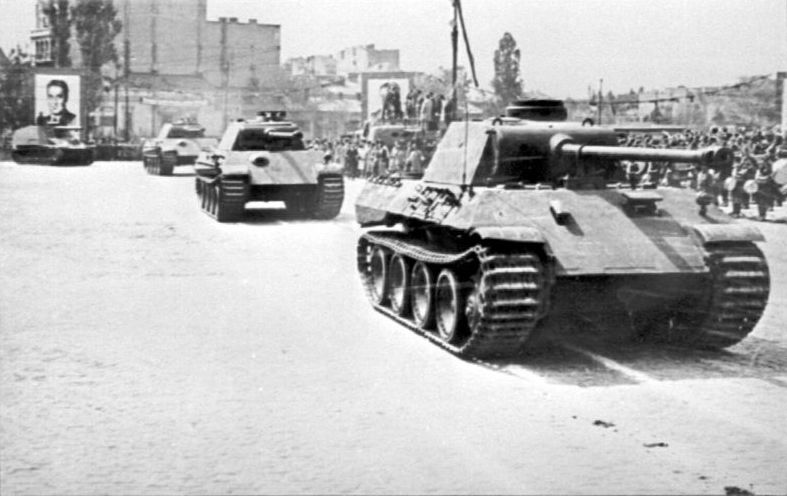
Column of Romanian Panthers (Ausf. D and G), received after the war. A Hummel SPG (identified by the front armour configuration and shorter 15cm gun compared to the Nashorn TD) can be seen in the far rear.

During the Warsaw Uprising, the Polish Home Army captured and used two Panther tanks. One, nicknamed Magda, was used by Batalion Zośka's armoured platoon under the command of Wacław Micuta to liberate the Gęsiówka concentration camp. At least one captured tank was used by the Polish People's Army post-war.

One captured vehicle (named "Cuckoo") also saw service with the British Coldstream Guards for some time.

Germany sold Japan a single Panther along with a Tiger in September 1943; by the time it was ready in 1944, it was impossible to ship due to Allied naval interdiction.

In 1946, Sweden sent a delegation to France to examine surviving specimens of German military vehicles. During their visit, the delegates found a few surviving Panthers and had one shipped to Sweden for further testing and evaluation, which continued until 1961. The tank is on display in the Deutsches Panzermuseum in Munster.

After the war, France was able to recover enough operable vehicles and components to equip the French Army's 503e Régiment de Chars de Combat with a force of 50 Panthers from 1944 to 1952, with about a dozen remaining in use by that time. In 1947, the French War Ministry wrote an evaluation of them entitled Le Panther 1947. These remained in service despite being partially replaced by French-built ARL 44 heavy tanks.

The last production Panthers were produced at the factory just after the end of World War II, using available components, by German staff under the supervision of the Royal Electrical and Mechanical Engineers (REME). Nine Panthers and twelve Jagdpanthers were produced and shipped back to Britain for post-war trials. A complete Panther and a complete Jagdpanther from that production batch are now at the Bovington Tank Museum in Dorset.

== Gallery ==
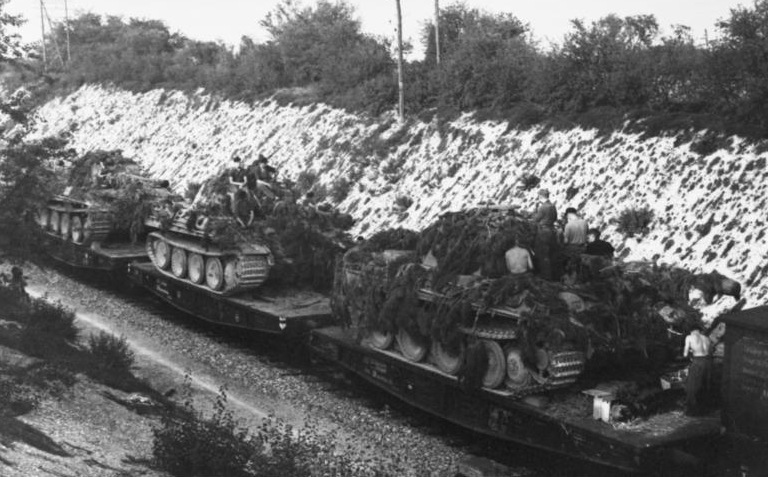
Panthers, already with bush camouflage attached, being transported by rail to the front in France.

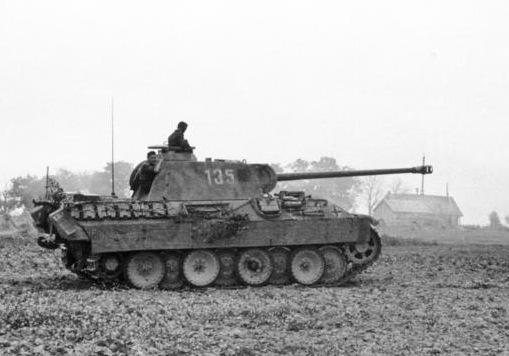
Panther with full Schürzen spaced armour attached, intended to supplement the side armour above the roadwheels.

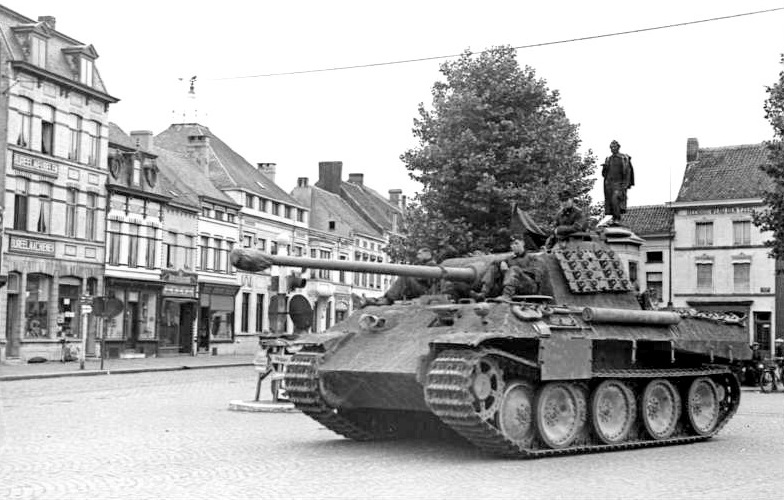
Panther with Schürzen partially attached. They were difficult to maintain in place when travelling through heavy brush.

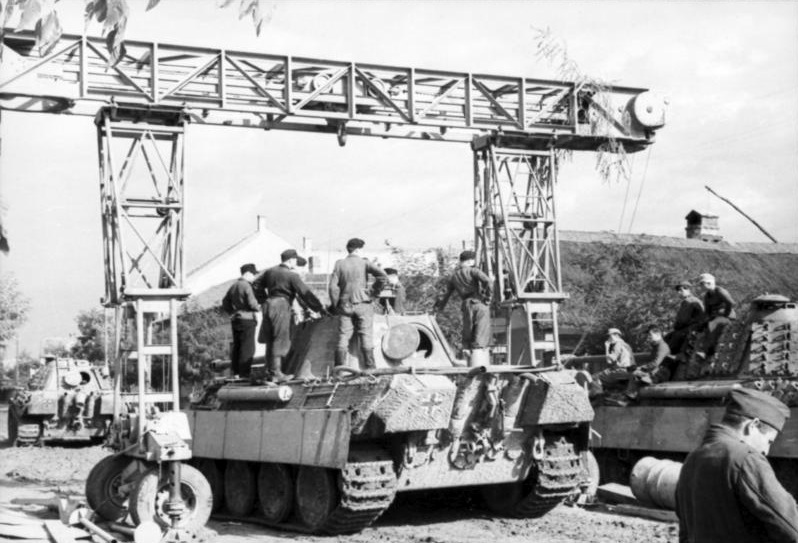
The Strabokran moving gantry was indispensable to maintain the Panther tank in the field.

== Surviving vehicles ==
In working order

- American Heritage Museum, Greater Boston, USA. Ausf. A
- Musée des Blindés, France. Ausf. A
- Deutsches Panzermuseum, Munster, Germany. Ausf. A command tank (the original engine replaced with a Daimler-Benz MB 837 Aa-500 from a Kanonenjagdpanzer)
- Wehrtechnische Studiensammlung, Koblenz, Germany. Ausf. G. Completed after the war in the Panther factory under supervision by UK REME engineers, used for tests
- Kubinka Tank Museum, Russia. Ausf. G
- The Australian Armour and Artillery Museum, Australia. Ausf. A (restored to working order in 2020, previously owned by Rex & Rod Cadman Collection in the UK)

More or less intact, but not in working order

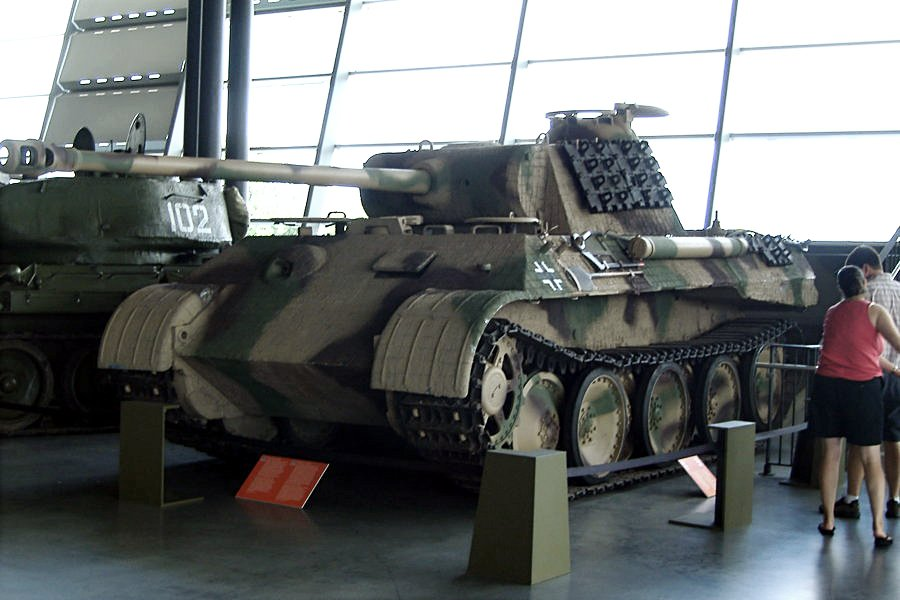
The restored Panther Ausf. A on display at the Canadian War Museum in Ottawa

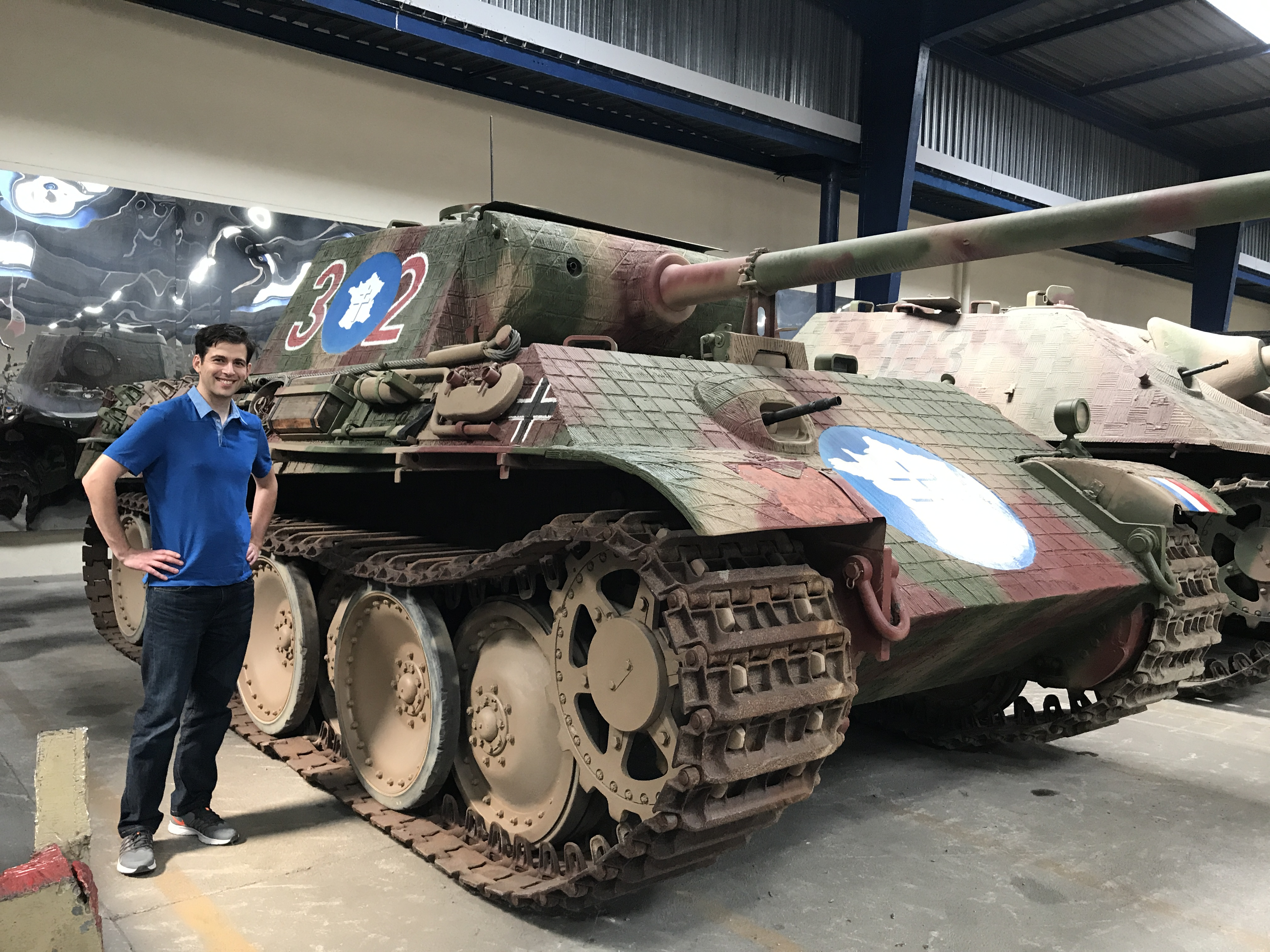
Panther that was captured by French 2nd Armoured Division in Sept. 1944 after the Battle of Dompaire, originally from the 112th Panzer Brigade, on display at Musee des Blindes, Saumur, France

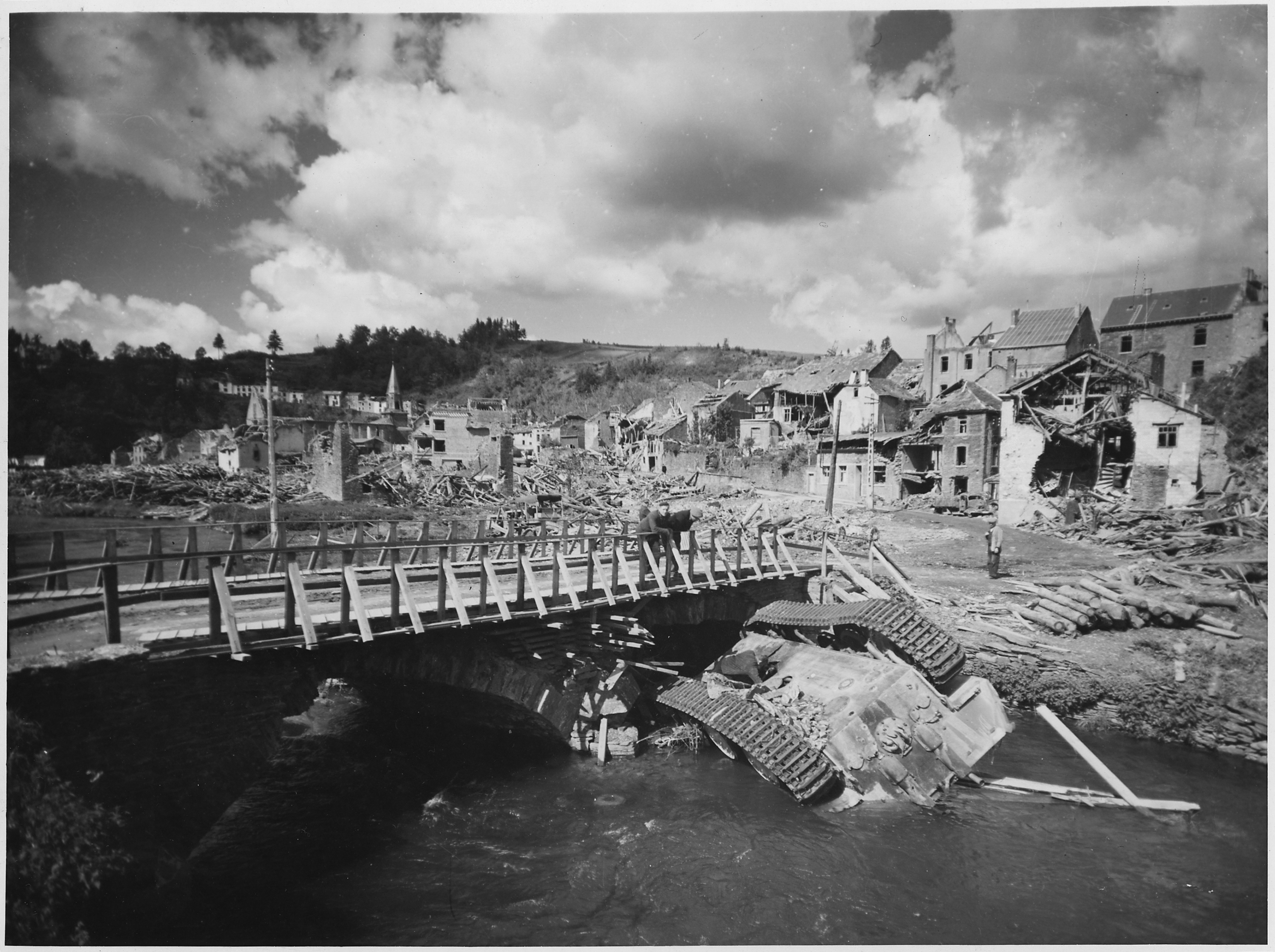
Panther in the river at Houffalize, 1945

- Canadian War Museum. In January 2008 a partially restored Panther Ausf. A was put on display. It had been donated to the museum from CFB Borden, which acquired it following V-E celebrations in May 1945. Spent two years in restoration prior to being put on display.
- Panzermuseum Thun, Thun, Switzerland. Advertised as variant D/G hybrid, with an Ausf. D hull and Ausf. G turret.
- The Wheatcroft Collection, United Kingdom. Four Panthers in the collection, all four are simultaneously being restored with most of the work beginning in 2025. Early Ausf. A (DEMAG production)
- Liberty Park, National War and Resistance Museum, Overloon, Netherlands. Ausf. G. This tank was abandoned by its crew during the Battle of Overloon after being knocked out by a PIAT, with its two running wheels on the right side being hit and its crew killed when they abandoned the tank.
- Royal Tank Museum, Jordan. Ausf. A
- Sinsheim Auto & Technik Museum, Sinsheim, Germany. Ausf. A
- Musée des Blindés, Saumur, France. Ausf. A and G
- Mourmelon-le-Grand, France. Ausf. A
- Bovington Tank Museum, United Kingdom. Ausf. G. Completed after WWII in the Panther factory under supervision by REME engineers and used for tests.
- Grandmenil, Belgium. Ausf. G
- Houffalize in the Ardennes region of Belgium. A Panther Ausf. G can be found in the village. It fell into the river during the Battle of the Bulge and was later retrieved as a memorial.
- U.S. Army Armor & Cavalry Museum, Fort Benning, USA. Four Panthers in the collection: Ausf. A; Ausf. G; late Ausf. G; Panther II hull (with late Ausf. G turret added as placeholder after the war).
- Private collector, Heikendorf, Germany. An almost intact Panther Ausf. G was found In July 2015 in the basement of a private residence near Kiel, seized by the police and later transported away by the Bundeswehr. In August 2021 a court in Kiel found the tank no longer to be useable as a weapon of war and ordered the defendant to sell it within two years to a suitable institution in exchange for a conditional discharge.
- Wilhelmina park, Breda, Netherlands. The only known complete surviving Ausf. D. This tank was donated by the Polish 1st Armoured Division after liberation of Breda. It was restored in 2004–2005 for static display by Kevin Wheatcroft in exchange for its parts.
- Kłanino tank museum, Poland. Ausf. A
- Siegfried Line Museum, Pirmasens, Germany. Pantherturm I
- Gerhard's Fort, Świnoujście, Poland. Pantherturm I

Wrecks

- Sinsheim Auto & Technik Museum, Sinsheim, Germany. Ausf. A
- Overlord Museum, Colleville-sur-Mer (ex-Falaise August 1944 museum), France. Ausf. A. Cosmetically restored and displayed in a diorama representing a Wehrmacht field repair unit.
- The Wheatcroft Collection, United Kingdom. Two Ausf. A Panthers
- Celles, Houyet, Belgium. Ausf. G
- The Tank Museum, United Kingdom. Ausf. F with Schmalturm. This is the only known remnant of the Ausf. F variant.
- Henrichshütte LWL Industrial Museum, Hattingen, Germany. Ausf. A hull
- Vogel Collection, Nürnberg, Germany. Ausf. A hull
- Fort IX of the Warsaw Fortress, Warsaw, Poland. Ausf. G hull
- White Eagle Museum, Skarżysko-Kamienna, Poland.
- Panzer Farm, Nasielsk, Poland. Ausf. A hull
- Victory Park at Poklonnaya Hill, Moscow, Russia.
- A hull—minus running gear and engine—was found buried in the courtyard of Kazan University in excellent condition; the vehicle is a Panther Ausf. D (tactical number 323) that took part in the Battle of Kursk. Kazan, Russia

== Specifications ==
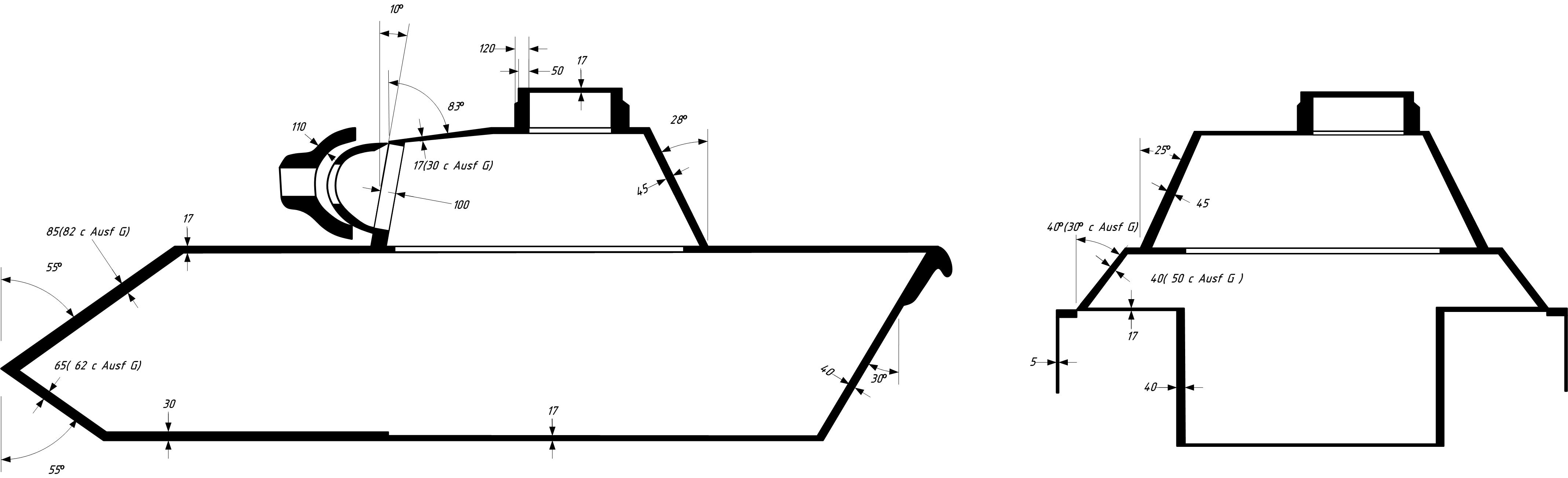
Armour thickness chart for Panther Ausf. A tank

- Crew: 5 (driver, radio operator/bow machine gunner, gunner, loader, and commander)

Dimensions

- Length: 8.86 m (29 ft 1 in) (including main gun), 6.87 m (22 ft 6 in) (hull only)
- Width: 3.27 m (10 ft 9 in) (hull only), 3.42 m (11 ft 3 in) (with skirt plates)
- Height: 2.99 m (9 ft 10 in)
- Combat weight: 44.8 tonnes (99,000 lb)

Performance

- Road speed: 55 km/h (34 mph) (at 3,000 rpm with Maybach HL230 engine)
- Road range: 260 km (160 mi)

Obstacle crossing

- Vertical obstacle: 0.9 m (2 ft 11 in)
- Trench crossing: 2.45 m (8 ft 0 in)
- Fording: 1.9 m (6 ft 3 in)

Suspension and tracks

- Type: dual torsion bar
- Shock absorbers: on 2nd and 7th swing arms on either side
- Track type: Kgs 64/660/150 dual centre guide
- Track width: 660 mm (26 in)
- Ground contact length: 3.92 m (12 ft 10 in)
- Track links: 86
- Ground pressure: 0.74 kg/cm^{2} (10.5 lbf/in^{2})

Engine and transmission

- Maybach HL230 P30 V12 four-stroke petrol engine
  - Displacement: 23.095 litres (1,409.3 cu in)
  - Compression ratio: 6.8:1
  - Fuel: petrol, 74 octane
  - Power: 700 metric horsepower (690 hp) at 3,000 rpm
  - Fuel consumption: 2.77 L/km (1.02 mpg_{‑imp}; 0.85 mpg_{‑US}) (on roads)
- Fuel capacity: 730 L (160 imp gal; 190 US gal)
- Transmission: ZF AK 7-200 synchromesh manual coupled through Fichtel & Sachs LAG 3/70H clutch
- Gears: 7 forward, 1 reverse
- Steering: MAN single-radius clutch-brake
- Steering ratio: 1:1.5

Armament

- Main gun: 75 mm (3.0 in) Kwk 42 L/70 cannon
  - Rounds carried: 79 (for Ausf. G: 82)
- Turret traversal rate: 24°/second
- Elevation: +18°/-8° (for Ausf. F: +20°/-8°)
- Primary gun sight: Leitz TZF 12 (for Ausf. A and G: TZF 12a)
  - Magnification: 2.5×/5×
  - Field of view: 28°/14°
- Radio equipment
  - Fu 5 transceiver
  - Fu 2 receiver

Armour

All angles from horizontal.

- Hull front, lower: 60 mm (2.4 in) at 35°; upper: 80 mm (3.1 in) at 35° (for Ausf. G: lower hull front reduced to 50 mm (2.0 in))
- Hull side, lower: 40 mm (1.6 in) at 90°; upper: 40 mm (1.6 in) at 50° (for Ausf. G: upper hull side changed to 50 mm (2.0 in) at 60°)
- Hull rear: 40 mm (1.6 in) at 60°
- Turret front: 100 mm (3.9 in) at 78°
- Turret side: 45 mm (1.8 in) at 65°
- Turret rear: 45 mm (1.8 in) at 65°
- Turret, top: 16 mm (0.63 in) at 5°
- Gun mantlet: 100 mm (3.9 in) rounded

== See also ==
- German tank problem
- Panther II tank
- German tanks in World War II
- List of armoured fighting vehicles of World War II
- List of WWII Maybach engines

=== Tanks of comparable role, performance and era ===
- Hungarian 44M Tas
- Soviet T-34-85 and T-44
- United States M4A3E8 "Easy Eight" and M26 Pershing
- British Comet and Centurion Mk. 1
- Japanese Type 4 Chi-To and Type 5 Chi-Ri
