= Rangefinder =

Device used to measure distances to remote objects

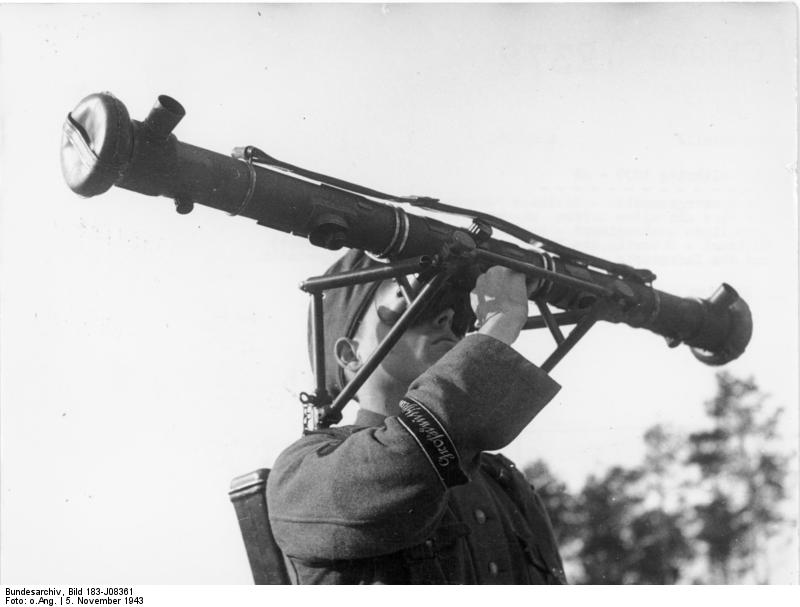
Portable German stereoscopic rangefinder from WWII

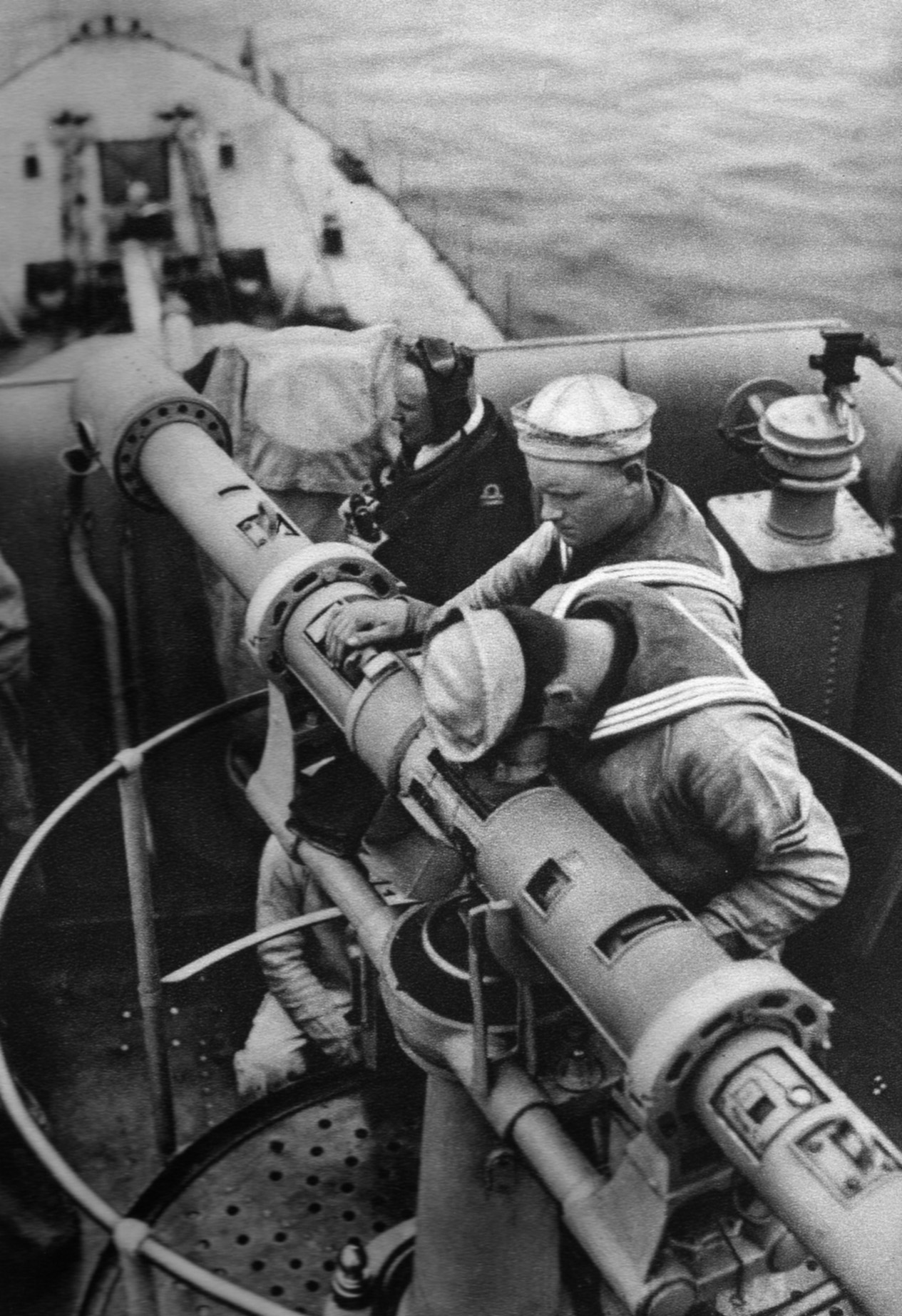
The coincidence rangefinder of the Polish destroyer ORP Wicher

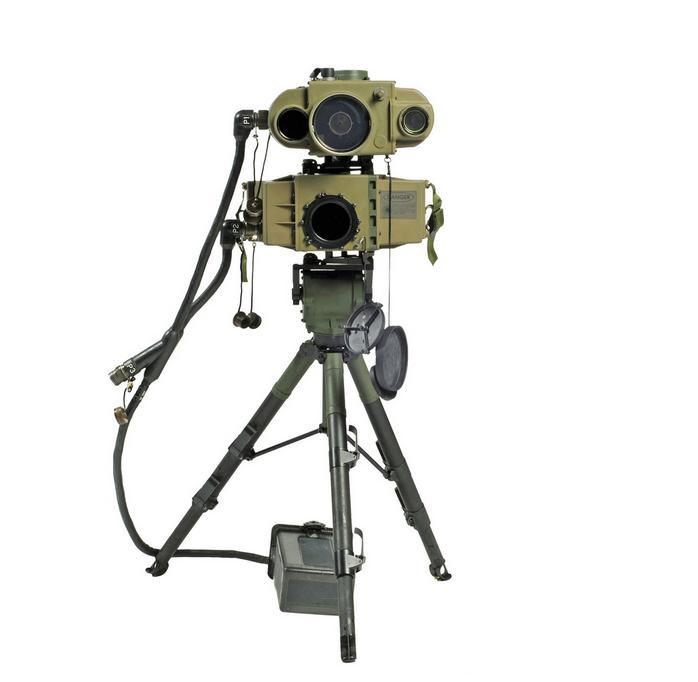
Laser rangefinder

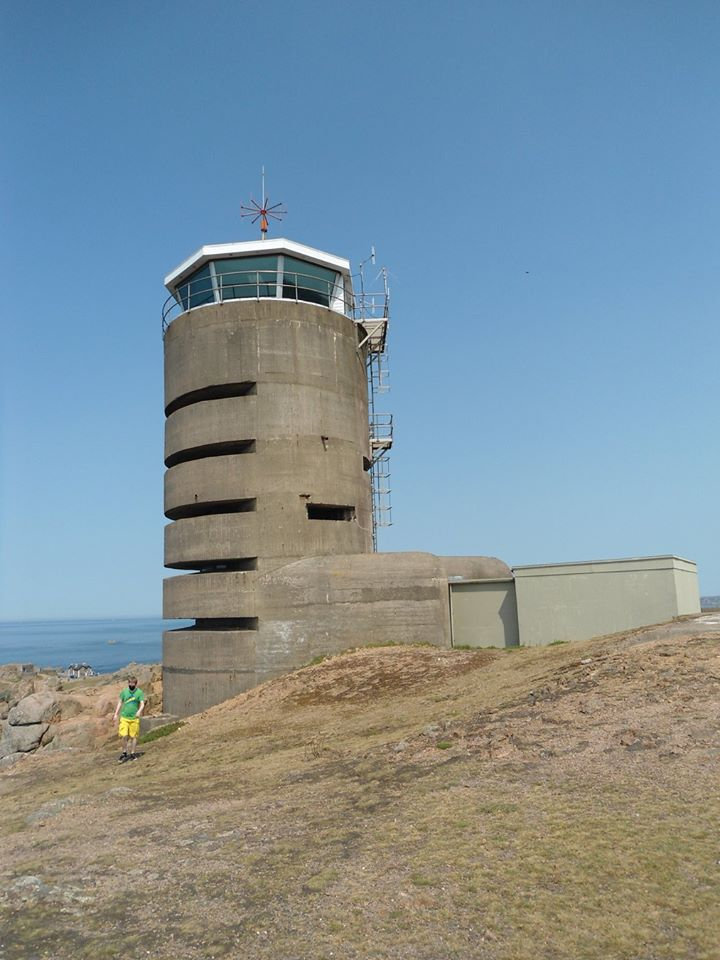
Second World War German range finding tower at La Corbière, Jersey

A rangefinder (also rangefinding telemeter, depending on the context) is a device used to measure distances to remote objects. Originally optical devices used in surveying, they soon found applications in other fields, such as photography, the military, and space travel. They were especially useful for finding the range of a target, such as in naval gunnery and anti-aircraft artillery. The word telemeter is derived from Ancient Greek τῆλε (têle) 'distant, far away' and μέτρον (métron) 'something used to measure'.

== Designs ==
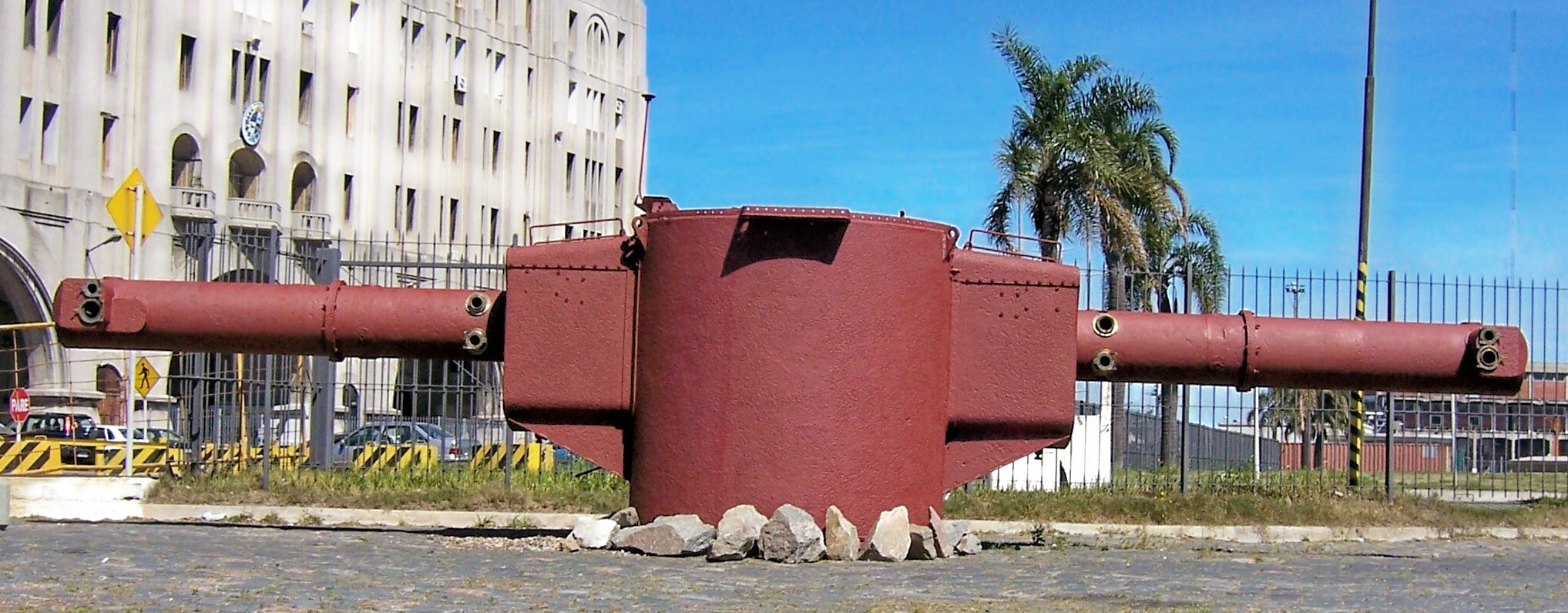
Rangefinder salvaged from the German cruiser Admiral Graf Spee on display in Montevideo

The first rangefinder telemeter was invented by James Watt in 1769 and put to use in 1771 in surveying canals. Watt called his instrument a micrometer, a term now used with a different meaning in engineering (the micrometer screw gauge). It consisted of two parallel hairs in the focal plane of a telescope eyepiece crossing an upright hair. At the point to be measured, two sliding targets on a surveyor's rod were adjusted to align with the hairs in the telescope. The distance to the rod could then be determined from the distance between the targets on the rod by trigonometry.

Several others have been credited with the invention of the rangefinder telemeter at one time or another. The Royal Society of Arts gave an award to W. Green for its invention in 1778, even though they were made aware of Watt's priority.

In 1778, Georg Friedrich Brander invented the coincidence rangefinder. Two mirrors set a distance apart horizontally in a long slim box, similar to a subtense bar but located at the measuring station, and forming two images. This rangefinder does not require a measuring rod at the target and could perhaps be considered the first true telemeter. In 1790 Jesse Ramsden invented a half-image range finder. Though Alexander Selligue is often mistakenly credited with the invention, he did invent an improved rangefinder with fixed lenses in 1821 and is responsible for coining the term.

In 1881, the British Royal Artillery adopted the depression range finder, which had been developed by Captain H.S.S. Watkin for use by coastal artillery. It used the measurement of the angle of depression from the observer, sited on a high vantage point, to the waterline of the target vessel.

In 1899, Carl Pulfrich at Carl Zeiss AG fabricated a practical stereoscopic rangefinder, based on a patent of Hector Alexander de Grousilliers.

World War II-era rangefinders worked optically with two telescopes focused on the same target but a distance apart along a baseline. The range to the target is found by measuring the difference in bearing of the two telescopes and solving the skinny triangle. Solutions can be obtained automatically, using tables or, rarely, manual calculation. The greater the distance to the target, the longer the baseline needs to be for accurate measurement. Modern rangefinders use an electronic technology such as lasers or radar.

== Laser rangefinder ==
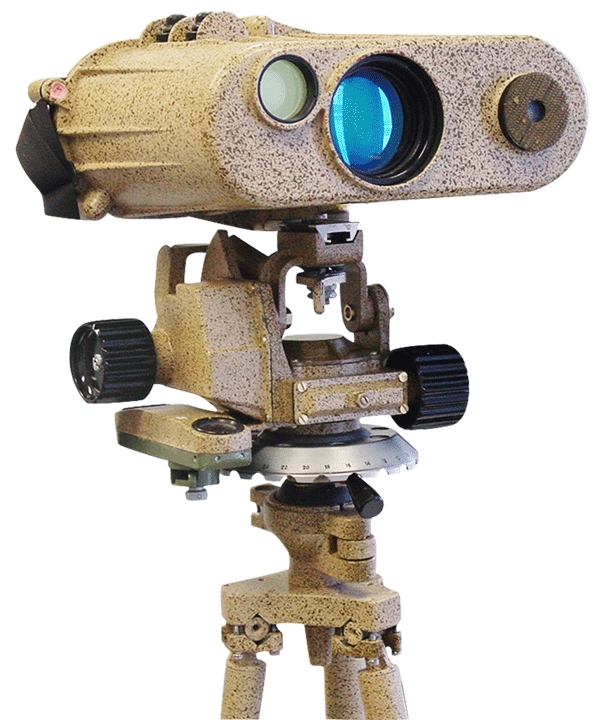
A long-range laser rangefinder is capable of measuring distance up to 20 km; mounted on a tripod with an angular mount. The resulting system also provides azimuth and elevation measurements.

A laser rangefinder, also known as a laser telemeter or laser distance meter, is a rangefinder that uses a laser beam to determine the distance to an object. The most common form of laser rangefinder operates on the time of flight principle by sending a laser pulse in a narrow beam towards the object and measuring the time taken by the pulse to be reflected off the target and returned to the sender. Due to the high speed of light, this technique is not appropriate for high precision sub-millimeter measurements, where triangulation and other techniques are often used instead. Laser rangefinders are sometimes classified as type of handheld scannerless lidar.

== Applications ==
Applications include surveying, navigation, to assist focusing in photography, choosing a golf club according to distance, and correcting aim of a projectile weapon for distance.

=== Golf ===
Laser rangefinders are used in golf to measure the yardage of a particular shot but also to gauge slope and wind as well. There has been debate over whether they should be allowed in tournaments. While their use is banned on the professional level, they are becoming widely used on the amateur level.

=== Ballistics ===
Rangefinders may be used by users of firearms over long distances, to measure the distance to a target to allow for projectile drop. Until the development of electronic means of measuring range during the Second World War, warships used very large optical rangefinders—with a baseline of many meters—to measure range for naval gunnery.

=== Archery ===
In recent decades, laser rangefinders have become popular in archery, especially among bowhunters. Rangefinders marketed for archery use will have angle-compensation features, with an internal computer calculating the horizontal distance to the target. Bowhunters will often shoot from treestands or in steep terrain, and for relatively short shots (40 yards and under), an archer will need to aim using the horizontal distance instead of the line-of-sight distance.

=== Forestry ===
Rangefinders are used for surveying in forestry. Special devices with anti-leaf filters are used.

=== Virtual reality ===
Since the 1990s, rangefinders have been used in virtual reality systems to detect operator movements and locate objects.

== See also ==
- Telemeter chronograph
- Bombsight
- Spotting scope
- Head-up display
