= Edward Norman =

Edward Norman may refer to:

- Edward Norman (historian) (1938–2026), English ecclesiastical historian
- Edward Norman (bishop) (1916–1987), Bishop of Wellington, 1973–1987
- Jim Ed Norman (born 1948), American musician, producer, and executive
- Edward Dudley Norman (1910–1998), Royal Navy and Royal Malayan Navy officer
