= Schmalturm =

Variant of turret for Panther medium tank

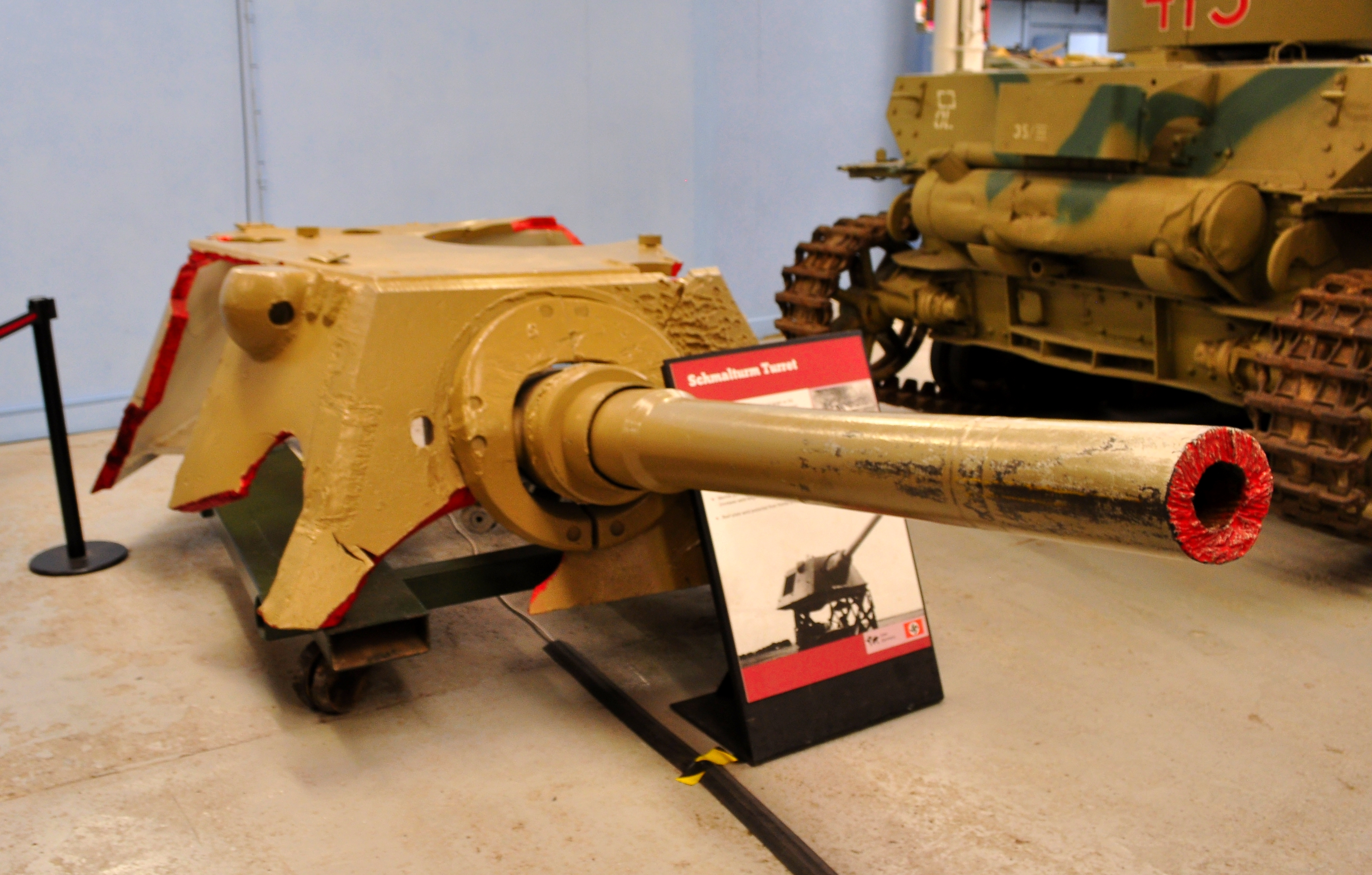
Damaged Schmalturm at the Bovington Tank Museum

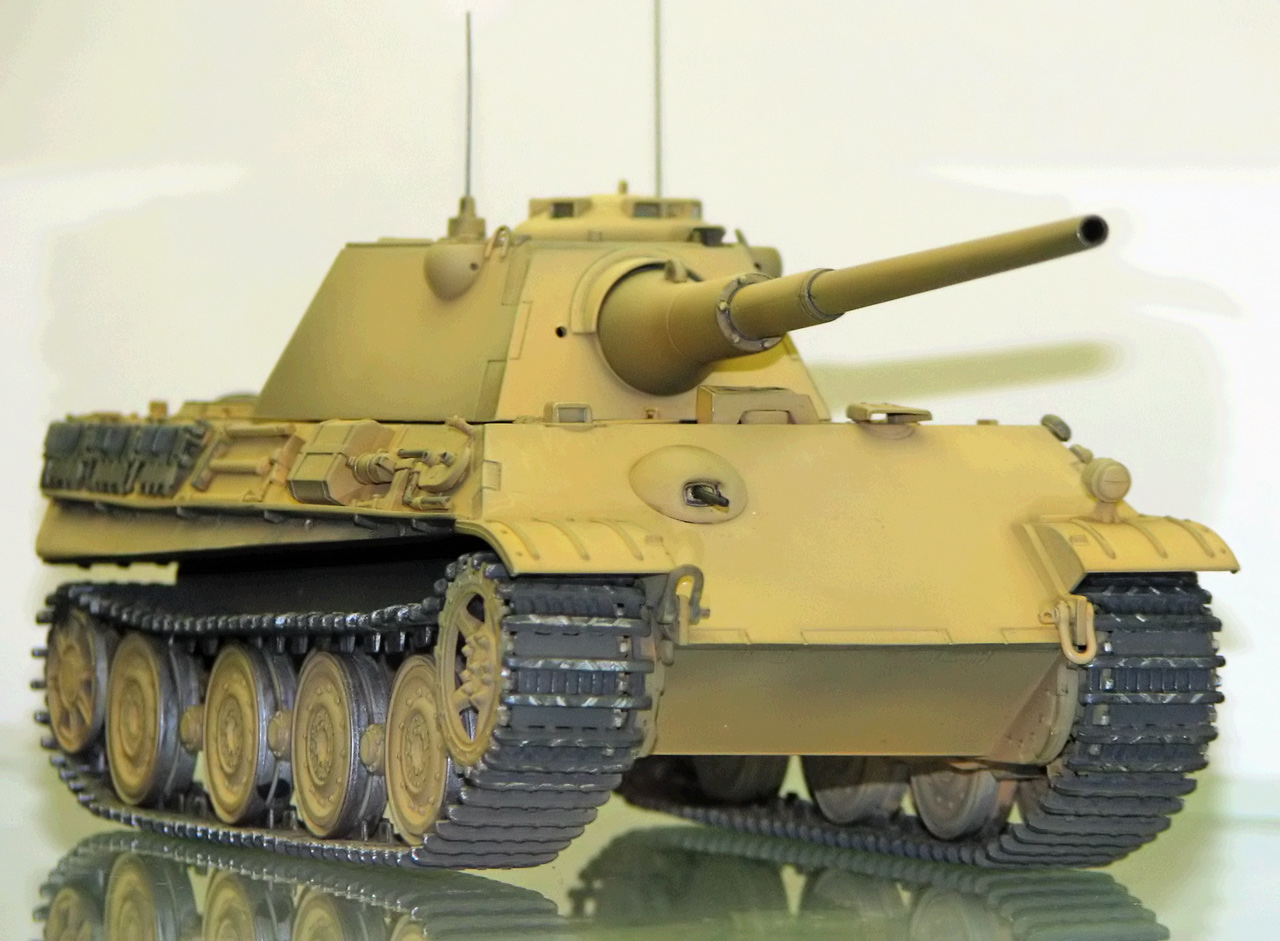
Scale model of prototype Schmalturm turret on Panther F

The Schmalturm (German for "narrow turret") was a tank turret designed for use on the Panther Ausf. F medium tank. There was a Krupp proposal to fit it onto the Panzer IV medium tank as well. It featured a narrow front to maximize protection while minimizing weight. It was both lighter and easier to manufacture than the standard Panther turret. The turret had a stereoscopic rangefinder with lenses on either side of the turret, located in spherical bulges. No Schmalturms entered series production.

== History ==
=== Rheinmetall concept ===
The Schmalturm was initially conceived by German arms manufacturer and designer Rheinmetall during their tasking for designing the turret of the Panther II. The new turret design was named Panther 2 Turm mit schmale Blendenausführung (meaning "turret with narrow mantlet"). However, the Panther II project was cancelled in May of 1943 so Rheinmetall switched the design for the original Panther tanks. By 1944, very little progress had been made on the design, with it not progressing beyond the drawing board. It was at this time that additional requirements were made for the turret design due to beginning of design for the newest Panther version, the Ausf. F occurring. The new design necessitated for the inclusion of a rangefinder to be incorporated into the turret as well as the replacement of the gunner's sight with a roof periscope. The rangefinder resulted in a discernible lump on the roof the turret appearing. However little progress was made beyond this, resulting in the project being transferred by Waffen Prüfen 6 to Daimler-Benz in February 1944.

=== Daimler Benz design ===
Daimler Benz utilised little if not none from Rheinmetall's designs in their own designs for the Schmalturm. The company progressed significantly faster than Rheinmetall in designing and producing a Schmalturm and by 20 August 1944, a fully functional Schmalturm was mated to a Panther Ausf. G hull. The designs never made it to mass production, nor did the Panther F.

=== Postwar ===
After the war, the Allies retrieved two prototypes of Daimler Benz's designs with the Americans seizing one and the British taking the other, using it in ballistic testing. This prototype turret is now found in the Bovington tank museum.

== Characteristics ==
The Schmalturm design featured several design requirements with the main concerns being the removal the shot trap found in the Panther's mantlet due to its cylindrical shape, an increase in turret protection while limiting weight, decreasing the size of the turret while still maintaining crew efficiency, as well as taking 30 percent less time to manufacture than the standard Panther turret. The addition of a stereoscopic rangefinder and making the turret easier and less expensive to produce compared to the Panther's turret. The end result of Daimler Benz's design resulted in a hexagonal-shaped turret which featured heavier armour on the turret as a whole. The front plate of the turret was 120 mm thick while the mantlet was a conical shape that was 150 mm thick angled to an extreme to ricochet any shells that hit it. The turret sides were upgraded to 60 mm, an improvement over the Panther's original 45 mm. The stereoscopic rangefinder of the Schmalturm could be identified through a bulb mounted to both sides of the turret. The 7.5 cm KwK 42 was equipped to the turret with a shorter recoil system to fit better in the smaller turret, allowing the gun to maintain a +20/-8 degrees of elevation/depression, leading to the new gun being designated KwK 44/1.

== Bibliography ==
- Jentz, Thomas L. (2001). Panzer Tracts No. 20-1 Panzerkampfwagen, Sturmgeschuetz, and Jagdpanzer. Panzer Tracts. ISBN 978-0970840738.
- Jentz, Thomas L. (2006). Panzer Tracts No. 5-4 Panzerkampfwagen Panther II and Panther Ausf. F. Panzer Tracts. ISBN 978-0977164325.
- Spielberger, Walter J. (1997). Panzer IV & Its Variants (The Spielberger German Armor & Military Vehicles, Vol. IV). Schiffer. ISBN 978-0887405150.
