= HMS Graph =

German World War II submarine

- HMS Graph in 1943

History

Nazi Germany
- Name: U-570
- Ordered: 24 October 1939
- Builder: Blohm & Voss, Hamburg
- Yard number: 546
- Laid down: 21 May 1940
- Launched: 20 March 1941
- Commissioned: 15 May 1941
- Captured: Captured by the Royal Navy on 27 August 1941

United Kingdom
- Name: HMS Graph
- Namesake: Graph
- Acquired: 27 August 1941
- Commissioned: 5 October 1941
- Decommissioned: 21 June 1943
- Fate: Ran aground on 20 March 1944; Scrapped in 1961

General characteristics
- Class & type: Type VIIC submarine
- Displacement: 769 tonnes (757 long tons) surfaced; 871 t (857 long tons) submerged
- Length: 67.10 m (220 ft 2 in)
- Beam: 6.20 m (20 ft 4 in)
- Draught: 4.74 m (15 ft 7 in)
- Propulsion: Two Blohm and Voss Diesel engines, 1,440 metric horsepower (1,060 kW; 1,420 shp; 1,060 kW) each; One 465 kW electric motor and one 276 kW electric motor
- Speed: 17.7 knots (32.8 km/h; 20.4 mph) surfaced; 7.6 knots (14.1 km/h; 8.7 mph) submerged
- Range: 8,500 nmi (15,700 km; 9,800 mi)
- Test depth: 230 m (750 ft)
- Armament: 5 × 53.3 cm (21 in) torpedo tubes (four bow, one stern); 14 × torpedoes or 26 TMA mines; 1 × 8.8 cm (3.46 in) deck gun (220 rounds); various AA guns

Service record (Kriegsmarine)
- Part of: 3rd U-boat Flotilla; 15 May – 27 August 1941
- Identification codes: M 42 381
- Commanders: Kptlt. Hans-Joachim Rahmlow; 15 May – 27 August 1941
- Operations: 1 patrol: 23 – 29 August 1941
- Victories: None

Service record (Royal Navy)
- Commanders: Lt. George Robson Colvin; 31 August – 10 October 1941; Lt. Edward Dudley Norman; 10 October 1941 – 1 June 1942; Lt. Peter Barnsley Marriott; 1 June 1942 – 2 April 1943; Lt. David Swanston; 3 April – 21 June 1943

HMS Graph (pennant number P715) was a German Type VIIC U-boat captured and recommissioned by the British Royal Navy during World War II.

Commissioned as U-570 in Nazi Germany's Kriegsmarine in mid-1941, she was attacked and captured on her first patrol. She provided the Royal Navy and United States Navy with useful information about German submarines. Refitted for use by the Allies, she carried out three combat patrols with a Royal Navy crew, becoming the only U-boat to see active service with both sides during the war. She was withdrawn from service in 1944 due to problems maintaining her. While being towed to the breakers for scrapping, she ran aground on the Isle of Islay, off the west coast of Scotland. Some of the wreckage was removed as scrap but some remains to the present day.

== Design and construction ==
The submarine was built to the German Type VIIC design. She had a displacement of 769 tonnes (757 long tons) when surfaced, and 871 t (857 long tons) when submerged. The boat was 67.10 metres (220 ft 2 in) long, with a beam of 6.2 metres (20 ft 4 in), and a draught of 4.74 metres (15 ft 7 in). The diesel-electric propulsion system provided a maximum speed of 18.8 knots (34.8 km/h; 21.6 mph) surfaced or 7.6 knots (14.1 km/h; 8.7 mph) submerged. The U-570 had a fuel capacity of 109 long tons (111 t) which gave a range of 7,500 nmi (13,900 km; 8,600 mi) at 10 knots (19 km/h; 12 mph). The test depth of the submarine was 230 metres (750 ft).

Her main armament consisted of five 53.3-cm (21-inch) torpedo tubes; four in the bow, and a fifth in the stern. She could carry a total of 14 torpedoes – five in the torpedo tubes, seven reloads inside the pressure hull, and a further two in water-tight canisters outside the pressure hull. The boat was fitted with an 8.8-cm C/35 deck gun (with around 150 rounds of ammunition), and a 2-cm Flak 30 anti-aircraft gun with a 28-cm stereoscopic rangefinder. She also carried several machine guns.

Blohm & Voss laid down U-570 at Hamburg on 21 May 1940. The submarine was launched on 20 March 1941.

== Kriegsmarine service ==
U-570 was commissioned into the Kriegsmarine on 15 May 1941. After a series of short testing and commissioning trips in the Baltic, she moved to Norway where she carried out short training voyages and fired practice torpedoes. By 25 July, she had moved to the German U-boat base at Lofjord, part of Trondheimsfjord, around 13 kilometres (7 nmi) north of Trondheim.

In late August 1941, B-Dienst (the German naval codebreaking organisation) became aware of a large concentration of Allied merchant ships in the region of the North Atlantic south of Iceland. Admiral Karl Dönitz ordered 16 U-boats to the area. U-570 was to be one of these and, on the morning of 24 August, she put to sea on her first war patrol. Her planned mission was to patrol the area south of Iceland before proceeding to the U-boat base at La Pallice, France. She carried provisions for four weeks at sea.

Kapitänleutnant Hans-Joachim Rahmlow commanded U-570. He was an experienced naval officer, but had only recently transferred to U-boats, having previously been a gunnery and coastal defence specialist. He had commanded the training submarine U-58, but had carried out no war patrols. Likewise, the First Watch Officer (second-in-command) had only served a few months with the U-boat branch, after serving on destroyers, and the Second Watch Officer had little experience, having only recently been commissioned. The engineer was the only officer (and one of only four crewmen) who had served on a U-boat war patrol. While the boat's petty officers had several years of navy service, many of the enlisted crew were still new to the German navy and had only a few months of U-boat training.

U-570's inexperienced crew was not unique for the time. British interrogation of rescued crew-members of U-501—sunk on her first patrol in September 1941—revealed that 41 out of 48 crew were on their first war patrol.

== Capture ==
Location of the capture, south of Iceland

On 27 August 1941, U-570 spent much of the morning submerged. She had been four days at sea and this was to give respite to a crew that was suffering acutely from seasickness (several had been incapacitated). Earlier that morning, a Lockheed Hudson bomber of 269 Squadron, RAF, flown by Sergeant Mitchell and operating from Kaldaðarnes, Iceland, had attacked her. The attack failed when the Hudson's bomb-racks failed to release its depth charges. U-570 surfaced at position 62°15′N 18°35′W at around 10:50 am, immediately below a second 269 Squadron Hudson, flown by Squadron Leader James Thompson. Thompson was patrolling the area after Mitchell summoned him by radio. Rahmlow, who had climbed out onto the bridge, heard the approaching Hudson's engines and ordered a crash-dive. Thompson's aircraft reached U-570 before she was fully submerged and dropped its four 250-pound (110 kg) depth charges—one detonated just 10 yards (10 m) from the boat.

U-570 quickly resurfaced and around 10 of the crew emerged. The Hudson fired on them with machine guns, but ceased when the U-boat crew displayed a white sheet. The captured crew members later recounted to British naval intelligence interrogators what had happened—the depth charge explosions had almost rolled the boat over, knocked out all electrical power, smashed instruments, caused water leaks, and contaminated the air on the boat. The inexperienced crew believed the contamination to be chlorine, caused by acid from leaking battery cells mixing with sea-water, and the engine-compartment crew panicked and fled forward to escape the gas. Restoring electrical power—for the underwater electric motors and for lighting—would have been straightforward, yet there was nobody remaining in the engine compartment to do this. The submarine was dead in the water and in darkness. Rahmlow believed the chlorine would make it fatal to stay submerged so he resurfaced. The sea was too rough for the crew to man their anti-aircraft gun so they displayed a white flag to forestall another, probably fatal, depth charge attack from the Hudson—they were unaware the aircraft had dropped all its depth charges.

Most of the crew remained on the deck of the submarine as Thompson circled above them, his aircraft now joined by a second Hudson that had been en route from Scotland to Iceland and had broken off its journey to lend assistance. (Note: The Imperial War Museum's collection includes a recorded interview of former RAF Flying Officer Hugh Eccles, who was one of the crew of this aircraft.) A radio request for help saw a Consolidated Catalina flying boat of 209 Squadron (Note: The aircraft was Catalina number AH553, flown by Flying Officer Edward Jewiss; see; Conyers Nesbit (2008), p.74. Jewiss had been partially responsible for sinking the U-452 two days earlier. See: Blair (1996), p.342.) being scrambled at Reykjavík; it reached the scene three hours later. The German crew radioed their situation to the German naval high-command, destroyed their radio, smashed their Enigma machine, and dumped its parts overboard along with the boat's secret papers. Admiral Dönitz later noted in his war diary that he ordered U-boats in the area to go to U-570's assistance after receiving this report; U-82 responded, but Allied air patrols prevented U-82 from reaching U-570.

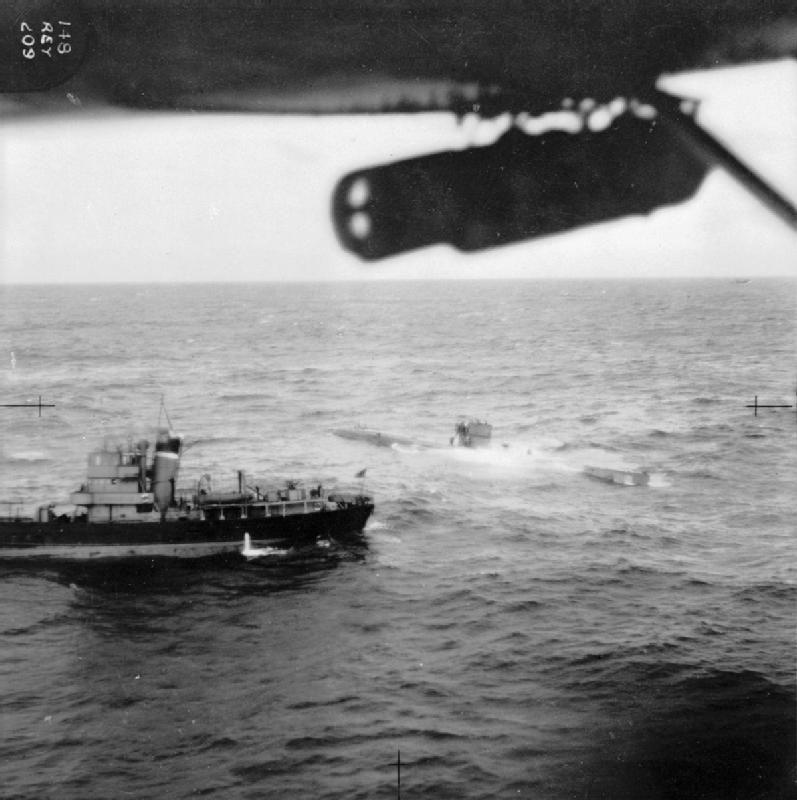
U-570 with one of the Royal Navy trawlers, photographed from an RAF Catalina

U-570's transmission was in plain language and the British intercepted it. Admiral Percy Noble, commander of Western Approaches Command, immediately ordered several ships to race to the scene. By early afternoon, fuel levels had forced the Hudsons to return to Iceland. (Note: Upon his return to Kaldaðarnes, Thompson wrote off his Hudson in a landing accident, but without serious injury to any on board.) The Catalina, a very long-range aircraft, was ordered to watch the submarine until Allied ships arrived. If none came before sunset, the aircraft was to warn U-570's crew to take to the water, then sink her. The first vessel to reach U-570, the anti-submarine trawler HMT Northern Chief, arrived around 10:00 pm, guided to the scene by flares the Catalina dropped. The Catalina returned to Iceland after having circled U-570 for 13 hours.

The German crew remained on board U-570 overnight; they made no attempt to scuttle their boat as Northern Chief had signalled she would open fire and not rescue survivors from the water if they did this. (Northern Chief's captain, N.L. Knight, had been ordered to prevent the submarine from being scuttled by any means.) During the night, five more Allied vessels reached the scene: the armed trawler Kingston Agate, two anti-submarine whalers, (Note: The lake-class armed whalers HMS Wastwater and HMS Windermere) the Royal Navy destroyer HMS Burwell, and the Canadian destroyer HMCS Niagara.

At daybreak, the Allies and Germans exchanged signal lamp messages, with the Germans repeatedly requesting to be taken off as they were unable to stay afloat, and the British refusing to evacuate them until the Germans secured the submarine and stopped it from sinking—the British were concerned that the Germans would deliberately leave behind them a sinking U-boat if they were evacuated. The situation became more confused when a small float-plane appeared: a Northrop N-3PB of 330 (Norwegian) Squadron). Unaware of the surrender, it attacked U-570 with small bombs and fired on Northern Chief, which fired back. No damage was done and Burwell ordered the aircraft away by radio.

The weather worsened; several attempts to attach a tow-line to U-570 were unsuccessful. Believing the Germans were being obstructive, Burwell's captain, S.R.J. Woods ordered a machine gunner to fire warning shots, shots that accidentally hit and slightly wounded five of the German crew. With much difficulty, an officer (Note: Lieutenant H.B. Campbell, see Conyers Nesbit 2008, p.75, Blair 1996, p. 344) and three sailors from Kingston Agate reached the submarine using a Carley float (a liferaft). After a quick search failed to find the U-boat's Enigma machine, they attached a tow line and transferred the five wounded men and the submarine's officers to Kingston Agate. The remaining crew were taken on board HMCS Niagara, which by this time had come alongside U-570.

The ships began slowly sailing to Iceland with U-570 under tow, and with a relay of Hudsons and Catalinas constantly patrolling overhead. They arrived at dawn on 29 August at Þorlákshöfn. There, they beached U-570 as she had been taking on water and was thought to be in danger of sinking.

=== Salvage and repair ===
Two days after U-570's arrival, a British submarine commander—Lieutenant George Robson Colvin—together with a team of engineering warrant officers and civilian technical experts, arrived at Þorlákshöfn from Britain. They then carried out the initial examination and salvage of U-570.

The submarine was then lying broadside on to the surf and listing heavily to starboard... The interior of the submarine was unlit and was in a chaotic state; leaks of oil and water from the broken gauge glasses of internal tanks had combined with vast quantities of provisions, flour, dried peas and beans, soft fruit, clothes, bedding, and the remains of scores of loaves of black bread to form a revolting morass that in places was knee-deep. It was subsequently discovered that in this ship the crew's W.C. had been converted into a food locker and overturned buckets of excrement added to the general noisome conditions.

— Lieutenant GR Colvin, RN, Ex-German Submarine "U 570" – Report of Proceedings (3 October 1941)

Colvin's team was able to restore lighting and buoyancy; a refloated U-570 was towed around the coast to the British naval base at Hvalfjörður. There U-570 was docked to the depot ship HMS Hecla for repair, with the aim that U-570 could make the trip to Britain under her own power.

The British discovered that the depth charge damage to the U-boat was not critical—there were leaks in some of the ballast tanks and a small leak in a fuel tank. Around one third of the battery cells were cracked and the bow had been buckled. Water had leaked in through a valve that had been unseated by the explosions and through glass gauges that had broken; other damage was minor and no evidence of chlorine gas found. In his report, Colvin stated his opinion that there was no evidence of any damage control being carried out and that an experienced submarine crew would have been easily able to improvise repairs, stay submerged and likely evade the air-attack. After their surrender, the German crew had attempted to destroy instruments and fittings, but, with the exception of the wrecked radio and the damaged torpedo firing computer, the attempt appeared half-hearted and the damage was not significant. Also, useful papers had missed destruction. Copies of encrypted signals and their corresponding, plain-language, German texts were found—material of use to the British Enigma code breaking effort. A significant discovery was the U-boat commander's handbook, which provided context and background information for decrypted messages. The British, unfamiliar with German naval procedures, abbreviations and jargon, had often found German naval traffic hard to understand even when decrypted.

U-570 spent three weeks at Hvalfjörður, being repaired and taking short sea trials to test the engines and steering. Between 23 and 26 September, she was carefully inspected by two US Navy officers who had been sent from the United Kingdom to Iceland for that purpose; one of the submarine's G7a torpedoes was off-loaded, handed over to the Americans, and later sent to the United States. An eyewitness recalled that at one point, a Hudson bomber flew low over U-570 and HMS Hecla, signalling with a Morse lamp, "This ****** is mine."

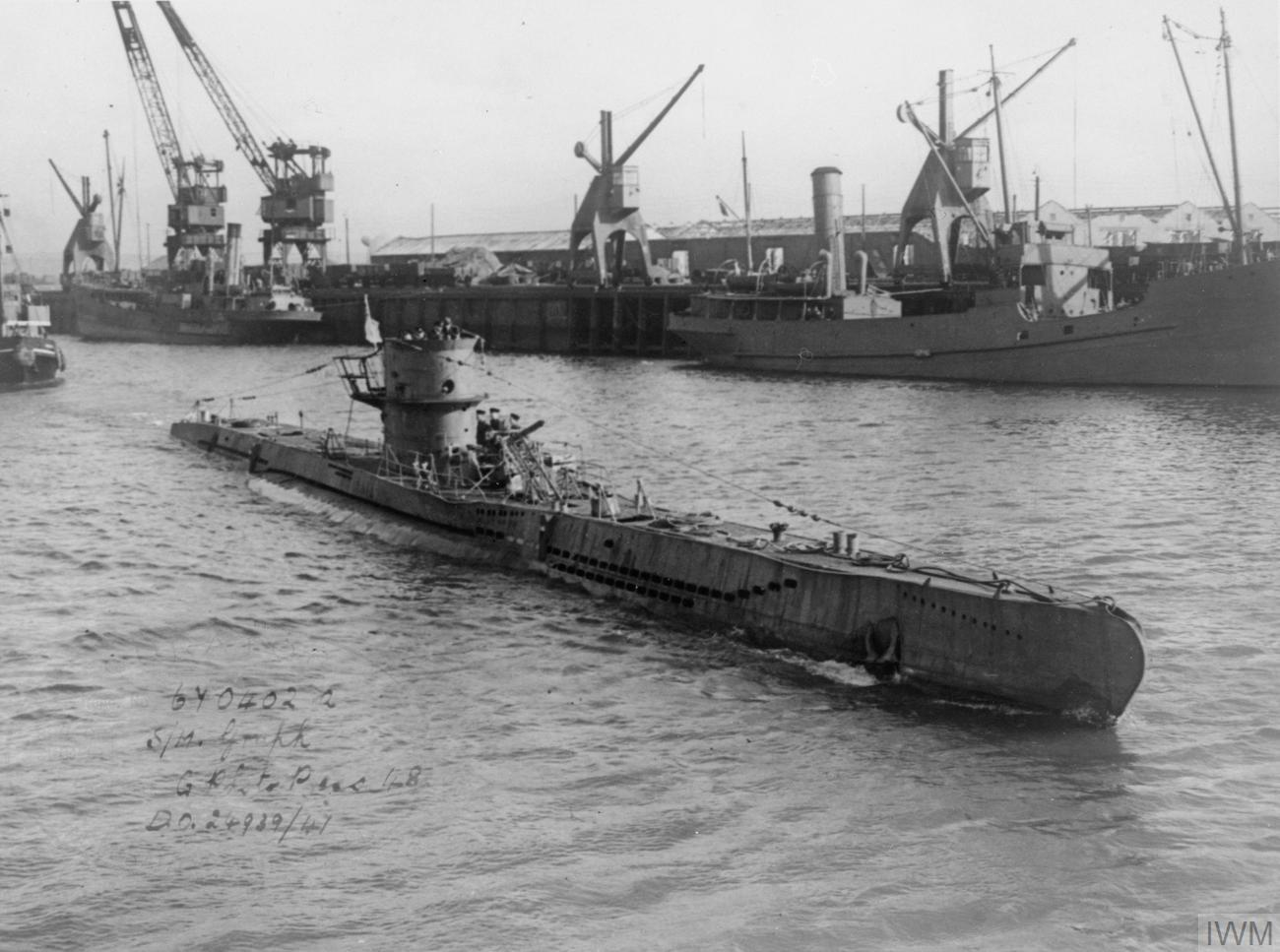
The U-570 arrives at Barrow-in-Furness, 3 October 1941

On 29 September, the submarine set out for the UK, manned by a Royal Navy prize crew under the command of Lieutenant Colvin. Escorted by the S class destroyer HMS Saladin and HMS Kingston Agate, she sailed on the surface as her diving planes had been damaged by the beaching at Þorlákshöfn. Her arrival at Barrow-in-Furness on 3 October was filmed by Pathé News newsreel cameras, and reported in the press. The capture would later be featured in British propaganda. The capture of several other U-boats, such as the U-110, which had sunk whilst under tow, was kept secret to conceal the seizure of their code-books and Enigma machines. U-570's situation had been reported to the German high command. Also, so many ships, aircraft, and personnel had been involved in her capture that any attempt at secrecy would have been futile.

U-570 was placed in a dry-dock in the Vickers shipyard in Barrow. Her repair was complicated by depth-charge damage to her bow—her plating had been buckled, trapping four electrically powered torpedoes in their torpedo tubes. Two officers from the Royal Navy's Department of Torpedoes and Mines Investigations had the task of retrieving them for examination. The dock was evacuated while a volunteer shipyard worker cut the armed torpedoes free with an oxyacetylene cutter under the officers' supervision. One of the officers—Lt Martin Johnson—then removed the magnetic pistols (detonators) from the torpedoes and made them safe—a dangerous task as the pistols were sensitive mechanisms and large enough to produce a lethal explosion on their own. For this act he was awarded the George Medal on 8 December 1942.

Squadron Leader Thompson, his navigator/bomb-aimer—Flying Officer John Coleman, and Flying Officer Edward Jewiss (the pilot of the 209 Squadron Catalina), all received the Distinguished Flying Cross on 23 September 1941. The captain of Kingston Agate, Henry L'Estrange, was awarded the Distinguished Service Cross for his part in the capture.

=== German response ===
Initially, all the German naval high command knew of U-570's situation was her radio message, saying she was under air-attack and unable to submerge; they only learned of her capture from later British press reports. They were concerned for the security of their communications and Vizeadmiral Erhard Maertens, the Director of the Naval Intelligence Command, was ordered to report on this. He concluded that in the worst-case scenario—that is, the British had secured U-570's codebooks and Rahmlow had revealed to them his memorised, secret keyword—communications would be compromised until a new list of Enigma machine settings came into force in November. However, he believed this worst case to be unlikely and that U-570's crew would have almost certainly destroyed their secret material. Even if they had not, the additional security of the commander's secret keyword would defeat British cryptanalysis.

In fact, the British code-breakers at Bletchley Park found the extra security of the keyword procedure to be simply of "nuisance value". U-570's crew had indeed destroyed their Enigma machine and code-books but the Germans were unaware of the Royal Navy's earlier capture of U-110's secret material, thanks to which the British had been breaking German naval cyphers since June 1941. British code-breaking was not seriously impeded until February 1942, when a new naval Enigma cypher remained unbroken for 10 months—the so-called "Shark Blackout".

Apart from Rahmlow, U-570's officers were taken to an officers' prisoner-of-war camp at Grizedale Hall in Cumbria. This was nicknamed U-boat Hotel by the British as, during the early part of the war, the majority of prisoners were naval officers rescued from sunken U-boats. There, a "Court of Honour" convened by other German prisoners, including captured U-boat ace Otto Kretschmer, tried Rahmlow, in absentia, and U-570's other officers. Rahmlow and his second-in-command, Bernhard Berndt, were found "guilty of cowardice"; the other two officers were "acquitted". On the night of 18/19 October, Berndt escaped from the camp. A detachment of the Home Guard apprehended him, shooting him when he tried to escape.

According to some sources, he had escaped from the camp with the stated intention of redeeming himself by making his way to U-570's dockyard at Barrow–a distance of only 22 miles (35 km)–and somehow destroying her. Another source states he was forced to make an escape attempt by a group of senior German prisoners who enforced a brutal regime of punishing those who held anti-Nazi views or who co-operated with the British, and that Berndt only broke away and ran from the Home Guard when he realised they were returning him to Grizedale Hall; they shot him dead after he ignored warning shots. The British placed Rahmlow in a camp with German Army and Air Force prisoners to avoid further incidents of this kind. (Note: These events may have formed the basis for the 1970 film The McKenzie Break, in which a German PoW, played by Horst Janson, is victimised by his fellow prisoners in a Scottish PoW camp, while others escape and are subsequently recaptured.)

The German high command recognised U-570's loss could be partially blamed on the crew's lack of training and experience (during the early part of the war, U-boat training had been cut down to two months). Both this and mounting U-boat losses, including many boats sunk on their first patrol, prompted the Germans to put more resources into training. Also, the Germans broke up existing veteran crews and dispersed the men amongst the U-boat fleet, so the crews of all newly commissioned boats would include a core of experienced, long-serving crewmen.

Months later, the German command was still trying to discover the fate of U-570's codebooks. A system of coded messages, hidden in the text of apparently ordinary, personal letters, was used to order Otto Kretschmer to report on this. They were unaware that the Allies had discovered this channel of communication with German prisoners.

== Royal Navy service ==
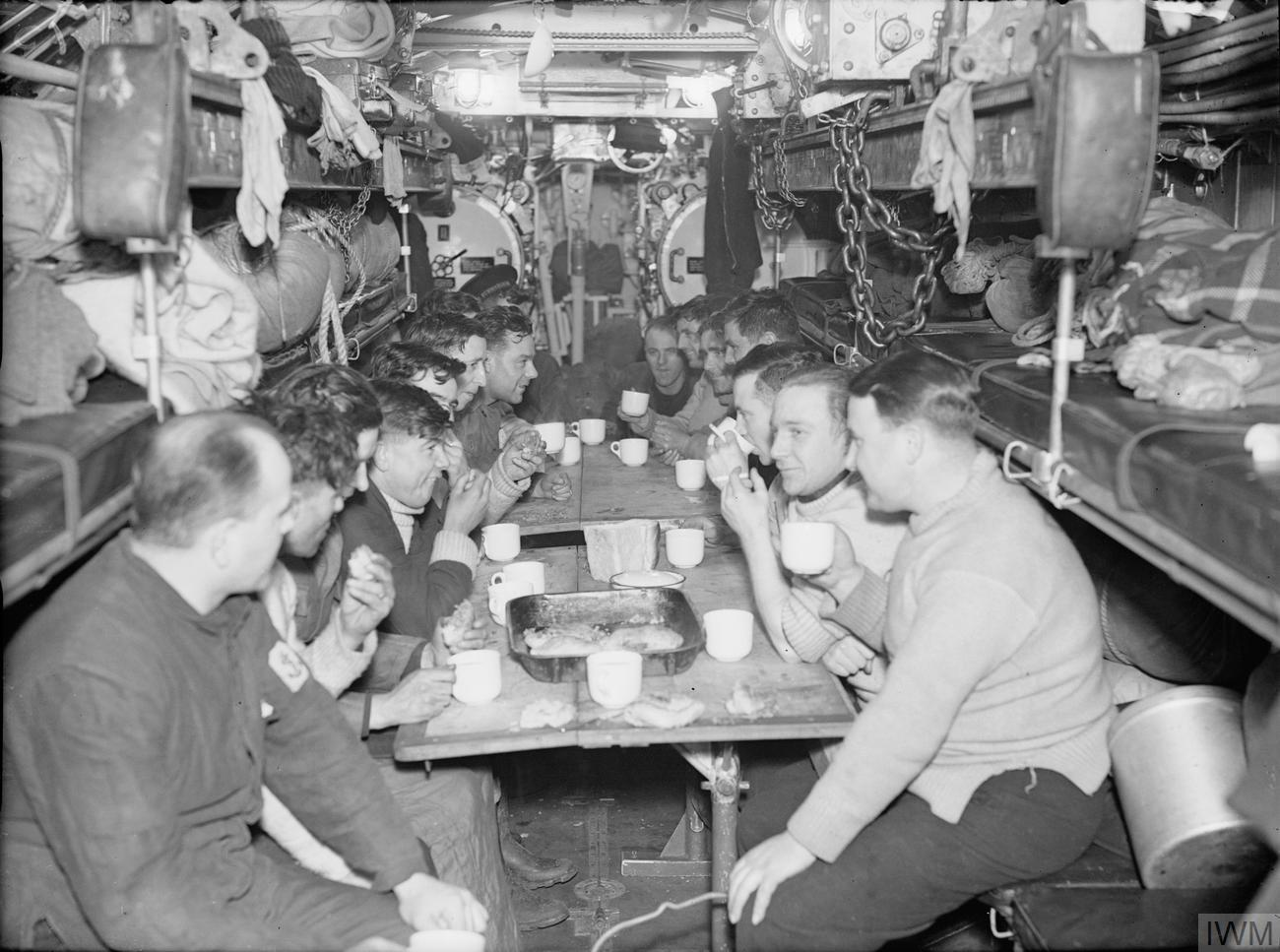
Some of the Royal Navy crew of Graph having supper in the forward torpedo room during sea-trials, February 1942

The disposition of U-570 was initially uncertain. Winston Churchill was in favour of handing her over to the Americans for repair, both for propaganda and as a means of deepening then-neutral America's engagement in the Battle of the Atlantic. The Americans were eager to have her, but the Royal Navy objected both to this and to Churchill's other idea – to have her serve in the Mediterranean with a Yugoslav crew. Instead, she was commissioned into the Royal Navy as HMS Graph on 5 October 1941, and assigned the Royal Navy pennant number P715. She was given a name beginning with a 'G' to signify German, i.e., denoting that Graph was a captured vessel. The name Graph was also chosen owing to the extensive testing carried out on her (and therefore the many "Graphs" drawn up), but was also a play on the German word Graf meaning "Count".

=== Trials ===
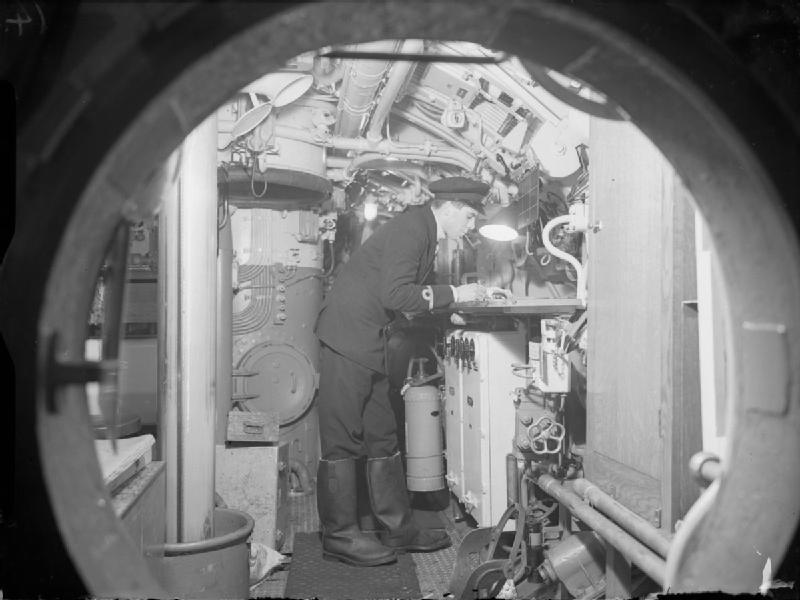
A Royal Navy Sub-Lieutenant works at the chart-table in the control room of Graph, February 1942

Once seaworthy, trials were conducted to measure the aspects of Graph's sailing and diving characteristics. Even the Zeiss binoculars found on board were tested.

Graph's safe diving depth was discovered to be 230 metres (750 ft)—much deeper than the British thought for this kind of boat. At the time, Royal Navy depth charges had a maximum depth setting of 170 metres (560 ft) so the Germans could dive out of their reach. Depth charges were soon modified to take account of this. The boat's acoustic and magnetic characteristics were examined by different Admiralty research establishments.

The Allied technical experts found much to praise about her design and construction. Graph's auxiliary machinery was on rubber mountings, making her stealthier by reducing sound transmission into the hull. The British and the Americans who examined Graph singled out her Zeiss periscope for particular praise. The American officers who carried out her initial inspection in Iceland recommended it be copied as quickly as possible for possible US Navy use. Her underwater acoustic equipment was found to be a sophisticated array of hydrophones that was significantly better than the British equivalents. The main criticism of the boat was poor and cramped crew accommodation, which would degrade crew performance on long patrols.

In mid-1942, Graph was carefully studied by the US Navy, which then had an interest in a new, smaller submarine that would be roughly her size – around two-thirds the length and half the displacement of the Gato-class boats that formed the bulk of the US submarine fleet. She was considered superior in many ways to the two experimental Mackerel-class, the existing class of small US submarine, but the project was dropped.

Full-scale models of her pressure hull were constructed, and used during mid-1942 for underwater tests of experimental shaped charge anti-submarine bombs. In a highly secret British project, Graph was also used as a model for the construction of three, full-sized, mock-ups of the control compartment, wardroom and radio room of a Type VII U-boat. These were used to train specialist groups of sailors, who would form boarding parties whenever a damaged U-boat was blown to the surface. They were trained to operate a U-boat's ballast-tank valves, to reverse any scuttling attempts by the crew, and to search quickly for cryptographic equipment and documents.

=== Active service ===
After completing trials under the command of Lieutenant Commander E.D. Norman, Graph was placed under the command of Lieutenant Peter Barnsley Marriott, who had assisted in the trials. She departed from Holy Loch for her first Royal Navy war patrol on 8 October 1942, with the intention of patrolling the Bay of Biscay.

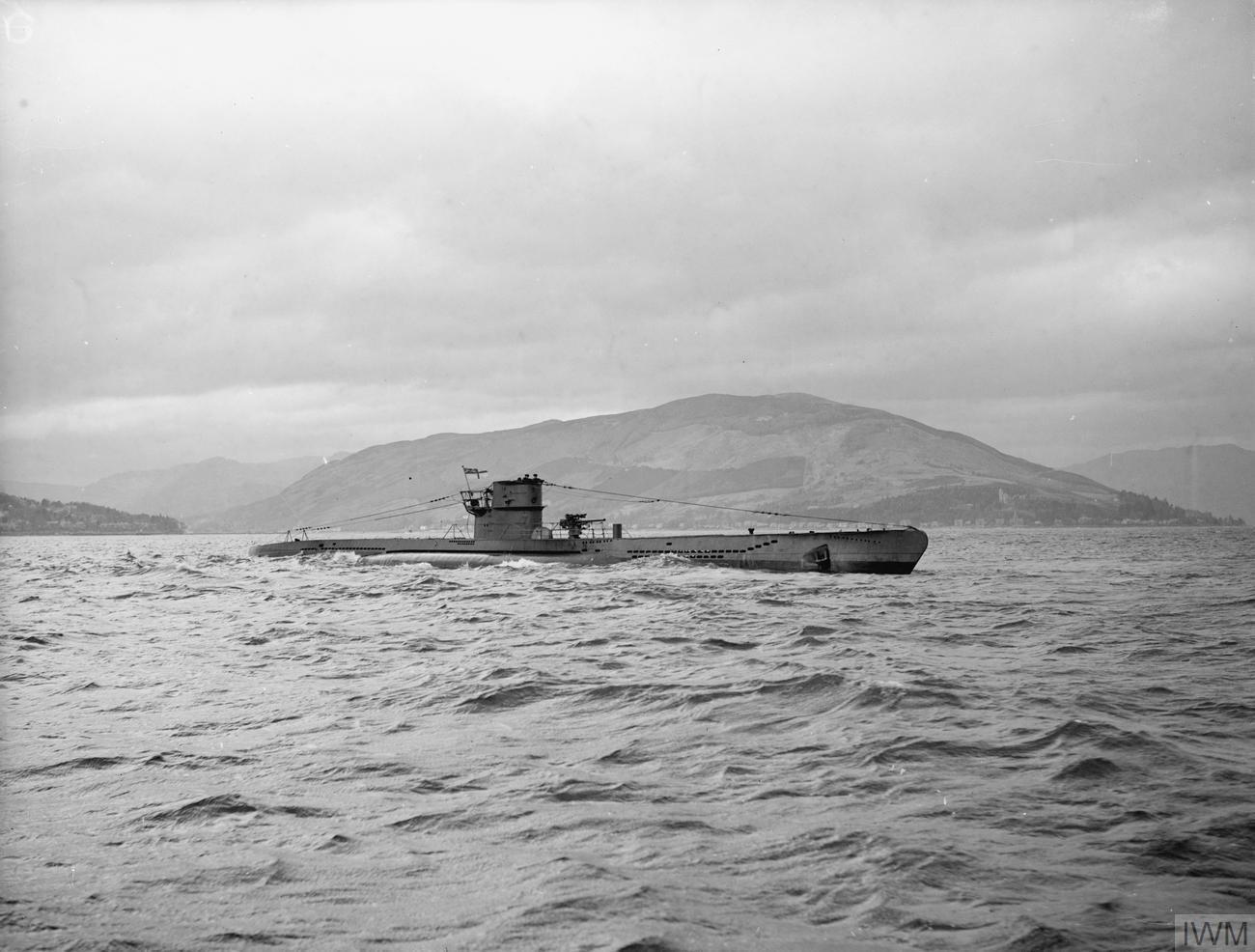
Graph at Holy Loch, Scotland, after she had ceased active service and been reassigned for training use (20 April 1943)

On the afternoon of 21 October 1942, about 50 nautical miles (90 km; 60 mi) north-north-east of Cape Ortegal (44°31′N 7°25′W), Graph dived to evade a German Focke-Wulf Fw 200 long-range patrol aircraft. A loud hydrophone contact made Marriott believe a nearby submarine had likewise dived and, 12 minutes later, he observed its conning-tower against the setting sun. After pursuing the German boat, Graph fired four torpedoes. Explosions were heard, and also banging noises, leading the British to believe they had hit the other submarine and the banging noises were caused by her breaking up as she sank. In early 1943, Marriott was awarded the Distinguished Service Order for "great courage, skill and determination in a successful submarine patrol".

After the war, examination of German records showed the submarine attacked was the U-333, badly damaged after being rammed by the Flower-class corvette HMS Crocus off the coast of West Africa. German lookouts had seen the torpedoes' tracks, enabling U-333 to evade the torpedoes; the torpedoes then self-detonated for unknown reasons. The commander of U-333 was Peter-Erich Cremer. In his post-war account of the attack, he suggested the rattling and banging noises Graph's crew had heard were due to the severe damage previously inflicted on U-333. His route back to France closely hugged the Spanish coastline, a pattern followed by other U-boats, and he had also believed that Marriott was aware of this and had been lying in wait.

Graph's second war patrol was from 19 November 1942 to 8 December 1942, also in the Bay of Biscay. During the patrol, she was ordered to intercept the Italian cargo ship Cortellazzo, which was passing through the area en route from Bordeaux to Japan with a cargo of 2000 tons of machinery. However, Graph failed to find the ship and the patrol was without incident. Cortellazzo was sunk within days by HMS Redoubt, one of the destroyer escorts of an Allied troop convoy, after Redoubt had ordered Cortellazzo's crew to abandon ship and had picked them up.

Graph departed from Lerwick on her third war patrol on 24 December 1942 with three other Royal Navy submarines; their task was to patrol the waters off the coast of Norway in the area of Altafjord. At 1 am on 1 January 1943, at the position 70°51′N 21°56′E, she sighted the German heavy cruiser Admiral Hipper, returning from the unsuccessful attack on convoy JW 51B, better known as the Battle of the Barents Sea. Hipper was too far off and travelling too fast to be attacked. At 4:23 am, Graph sighted two German destroyers moving erratically and at low speed. (Note: Six German destroyers took part in the Battle of the Barents Sea; one was sunk.) Graph closed to a range of 7,000 yards (6,400 m) and fired four torpedoes. Again, explosions convinced the British that hits had been scored and a destroyer probably sunk, but again all the shots had missed. Graph returned to Lerwick on 13 January 1943.

Graph undertook no further war patrols. In 1943, she was assigned for training duties and command of her passed to Lt. D. Swanston. Peter Marriott went on to command HMS Stoic, where he was awarded a DSC. (Note: After the war ended, Marriott commanded a second U-boat, the surrendered U-776, during a lengthy tour of British ports, when she was displayed to the public in order to raise money for the King George's Fund for Sailors.)

=== Decommissioning ===
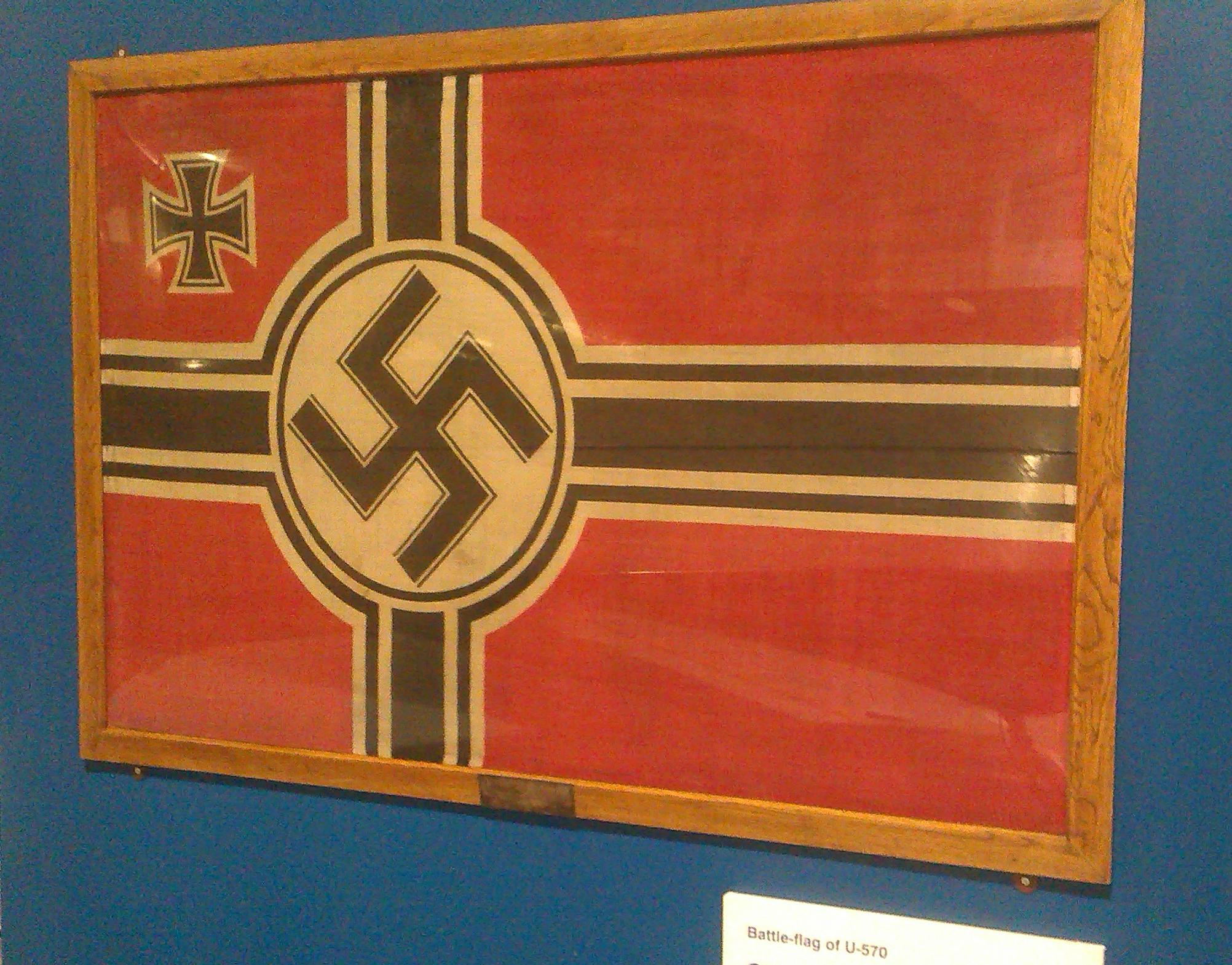
U 570's Reichskriegsflagge or war ensign, displayed in the Royal Air Force Museum London, 2023

Defects, exacerbated by a shortage of spare parts, led to Graph being placed in reserve. Also, her batteries and her MAN diesel engines had a comparatively short service life; German submarine batteries required annual replacement, unlike British batteries, which were intended to last for the lifetime of the boat.

She was decommissioned from active service on 21 June 1943. She saw some use as a target, to determine the damage caused by depth charges in full-scale trials. After surviving these experiments, she was to be towed by the Royal Navy rescue tug HMRT Growler from Chatham to the Clyde for scrapping. But on 20 March 1944 her tow–rope broke in gale-force winds and, driven by wind and waves, she ran aground at a position 55°48′06″N 6°28′30″W, near Coul Point, on the west coast of Islay, Scotland. Growler was unable to re-float the submarine and she was abandoned.

Graph was partially salvaged and scrapped in 1961. In 1966, the salvage diver Keith Jessop and others removed some more of the wreck, without the permission of the owner of the wreck's salvage rights; they paid £400 in compensation to the owner, but were still prosecuted and fined £50. Some remains of HMS Graph still remained visible at low tide on the rocks near Saligo beach in 1970, with the pressure casing of the conning tower and periscope tube visible (the cladding, railings and other parts had all broken off in the Atlantic storms many years before). Today, the remains of the wreck lie in about 5 metres (20 ft) of water; the site has been visited and photographed by recreational divers.

One of the Kriegsmarine battle flags of U-570 was presented to Squadron Leader Thompson and is now part of the collection of the RAF Museum. Other surviving relics from the boat include her typewriter, held by the museum at Bletchley Park, a small celestial globe used for navigation, that is owned by a private collector, and a German sailor's cap, that was taken as a souvenir by one of the officers of HMCS Niagara and is in the Canadian War Museum. Another battle flag is claimed to have come into the possession of a young apprentice fitter at the Vickers Barrow shipyard and still survives. (Note: While it is quite possible the apprentice fitter was the volunteer who cut the torpedoes free and the flag was his reward, the sources do not explicitly confirm this.)

== See also ==
- List of submarines of the Second World War
- HMS Meteorite – Formerly, the experimental, German Type XVII submarine U-1407; used by the Royal Navy post-war.
- HMS Seal (N37) – Royal Navy submarine, captured and taken into service by the Germans.
- HM Submarine X2 – Italian submarine captured and taken into service by the Royal Navy.
- U-1105 – German Type VII-C/41 U-boat that was commissioned as the Royal Navy submarine N2 between 1945 and 1946.

== Bibliography ==
- "ADM 186/806—CB 4051 U 570, Interrogation of Crew", Intelligence Division Naval Staff, Admiralty. January 1941. Now in The National Archives and reproduced in full Archived 16 November 2016 at the Wayback Machine by uboatarchive.net
- ADM 239/358—CB 4318 Report on ex-German Submarine "U570" (HMS "Graph"), Intelligence Division Naval Staff, Admiralty, January 1943, archived from the original on 31 March 2017, "reproduced at uboatarchive.net"
- Blair, Clay (1996). Hitler's U-Boat War: The Hunters 1939–42. New York: Random House. ISBN 0-394-58839-8.
- Blair, Clay (1999). Hitler's U-Boat War: The Hunted 1942-45. Weidenfeld & Nicolson. ISBN 0-297-84077-0.
- Conyers Nesbit, Roy (2008). Ultra Versus U-Boats: Enigma Decrypts in the National Archives. Pen & Sword Military. ISBN 978-1844158744.
- Cremer, Peter (1984). U333: Story of a U-boat Ace. The Bodley Head Ltd. ISBN 0-370-30545-0.
- Durham, Phil (1996). The Führer Led But We Overtook Him. Edinburgh: Pentland. ISBN 1-85821-365-7.: The memoir of a Royal Navy submariner who served on Graph
- Dunmore, Spencer (2001). In Great Waters: The Epic Story of the Battle of the Atlantic. Pimlico. ISBN 0-7126-6932-9.
- Lincoln, Ashe (1961). Secret Naval Investigator. London: William Kimber and Co Ltd.: See chapter VIII in which the author describes joining Lieutenant Martin Johnson at Barrow to work out how to access the torpedoes.
- Mulligan, Timothy (2011). Neither Sharks Nor Wolves. Naval Institute Press. ISBN 978-1591145462.
- "Report On The German Submarine U-570 Class Captured By The British in August 1941". United States Navy, reproduced by uboatarchive.net. 28 September 1941. Archived from the original on 14 November 2016.
- Peterson, John (9 April 2012). "From London to Lerwick: The final voyage of U-776". The Shetland Times. Archived from the original on 23 April 2025.
- Sebag-Montefiore, Hugh (2000). Enigma: The Battle for the Code. London: Weidenfeld & Nicolson. ISBN 0-297-84251-X.
- Terrell, Edward (1958). Admiralty Brief: the Story of Inventions that Contributed to Victory in the Battle of the Atlantic. London: Harrap. OCLC 504731245.
