= Georg Friedrich Brander =

German precision mechanic and mathematician

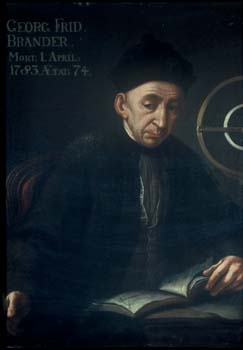
Georg Friedrich Brander

Georg Friedrich Brander (* 28. November 1713 in Regensburg; † 1. April 1783 in Augsburg) was an important maker of scientific instruments.

== Early years ==
Brander was born 1713 to Georg Brandner, an apothecary with roots in Nuremberg, and Sibylla Katharina Brandner (widowed Pfaffreuter, 1678–1756) from a Regensburg goldsmith family. He studied in Altdorf bei Nürnberg from 1731 to 1734 mathematics and physics under the supervision of Johann Gabriel Doppelmayr.

== Professional work ==
In 1734 he moved to Augsburg (Germany), where he founded a workshop for fine mechanics. He was supported by local financier Josef von Halder with capital and in establishing a business network. Brander was the first one in Germany to build a mirror telescope in 1737. Since 1754 the workshop has produced also microscopes, and the high-resolution micrometer glass rulers were its speciality. A telescope, coupled in 1776 with a map of the starry sky, is named "starfinder". In 1778 he invented the coincidence telemeter, a device used to measure distances to remote objects. In those years, surveying was an important task and Brander delivered a substantial number of optical instruments, e.g. sextant, goniometer, leveling instrument and a predecessor of today's theodolite.

He also published several writings on mechanics. He gave a precise description and manual with each of his instruments, which was unusual at that time.

Brander won moderate fame by building precision machines for many European courts and academies. A collection of his instruments can be found at Deutsches Museum, München. In today's Augsburg, a street bears his name (Branderstraße).

== Family life ==
He married Sabina Barbara Thennin ( 1754-02-14) and had a daughter Barbara Eurphrosina who married his business partner Christoph Caspar Hoeschel (1744-1820). After Brander's death, Hoeschel continued the fine mechanics business and could keep the high reputation for quality instruments. After Hoeschel died, his son took over and the workshop soon lost his relevance.

== Publications ==
- Brander, Georg Friedrich; Kratzenstein, Christian Gottlieb (1781-03-17). Georg Friedrich Branders, der churbayrischen Akademie der Wissenschaften Mitglied und Mechanikus in Augsburg, Beschreibung eines neuerfundenen Distanzmessers aus einer Station für Ingenieurs und Artilleristen, welche von der Königlich Dänischen Akademie der Wissenschaften im Jahre 1778 den Preiß erhalten. Mit Kupfern [Georg Friedrich Brander's, member of the Chur-Bavarian Academy of Science and Mechanicus in Augsburg, description of a newly invented rangefinder from a single station for engineers and artillerists, which received the price by the Royal Danish Academy of Science in 1778. With copper engravings.] (in German). Augsburg: Klett- und Frank'sche Buchhandlung. p. 61.
