= Nikon Museum =

Museum in Shinagawa, Tokyo, Japan

Coordinates: 35°36′10″N 139°43′27″E

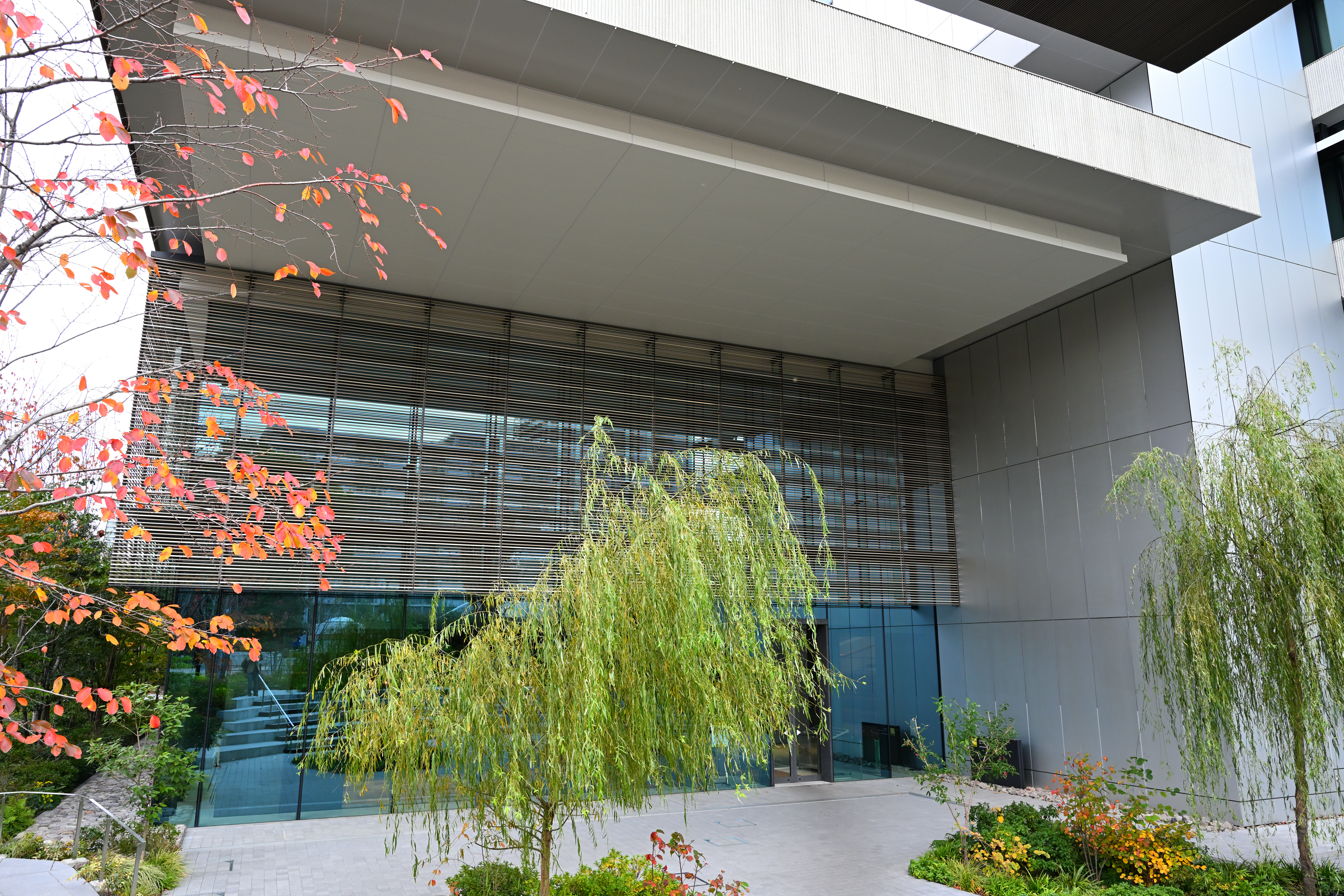

- Location within Tokyo wards area
- Established: 2015 October 17
- Location: Shinagawa, Tokyo, Japan
- Type: Industrial Museum
- Owner: Nikon Corporation
- Website: www.nikon.com/company/corporate/museum/

The Nikon Museum is a museum of Nikon products, located at Nikon headquarters in Shinagawa, Tokyo, Japan.

== Overview ==
The Nikon Museum opened in July 2017 to commemorate Nikon's 100th anniversary. It is the first facility to showcase in an organized manner a large number of optical products and technologies from the firm. The museum occupies 580 square meters, and displays a range of historical Nikon cameras, microscopes, measuring instruments, and equipment for semiconductor photolithography. The museum is the first of its type in Japan, and houses approximately 40,000 items spanning Nikon's history. According to a Nikon official, the museum's purpose is to "protect the brand...[and] put out a new product that seems attractive."

== Exhibitions ==
A Century at Nikon 光と精密、100年の足跡
A wall display introducing the history of Nikon from its inception in 1917 to present times.
Synthetic Silica Glass Ingot
A 130cm long silica glass ingot, shaped like a lens tube, represents the materials used for the production of Nikon's top-of-the-line optics during the last 100 years. There is a plaque next to the ingot with the inscription "Please touch".
Theater 映像と音楽で振り返るニコンの100年
To 和田薫 orchestra playing "Who led his own Wada". To a screening a video that interweaves the history and products of Nikon.
Lens Laboratory レンズの実験室
A small room where the most important technologies used in Nikon lenses are presented, such as anti-reflective coatings and the methods used to deal with distortions and chromatic aberration.
Spirit of Nikon 次の100年へ、受け継がれる精神
An exhibition displaying items that showcase the technical heritage and roots behind the first century of Nikon.
Feature Showcase
Includes a news camera, prototype camera, photo image electrical transmission equipment, binoculars, and eyeglass lenses,.
Imaging
From "Nikon I type" to the latest digital single-lens reflex camera, display the camera and the lens of about 450 points under one roof. Related episodes and technology commentary.
Industry
Semiconductor manufacturing and measurement equipment. Includes an operating demonstration of the reduction projection type exposure apparatus used in semiconductor manufacturing.
Bio-science and Medical Imaging
An exhibit showcasing Nikon's involvement in healthcare and medical fields. Displayed items include microscopes, medical imaging devices, and bio-stations used in medical laboratories.
Space
A wall emphasizing the role that Nikon played in the conquest and subsequent research of outer space.

Nikon in Motion

A small room with historical Nikkor lenses. Includes a movie, "Made by Nikon", presenting the stories of Nikon employees all over the world.

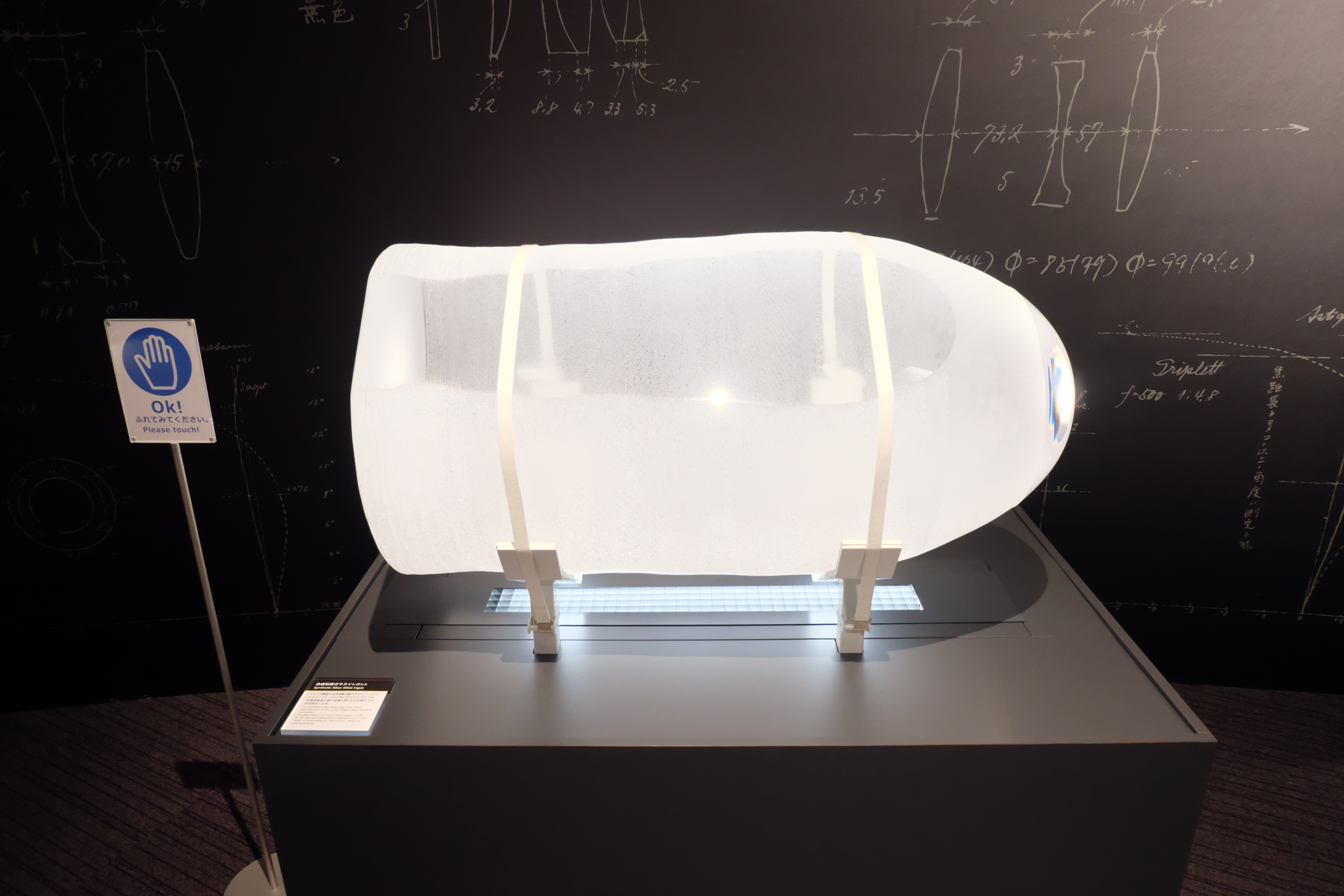
Synthetic quartz glass ingot developed for semiconductor exposure equipment.

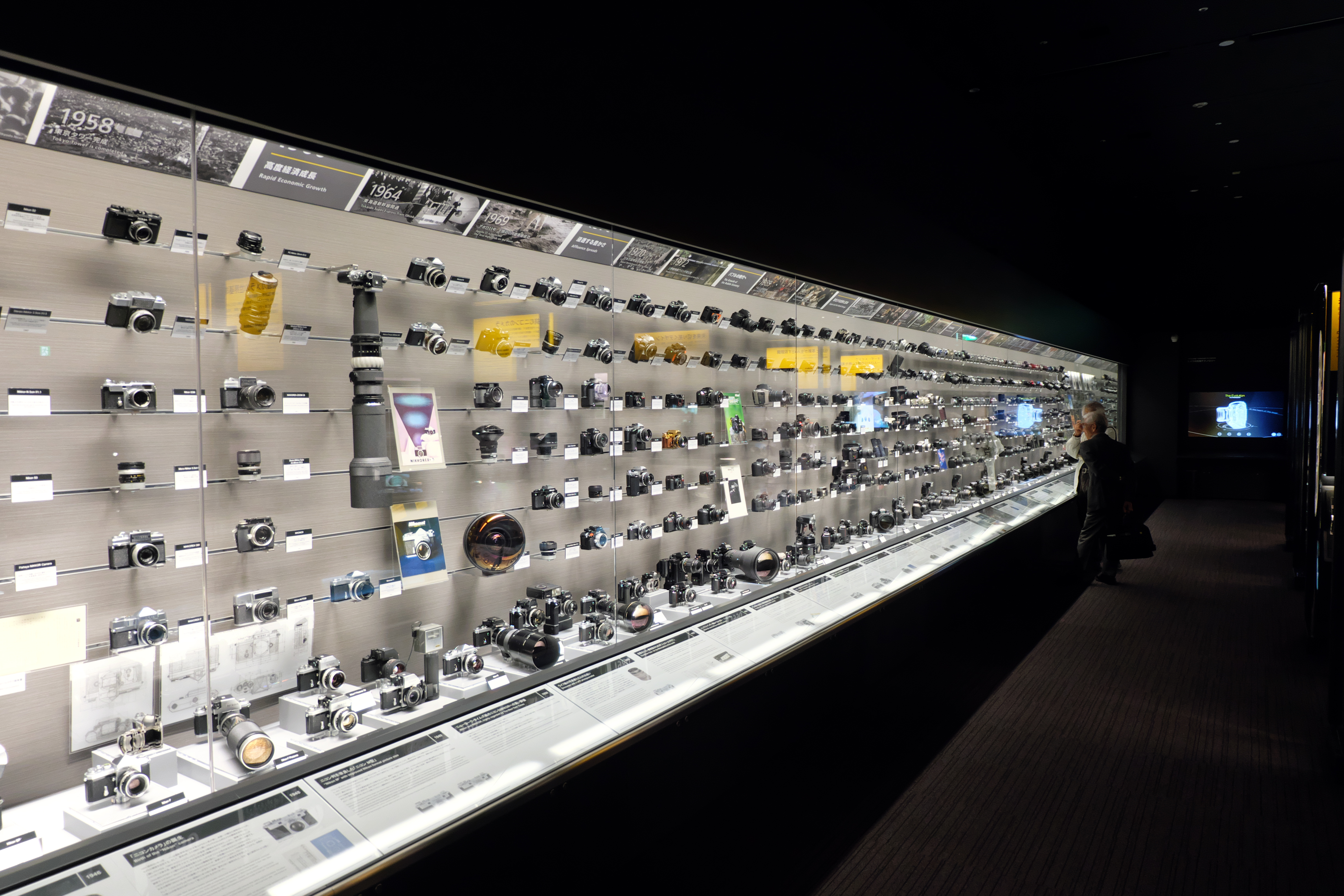
Exhibit of about 450 models of Nikon cameras.

== Museum shop ==
A small museum shop is located at the side entrance. Merchandise includes camera-patterned playing cards, drinking tumblers in the shape of lenses, Yōkan (nikon yōkan) and more.
