= Edward Dudley Norman =

Yang Berbahagia Edward Dudley Norman DSO DSC PJM PKB

1st Chief of Navy (Malaya)
- In office 15 May 1957 – 7 February 1960
- Monarch: Yang di-Pertuan Agong Tuanku Abdul Rahman
- Prime Minister: Tunku Abdul Rahman
- Preceded by: Captain H.E.H. Nicholls RN
- Succeeded by: Captain William John Dovers RAN

Personal details
- Born: 2 August 1910 Burton Bradstock, Dorset, England
- Died: 1998 (aged 87–88)
- Parent: Vice Admiral A.H. Norman RN (father)
- Education: Armed Forces Staff College
- Occupation: Former senior military officer

Military service
- Allegiance: United Kingdom; Federation of Malaya
- Branch/service: Royal Navy; Royal Malayan Navy
- Years of service: 1934–1960
- Rank: Commodore (RMN); Captain (RN)
- Unit: Royal Navy Submarine Service
- Commands: HMS H44; HMS Otway; HMS Upright; HMS Graph; HMS Tuna; HMS Alcide; HMS Heron; HMS Nereide
- Battles/wars: World War II; Siege of Malta; Malayan Emergency
- Awards: Distinguished Service Cross; Distinguished Service Order; Pingat Jasa Malaysia; Active Service Medal (Malaya)

Commodore Edward Dudley Norman DSO DSC PJM PKB (2 August 1910 – 1998, in Dorset) was a distinguished World War II submarine commander, senior Royal Navy officer and senior Royal Malayan Navy (now known as Royal Malaysian Navy) officer. He was the first Chief of Navy for Federation of Malaya (now known as Malaysia).

== Early life ==
Norman was born on 2 August 1910, in Burton Bradstock, to Alfred Headley Norman (b. 1881; d. 1973), a Royal Navy Lieutenant (later Vice Admiral). Born into a naval family, Norman joined the Royal Navy as Cadet and later was commissioned as Lieutenant in 1934.

== Military career ==
=== Royal Navy ===
Norman was assigned to the Royal Navy Submarine Service and commanded six submarines throughout World War II. His first submarine was HMS H44, which he took command of on 12 March 1940. His mission with H44 was to conduct combat patrols in the North Sea. Under his command, H44 sank enemy shipping off the Norwegian coast, for which Norman was awarded the Distinguished Service Cross. He was then assigned to HMS Otway until December 1940.

Norman was given a new task: to take command of the Malta-based submarine HMS Upright. He was then involved in the Siege of Malta with other Royal Navy submarines. Upright and the other submarines were later dubbed "The Fighting Tenth". Their story was documented in "The Fighting Tenth: The Tenth Submarine Flotilla and the Siege of Malta," a 2003 book by John Wingate. On 5 February 1941, Upright made a torpedo attack on an Italian convoy near Kerkenah, Tunisia. But the attack failed, and all four torpedoes fired missed their targets. The hunt for the enemy convoy continued, and on 23 February, Upright torpedoed and sank the Italian merchant ship, SS Silvia Tripcovich. Two days later, on 25 February, Upright attacked an Italian convoy. Upright managed to torpedo and sink the Italian cruiser Armando Diaz; however, they missed a bigger prize, a destroyer. Because of his success in attacking the enemy convoy and also the siege, Norman was awarded the Distinguished Service Order.

Norman then took command of a surrendered German Type VIIC U-boat, U-570, which had surrendered to an RAF Hudson aircraft south of Iceland in August. The submarine was then renamed HMS Graph. Norman commanded the Graph for one year, and from his experiences, he gave valuable information to the Allies' forces about the construction, performance, and weaponry of the standard Type VII submarine. After Graph, Norman was in charge of the long-range A-Class patrol submarines HMS Tuna and HMS Alcide in the Pacific.

Norman left the Submarine Service in 1947 and was then appointed at the Admiralty in London and later as executive officer of HMS Heron (now known as RNAS Yeovilton), a naval air station, where he learned to fly. Norman later took command of HMS Nereide, a sloop on the South African Station.

=== Royal Malayan Navy ===
Prior to 1957, Norman operated in the Southern Atlantic with HMS Nereide. The Malayan government began purchasing Royal Navy minesweepers after gaining independence from the United Kingdom in 1957, and Norman was promoted to captain by the Royal Navy to assist the newly formed Royal Malayan Navy as the Commanding Officer of the Royal Malayan Navy, succeeding Captain H.E.H. Nicholls CBE DSC RN. On 1 July 1958, when the Malayan government gained complete control of the Royal Malayan Navy from the Royal Navy, Norman was lent to the new navy. Concurrently, the Malayan government promoted Norman to Commodore and appointed him as the first Chief of Navy.

Norman played a crucial role in setting up the future of the Royal Malayan Navy. All his setups helped Malayan a lot during the Indonesia–Malaysia confrontation. Under his command, Commodore Norman encourages the locals to take up important roles and officer positions in the Royal Malayan Navy. New recruiting plans are also implemented under him, causing many locals to want to join the navy.

== Retirement from military ==
Commodore E. D. Norman retired from the Royal Malayan Navy on 7 February 1960, and from the Royal Navy on 2 August 1960, with the respective ranks of Commodore (Royal Malayan Navy) and Captain (Royal Navy).

== Honours ==
Norman got numerous honours for his participation in World War II and the Malayan Emergency. His awards include the Distinguished Service Order (DSO), the Distinguished Service Cross (DSC), the Queen Elizabeth II Coronation Medal, the Active Service Medal (Malaya) (Malay: Pingat Khidmat Berbakti — PKB), and Pingat Jasa Malaysia (PJM).

== Later work ==
After his retirement, Norman became secretary of the Royal Malta Yacht Club and was involved in organising the first Whitbread Round-the-World Yacht Race (now known as The Ocean Race).
