= Stereoscopic rangefinder =

Optical device that measures distance from the observer to a target

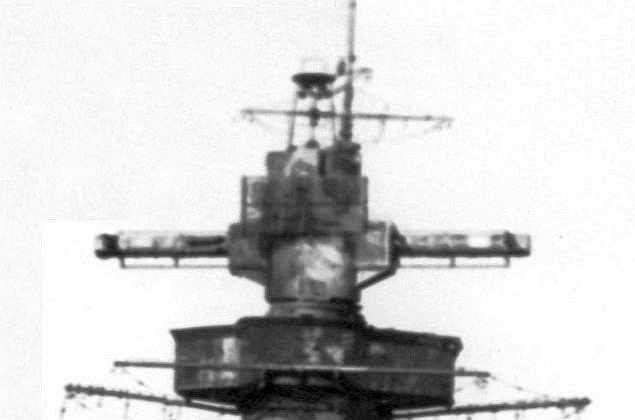
Stereoscopic rangefinder atop the bridge of the German cruiser Admiral Graf Spee

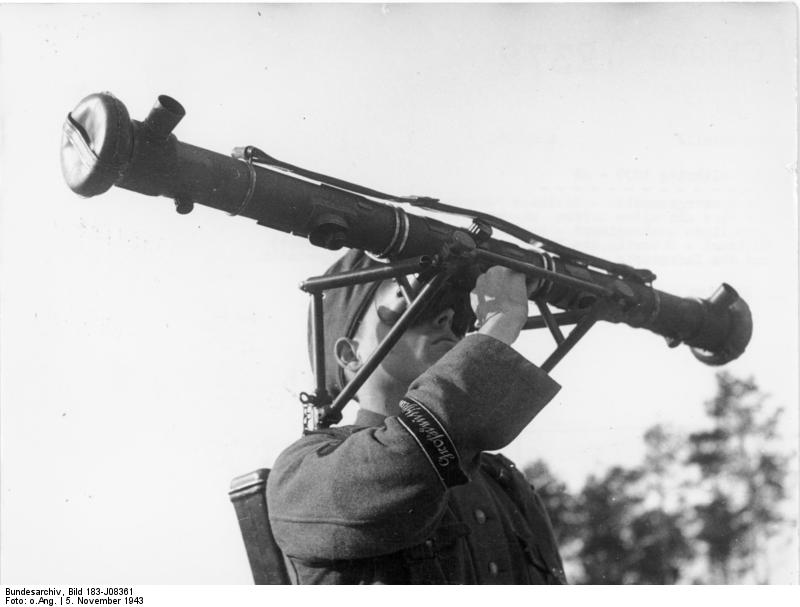
Portable stereoscopic rangefinder with binoculars from WWII

A stereoscopic rangefinder or stereoscopic telemeter is an optical device that measures distance from the observer to a target, using the observer's capability of binocular vision. It looks similar to a coincidence rangefinder, which uses different principles and has only one eyepiece. German instruments tended to use the stereoscopic principle while British ones used coincidence.

== Technical principle ==
A stereoscopic rangefinder uses two eyepieces and relies on the operator's visual cortex to merge the two images into a single picture. A reference mark is separately inserted into each eyepiece. The operator first adjusts the direction of the range finder so that the fixed mark is centered on the target, and then the prisms are rotated until the mark appears to overlap in the operator's combined view. The range to the target is proportional to the degree of rotation of the prisms.

== Coincidence vs stereoscopic rangefinders ==
In November and December 1941, the United States National Defense Research Committee conducted extensive tests between the American Bausch and Lomb M1 stereoscopic rangefinder and the British Barr and Stroud FQ 25 and UB 7 coincidence rangefinders, and concluded "that the tests indicate no important difference in the precision obtainable from the two types of instrument – coincidence and stereoscopic. They do indicate, however, that the difference in performance between large and small instruments is by no means as great as would be anticipated from simple geometrical optics. The report concludes with the belief that stereoscopic and coincidence acuities are about equal. Under favourable conditions existing instruments of the two types perform about equally well, and the choice between them for any given purpose must be based on matters of convenience related to the particular conditions under which they are to be used."

== Height finder ==
The angle of sight of a rangefinder and the range to the target can be combined in a simple computer to produce a measurement of altitude. The resulting instrument becomes a combined height-finder/rangefinder and was standard equipment for land and naval based anti-aircraft units. The stereoscopic rangefinder was preferred to coincidence rangefinders for anti-aircraft artillery because small, fast moving objects in front of a low-contrast sky could easily be tracked.

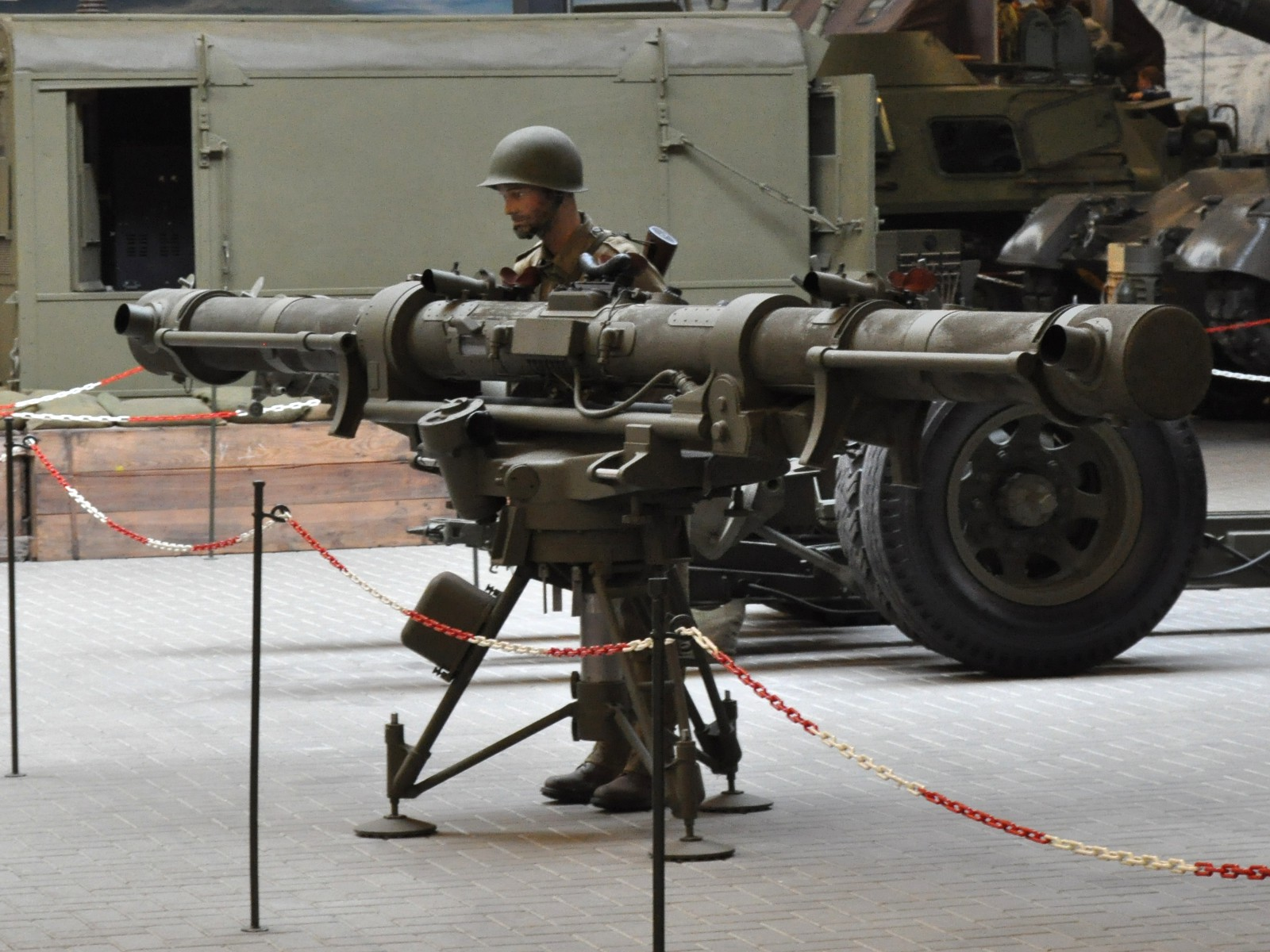
Stereoscopic rangefinder (Bausch & Lomb M2) at Overloon War Museum, Netherlands.

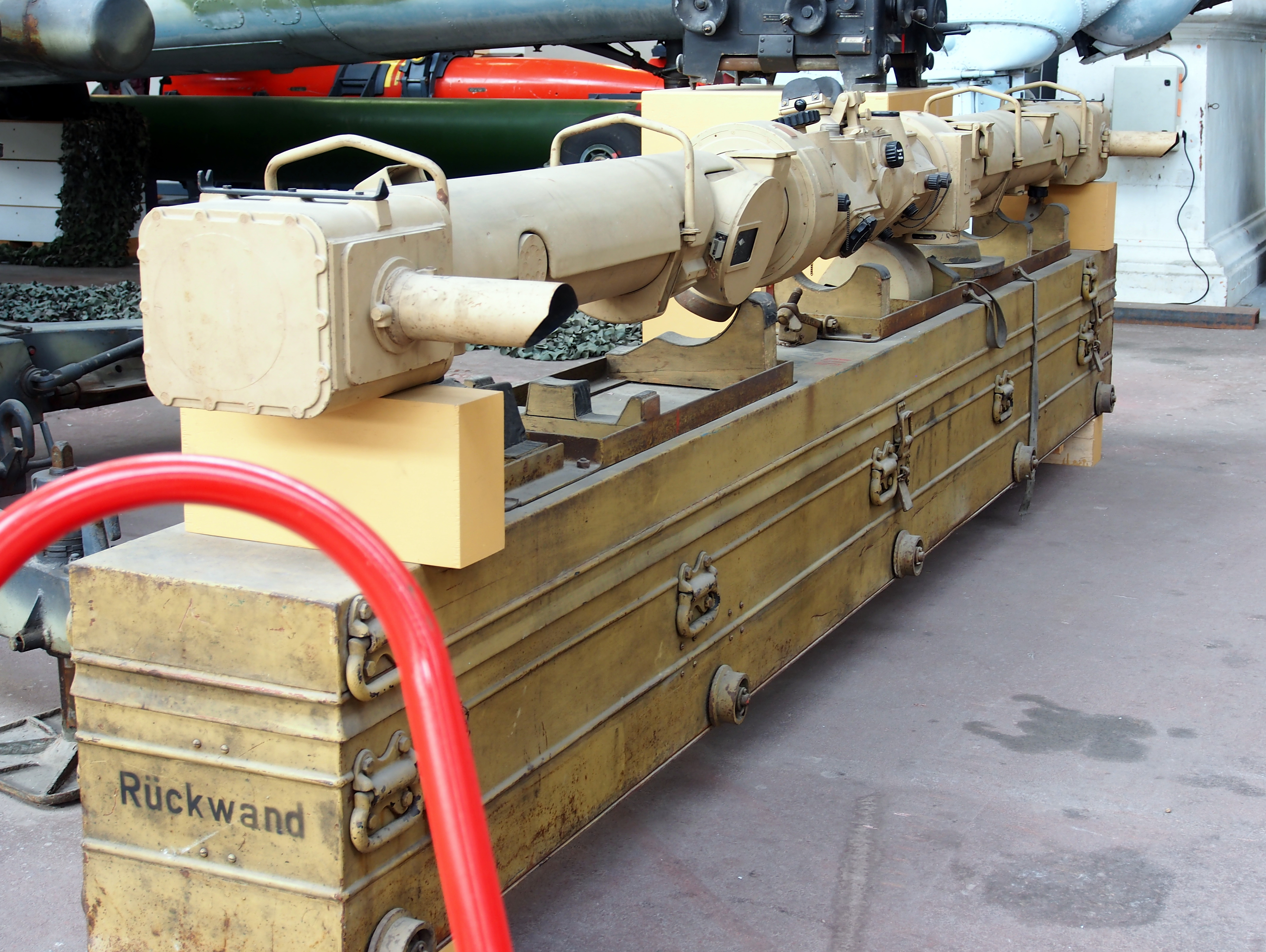
German stereoscopic rangefinder (Em.4m.R40) at Musee Royale de l'Armee et d'Histoire Militaire, Brussels.

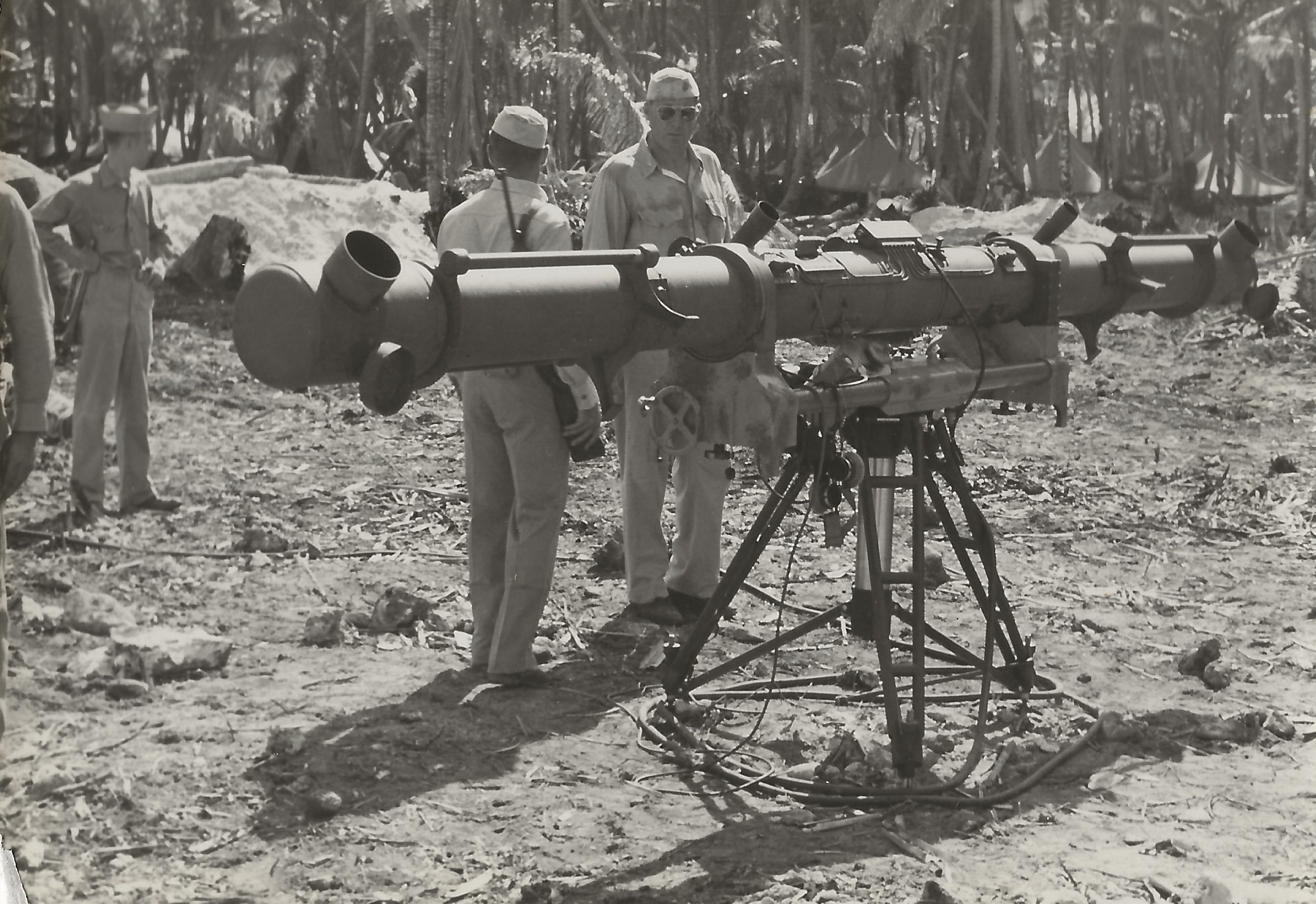
Stereoscopic rangefinder (Bausch & Lomb M1) being used by the United States Marine Corps's 2d Airdrome Battalion on Nukufetau on November 27, 1943.

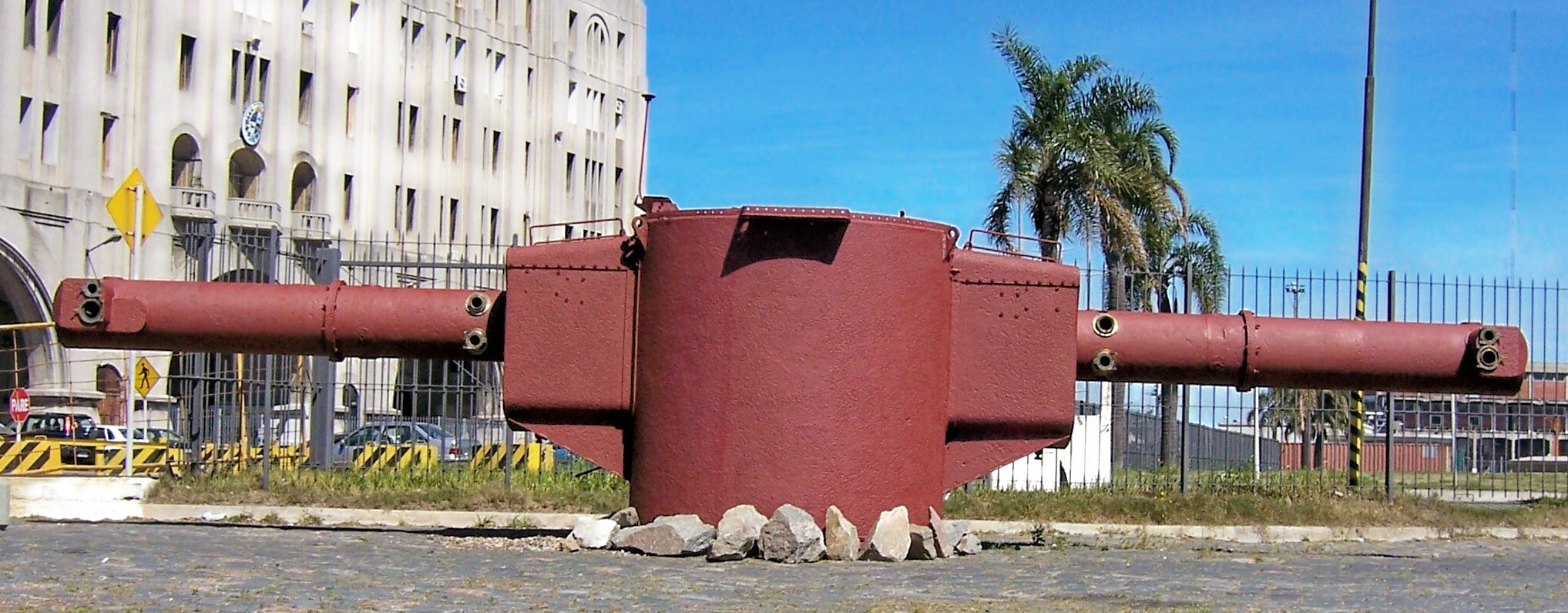
Stereoscopic rangefinder salvaged from the German cruiser Admiral Graf Spee on display in Montevideo, Uruguay

== See also ==
- Stadiametric rangefinding
- Coincidence rangefinder
- Rangefinder
- Telemeter
