= List of British Formula Three champions =

This article contains a list of British Formula Three champions. The championship has been in existence intermittently since 1951 and has some former champions who later made Formula One. The most notable among these are multiple Formula One world champions Ayrton Senna, Jackie Stewart, Nelson Piquet, Jim Clark, Emerson Fittipaldi and Mika Häkkinen. This list does not include champions of the BRDC British Formula 3 Championship.

== By season ==
| Season | Series Name | Champion | Team | Chassis/engine | National Class Champion |
|---|---|---|---|---|---|
| 1951 | Autosport F3 | (United Kingdom) Eric Brandon | | Cooper-Norton | |
| 1952 | Autosport F3 | (United Kingdom) Don Parker | | Kieft-Norton | |
| 1953 | Autosport F3 | (United Kingdom) Don Parker | | Kieft-Norton | |
| 1954 | BRSCC National F3 | (United Kingdom) Les Leston | | Cooper-Norton | |
| 1955 | BRSCC National F3 | (United Kingdom) Jim Russell | | Cooper-Norton | |
| 1955 | JAP F3 | (United Kingdom) Henry Taylor | | Cooper-JAP | |
| 1956 | BRSCC National F3 | (United Kingdom) Jim Russell | | Cooper-Norton | |
| 1957 | BRSCC National F3 | (United Kingdom) Jim Russell | | Cooper-Norton | |
| 1958 | BRSCC National F3 | (United Kingdom) Trevor Taylor | | Cooper-Norton | |
| 1959 | BRSCC F3 | (United Kingdom) Don Parker | | Cooper-Norton | |
| 1960 | John Davy Formula Junior | (United Kingdom) Jim Clark | | Lotus-Ford | |
| 1960 | BRSCC Formula Junior | (United Kingdom) Jack Pitcher | | Alexis-BMC | |
| 1960 | Motor Racing Formula Junior | (United Kingdom) Jim Clark (United Kingdom) Trevor Taylor | | Lotus-Ford | |
| 1961 | John Davy Formula Junior | (United Kingdom) Bill Moss | | Gemini-Ford | |
| 1961 | BRSCC Formula Junior | (United Kingdom) Mike Ledbrook | | Lotus-Ford | |
| 1961 | Motor Racing Formula Junior | (United Kingdom) Trevor Taylor | | Lotus-Ford | |
| 1962 | John Davy Formula Junior | (United Kingdom) John Fenning | (United Kingdom) Ron Harris | Lotus-Ford | |
| 1963 | BARC Express & Star Formula Junior | (United Kingdom) Peter Arundell | (United Kingdom) Ron Harris – Team Lotus | Lotus-Ford | |
| 1964 | Express & Star F3 | (United Kingdom) Jackie Stewart | (United Kingdom) Tyrrell Racing | Cooper-BMC | |
| 1964 | BRSCC F3 | (United Kingdom) Rodney Banting | driver | Lotus-BMC | |
| 1964 | SMRC F3 | (Iceland) Sverrir Thoroddsson | (United Kingdom) Jim Russell Racing Driver School | Lotus-Ford-Cosworth | |
| 1965 | BRSCC F3 | (United Kingdom) Tony Dean | driver | Brabham-Ford-Cosworth | |
| 1965 | BARC F3 | (United States) Roy Pike | (United States) California Racing Partnership | Brabham-Ford-Cosworth | |
| 1966 | Les Leston F3 | (United Kingdom) Harry Stiller | driver | Brabham-Ford-Cosworth | |
| 1967 | Les Leston F3 | (United Kingdom) Harry Stiller | driver | Brabham-Ford-Cosworth | |
| 1968 | Lombank F3 | (Australia) Tim Schenken | (United Kingdom) Sports Motors (Manchester) | Chevron-Ford-Lucas | |
| 1969 | Lombank F3 | (Brazil) Emerson Fittipaldi | (United Kingdom) Jim Russell Racing Driver School | Lotus-Ford-Holbay | |
| 1970 | Lombank F3 | (Australia) Dave Walker | (United Kingdom) Team Lotus | Lotus-Ford-Holbay | |
| 1970 | Shellsport F3 | (United Kingdom) Tony Trimmer | (United Kingdom) Race Cars International | Brabham-Ford-Holbay | |
| 1970 | Forward Trust F3 | (Brazil) Carlos Pace | (United Kingdom) Jim Russell Racing Driver School | Lotus-Ford-Holbay | |
| 1971 | Lombard North F3 | (United Kingdom) Roger Williamson | (United Kingdom) Wheatcroft Racing | March-Ford-Holbay | |
| 1971 | Shellsport National F3 | (Australia) Dave Walker | (United Kingdom) Team Lotus | Lotus-Ford-Vegantune | |
| 1971 | Forward Trust BARC F3 | (Australia) Dave Walker | (United Kingdom) Team Lotus | Lotus-Ford-Vegantune | |
| 1972 | Forward Trust BARC F3 | (United Kingdom) Roger Williamson | (United Kingdom) Wheatcroft Racing | GRD-Ford-Holbay | |
| 1972 | Lombard North F3 | (Liechtenstein) Rikky von Opel | (United Kingdom) Team Ensign | Ensign-Ford-Vegantune | |
| 1972 | Shellsport National F3 | (United Kingdom) Roger Williamson | (United Kingdom) Wheatcroft Racing | GRD-Ford-Holbay | |
| 1973 | Forward Trust BARC F3 | (United Kingdom) Ian Taylor | driver | March-Ford-Holbay | |
| 1973 | Lombard North F3 | (United Kingdom) Tony Brise | (United Kingdom) Team Kent Messenger Racing | March-Ford-Holbay | |
| 1973 | John Player European F3 | (United Kingdom) Tony Brise | (United Kingdom) Team Kent Messenger Racing | March-Ford-Holbay | |
| 1974 | Forward Trust BARC F3 | (United Kingdom) Brian Henton | (United Kingdom) March Engineering | March-Ford-Holbay | |
| 1974 | Lombard North F3 | (United Kingdom) Brian Henton | (United Kingdom) March Engineering | March-Ford-Holbay | |
| 1975 | BP Super Visco F3 | (Sweden) Gunnar Nilsson | (United Kingdom) March Engineering | March-Toyota | |
| 1976 | Shellsport F3 | (Italy) Bruno Giacomelli | (United Kingdom) March Engineering | March-Toyota | |
| 1976 | BP Super Visco F3 | (United Kingdom) Rupert Keegan | driver | March-Toyota | |
| 1977 | Vandervell F3 | (United Kingdom) Stephen South | (United Kingdom) Alan Docking Racing | March-Toyota | |
| 1977 | BP F3 | (Republic of Ireland) Derek Daly | (Republic of Ireland) Derek McMahon Racing | Chevron-Toyota | |
| 1978 | Vandervell F3 | (United Kingdom) Derek Warwick | driver | Ralt-Toyota | |
| 1978 | BP F3 | (Brazil) Nelson Piquet | driver | Ralt-Toyota | |
| 1979 | Vandervell British F3 | (Brazil) Chico Serra | (United Kingdom) Project Four Racing | Ralt-Toyota | |
| 1980 | Vandervell British F3 | (Sweden) Stefan Johansson | (United Kingdom) Project Four Racing | March-Toyota | |
| 1981 | Marlboro British F3 | (United Kingdom) Jonathan Palmer | (United Kingdom) West Surrey Racing | Ralt-Toyota | |
| 1982 | Marlboro British F3 | (Republic of Ireland) Tommy Byrne | (United Kingdom) Murray Taylor Racing | Ralt-Toyota | |
| 1983 | Marlboro British F3 | (Brazil) Ayrton Senna | (United Kingdom) West Surrey Racing | Ralt-Toyota | |
| 1984 | Marlboro British F3 | (United Kingdom) Johnny Dumfries | (United Kingdom) David Price Racing | Ralt-Volkswagen | (United Kingdom) Keith Fine |
| 1985 | Marlboro British F3 | (Brazil) Maurício Gugelmin | (United Kingdom) West Surrey Racing | Ralt-Volkswagen | (Jamaica) Carlton Tingling |
| 1986 | Lucas British F3 | (United Kingdom) Andy Wallace | (United Kingdom) Madgwick Motorsport | Reynard-Volkswagen | (United Kingdom) Steve Kempton |
| 1987 | Lucas British F3 | (United Kingdom) Johnny Herbert | (Republic of Ireland) Eddie Jordan Racing | Reynard-Volkswagen | (United Kingdom) Gary Dunn |
| 1988 | Lucas British F3 | (Finland) JJ Lehto | (United Kingdom) Pacific Racing | Reynard-Toyota | (United Kingdom) Alistair Lyall |
| 1989 | Lucas British F3 | (Australia) David Brabham | (United Kingdom) Bowman Racing | Ralt-Volkswagen | (Mexico) Fernando Plata |
| 1990 | British F3 | (Finland) Mika Häkkinen | (United Kingdom) West Surrey Racing | Ralt-Mugen-Honda | (United Kingdom) Charles Rickett |
| 1991 | British F3 | (Brazil) Rubens Barrichello | (United Kingdom) West Surrey Racing | Ralt-Mugen-Honda | (Finland) Pekka Herva |
| 1992 | British F3 | (Brazil) Gil de Ferran | (United Kingdom) Paul Stewart Racing | Reynard-Mugen-Honda | (United Kingdom) Paul Evans |
| 1993 | British F3 | (United Kingdom) Kelvin Burt | (United Kingdom) Paul Stewart Racing | Reynard-Mugen-Honda | (United Kingdom) Jamie Spence |
| 1994 | British F3 | (Denmark) Jan Magnussen | (United Kingdom) Paul Stewart Racing | Dallara-Mugen-Honda | (United Kingdom) Duncan Vercoe |
| 1995 | British F3 | (United Kingdom) Oliver Gavin | (United Kingdom) Edenbridge Racing | Dallara-Vauxhall | (United Kingdom) Martin Byford |
| 1996 | British F3 | (Republic of Ireland) Ralph Firman | (United Kingdom) Paul Stewart Racing | Dallara-Mugen-Honda | (New Zealand) Simon Wills |
| 1997 | Autosport British F3 | (United Kingdom) Jonny Kane | (United Kingdom) Paul Stewart Racing | Dallara-Mugen-Honda | (United Kingdom) Martin O'Connell |
| 1998 | Autosport British F3 | (Brazil) Mario Haberfeld | (United Kingdom) Paul Stewart Racing | Dallara-Mugen-Honda | (Australia) Phillip Scifleet |
| 1999 | Autosport British F3 | (United Kingdom) Marc Hynes | (United Kingdom) Manor Motorsport | Dallara-Mugen-Honda | (United Kingdom) Martin O'Connell |
| 2000 | Green Flag British F3 | (Brazil) Antônio Pizzonia | (United Kingdom) Manor Motorsport | Dallara-Mugen-Honda | (United Kingdom) Gary Paffett |
| 2001 | Green Flag British F3 | (Japan) Takuma Sato | (United Kingdom) Carlin Motorsport | Dallara-Mugen-Honda | (United Kingdom) Robbie Kerr |
| 2002 | Green Flag British F3 | (United Kingdom) Robbie Kerr | (United Kingdom) Alan Docking Racing | Dallara-Mugen-Honda | (United Kingdom) Adam Carroll |
| 2003 | British F3 International | (South Africa) Alan van der Merwe | (United Kingdom) Carlin Motorsport | Dallara-Mugen-Honda | (Venezuela) Ernesto Viso |
| 2004 | British F3 International | (Brazil) Nelson Piquet Jr. | (Brazil) Piquet Sports | Dallara-Mugen-Honda | (United Kingdom) Ryan Lewis |
| 2005 | British F3 International | (Portugal) Álvaro Parente | (United Kingdom) Carlin Motorsport | Dallara-Mugen-Honda | (Mexico) Salvador Durán |
| 2006 | Lloyds TSB Insurance British F3 International | (United Kingdom) Mike Conway | (United Kingdom) Räikkönen Robertson Racing | Dallara-AMG-Mercedes | (Venezuela) Rodolfo González |
| 2007 | Lloyds TSB Insurance British F3 International | (Estonia) Marko Asmer | (United Kingdom) Hitech Racing | Dallara-AMG-Mercedes | (Mexico) Sergio Pérez |
| 2008 | British F3 International | (Spain) Jaime Alguersuari | (United Kingdom) Carlin Motorsport | Dallara-AMG-Mercedes | (United Kingdom) Jay Bridger |
| 2009 | Cooper Tires British F3 International Series | (Australia) Daniel Ricciardo | (United Kingdom) Carlin Motorsport | Dallara-Volkswagen | (United Kingdom) Daniel McKenzie |
| 2010 | Cooper Tires British F3 International Series | (France) Jean-Éric Vergne | (United Kingdom) Carlin Motorsport | Dallara-Volkswagen | (United Kingdom) Menasheh Idafar |
| 2011 | Cooper Tires British F3 International Series | (Brazil) Felipe Nasr | (United Kingdom) Carlin | Dallara-Volkswagen | (Japan) Kotaro Sakurai |
| 2012 | Cooper Tires British F3 International Series | (United Kingdom) Jack Harvey | (United Kingdom) Carlin | Dallara-Volkswagen | (Australia) Spike Goddard |
| 2013 | Cooper Tires British F3 International Series | (United Kingdom) Jordan King | (United Kingdom) Carlin | Dallara-Volkswagen | (China) Sun Zheng |
| 2014 | Cooper Tires British F3 International Series | (China) Martin Cao | (United Kingdom) Fortec Motorsports | Dallara-Mercedes | not awarded |

== By driver nationality ==
| Pos | Nation | Championships |
|---|---|---|
| 1 | United Kingdom | 51 |
| 2 | Brazil | 12 |
| 3 | Australia | 7 |
| 4 | Ireland | 3 |
| 5 | Sweden | 2 |
| 5 | Finland | 2 |
| 7 | Liechtenstein | 1 |
| 7 | Iceland | 1 |
| 7 | Italy | 1 |
| 7 | Denmark | 1 |
| 7 | Japan | 1 |
| 7 | South Africa | 1 |
| 7 | Portugal | 1 |
| 7 | Estonia | 1 |
| 7 | Spain | 1 |
| 7 | France | 1 |
| 7 | China | 1 |

== Multiple champions ==
Drivers
| Driver | Championships |
|---|---|
| (United Kingdom) Don Parker | 3 - 1952, 1953, 1959 |
| (United Kingdom) Jim Russell | 3 - 1955 (BRSCC National), 1956, 1957 |
| (United Kingdom) Trevor Taylor | 3 - 1958, 1960 (Motor Racing Formula Junior), 1961 (Motor Racing Formula Junior) |
| (Australia) Dave Walker | 3 - 1970 (Lombank), 1971 (Shellsport National), 1971 (Forward Trust BARC) |
| (United Kingdom) Roger Williamson | 3 - 1971 (Lombard North), 1972 (Forward Trust BARC), 1972 (Shellsport National) |
| (United Kingdom) Jim Clark | 2 - 1960 (John Davy Formula Junior), 1960 (Motor Racing Formula Junior) |
| (United Kingdom) Harry Stiller | 2 - 1966, 1967 |
| (United Kingdom) Tony Brise | 2 - 1973 (Lombard North), 1973 (John Player European) |
| (United Kingdom) Brian Henton | 2 - 1974 (Forward Trust BARC), 1974 (Lombard North) |
Teams
| Team | Championships |
| (United Kingdom) Carlin | 9 - 2001, 2003, 2005, 2008, 2009, 2010, 2011, 2012, 2013 |
| (United Kingdom) Paul Stewart Racing | 6 - 1992, 1993, 1994, 1996, 1997, 1998 |
| (United Kingdom) West Surrey Racing | 5 - 1982, 1983, 1985, 1990, 1991 |
