= 1975 British Formula Three season =

Seasons
- ← 1974 1976 →

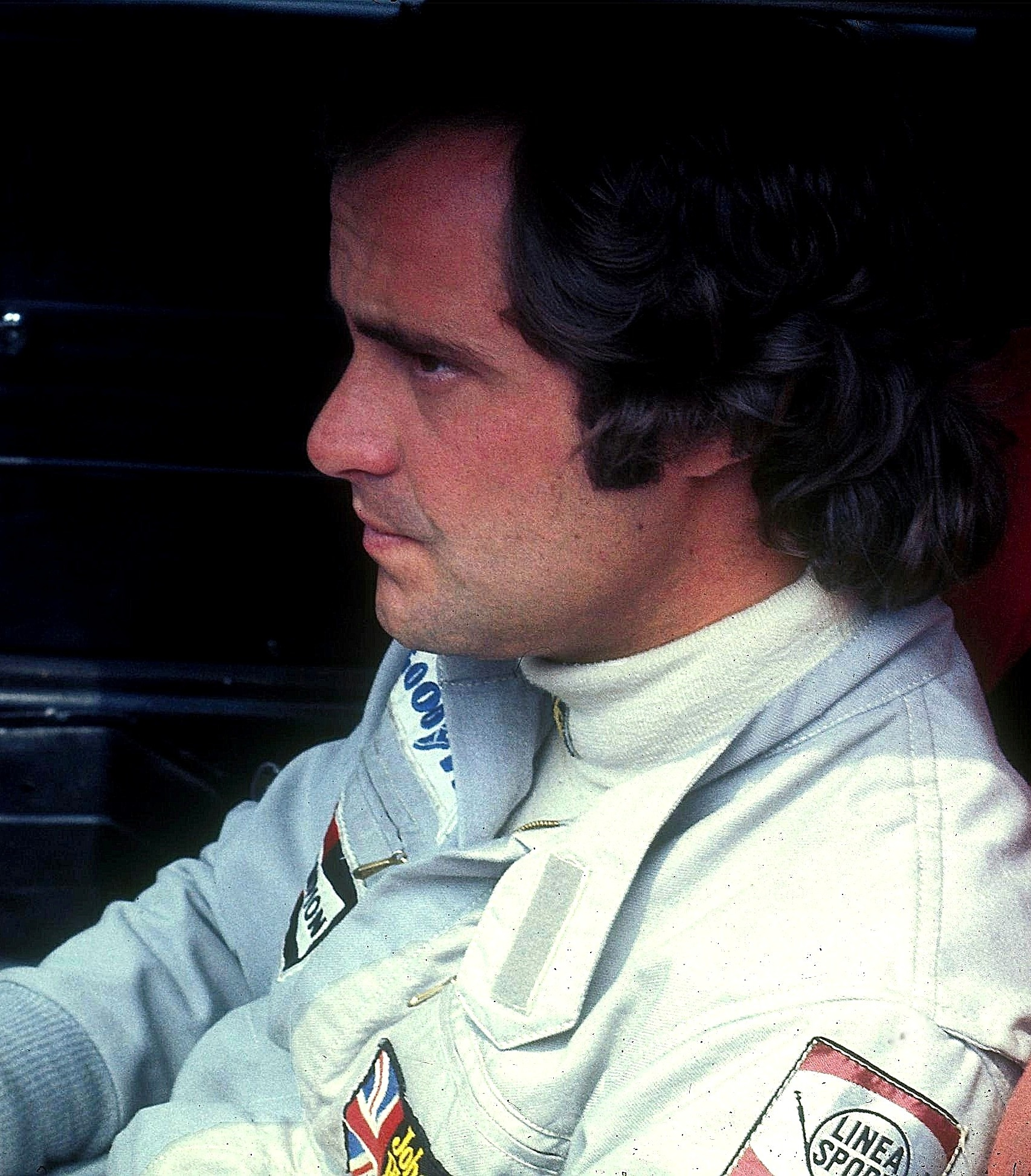
1975 champion, Gunnar Nilsson

The 1975 B.A.R.C. BP Super Visco British F3 Championship was the 25th season of the British Formula 3 season. Sweden's Gunnar Nilsson took the title.

After the poor 1974 season, Formula Three was completely revived in 1975, not just in Britain but in Italy, Sweden and Germany. The British series, sponsored by BP and organised by the B.A.R.C., was the most important of these as it was the only one open to drivers of all nationalities and was regarded by some as the effective European championship. There was also a European Cup, but in this first season it was barely noticed. The BP championship dominated by three works operations: March, with drivers Gunnar Nilsson and Alex Ribeiro, Modus, with Danny Sullivan, and Safir, with Patrick Nève. The works GRD operation also mounted a comeback but it was a failure, despite a surprise GRD win at Monaco, and the company collapsed the following year. Nilsson was a worthy champion, winning five British championship events plus three others, including the opening round of the Swedish series in April.

== B.A.R.C. BP Super Visco British F3 Championship ==
Champion: (Sweden) Gunnar Nilsson

Joint Runners-up: (Brazil) Alex Ribeiro & (United States) Danny Sullivan

The scoring system was 9-6-4-3-2-1 points to the first six classified finishers, with 1 (one) extra point added to the driver who set the fastest lap of the race. All results counted.

=== Results ===
| Date | Round | Circuit | Winning driver | Winning team | Winning car |
|---|---|---|---|---|---|
| 02/03/75 | N/C | (United Kingdom) Thruxton | (Brazil) Alex Ribeiro | March Engineering Ltd | March 753-Toyota |
| 31/03/75 | Rd.1 | (United Kingdom) Thruxton | (Sweden) Gunnar Nilsson | March Engineering Ltd | March 753-Toyota |
| 19/04/75 | N/C | (United Kingdom) Aintree | (Sweden) Gunnar Nilsson | March Engineering Ltd | March 753-Toyota |
| 27/04/75 | Rd.2 | (United Kingdom) Silverstone (Club) | (United States) Danny Sullivan | Team Modus | Modus M1-Ford |
| 10/05/75 | Rd.3 | Monaco | (Italy) Renzo Zorzi | Scuderia Mirabella Mille Miglia | GRD 374-Lancia |
| 18/05/75 | Rd.4 | (United Kingdom) Brands Hatch (Club) | (Brazil) Alex Ribeiro | March Engineering Ltd | March 753-Toyota |
| 26/05/75 | Rd.5 | (United Kingdom) Thruxton | (Sweden) Gunnar Nilsson | March Engineering Ltd | March 753-Toyota |
| 08/06/75 | Rd.6 | (Sweden) Anderstorp | (Sweden) Conny Andersson | Rotel Racing | March 753-Toyota |
| 15/06/75 | Rd.7 | (United Kingdom) Snetterton | (Sweden) Gunnar Nilsson | March Engineering Ltd | March 753-Toyota |
| 22/06/75 | N/C | (United Kingdom) Cadwell Park | (United Kingdom) Chris Barnett | Chris Barnett | March 753-BMW |
| 29/06/75 | Rd.8 | (Italy) Monza | (Australia) Larry Perkins | Team Cowangie | Ralt RT1-Ford |
| 13/07/75 | Rd.9 | (United Kingdom) Cadwell Park | (United States) Danny Sullivan | Team Modus | Modus M1-Toyota |
| 19/07/75 | Rd.10 | (United Kingdom) Silverstone | (Sweden) Gunnar Nilsson | March Engineering Ltd | March 753-Toyota |
| 26/07/75 | Rd.11 | (United Kingdom) Oulton Park | (United States) Danny Sullivan | Team Modus | Modus M1-Toyota |
| 03/08/75 | Rd12 | (United Kingdom) Knockhill | (Belgium) Patrick Nève | Safir Engineering Ltd | Safir RJ03S-Ford |
| 17/08/75 | Rd.13 | (United Kingdom) Thruxton | (Brazil) Alex Ribeiro | March Engineering Ltd | March 753-Toyota |
| 25/08/75 | Rd.14 | (United Kingdom) Silverstone (Club) | (United States) Eddie Cheever | Henry Morrogh Racing Driving School | Modus M1-Ford |
| 31/08/75 | Rd.15 | (United Kingdom) Silverstone | (United States) Eddie Cheever | Henry Morrogh Racing Driving School | Modus M1-Toyota |
| 07/09/75 | N/C | (United Kingdom) Brands Hatch | (Australia) Larry Perkins | Team Cowangie | Ralt RT1-Toyota |
| 21/09/75 | Rd.16 | (United Kingdom) Brands Hatch | (Australia) Larry Perkins | Team Cowangie | Ralt RT1-Toyota |
| 28/09/75 | Rd.17 | (United Kingdom) Silverstone | (Sweden) Gunnar Nilsson | March Engineering Ltd | March 753-Toyota |
| 04/10/75 | Rd.18 | (United Kingdom) Oulton Park | (Brazil) Ingo Hoffmann | Ingo Hoffmann | March 753-Toyota |
| 26/10/75 | Rd.19 | (United Kingdom) Thruxton | (Brazil) Alex Ribeiro | March Engineering Ltd | March 753-Toyota |
| 15/11/75 | N/C | (United Kingdom) Thruxton | (Sweden) Gunnar Nilsson | March Engineering Ltd | March 753-Toyota |

=== Drivers' Championship ===
| Pos | Driver | Entrant | THR (United Kingdom) | SIL (United Kingdom) | MON (Monaco) | BRH (United Kingdom) | THR (United Kingdom) | AND (Sweden) | SNE (United Kingdom) | MOZ (Italy) | CAP (United Kingdom) | SIL (United Kingdom) | OUL (United Kingdom) | KNO (United Kingdom) | THR (United Kingdom) | SIL (United Kingdom) | SIL (United Kingdom) | BRH (United Kingdom) | SIL (United Kingdom) | OUL (United Kingdom) | THR (United Kingdom) | Pts |
|---|---|---|---|---|---|---|---|---|---|---|---|---|---|---|---|---|---|---|---|---|---|---|
| 1 | (Sweden) Gunnar Nilsson | March Engineering | 1 | DNA | DNQ | 2 | 1 | Ret | 1 | DNS | Ret | 1 | DNS | 3 | 4 | 3 | Ret | 3 | 1 | 4 | 7 | 74 |
| 2 | (Brazil) Alex Ribeiro | March Engineering | 8 | Ret | Ret | 1 | 6 | Ret | Ret | DSQ | 2 | Ret | 8 | 7 | 1 | 2 | Ret | 2 | 5 | 2 | 1 | 59 |
| 3 | (United States) Danny Sullivan | Team Modus | Ret | 1 | Ret | DNA | 3 | Ret | 9 | DNQ | 1 | Ret | 1 | 2 | 2 | 4 | Ret | 4 | Ret | Ret | 2 | 59 |
| 4 | (Belgium) Patrick Nève | Safir Engineering Ltd | 2 | Ret | 2 | 3 | 2 | DNS | 5 | DNQ | Ret | 2 | | 1 | 5 | 5 | Ret | DNS | Ret | Ret | 4 | 50 |
| 5 | (Australia) Larry Perkins | Team Cowanige | 5 | Ret | Ret | | 7 | | 19 | 1 | | 9 | | | | | 2 | 1 | 2 | 3 | 5 | 40 |
| 6 | (Brazil) Ingo Hoffman | Ingo Hoffman | | 5 | 6 | 7 | Ret | 9 | 3 | DNA | 4 | 6 | 3 | 4 | 3 | 8 | Ret | 6 | 20 | 1 | DNS | 33 |
| 7 | (United States) Eddie Cheever | Henry Morrogh Racing Driving School | | 23 | | | | | | | | Ret | Ret | Ret | Ret | 1 | 1 | Ret | 9 | 5 | Ret | 21 |
| 8 | (New Zealand) Richard Hawkins | F.S. Ratcliffe Springs (Rochdale) Ltd | | Ret | 21 | 6 | 5 | 35 | 16 | | 13 | 3 | 2 | Ret | 8 | 16 | 4 | Ret | 4 | Ret | 9 | 19 |
| 9 | (Belgium) Pierre Dieudonné | Bang & Olufsen Team Michel Vaillant | DNS | DSQ | 22 | 8 | 9 | DNS | 2 | DNQ | | 7 | 4 | 6 | DNA | 14 | 3 | Ret | 3 | 8 | 10 | 18 |
| 10 | (United Kingdom) Stephen South | Rayrace International | 6 | Ret | Ret | 5 | 25 | 6 | Ret | DNA | 18 | Ret | 21 | | DNS | 6 | Ret | 8 | 6 | 6 | 3 | 13 |
| 11 | (Sweden) Conny Andersson | Rotel Racing | | | 4 | | | 1 | | Ret | | 25 | | | | | | | | | | 12 |
| 12 | (Italy) Renzo Zorzi | Scuderia Mirabella Mille Miglia | | | 1 | | | | | DNQ | | DNQ | | | | | | | | | | 9 |
| 13 | (Belgium) Hervé Regout | Bang & Olufsen Team Michel Vaillant | 12 | 3 | Ret | 13 | 4 | 15 | 6 | 8 | | 22 | 7 | Ret | DNA | 13 | Ret | 7 | Ret | Ret | 15 | 8 |
| 14 | (United Kingdom) Bob Arnott | Swan Song Records | 3 | DNS | 23 | 9 | 8 | 11 | 15 | 9 | DNS | 21 | 5 | | | 10 | 12 | 5 | 10 | 9 | 8 | 8 |
| 15 | (Sweden) Conny Ljungfeldt | Rotel Racing | | | | | | 2 | | Ret | | 8 | | | | | | | | | | 7 |
| 16 | (United Kingdom) Ian Taylor | GRD Ltd | 4 | Ret | DNA | 4 | Ret | 32 | 7 | DNA | | DNQ | 16 | | | | DNA | | | | | 7 |
| 17 | (Italy) Gianfranco Brancatelli | Scuderia Nettuno | | | 5 | | | 34 | | 4 | | 5 | | | | | | | | | | 7 |
| 18 | (Antigua and Barbuda) Mike Tyrrell | Tony Roles Racing | 7 | 2 | DNQ | 11 | 17 | | DNA | | | Ret | 13 | 14 | | | | | | | | 6 |
| 19 | (Italy) Fernando Spreafico | Fernando Spreafico | | | | | | | | 2 | | 28 | | | | | | | | | | 6 |
| 20 | (United States) Dick Parsons | Dick Parsons | Ret | Ret | DNQ | | | | Ret | | 3 | 10 | | | 6 | 9 | 8 | DNA | 22 | | DNA | 6 |
| 21 | (Sweden) Ulf Svensson | Ulf Svensson | | | 3 | | | 7 | | 6 | | 26 | | | | | | | | | | 5 |
| 22 | (United Kingdom) Peter Clark | Wisharts Garage | 13 | 4 | DNA | 16 | | | DNA | | 5 | 36 | 9 | 9 | DNA | 20 | 13 | DNA | 15 | | DNA | 5 |
| 23 | (Australia) Terry Perkins | Team Cowangie | | DNS | DNPQ | | DNS | | DNA | | | 4 | | | | | 5 | DNA | 13 | 17 | Ret | 5 |
| 24 | (Sweden) Claes Sigrudsson | Dalsy Konfektion AB | | | DNQ | | | 3 | | 15 | | | | | | | | | | | | 4 |
| 25 | (Italy) Alessandro Pesenti-Rossi | Scuderia Citta Dei Mille | | | 20 | | | 33 | | 3 | | | | | | | 27 | | | | | 4 |
| 26 | (United Kingdom) Chris Barnett | Chris Barnett | 10 | DSQ | DNQ | DNS | Ret | | 4 | DNA | Ret | Ret | 11 | | Ret | 11 | 10 | 9 | 8 | 15 | 6 | 4 |
| 27 | (Sweden) Gunnar Nordström | Team Warsteiner Eurorace | | | DNQ | | | 4 | | | | | | | | | | | | | | 3 |
| 28 | (Italy) Luciano Pavesi | Scuderia Ala d’Oro | | | 8 | | | 5 | | DNQ | | | | | | | 20 | | | | | 2 |
| 29 | (United Kingdom) Graham Hamilton | MacDonald Shand Ecurie Ecosse | 9 | Ret | DNPQ | 17 | 16 | 16 | 14 | 13 | | 34 | 12 | 5 | 11 | | 9 | 10 | DNS | 10 | Ret | 2 |
| 30 | (Italy) Piercarlo Ghinzani | Scuderia Allegrini | | | Ret | | | | | 5 | | | | | | | 23 | | | | | 2 |
| 31 | (United Kingdom) Rupert Keegan | British Air Ferries Racing Team | 11 | Ret | 9 | DNPQ | Ret | | DNA | DNA | Ret | Ret | 6 | 8 | 7 | 15 | DNA | Ret | 7 | 7 | 14 | 1 |
| 32 | (United Kingdom) Tim Brise | Team Modus | | 22 | | | 26 | | DNS | | DNS | DNA | | | 9 | 7 | 6 | Ret | 17 | DNA | DNA | 1 |
| 33 | (United Kingdom) Ken Silverstone | Ken Silverstone | Ret | 21 | DNPQ | 15 | 27 | | 20 | DNA | 6 | 32 | 23 | 10 | 12 | 22 | 22 | Ret | 18 | DNA | 16 | 1 |
| 34 | (United Kingdom) Peter Dugdale | Eric Dugdale Group Racing | 14 | 6 | | | 19 | | DNA | | | | | | | | | | | | | 1 |
| 35 | (United States) Tony Rouff | Dr Joseph Ehrlich | 18 | Ret | DNQ | 10 | Ret | | 8 | DNQ | | DNQ | 22 | | Ret | 21 | 23 | | DNS | | | 1 |
| 36 | (United Kingdom) Tony Brise | Team Modus | | | 11 | | | | | | DNS | | | | | | | | | | | 1 |

=== Table ===
| Place | Driver | Entrant | Car | Total |
|---|---|---|---|---|
| 1 | (Sweden) Gunnar Nilsson | March Engineering Ltd | March 753-Toyota | 74 |
| 2 | (Brazil) Alex Ribeiro | March Engineering Ltd | March 753-Toyota | 59 |
| 2 | (United States) Danny Sullivan | Team Modus | Modus M1-Ford; Modus M1-Toyota | 59 |
| 4 | (Belgium) Patrick Nève | Safir Engineering Ltd | Safir RJ03S-Ford | 50 |
| 5 | (Australia) Larry Perkins | Team Cowangie | Ralt RT1-Ford; Ralt RT1-Toyota | 40 |
| 6 | (Brazil) Ingo Hoffmann | Ingo Hoffmann | March 753-Ford; March 753-Toyota | 33 |
| 7 | (United States) Eddie Cheever | Henry Morrogh Racing Driving School | Modus M1-Ford; Modus M1-Toyota | 21 |
| 8 | (New Zealand) Richard Hawkins | F.S. Ratcliffe Springs (Rochdale) Ltd | March 743-Toyota | 19 |
| 9 | (Belgium) Pierre Dieudonné | Bang & Olufsen Team Michel Vaillant | March 753-BMW | 18 |
| 10 | (United Kingdom) Stephen South | Rayrace International | Ray RB3 75-Toyota; March 753-Toyota | 13 |
| 11 | (Sweden) Conny Andersson | Rotel Racing | March 753-Toyota | 12 |
| 12 | (Italy) Renzo Zorzi | Scuderia Mirabella Mille Miglia | GRD 374-Lancia | 9 |
| 13 | (United Kingdom) Bob Arnott | Swan Song Records | March 743-Ford | 8 |
| 13 | (Belgium) Hervé Regout | Bang & Olufsen Team Michel Vaillant | March 753-BMW | 8 |
| 15 | (Italy) Gianfranco Brancatelli | Scuderia Nettuno | March 753-Toyota | 7 |
| 15 | (Sweden) Conny Ljungfeldt | Rotel Racing | March 743-Toyota | 7 |
| 15 | (United Kingdom) Ian Taylor | GRD Ltd | GRD 375-Ford | 7 |
| 18 | (United States) Dick Parsons | Dick Parsons | Modus M1-Ford | 6 |
| 18 | (Italy) Fernando Spreafico | Scuderia Concordia | GRD 373-Ford | 6 |
| 18 | (Antigua and Barbuda) Mike Tyrrell | Tony Roles Racing | March 733-Ford | 6 |
| 21 | (United Kingdom) Peter Clark | Wisharts Garage | Modus M1-Ford | 5 |
| 21 | (Australia) Terry Perkins | Team Cowangie | Ralt RT1-Ford | 5 |
| 21 | (Sweden) Ulf Svensson | Ulf Svensson | Brabham BT41-Ford | 5 |
| 24 | (United Kingdom) Chris Barnett | Chris Barnett | March 753-BMW | 4 |
| 24 | (Italy) Alessandro Pesenti-Rossi | Scuderia Citta Dei Mille | March 743-Toyota | 4 |
| 24 | (Sweden) Claes Sigurdsson | Dalsy Konfektion AB | Brabham BT41-Ford | 4 |
| 27 | (Sweden) Gunnar Nordström | Team Warsteiner Eurorace | Modus M1-Toyota | 3 |
| 28 | (Italy) Piercarlo Ghinzani | Scuderia Allegrini | CRS 001-Toyota | 2 |
| 28 | (Italy) Luciano Pavesi | Scuderia Ala d’Oro | Brabham BT41-Toyota | 2 |
| 28 | (United Kingdom) Graham Hamilton | MacDonald Shand Ecurie Ecosse | March 753-Ford | 2 |
| 31 | (United Kingdom) Tim Brise | Team Modus | Modus M1-Ford | 1 |
| 31 | (United Kingdom) Tony Brise | Team Modus | Modus M1-Ford | 1 |
| 31 | (United Kingdom) Peter Dugdale | Eric Dugdale Group Racing | March 733-Ford | 1 |
| 31 | (Italy) Luigino Grassi | Luigino Grassi | Brabham BT41-Ford | 1 |
| 31 | (United Kingdom) Rupert Keegan | British Air Ferries Racing Team | March 743-Toyota | 1 |
| 31 | (United States) Tony Rouff | Dr Joseph Ehrlich | Ehrlich ES5-Ford | 1 |
| 31 | (United Kingdom) Ken Silverstone | Ken Silverstone | March 743-Ford | 1 |
