= 1976 British Formula Three season =

Seasons
- ← 1975 1977 →

The 1976 British Formula Three season was the 26th season of the British Formula Three season. Rupert Keegan took the B.A.R.C. BP Super Visco British Formula 3 Championship, while Bruno Giacomelli took the B.R.D.C. Shellsport British Formula Three Championship.

Thanks to Giacomelli's March 763-Toyota and to Keegan's old 743, March dominated the two championships with 12 race wins, the other five falling to the Chevron B34s of Geoff Lees and mid-season convert Keegan.

== B.A.R.C. BP Super Visco British F3 Championship ==
Champion: (United Kingdom) Rupert Keegan

Joint Runner Up: (Italy) Bruno Giacomelli

The scoring system was 9-6-4-3-2-1 points for the top six classified finishers, with 1 (one) extra point added to the driver who set the fastest lap of the race. All results counted.

=== Results ===
Date	Round	Circuit	Winning driver	Winning team	Winning car
07/03/76	Rd.1	(United Kingdom) Thruxton	(United Kingdom) Rupert Keegan	British Air Ferries Racing Team	March 743-Toyota
19/04/76	Rd.2	(United Kingdom) Thruxton	(United Kingdom) Rupert Keegan	British Air Ferries Racing Team	March 743-Toyota
25/04/76	Rd.3	(Belgium) Zolder	(United Kingdom) Rupert Keegan	British Air Ferries Racing Team	March 743-Toyota
09/05/76	Rd.4	(United Kingdom) Thruxton	(United Kingdom) Rupert Keegan	British Air Ferries Racing Team	March 743-Toyota
23/05/76	Rd.5	(United Kingdom) Brands Hatch (Club)	(Italy) Bruno Giacomelli	March Racing Ltd	March 763-Toyota
06/06/76	Rd.6	(United Kingdom) Silverstone (Club)	(Italy) Bruno Giacomelli	March Racing Ltd	March 763-Toyota
10/07/76	Rd.7	(United Kingdom) Oulton Park	(Italy) Bruno Giacomelli	March Racing Ltd	March 763-Toyota
17/07/76	Rd.8	(United Kingdom) Brands Hatch	(Italy) Bruno Giacomelli	March Racing Ltd	March 763-Toyota
15/08/76	Rd.9	(United Kingdom) Mallory Park	(United Kingdom) Rupert Keegan	British Air Ferries Racing Team	Chevron B43-Toyota
12/09/76	Rd.10	(United Kingdom) Thruxton	(Italy) Bruno Giacomelli	March Racing Ltd	March 763-Toyota
19/09/76	Rd.11	(United Kingdom) Snetterton	(United Kingdom) Rupert Keegan	British Air Ferries Racing Team	Chevron B43-Toyota
31/10/76	Rd.12	(United Kingdom) Thruxton	(United Kingdom) Geoff Lees	Rob Roy Racing with D.J. Bond	Chevron B43-Toyota

=== Drivers' Championship ===
Pos	Driver	Entrant	THR (United Kingdom)	THR (United Kingdom)	ZOL (Netherlands)	THR (United Kingdom)	BRH (United Kingdom)	SIL (United Kingdom)	OUL (United Kingdom)	BRH (United Kingdom)	MAL (United Kingdom)	THR (United Kingdom)	SNE (United Kingdom)	THR (United Kingdom)	Pts
1	(United Kingdom) Rupert Keegan	British Air Ferries Racing Team	1	1	1	1	2	6	2	Ret	1	2	1	Ret	74
2	(Italy) Bruno Giacomelli	March Engineering	3	3	9	Ret	1	1	1	1	2	1	3	Ret	71
3	(United Kingdom) Geoff Lees	Rob Roy Racing with D.J. Bond						12	5	3	3	3	2	1	31
4	(United Kingdom) Stephen South	Dortmunder Union Bier/Bogarts of Birmingham	2	2	7	DNA	Ret	2	Ret	Ret	Ret	4	4	Ret	26
5	(United Kingdom) Mike Young	Anglian Gilt Producers	Ret	4	3	2	Ret	3	6	7	6	8	5		21
6	(New Zealand) Brett Riley	David Price Racing		Ret		3	DSQ	Ret	3	5		12	13	4	13
7	(United Kingdom) Tiff Needell	Safir Engineering		DNS					4	6		6	Ret	2	13

=== Table ===
Place	Driver	Entrant	Car	Total
1	(United Kingdom) Rupert Keegan	British Air Ferries Racing Team	March 743-Toyota; Chevron B43-Toyota	74
2	(Italy) Bruno Giacomelli	March Racing	March 763-Toyota	71
3	(United Kingdom) Geoff Lees	Rob Roy Racing	Chevron B43-Toyota	31
4	(United Kingdom) Stephen South	Bogarts of Birmingham	March 763-Toyota	26
5	(United Kingdom) Mike Young	Anglian Gilt Producers	Modus M1-Toyota	21
6	(New Zealand) Brett Riley	Brett Riley/David Price Racing	Modus M1-Ford	13
7	(United Kingdom) Tiff Needell	Safir Engineering Ltd	Safir RJ03-Toyota	27
8	(United Kingdom) Tony Dron	Unipart Racing Team	March 763-Triumph	9
8	(Netherlands) Boy Hayje	F & S Properties	Ralt RT1-Toyota	9
10	(Sweden) Conny Andersson	March Engineering	March 763-Toyota	7
11	(Australia) Geoff Brabham	Brabham Racing Organisation	Ralt RT1-Toyota	6
11	(Brazil) Aryon Cornelsen-Filho	March Racing	March 763-Toyota	6
11	(United Kingdom) Ian Flux	Ockley Racing Team	Ralt RT1-Toyota	6
14	(United States) Dick Parsons	Dick Parsons	Anson SA1-Triumph	5
15	(New Zealand) Richard Hawkins	Dr. Joseph Ehrlich	Ehrlich ES5/6-Toyota; March 743-Toyota	4
16	(United Kingdom) Chris Barnett	Chris Barnett	March 753-Toyota	3
16	(Denmark) Jac Nellemann	Texaco Racing	Van Diemen VG376-Toyota	3
18	(United Kingdom) Bob Arnott	Bob Arnott	March 743-Toyota	2
18	(Belgium) Pierre Dieudonné	Dr. Joseph Ehrlich	March 743-Toyota	2
18	(United Kingdom) Barrie Maskell	Jeff Sharpe	Dastle Mk 10C-Ford	2
21	(Italy) Gianfranco Brancatelli	Scuderia Everest	March 763-Toyota	1
21	(United Kingdom) Ken Silverstone	Ken Silverstone	March 753-Toyota	1
21	(Antigua and Barbuda) Mike Tyrrell	Dr. Joseph Ehrlich	Ehrlich ES5/6-Toyota	1
21	(Belgium) Pascal Witmeur		March 753-Toyota	1

== B.R.D.C. Shellsport British F3 Championship ==
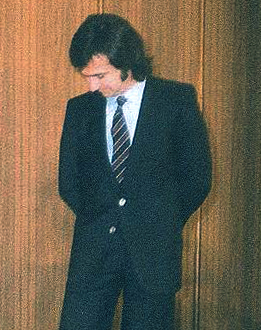
Shellsport champion, Bruno Giacomelli

Champion: (Italy) Bruno Giacomelli

Joint Runner Up: (United Kingdom) Rupert Keegan

The scoring system was 20-15-12-10-8-6-4-3-2-1 points for the top ten classified finishers. All results counted.

=== Results ===
Date	Round	Circuit	Winning driver	Winning team	Winning car
14/03/76	Rd.1	(United Kingdom) Silverstone (Club)	(United Kingdom) Rupert Keegan	British Air Ferries Racing Team	March 743-Toyota
11/04/76	Rd.2	(United Kingdom) Silverstone	(Italy) Bruno Giacomelli	March Racing Ltd	March 763-Toyota
20/06/76	Rd.3	(United Kingdom) Silverstone (Club)	(Italy) Bruno Giacomelli	March Racing Ltd	March 763-Toyota
30/08/76	Rd.4	(United Kingdom) Silverstone (Club)	(United Kingdom) Rupert Keegan	British Air Ferries Racing Team	Chevron B43-Toyota
18/09/76	Rd.5	(United Kingdom) Silverstone	(United Kingdom) Geoff Lees	Rob Roy Racing with D.J. Bond	Chevron B43-Toyota

=== Table ===
Place	Driver	Entrant	Car	Total
1	(Italy) Bruno Giacomelli	March Racing	March 763-Toyota	79
2	(United Kingdom) Rupert Keegan	British Air Ferries Racing Team	March 743-Toyota; Chevron B43-Toyota	62
3	(United Kingdom) Geoff Lees	Rob Roy Racing with D.J. Bond	Chevron B43-Toyota	42
4	(United Kingdom) Mike Young	Anglian Gilt Producers	Modus M1-Toyota	36
5	(United Kingdom) Ian Flux	Ockley Racing Team	Ralt RT1-Toyota	29
6	(United Kingdom) Stephen South	Dortmunder Union Bier/Bogarts of Birmingham	March 763-Toyota	21
7	(Austria) Willi Siller	Team Modus	Modus M1-Toyota	18
8	(Australia) Geoff Brabham	Brabham Racing Organisation	Ralt RT1-Toyota	16
9	(Brazil) Paulo Gomes	Team Modus	Modus M1-Toyota	15
10	(United Kingdom) Jan Seymour	City Speed Racing	March 743-Ford; March 743-Toyota	11
11	(Sweden) Ulf Svensson	Ulf Svensson	Ralt RT1-Toyota	10
11	(Australia) Paul Bernasconi	Paul Bernasconi	Ralt RT1-Toyota	10
13	(New Zealand) Richard Hawkins	Dr. Joseph Ehrlich	Ehrlich ES5/6-Toyota; March 743-Toyota	8
14	(United Kingdom) John Lain	Imado Watch Co Ltd	Modus M1-Toyota	7
15	(United Kingdom) Bob Arnott	Bob Arnott	March 743-Ford; March 743-Toyota	6
15	(Brazil) Aryon Cornelsen-Filho	March Racing	March 743-Toyota	6
15	(Belgium) Claude Cuicci	Ian Williams	Supernova SF376-Ford; Supernova SF376-Toyota	6
18	(United Kingdom) Barrie Maskell	Jeff Sharpe	Dastle Mk 10C-Ford	4
18	(United States) Dick Parsons	Dick Parsons	Anson SA1-Triumph	4
18	(United Kingdom) John Stokes	Dortmunder Union Bier/Bogarts of Birmingham	March 753-Toyota	4
21	(United Kingdom) Doug Bassett		GRD 373/376-Ford	2
21	(Belgium) Pierre Dieudonné	Dr. Joseph Ehrlich	March 743-Toyota	2
21	(New Zealand) Brett Riley	David Price Racing	Modus M1-Ford	2
21	(United Kingdom) Phil Silverstone	Phil Silverstone	March 763-Toyota	2
25	(United Kingdom) Tony Dron	Unipart Racing Team	March 763-Triumph	1
25	(United Kingdom) Ken Silverstone	Ken Silverstone	March 753-Toyota	1

== Non-Championship Races ==
=== Results ===
Date	Race	Circuit	Winning driver	Winning team	Winning car
27/03/76	Race of the North	(United Kingdom) Oulton Park	(United Kingdom) Rupert Keegan	British Air Ferries Racing Team	March 743-Toyota
02/05/76	Hollies Trophy	(United Kingdom) Mallory Park	(New Zealand) Richard Hawkins	Dr. Joseph Ehrlich	Ehrlich ES5/6-Toyota
31/05/76	Volkswagen Silver Cup	(United Kingdom) Silverstone	(New Zealand) Brett Riley	Brett Riley/David Price Racing	Modus M1-Ford
26/09/76	Griffin Golden Helmet Trophy	(United Kingdom) Mallory Park	(United Kingdom) Stephen South	Dortmunder Union Bier/Bogarts of Birmingham	March 763-Toyota
24/10/76	Paul Nicholas Trophy	(United Kingdom) Brands Hatch	(Sweden) Conny Andersson	March Racing Ltd	March 763-Toyota
