= Alan Jones (racing driver) =

Australian racing driver (1946–2026)

Alan Jones MBE
- Jones at the 1980 Dutch Grand Prix
- Born: Alan Stanley Jones; 2 November 1946; Melbourne, Victoria, Australia
- Died: 5 November 2026 (aged 80); Sydney, New South Wales, Australia
- Spouses: Beverley (m. 1969; div. 1995) Amanda Butler-Davis (m. 2002)
- Children: 4, including Christian
- Parent: Stan Jones (father)

Formula One World Championship career
- Nationality: (Australia) Australian
- Active years: 1975–1981, 1983, 1985–1986
- Team(s): Privateer Hesketh, Hill, Surtees, Shadow, Williams, Arrows, Haas Lola
- Entries: 117 (116 starts)
- Championships: 1 (1980)
- Wins: 12
- Podiums: 24
- Career points: 199 (206) (Note: Up until 1990, not all points scored by a driver contributed to their final World Championship tally (see list of points scoring systems for more information). Numbers without parentheses are Championship points; numbers in parentheses are total points scored.)
- Pole positions: 6
- Fastest laps: 13
- First entry: 1975 Spanish Grand Prix
- First win: 1977 Austrian Grand Prix
- Last win: 1981 Caesars Palace Grand Prix
- Last entry: 1986 Australian Grand Prix

Alan Stanley Jones (2 November 1946 – 5 November 2026) was an Australian racing driver and broadcaster who competed in Formula One between 1975 and 1986. (Note: The exact years Jones competed in Formula One: 1975–1981, 1983, 1985–1986.) Jones won the Formula One World Drivers' Championship in 1980 with Williams, and won 12 Grands Prix across 10 seasons.

Jones was the first driver to win a Formula One World Championship with the Williams team, becoming the 1980 World Drivers' Champion and the second Australian to do so following triple World Champion Sir Jack Brabham. He competed in a total of 117 Grands Prix, winning 12 and achieving 24 podium finishes. Jones also won the 1978 Can-Am championship driving a Lola.

He was also the last Australian driver to win the Australian Grand Prix, winning the 1980 event at Calder Park Raceway, having lapped the field consisting mostly of Formula 5000 cars while he was driving his Formula One Championship winning Williams FW07B.

== Early life and career ==
Alan Stanley Jones was born on 2 November 1946 in Melbourne, Victoria. He was the son of Stan Jones, an Australian racing driver and winner of the 1959 Australian Grand Prix, and wanted to follow in his footsteps. He attended Xavier College. Jones initially worked in his father's Holden dealership while racing a Mini and a Cooper. The younger Jones left for Europe in 1967 to make a name for himself, but found that he could not afford even a Formula Ford drive. He therefore returned home but was back in the UK in 1970 and set about building his career in company with compatriot Brian McGuire. The two men bought and sold second-hand cars and Jones was eventually able to afford a Formula Three, Lotus 41 which he intended to adapt to Formula Two specification and take back to Australia to sell, in order to finance a season of Formula Three. However, the machine was written off in a testing accident at Brands Hatch in which Jones suffered a broken leg.

In late 1970, Jones signed with a firm for whom McGuire was working, designed to promote drivers' interests and was selected to compete in a series of races in Brazil. However, in his first two races the engine failed and in the third the gearbox broke, which meant the opportunity ended.

For 1971, Jones campaigned a Brabham BT 28 converted to BT35 specification, in Formula Three and had a moderately successful season which led to a series of tests for March at Silverstone. However, despite the success of the test, Jones was not offered a drive by March and for 1972, drove a GRD in Formula Three. Jones did enough that season to be kept on by GRD for the next year with a new sponsor and only lost the 1973 championship due to a misfiring engine in the last round at Brands Hatch. In 1974, Jones began the season in Formula Atlantic but felt it was a very amateurish effort, but a chance meeting with Harry Stiller led to a drive in the latter's March 74. At the end of the season, Jones made his F5000 debut for Stiller in the final round of the European Championship at Brands Hatch in a Chevron B24/28 owned by John MacDonald. It was planned to enter Formula 5000 for 1975. However, Stiller's initial plans fell through but after some delay, during which Jones was effectively unemployed, Stiller arranged to purchase a Formula One Hesketh 308 and signed Jones to drive the car.

== Formula One ==
=== 1975–1977: Hesketh, Hill, Surtees and Shadow ===
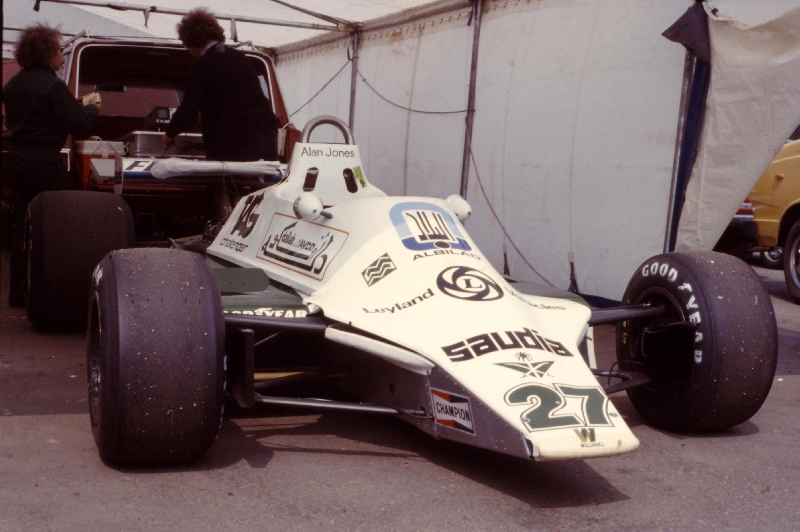
1980 championship winning car Williams FW07

Jones's first race was the 1975 Spanish Grand Prix at the fast Montjuïc circuit in the purchased Hesketh although the weekend turned out to be one of the most tragic in Formula One history when Rolf Stommelen's crash caused the death of five spectators. After four races in Formula One, the team ceased racing after Stiller moved abroad. However, Jones was named as a replacement for the injured Stommelen on Graham Hill's team. His best finish with Hill, in four races for the team, was fifth at the Nürburgring.

He earned his first full-time Formula One drive in 1976, in John Surtees's team. Jones's car was known for its infamous Durex sponsorship which led the BBC to refuse to cover Formula One races during the season. He managed several good finishes in the TS19, a fourth in Japan in the final race of the season being the best of them. Jones refused to drive for Surtees in 1977, preferring to sit out a season than continue with the team.

Jones was racing in the U.S. when he was signed by the Shadow team as a replacement for Tom Pryce, who had been killed in a freak racing accident in South Africa. He made the most of the opportunity and won at the Österreichring for his maiden victory, finishing seventh in that season's championship, with 22 points.

=== 1978–1981: Williams ===
By late 1977, Jones had caught the attention of Frank Williams as well as Enzo Ferrari. Ferrari had a meeting with him at Maranello, but in the end, Gilles Villeneuve got the drive. Williams, who was looking to rebuild his Formula One racing team, Williams Grand Prix, had struggled for success in its first years, and after he had restarted his team in 1977, Jones was signed for the following season.

As well as Williams, he also signed with Haas-Hall for 1978, and competed in a Lola 333CS in the Can-Am series, winning the title. Jones took nine poles in ten races but missed the Laguna Seca race due to a Formula One scheduling conflict, being stood in for by British driver Brian Redman who finished twelfth in the race. Of the nine races in which he competed, Jones won five (Atlanta, Mosport, Road America, Mid-Ohio, and Riverside). He finished second to Elliott Forbes-Robinson at Charlotte after hitting a chicane and losing a spark plug wire, retired through accident at St Jovite and lost a radiator at Watkins Glen. He finished third at Trois-Rivières after losing a shift fork and being stuck with only second and fifth gears on the tight road circuit. Jones ran one Can-Am race in 1979 (Mid-Ohio), where he and Keke Rosberg finished 1–2, with Jones winning his last Can-Am start.

For Williams, his best result that season was a second-place finish at Watkins Glen. Jones helped put the team on the Formula One map in 1979 using the Williams FW07, after winning four races in the span of five events near the end of the season, and finished third in the championship that year.

Jones won seven races in 1980, although the Spanish Grand Prix was later removed from the championship and the Australian Grand Prix was a non-championship race, so only five counted towards the Championship. Throughout the season, he had a car which consistently made the podium, and he achieved ten during the year. At the end of the season, he had beaten Nelson Piquet by 13 points in the standings, becoming Australia's first World Champion since Sir Jack Brabham. He had a good chance to repeat his success in 1981, but a very combative relationship with Carlos Reutemann led to an intense rivalry that possibly cost both drivers a chance at the championship. He finished four points behind Piquet for the championship and three behind Reutemann that year.

After winning the championship in 1980, Jones and Williams competed in the then non-championship Australian Grand Prix at Calder Park in November. Driving his FW07B against a field consisting mostly of Formula 5000's (and Bruno Giacomelli's Alfa Romeo 179), Jones, who had previously finished 4th in the race in 1977 (he was penalised 60 seconds for a jumped start, and officially finished just 20 seconds behind winner Warwick Brown showing that if not for the penalty he would have won by 40 seconds), joined his father Stan as a winner of the Australian Grand Prix.

From 1979 to 1981, Jones was awarded the No. 1 driver of the season by the editor of the Autocourse annual. During his championship year in 1980, the editor awarded Jones the No.1 slot not just because he was World Champion but because in the editor's opinion "Jones extracted every ounce of potential from the Williams FW07 -and more importantly, he did it consistently. All season Jones never gave anything less than his best." In 1981 despite missing the championship, the Autocourse editor still gave the No.1 driver award to Jones because "in 1981 Alan Jones was outstanding, his racing instincts sharper than ever, his driving aggressive and confident."

=== Later Formula One career: 1982–1986 ===
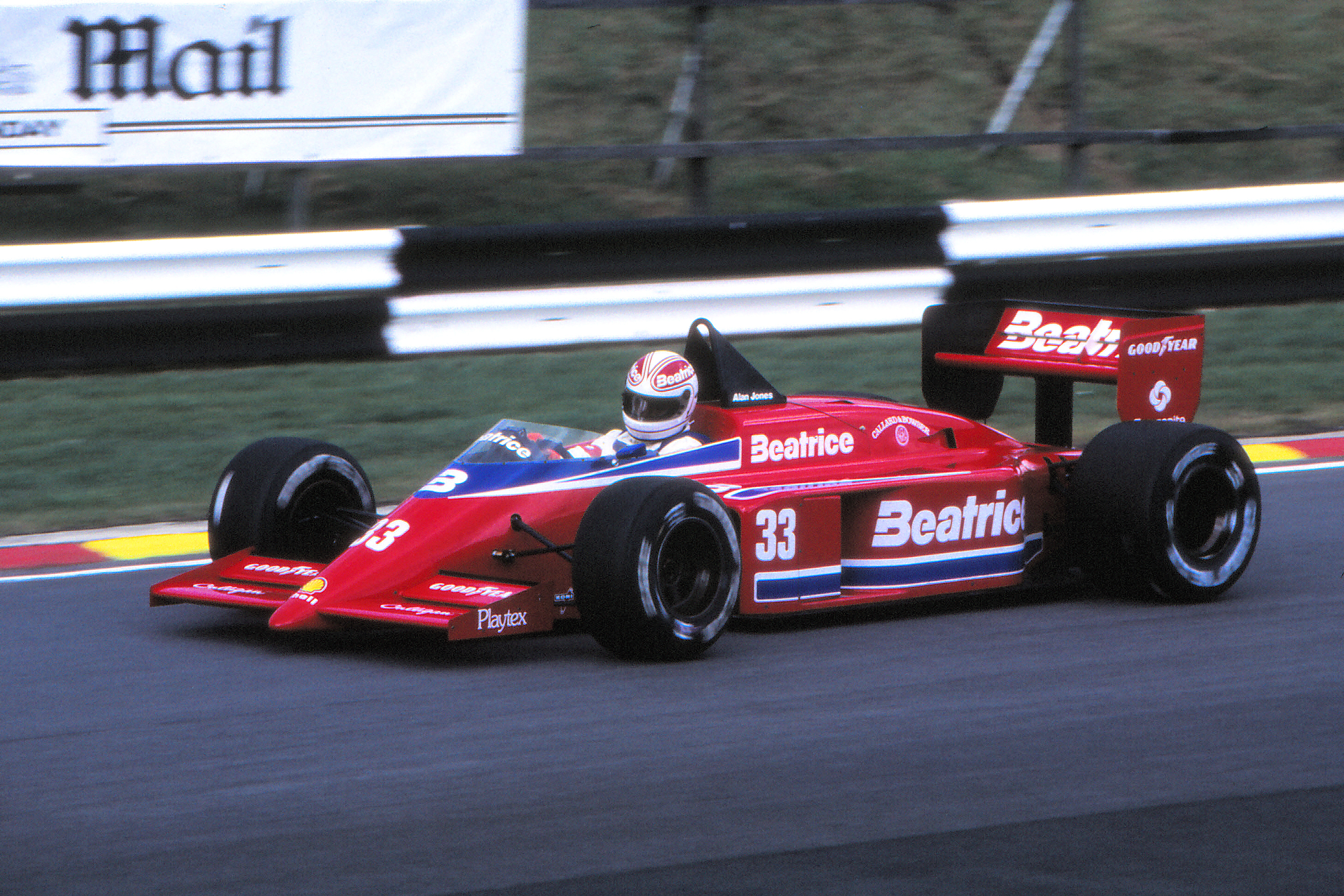
Jones during practice for the 1985 European Grand Prix

Jones announced his retirement after the 1981 season, which he managed to cap with a win in Las Vegas, but came out of retirement for a one-time drive with Arrows in 1983 at the United States Grand Prix West at Long Beach where he qualified 12th but retired after 58 laps through driver fatigue. A week later, he again drove for Arrows in the non-championship Race of Champions at Brands Hatch where he qualified and finished third behind reigning World Champion Keke Rosberg (Williams) and rookie American driver Danny Sullivan (Tyrrell). This was to be his last drive for the team, a bid to raise enough money to drive in the French Grand Prix the week after the Race of Champions failed which saw Arrows use its regular drivers Marc Surer and Chico Serra (whom Jones had replaced at Long Beach), instead.

During a 2012 Grand Prix Legends interview, Jones revealed that he had been contacted by Ferrari to drive for the team from mid-1982 after the death of Gilles Villeneuve and the injury forced retirement of Didier Pironi. As he was enjoying life back in Australia at the time, Jones did not give them an answer straight away and basically gave them the run around, a move he regretted as it was possible that, as the 1980 World Champion, Ferrari would have wanted to keep him for 1983 when he was looking to make a comeback, which would have seen him drive the car which won the Constructors' Championship in 1983. After taking too long to give them an answer, the Scuderia instead offered the drive to 1978 World Champion Mario Andretti who drove the last two races of the 1982 season at Monza and Caesars Palace.

Jones did not compete in Formula One during 1984, though he did drive some World Sportscar Championship races in 1983 and 1984. He made a full-time comeback to F1 late in 1985 when Team Haas was created and Jones became the first driver for the team. The American owned and sponsored team was based in England and made its debut at the 1985 Italian Grand Prix at Monza. Jones qualified the new Lola THL1 9.851 seconds slower than pole man Ayrton Senna in his Lotus-Renault and retired after only six laps with a blown engine. Jones was joined at Haas in 1986 by former Ferrari and Renault works driver Patrick Tambay. The comeback was unsuccessful more due to the Ford V6 engine's lack of power compared to its rivals from Honda, TAG-Porsche, BMW, Ferrari and Renault, than any lack of effort from the team and its drivers.

At the end of the 1986 season after the Haas team lost its sponsorship and ran out of money, Jones retired from Formula One for good having won 12 races, 6 pole positions and one World Championship.

== Post Formula One career ==
=== Sports and touring car racing ===
Jones's post Formula One career was initially spasmodic in nature. Briefly in demand for his services as a touring car co-driver, he raced occasionally in his home country's biggest endurance race, the Bathurst 1000 but success was elusive. In 1982, he attempted his first full season of racing, driving a Porsche 935 to dominate the 1982 Australian GT Championship. This championship included races against local touring car ace Peter Brock driving Bob Jane's 6.0 litre Chevrolet Monza. The duels between Australia's two biggest motorsport names at the time have often been regarded as some of the best racing seen domestically in Australia. Soon after he made his first failed comeback to Formula One. During 1982, he formed his own touring car team, combining the resources of V8 Ford Falcon driver Bob Morris and rotary Mazda RX-7 racer Barry Jones into a single two-car team but results were mixed and the exercise dissipated by the end of the season, though Jones and Jones did win the CRC 300 at Amaroo Park in a Mazda RX-7 (Alan Jones was to drive with Bob Morris in the Falcon in the Oran Park 250 endurance race, but elected after the race started to let Morris drive the 100 lap race solo. Morris went on to win the race).

1984 brought a top-six finish at the 24 Hours of Le Mans with Kremer Racing teamed with 1983 winner, fellow Aussie Vern Schuppan and Frenchman Jean-Pierre Jarier. From there he teamed again with Warren Cullen in a brand new Holden VK Commodore for the Sandown 500 at home in Melbourne where a troubled run saw them finish 12th, and then a top four finish at the Bathurst 1000. Cullen and Jones, the latter of whom drove the final stint in the race and required pain killing injections after having the steering wheel wrench out of his hands during practice which damaged ligaments in his elbow, were unlucky not to finish second, but a rear brake problem with the car saw him forced to use engine braking and thus more fuel than normal forced a late race stop for fuel (during the race the team discovered they'd made a mistake with their rear brake pad choice and when Jones pitted late it was found that the pads had worn away down to the brake discs). This allowed the second Holden Dealer Team VK Commodore of David Parsons and John Harvey to sneak into second and the Mazda RX-7 of Allan Moffat and Gregg Hansford to claim third.

Jones was quickly snapped up as teammate to Colin Bond on Bond's newly formed factory supported Network Alfa touring car team for the 1985 Australian Touring Car Championship driving an underpowered Alfa Romeo GTV6 in Australia's first full year using the international Group A touring car rules. After some giant killing performances in the early rounds of the championship, Jones abandoned his first serious ATCC campaign to make his second Formula One comeback with the Haas Lola team.

Jones joined Kremer Racing for the 1984 24 Hours of Le Mans where he would share a Porsche 956B with 1983 Le Mans winner (and fellow Aussie) Vern Schuppan along with former F1 driver Jean-Pierre Jarier. After dicing for the lead with the pole sitting Lancia LC2 of Bob Wollek and Alessandro Nannini for the first third of the race, damage caused when Schuppan was the innocent victim of a spinning Roger Dorchy, and finally a broken conrod, saw Jones finish his first 24 Hours of Le Mans start in 6th place. Jones had previously driven for the Kremer brothers when he and Schuppan drove a 956 to fifth place in the 1983 1000 km of Silversone. Later in 1984, Jones drove with Schuppan for the factory backed Rothmans Porsche team at the 1000 km of Sandown Park, the final round of the 1984 World Sportscar Championship and the first ever FIA World Championship race to be held in Australia. After Schuppan qualified the Porsche 956B third behind teammates Stefan Bellof and Jochen Mass, Jones started the race and got the jump on the West German pair and had the honour of leading the first lap of the first FIA World Championship race ever held in Australia. Jones and Schuppan eventually finished ninth, 12 laps down on Bellof and Derek Bell after numerous punctures.

On 20 September 1987, at SUGO, Jones won a round of the All Japan Touring Car Championship driving Toyota Team Tom's, Group A Toyota Supra MA70 Turbo. Unfortunately the factory backed Supra could not compete, even with the Private Ford Sierras, thus for the remaining two JGTC races he scored only one additional podium on 6 December at Suzuka where he finished third. After returning home again in 1987 his career did not pick up again until a competitive third placing at the 1988 Bathurst 1000 with Colin Bond's team in a Ford Sierra RS500, saw him signed up as full-time number two driver to Tony Longhurst in Longhurst's Frank Gardner run team to drive a Sierra in 1990. The Benson & Hedges sponsored Sierras were brutally fast but disappointingly fragile and results were again elusive. The team switched to BMW M3 Evolution's in 1991 saw the return of reliability at the cost of speed. Jones took the occasional podium result while Longhurst took two wins against the all-powerful Nissan Skyline R32 GT-R's. A switch to Glenn Seton Racing mid-season in 1992 brought improved results and race wins and he finished runner up to his team leader Glenn Seton as their V8 Ford Falcons dominated the 1993 Australian Touring Car Championship. Jones's reputation as a hard charger was shown in the 1993 ATCC when he was involved in a number of incidents, most notably pushing the Holden Commodore of Mark Skaife off the track at Symmons Plains Raceway before also doing the same to the Holden Racing Team's Commodore driven by Australia's 1987 500cc Grand Prix motorcycle World Champion Wayne Gardner less than half a lap later. Rule changes to make the Commodores more competitive saw the team's dominance fade over the next few years. The 1995 Bathurst 1000 looked to be a high point with a memorable 1–2 finish for their two cars fading into just a second for the car Jones shared with veteran Allan Grice, the pair finishing behind the Holden Commodore of ex-F1 driver Larry Perkins and Russell Ingall (Seton, leading by five seconds with just nine laps remaining, retired with a dead engine).

By this point, the team was sundering apart and Jones took the major sponsor (Philip Morris International) to form a new team with engineering brothers Ross and Jim Stone as partners, known commercially as Pack Leader Racing (the Pack Leader name came about as the use of the Peter Jackson cigarette brand was banned following the Australian Government's blanket ban on all cigarette advertising from 1 January 1996). Initially fast, the partnership was fading by 1997 and the Stones bought Jones out, re-badging the team as Stone Brothers Racing. Jones returned to race with Tony Longhurst's Longhurst Racing team again in 1998. By this time his form was fading. From 1999 onwards he no longer raced full-time, driving just the endurance races as a hired gun. His final race was with Dick Johnson Racing, driving into a seventh-placed finish at the 2002 Bathurst 1000.

=== CART ===
In August 1985, one month before his return to Formula One at the Italian Grand Prix, Jones's association with Team Haas owner Carl Haas saw him used as a substitute for injured Newman/Haas Racing driver (and 1978 World F1 Champion) Mario Andretti in a Champ Car World Series race at Road America in Wisconsin. In his only IndyCar start and showing he had lost none of the speed, skill and determination that took him to the World Championship, Jones drove Andretti's Lola T900-Cosworth to third place behind Jacques Villeneuve Sr. (winner) and Mario's son Michael Andretti (second).

=== A1 Grand Prix ===
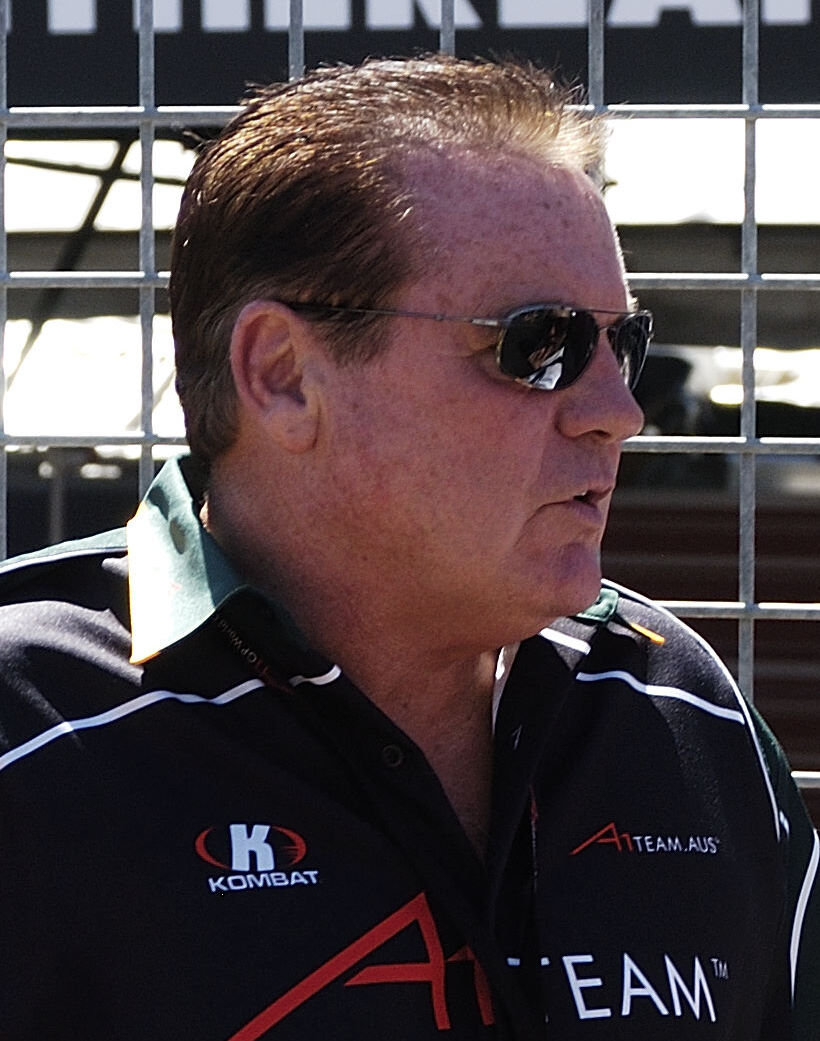
Jones at the Durban A1 GP in 2007

Jones then become involved in the Australian franchise of the A1 Grand Prix as Team Director in 2005 until the series demise in 2010.

=== Grand Prix Masters ===
Jones attempted to race in the Grand Prix Masters World Series at Kyalami in November 2005 but had to pull out before qualifying due to neck pains.

=== Media ===
After retiring from F1 for good after 1986, Jones became a commentator with Channel Nine as part of their Formula One coverage in Australia in 1987, a role which lasted until 2002 with change of network rights for Formula 1. This association with Nine saw him hosting F1 telecasts from Nine's Sydney studios working mostly with Darrell Eastlake, but sometimes with former Grand Prix motorcycle World Champion Barry Sheene on 500cc Grand Prix telecasts. Jones also worked as a pit reporter during the Australian Grand Prix where his relationships with those in F1 made it easier for him to obtain relevant information, and also as a pit reporter for Nine's broadcasts of the Australian Motorcycle Grand Prix.

In March 2013, Jones signed with Network Ten as a commentator for their Formula One coverage where he joined regular hosts Matthew White and former MotoGP rider Daryl Beattie.

=== Author ===
Jones's autobiography AJ: How Alan Jones Climbed to the top of Formula One, co-authored with motorsport writer Andrew Clarke, was released in August 2017 by Penguin Random House.

== Personal life and death ==
Jones separated from his wife Beverley in the late 1980s. In 1996, he began a relationship with Amanda Butler Davis, and the pair got married in 2002, around 20 months after the birth of their fraternal twin children.

Jones's adopted son Christian raced in various forms of motorsport in the 1990s and 2000s.

Jones died in Sydney, Australia, on 5 November 2026, at the age of 80, following a short battle with cancer. He died just three days after turning 80.

== Honours and awards ==
Jones was awarded the Hawthorn Memorial Trophy in 1979, 1980 and 1981. During 1980 he was also made a Member of the Order of the British Empire (MBE) for "service to motor racing" and was inducted into the Sport Australia Hall of Fame in 1989.

He and his father Stan, along with Graham and Damon Hill, and Keke and Nico Rosberg, are the only father/son combinations to ever win the Australian Grand Prix.

== Racing record ==
=== Career summary ===
Season	Series	Team	Races	Wins	Poles	F/laps	Podiums	Points	Position
1971	British Formula Three Shell Super Oil Championship		9	0	1	0	1	8	13th
1972	Forward Trust BARC Formula 3 Series	Australian Int. Racing Organisation	?	?	?	?	?	8	9th
1972	Lombard North Formula 3 Series	Alan Jones	?	?	?	?	?	9	11th
1972	Shellsport National Formula 3 Series	Australian Int. Racing Organisation	?	?	?	?	?	7	16th
1973	British Formula Three John Player European	DART	13	3	1	1	5	121	**2nd**
1973	Lombard North Formula 3 Series	DART	9	2	3	2	2	25	5th
1973	Forward Trust BARC Formula 3 Series	DART	6	1	1	1	2	19	7th
1974	British Formula Atlantic Series	Harry Stiller Racing	9	3	2	?	5	97	4th
1974	British Formula Atlantic Championship	Harry Stiller Racing	8	1	4	?	3	41	**2nd**
1974	European Formula 5000 Championship	Custom Made Harry Stiller Racing	1	0	0	0	0	0	NC
1974	World Sportscar Championship	Victoria Sporting Club	1	0	0	0	0	N/A	NC
1975	European Formula 5000 Championship	RAM Racing	9	2	2	5	4	64	7th
1975	Formula One	Custom Made Harry Stiller Racing / Rob Walkers / Custom Made Racing	4	0	0	0	0	2	17th
1975	Formula One	Embassy Racing with Graham Hill	4	0	0	0	0	2	17th
1975	World Sportscar Championship	Steward Chubb Racing	4	0	0	0	0	N/A	NC
1976	Formula One	Durex Team Surtees / Theodore Racing	14	0	0	0	0	7	15th
1976	SCCA Continental Championship	Theodore Racing	6	2	0	1	2	96	4th
1976	Shellsport International Series		2	1	1	1	1	24	16th
1976	Macau Grand Prix	Theodore Racing	1	0	0	1	0	N/A	NC
1977	Formula One	Ambrosio Tabatip Shadow Racing	14	1	0	0	2	22	7th
1977	Rothmans International Series	Theodore Racing / Bill Patterson Motors	4	1	1	3	1	14	**3rd**
1977	Can-Am Challenge Cup	Theodore Racing / Bill Patterson Motors	3	0	0	0	0	0	NC
1977	European Formula Two	Fred Opert Racing	1	0	0	0	0	0	NC
1978	Formula One	Williams Grand Prix Engineering	16	0	0	2	1	11	11th
1978	Can-Am Challenge Cup	Haas-Hall Racing	9	5	9	9	7	2712	**1st**
1979	Formula One	Albilad Williams Racing Team	15	4	3	1	5	40	**3rd**
1979	BMW M1 Procar Championship	BMW Motorsport	7	0	5	0	1	27	10th
1979	Can-Am Challenge Cup	Carl Hall Racing	2	1	0	1	1	9	6th
1980	Formula One	Albilad Williams Racing Team	14	5	3	5	10	67	**1st**
1980	BMW M1 Procar Championship	BMW Motorsport	9	0	0	0	3	77	**2nd**
1981	Formula One	Albilad Williams Racing Team / TAG Williams Team	15	2	0	5	6	46	**3rd**
1982	Australian GT Championship	Porsche Cars Australia	16	16	8	15	16	81	**1st**
1982	Australian Drivers' Championship	Alan Jones Racing	1	0	0	1	1	6	8th
1983	Formula One	Arrows Racing Team	1	0	0	0	0	0	NC
1983	World Sportscar Championship	Porsche Kremer Racing	1	0	0	0	0	8	39th
1983	Australian Drivers' Championship	Goold Motorsport	1	0	0	1	1	6	6th
1984	Australian Endurance Championship	Warren Cullen Racing	2	0	0	0	0	29.5	10th
1984	Australian Endurance Championship	Network Alfa	1	0	0	0	0	29.5	10th
1984	World Sportscar Championship	Porsche Kremer Racing	1	0	0	0	0	9	52nd
1984	World Sportscar Championship	Rothmans Porsche	1	0	0	0	0	9	52nd
1985	Australian Touring Car Championship	Network Alfa	7	0	0	0	1	108	8th
1985	Formula One	Team Haas (USA) Ltd	3	0	0	0	0	0	NC
1985	CART PPG Indy Car World Series	Newman/Haas Racing	1	0	0	0	1	14	23rd
1985	World Sportscar Championship	TWR Jaguar	1	0	0	0	0	0	NC
1986	Formula One	Team Haas (USA) Ltd	16	0	0	0	0	4	12th
1987	All-Japan Sports Prototype Championship	Toyota Team Tom's	3	1	0	0	2	12	22nd
1987	World Sportscar Championship	Toyota Team Tom's	2	0	0	0	0	0	NC
1988	Asia-Pacific Touring Car Championship	Caltex CXT Racing Team	3	0	0	0	1	49	**2nd**
1990	Australian Touring Car Championship	Benson & Hedges Racing	8	0	1	4	1	22	9th
1990	Australian Endurance Championship	Benson & Hedges Racing	3	0	0	0	0	6	24th
1991	Australian Touring Car Championship	Benson & Hedges Racing	9	0	0	1	2	70	4th
1991	Australian Endurance Championship	Benson & Hedges Racing	2	0	0	0	0	15	=7th
1991	Nissan Mobil 500 Series	Benson & Hedges Racing	2	0	0	0	0	12	=6th
1992	Australian Touring Car Championship	Benson & Hedges Racing	18	0	0	0	2	143	7th
1993	Australian Touring Car Championship	Peter Jackson Racing	18	3	0	?	8	148	**2nd**
1994	Australian Touring Car Championship	Peter Jackson Racing	20	1	?	?	8	177	4th
1995	Winfield Triple Challenge	Peter Jackson Racing	2	1	0	2	1	39	**1st**
1995	Australian Touring Car Championship	Peter Jackson Racing	20	0	0	0	3	133	8th
1995	Australian GT Production Car Series	Mazda Motorsport	2	0	0	0	0	14	14th
1996	Australian Touring Car Championship	Pack Leader Racing	30	0	?	?	5	180	8th
1996	Mobil New Zealand Sprints	Pack Leader Racing	4	0	?	?	1	26	11th
1997	Australian Touring Car Championship	Alan Jones Racing	26	1	0	?	3	318	11th
1998	Australian Touring Car Championship	Longhurst Racing	23	0	0	?	?	261	16th
1999	Shell Championship Series	Paul Little Racing	2	0	0	0	0	96	62nd
2000	Shell Championship Series	Paul Little Racing	2	0	0	0	0	0	NC
2001	Shell Championship Series	Paul Little Racing	2	0	0	0	0	344	44th
2002	V8 Supercar Championship Series	Shell Helix Racing	2	0	0	0	0	136	38th

=== Complete World Sportscar Championship results ===
(key) (Races in bold indicate pole position) (Races in italics indicate fastest lap)

Year	Entrant	Class	Chassis	Engine	1	2	3	4	5	6	7	8	9	10	11	Pos.	Pts
1974	Victoria Sporting Club	S 2.0	Chevron B21	Ford Cosworth FVC 1.8 L4	MNZ	SPA	NÜR	IMO	LMS	ÖST	GLN	LEC	BRH; Ret	KYA		(Note: No drivers' Championship.)	
1975	Steward Chubb Racing	S 2.0	Lola T294	Ford Cosworth 1.8 L4	DAY	MUG	DIJ; 12	MNZ; 14	SPA; Ret	PER	NÜR; 15	ÖST	GLN				
1983	Porsche Kremer Racing	C	Porsche 956	Porsche Type 935/76 2.6 F6 t	MNZ	SIL; 5	NÜR	LMS	SPA	FUJ	KYA					38th	8
1984	Porsche Kremer Racing	C1	Porsche 956B	Porsche Type 935/76 2.6 F6 t	MNZ	SIL	LMS; 6	NÜR	BRH	MOS	SPA	IMO	FUJ	KYA		49th	9
1984	Rothmans Porsche	C1	Porsche 956	Porsche Type 935/76 2.6 F6 t											SAN; 8	49th	9
1985	TWR Jaguar	C1	Jaguar XJR-6	Jaguar 6.2 V12	MUG	MNZ	SIL	LMS	HOC	MOS	SPA	BRH; Ret	FUJ	SHA		NC	0
1987	Toyota Team Tom's	C1	Toyota 87C	Toyota 3S-GTM 2.1 L4 t	JAR	JER	MNZ	SIL	LMS; Ret	NOR	BRH	NÜR	SPA	FUJ; Ret		NC	0

Footnotes

=== Complete European F5000 Championship results ===
(key) (Races in bold indicate pole position; races in italics indicate fastest lap.)

Year	Entrant	Chassis	Engine	1	2	3	4	5	6	7	8	9	10	11	12	13	14	15	16	17	18	Pos.	Pts
1974	Custom Made Harry Stiller Racing	Chevron B24/B28	Chevrolet 5.0 V8	BRH	MAL	SIL	OUL	BRH	ZOL	THR	ZAN	MUG	MNZ	MAL	MON	THR	BRH	OUL	SNE	MAL	BRH; Ret	NC	0
1975	RAM Racing	Chevron B28	Chevrolet 5.0 V8	BRH	OUL	BRH	SIL	ZOL	ZAN; Ret	THR												7th	64
1975	RAM Racing	March 75A	Ford GAA 3.4 V6								SNE; DNS	MAL; Ret	THR; 3	BRH; 1	**OUL**; Ret	**SIL**; 1	SNE; Ret	MAL; 3	BRH; NC			7th	64

=== Complete Formula One World Championship results ===
(key) (Races in bold indicate pole position; races in italics indicate fastest lap.)

Year	Entrant	Chassis	Engine	1	2	3	4	5	6	7	8	9	10	11	12	13	14	15	16	17	WDC	Pts
1975	Custom Made Harry Stiller Racing	Hesketh 308B	Ford Cosworth DFV 3.0 V8	ARG	BRA	RSA	ESP; Ret	MON; Ret													17th	2
1975	Rob Walkers Custom Made Racing	Hesketh 308B	Ford Cosworth DFV 3.0 V8						BEL; Ret	SWE; 11											17th	2
1975	Embassy Racing with Graham Hill	Hill GH1	Ford Cosworth DFV 3.0 V8								NED; 13	FRA; 16	GBR; 10	GER; 5	AUT	ITA	USA				17th	2
1976	Durex Team Surtees	Surtees TS19	Ford Cosworth DFV 3.0 V8	BRA	RSA	USW; NC	ESP; 9	BEL; 5	MON; Ret	SWE; 13	FRA; Ret	GBR; 5	GER; 10	AUT; Ret	NED; 8	ITA; 12	CAN; 16	USA; 8			15th	7
1976	Durex Team Surtees / Theodore Racing	Surtees TS19	Ford Cosworth DFV 3.0 V8																JPN; 4		15th	7
1977	Ambrosio Tabatip Shadow Racing	Shadow DN8	Ford Cosworth DFV 3.0 V8	ARG	BRA	RSA	USW; Ret	ESP; Ret	MON; 6	BEL; 5	SWE; 17	FRA; Ret	GBR; 7	GER; Ret	AUT; 1	NED; Ret	ITA; 3	USA; Ret	CAN; 4	JPN; 4	7th	22
1978	Williams Grand Prix Engineering	Williams FW06	Ford Cosworth DFV 3.0 V8	ARG; Ret	BRA; 11	RSA; 4	USW; 7	MON; Ret	BEL; 10	ESP; 8	SWE; Ret	FRA; 5	GBR; Ret	GER; Ret	AUT; Ret	NED; Ret	ITA; 13	USA; 2	CAN; 9		11th	11
1979	Albilad-Saudia Racing Team	Williams FW06	Ford Cosworth DFV 3.0 V8	ARG; 9	BRA; Ret	RSA; Ret	USW; 3														**3rd**	**40 (43)**
1979	Albilad-Saudia Racing Team	Williams FW07	Ford Cosworth DFV 3.0 V8					ESP; Ret	BEL; Ret	MON; Ret	FRA; 4	**GBR**; Ret	GER; 1	AUT; 1	NED; 1	ITA; 9	**CAN**; 1	**USA**; Ret			**3rd**	**40 (43)**
1980	Albilad Williams Racing Team	Williams FW07B	Ford Cosworth DFV 3.0 V8	**ARG**; 1	BRA; 3	RSA; Ret	USW; Ret	**BEL**; 2	MON; Ret	FRA; 1	GBR; 1	**GER**; 3	AUT; 2	NED; 11	ITA; 2	CAN; 1	USA; 1				**1st**	**67 (71)**
1981	Albilad Williams Racing Team	Williams FW07C	Ford Cosworth DFV 3.0 V8	USW; 1	BRA; 2	ARG; 4	SMR; 12	BEL; Ret	MON; 2												**3rd**	**46**
1981	TAG Williams Team	Williams FW07C	Ford Cosworth DFV 3.0 V8							ESP; 7	FRA; 17	GBR; Ret	GER; 11	AUT; 4	NED; 3	ITA; 2	CAN; Ret	CPL; 1			**3rd**	**46**
1983	Arrows Racing Team	Arrows A6	Ford Cosworth DFV 3.0 V8	BRA	USW; Ret	FRA	SMR	MON	BEL	DET	CAN	GBR	GER	AUT	NED	ITA	EUR	RSA			NC	0
1985	Team Haas (USA) Ltd	Lola THL1	Hart 415T 1.5 L4 t	BRA	POR	SMR	MON	CAN	DET	FRA	GBR	GER	AUT	NED	ITA; Ret	BEL	EUR; Ret	RSA; DNS	AUS; Ret		NC	0
1986	Team Haas (USA) Ltd	Lola THL1	Hart 415T 1.5 L4 t	BRA; Ret	ESP; Ret																12th	4
1986	Team Haas (USA) Ltd	Lola THL2	Ford TEC 1.5 V6 t			SMR; Ret	MON; Ret	BEL; 11	CAN; 10	DET; Ret	FRA; Ret	GBR; Ret	GER; 9	HUN; Ret	AUT; 4	ITA; 6	POR; Ret	MEX; Ret	AUS; Ret		12th	4

=== Non-championship Formula One results ===
(key) (Races in bold indicate pole position; races in italics indicate fastest lap.)

Year	Entrant	Chassis	Engine	1	2	3
1975	Custom Made Harry Stiller Racing	Hesketh 308B	Ford Cosworth DFV 3.0 V8	ROC	INT; 7	SUI
1976	Durex Team Surtees	Surtees TS19	Ford Cosworth DFV 3.0 V8	ROC; 2	INT; 8	
1979	Albilad-Saudia Racing Team	Williams FW07	Ford Cosworth DFV 3.0 V8	ROC	GNM; 1	DIN
1980	Albilad Williams Racing Team	Williams FW07B	Ford Cosworth DFV 3.0 V8	ESP; 1	**AUS**; 1	
1981	TAG Williams Team	Williams FW07C	Ford Cosworth DFV 3.0 V8	RSA; Ret		
1983	Arrows Racing Team	Arrows A6	Ford Cosworth DFV 3.0 V8	ROC; 3		

=== Complete Shellsport International Series results ===
(key) (Races in bold indicate pole position; races in italics indicate fastest lap.)

Year	Entrant	Chassis	Engine	1	2	3	4	5	6	7	8	9	10	11	12	13	Pos.	Pts
1976	Theodore Racing Hong Kong	Lola T330	Chevrolet 5.0 V8	MAL	SNE	OUL; Ret	**BRH**; 1	THR	BRH	MAL	SNE	BRH	THR	OUL	BRH	BRH	16th	22

=== American open-wheel racing ===
(key) (Races in bold indicate pole position; races in italics indicate fastest lap.)

==== USAC Championship Car ====
Year	Team	Chassis	Engine	1	2	3	4	5	6	7	8	9	10	11	12	13	14	Pos.	Pts
1977	Theodore Racing	McLaren M16C	Offy 159 ci t	ONT; DNS	PHX	TWS	TRE	INDY	MIL	POC	MOS	MCH	TWS	MIL	ONT	MCH	PHX	NA	–

==== CART PPG Indy Car World Series ====
Year	Team	No.	Chassis	Engine	1	2	3	4	5	6	7	8	9	10	11	12	13	14	15	Pos.	Pts
1985	Newman/Haas Racing	3	Lola T900	Cosworth DFX V8 t	LBH	INDY	MIL	POR	MEA	CLE	MCH	ROA; 3	POC	MOH	SAN	MCH	LAG	PHX	MIA	23rd	14

=== Complete Can-Am Challenge Cup results ===
(key) (Races in bold indicate pole position) (Races in italics indicate fastest lap)

Year	Entrant	Chassis	Engine	1	2	3	4	5	6	7	8	9	10	DC	Pts
1977	Phoenix Racing	Shadow DN4B	Dodge	MTT	LAG	GLN	ROA	MOH	MOS; 25	CTR	SPR; 11	RIR; 33		NC	0
1978	Carl A. Haas Racing Team	Lola T333CS	Chevrolet	**ROA**; 1	**CMS**; 2	**MOH**; 1	**MTT**; Ret	**GLN**; 15	**ROA**; 1	**MOS**; 1	**CTR**; 3	LAG	**RIR**; 1	1st	2712
1979	Carl A. Haas Racing Team	Lola T333CS	Chevrolet	ROA	CMS	MOS	MOH; 1	GLN	ROA	BIR	CTR	LAG	RIR; Ret	6th	9

=== Complete European Formula Two Championship results ===
(key) (Races in bold indicate pole position; races in italics indicate fastest lap)

Year	Entrant	Chassis	Engine	1	2	3	4	5	6	7	8	9	10	11	12	13	Pos.	Pts
1977	Fred Opert Racing	Chevron B40	Hart	SIL	THR	HOC	NÜR; 19	VAL	PAU	MUG	ROU	NOG	PER	MIS	EST	DON	NC	0

=== Complete BMW M1 Procar Championship results ===
(key) (Races in bold indicate pole position; races in italics indicate fastest lap)

Year	Entrant	1	2	3	4	5	6	7	8	9	DC	Pts
1979	BMW Motorsport	ZOL	MCO	DIJ; 2	**SIL**; 5	**HOC**; Ret	**ÖST**; Ret	**ZAN**; 8	**MNZ**; Ret		10th	27
1980	BMW Motorsport	DON; 3	AVS; 7	MCO; 4	NOR; 5	BRH; 2	HOC; Ret	ÖST; 8	ZAN; 4	IMO; 2	**2nd**	**77**

=== Complete 24 Hours of Le Mans results ===
Year	Team	Co-drivers	Car	Class	Laps	Pos.	Class pos.
1984	(West Germany) Porsche Kremer Racing	(Australia) Vern Schuppan (France) Jean-Pierre Jarier	Porsche 956B	C1	337	6th	6th
1987	(Japan) Toyota Team Tom's	(United Kingdom) Geoff Lees (Sweden) Eje Elgh	Toyota 87C	C1	19	DNF	DNF

=== V8 Supercar Championship results ===
(key) (Races in bold indicate pole position) (Races in italics indicate fastest lap)

Year	Team	Car	1	2	3	4	5	6	7	8	9	10	11	12	13	14	15	16	17	18	19	20	21	22	23	24	25	26	27	28	29	30	31	32	33	Pos.	Pts
1985	Network Alfa	Alfa Romeo GTV6	WIN; R1; 4	SAN; R2; 4	SYM; R3; 7	BAR; R4; 6	ADE; R5; 16	CAL; R6; 4	SRF; R7; 7	LAK; R8; DNS	AMA; R9	ORA; R10																								8th	108
1990	Benson & Hedges Racing	Ford Sierra RS500	**AMA**; **R1**; 8	SYM; R2; 12	PHI; R3; 6	WIN; R4; 3	LAK; R5; Ret	MAL; R6; Ret	BAR; R7; 10	ORA; R8; Ret																										9th	22
1991	Benson & Hedges Racing	BMW M3 Evolution	SAN; R1; 6	SYM; R2; 9	BAR; R3; 5	LAK; R4; 5	WIN; R5; 5	AMA; R6; 5	MAL; R7; 10	LAK; R8; 2	ORA; R9; 2																									4th	70
1992	Benson & Hedges Racing	BMW M3 Evolution	AMA; R1; 9	AMA; R2; 11	SAN; R3; 14	SAN; R4; Ret	SYM; R5; 7	SYM; R6; 9	WIN; R7; 7	WIN; R8; 5	LAK; R9; 4	LAK; R10; 3	EAS; R11; 7	EAS; R12; 5	MAL; R13; 7	MAL; R14; 7	BAR; R15; 8	BAR; R16; 4	ORA; R17; 4	ORA; R18; 3																7th	143
1993	Peter Jackson Racing	Ford EB Falcon	AMA; R1	AMA; R2; 8	AMA; R3; 6	SYM; R4; 1	**SYM**; **R5**; 1	PHI; R6; 4	PHI; R7; 2	**LAK**; **R8**; 2	LAK; R9; 1	WIN; R10; Ret	WIN; R11; 5	EAS; R12; 3	EAS; R13; 2	MAL; R14; Ret	MAL; R15; 5	BAR; R16; 9	BAR; R17; 6	ORA; R18; 8	ORA; R19; 3															2nd	148
1994	Peter Jackson Racing	Ford EB Falcon	AMA; R1; 18	AMA; R2; 20	SAN; R3; 3	SAN; R4; 7	SYM; R5; 13	SYM; R6; 7	**PHI**; **R7**; 3	PHI; R8; 10	LAK; R9; 10	LAK; R10; Ret	WIN; R11; 2	WIN; R12; 3	EAS; R13; 7	EAS; R14; 2	MAL; R15; 5	MAL; R16; 4	BAR; R17; 3	BAR; R18; 1	ORA; R19; Ret	ORA; R20; 3														5th	177
1995	Peter Jackson Racing	Ford EF Falcon	SAN; R1; 13	SAN; R2; 12	SYM; R3; 5	SYM; R4; 11	BAT; R5; 7	BAT; R6; 7	PHI; R7; 2	PHI; R8; 2	LAK; R9; Ret	LAK; R10; Ret	WIN; R11; 5	WIN; R12; 5	EAS; R13; 4	EAS; R14; 2	MAL; R15; 6	MAL; R16; 7	BAR; R17; Ret	BAR; R18; Ret	ORA; R19; Ret	ORA; R20; 4														8th	133
1996	Alan Jones Racing	Ford EF Falcon	EAS; R1; 8	EAS; R2; 14	EAS; R3; 5	SAN; R4; 10	SAN; R5; 11	SAN; R6; Ret	BAT; R7; 9	BAT; R8; 8	BAT; R9; 8	SYM; R10; 4	SYM; R11; DNS	SYM; R12; 9	PHI; R13; 6	PHI; R14; 10	PHI; R15; 2	CAL; R16; 18	CAL; R17; Ret	CAL; R18; 19	LAK; R19; 6	LAK; R20; 4	LAK; R21; 2	BAR; R22; 3	BAR; R23; 13	BAR; R24; 3	MAL; R25; 7	MAL; R26; 4	MAL; R27; 3	ORA; R28; 7	ORA; R29; 9	ORA; R30; 4				8th	180
1997	Alan Jones Racing	Ford EL Falcon	CAL; R1; 5	CAL; R2; 5	CAL; R3; 5	PHI; R4; 6	PHI; R5; 6	PHI; R6; 3	SAN; R7; Ret	SAN; R8; 10	SAN; R9; 8	SYM; R10; Ret	SYM; R11; 14	SYM; R12; Ret	WIN; R13	WIN; R14	WIN; R15	EAS; R16; 7	EAS; R17; Ret	EAS; R18; Ret	LAK; R19; Ret	LAK; R20; 9	LAK; R21; 8	BAR; R22; 6	BAR; R23; 4	BAR; R24; 4	MAL; R25; 7	MAL; R26; Ret	MAL; R27; DNS	ORA; R28; 3	ORA; R29; 1	**ORA**; **R30**; Ret				11th	318
1998	Longhurst Racing	Ford EL Falcon	SAN; R1	SAN; R2	SAN; R3	SYM; R4	SYM; R5	SYM; R6	LAK; R7; 9	LAK; R8; 7	LAK; R9; 20	PHI; R10; 13	PHI; R11; 13	PHI; R12; 6	WIN; R13; 13	WIN; R14; Ret	WIN; R15; 13	MAL; R16; 10	MAL; R17; 15	MAL; R18; Ret	BAR; R19; 13	BAR; R20; 12	BAR; R21; 24	CAL; R22; 16	CAL; R23; 16	CAL; R24; C	HDV; R25; 10	HDV; R26; Ret	HDV; R27; 10	ORA; R28; 23	ORA; R29; 14	ORA; R30; Ret				16th	261
1999	Paul Little Racing	Ford AU Falcon	EAS; R1	EAS; R2	EAS; R3	ADE; R4	BAR; R5	BAR; R6	BAR; R7	PHI; R8	PHI; R9	PHI; R10	HDV; R11	HDV; R12	HDV; R13	SAN; R14	SAN; R15	SAN; R16	QLD; R17	QLD; R18	QLD; R19	CAL; R20	CAL; R21	CAL; R22	SYM; R23	SYM; R24	SYM; R25	WIN; R26	WIN; R27	WIN; R28	ORA; R29	ORA; R30	ORA; R31	QLD; R32; 17	BAT; R33; Ret	62nd	96
2000	Paul Little Racing	Ford AU Falcon	PHI; R1	PHI; R2	BAR; R3	BAR; R4	BAR; R5	ADE; R6	ADE; R7	EAS; R8	EAS; R9	EAS; R10	HDV; R11	HDV; R12	HDV; R13	CAN; R14	CAN; R15	CAN; R16	QLD; R17	QLD; R18	QLD; R19	WIN; R20	WIN; R21	WIN; R22	ORA; R23	ORA; R24	ORA; R25	CAL; R26	CAL; R27	CAL; R28	QLD; R29; Ret	SAN; R30	SAN; R31	SAN; R32	BAT; R33; Ret	NC	0
2001	Paul Little Racing	Ford AU Falcon	PHI; R1	PHI; R2	ADE; R3	ADE; R4	EAS; R5	EAS; R6	HDV; R7	HDV; R8	HDV; R9	CAN; R10	CAN; R11	CAN; R12	BAR; R13	BAR; R14	BAR; R15	CAL; R16	CAL; R17	CAL; R18	ORA; R19	ORA; R20	QLD; R21; 17	WIN; R22	WIN; R23	BAT; R24; 15	PUK; R25	PUK; R26	PUK; R27	SAN; R28	SAN; R29	SAN; R30				44th	344
2002	Shell Helix Racing	Ford AU Falcon	ADE; R1	ADE; R2	PHI; R3	PHI; R4	EAS; R5	EAS; R6	EAS; R7	HDV; R8	HDV; R9	HDV; R10	CAN; R11	CAN; R12	CAN; R13	BAR; R14	BAR; R15	BAR; R16	ORA; R17	ORA; R18	WIN; R19	WIN; R20	QLD; R21; 8	BAT; R22; 7	SUR; R23	SUR; R24	PUK; R25	PUK; R26	PUK; R27	SAN; R28	SAN; R29					38th	136

=== Complete Asia-Pacific Touring Car Championship results ===
(key) (Races in bold indicate pole position; races in italics indicate fastest lap.)

Year	Team	Car	1	2	3	4	Pos.	Pts
1988	Caltex CXT Racing Team	Ford Sierra RS500	BAT; 3	WEL; 4	PUK; Ret	FUJ	2nd	49

=== Complete Bathurst 1000 results ===
Year	Team	Co-drivers	Car	Class	Laps	Pos.	Class pos.
1981	(Australia) Warren Cullen	(Australia) Warren Cullen	Holden VC Commodore	8 Cylinder & Over	48	DNF	DNF
1982	(Australia) Alan Jones	(Australia) Barry Jones	Mazda RX-7	Group C	88	DNF	DNF
1984	(Australia) K-Mart Auto Racing	(Australia) Warren Cullen	Holden VK Commodore SS	Group C	161	4th	4th
1988	(Australia) Caltex CXT Racing Team	(Australia) Colin Bond	Ford Sierra RS500	A	158	**3rd**	**3rd**
1989	(Australia) Benson & Hedges Racing	(New Zealand) Denny Hulme (Australia) Tony Longhurst	Ford Sierra RS500	A	158	5th	5th
1990	(Australia) Benson & Hedges Racing	(New Zealand) Denny Hulme	Ford Sierra RS500	1	65	DNF	DNF
1991	(Australia) Benson & Hedges Racing	(Australia) Tony Longhurst	BMW M3 Evolution	2	138	DNF	DNF
1992	(Australia) Peter Jackson Racing	(Australia) Glenn Seton	Ford EB Falcon	A	84	DNF	DNF
1993	(Australia) Peter Jackson Racing	(Australia) Glenn Seton	Ford EB Falcon	A	147	DNF	DNF
1994	(Australia) Peter Jackson Racing	(Australia) David Parsons	Ford EB Falcon	A	52	DNF	DNF
1995	(Australia) Peter Jackson Racing	(Australia) Allan Grice	Ford EF Falcon		161	**2nd**	**2nd**
1996	(Australia) Pack Leader Racing	(Australia) Allan Grice	Ford EF Falcon		25	DNF	DNF
1997*	(United Kingdom) Williams Renault Dealer Racing	(Australia) Graham Moore	Renault Laguna		38	DNF	DNF
1997	(Australia) Alan Jones Racing	(United States) Scott Pruett (Australia) Jason Bright	Ford EL Falcon	L1	153	12th	7th
1998	(Australia) Longhurst Racing	(Australia) Adam Macrow	Ford EL Falcon	OC	58	DNF	DNF
1999	(Australia) Paul Little Racing	(Australia) Anthony Tratt	Ford AU Falcon		147	DNF	DNF
2000	(Australia) Toll Racing	(Australia) Anthony Tratt	Ford AU Falcon		150	DNF	DNF
2001	(Australia) Paul Little Racing	(Australia) Anthony Tratt	Ford AU Falcon		158	15th	15th
2002	(Australia) Shell Helix Racing	(Australia) Greg Ritter	Ford AU Falcon		161	7th	7th

- Super Touring race

=== Complete Sandown 500 results ===
Year	Team	Co-drivers	Car	Class	Laps	Pos.	Class pos.
1982	(Australia) Seiko Watches		Mazda RX-7	D		DNF	DNF
1984	(Australia) Kmart Auto Racing	(Australia) Warren Cullen	Holden VK Commodore	Over 3000cc	102	12th	8th
1988	(Australia) Caltex CXT Racing Team	(Australia) Colin Bond	Ford Sierra RS500	A	–	DNS	DNS
1989	(Australia) Benson & Hedges Racing	(New Zealand) Denny Hulme	Ford Sierra RS500	A	87	DNF	DNF
1991	(Australia) Benson & Hedges Racing	(Australia) Peter Fitzgerald	BMW M3 Evolution	B	155	2nd	1st
1992	(Australia) Peter Jackson Racing	(Australia) Glenn Seton	Ford EB Falcon	3A (1993)	18	DNF	DNF
1993	(Australia) Peter Jackson Racing	(Australia) Glenn Seton	Ford EB Falcon	A	124	DNF	DNF
1994	(Australia) Peter Jackson Racing	(Australia) David Parsons	Ford EB Falcon	V8	147	DNF	DNF
1995	(Australia) Peter Jackson Racing	(Australia) Allan Grice	Ford EF Falcon		161	**2nd**	**2nd**
1996	(Australia) Pack Leader Racing	(Australia) Allan Grice	Ford EF Falcon		110	DNF	DNF
1997	(Australia) Alan Jones Racing	(Australia) Jason Bright	Ford EL Falcon		157	**3rd**	**3rd**
1998	(Australia) Longhurst Racing	(Australia) Adam Macrow	Ford EL Falcon	OC	0	DNF	DNF

=== Complete Bathurst / Eastern Creek 12 Hour results ===
Year	Team	Co-drivers	Car	Class	Laps	Pos.	Class pos.
1992	BMW Australia Pty Ltd	(New Zealand) Neville Crichton (Australia) Tony Longhurst	BMW M5	C	251	**2nd**	**1st**
1993	Mazda Australia	(Australia) Garry Waldon	Mazda RX-7	T	263	**1st**	**1st**
1994	(New Zealand) Neville Crichton	(New Zealand) Neville Crichton (Australia) John Bowe	BMW M3	X	120	DNF	DNF
1995	(Australia) Terry Bosnjak	(Australia) Terry Bosnjak	Mazda RX-7 SP	X	94	DNF	DNF

=== Complete Grand Prix Masters results ===
(key)

Year	Team	Chassis	Engine	1
2005	Team Golden Palace	Delta Motorsport GPM	Nicholson McLaren 3.5 V8	RSA; DNS

== Notes ==
Sporting positions
Preceded by Patrick Tambay	Can-Am; Champion; 1978	Succeeded by Jacky Ickx
Preceded by Jody Scheckter	Formula One World Champion; 1980	Succeeded by Nelson Piquet
Preceded by Charlie O'Brien; Garry Waldon; Mark Gibbs	Winner of the Bathurst 12 Hour; 1993; With: Garry Waldon	Succeeded by Gregg Hansford; Neil Crompton
Awards and achievements
Preceded by John Watson	Hawthorn Memorial Trophy; 1979–1981	Succeeded by John Watson
