= 1974 British Formula Three season =

Seasons
- ← 1973 1975 →

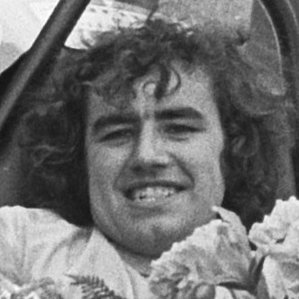
1974 double champion, Brian Henton

The 1974 British Formula Three season was the 24th season of the British Formula 3 season. It consisted of two championships. The 1974 B.A.R.C. Forward Trust British F3 Championship and the 1974 MCD Lombard North Central F3 Championship. Both of which were won by Brian Henton.

Brian Henton dominated the season taking home 15 victories and his team March Engineering Ltd taking home 18 overall. GRD as a constructor took home seven wins and modus took home one.

The season was started with reliability issues with only 5 cars starting the opening race. As the season progressed with March's dominance only GRD could put up a challenge to their dominant machinary.

== B.A.R.C. Forward Trust British F3 Championship ==
Champion: (United Kingdom) Brian Henton

Runner-up: (United States) Tony Rouff

Ran over 13 rounds, the scoring system was 9-6-4-3-2-1 points to the first six classified finishers.

=== Results ===
Date	Round	Circuit	Winning driver	Winning team	Winning car
24/03/74	Rd.1	(United Kingdom) Thruxton	(United Kingdom) Brian Henton	March Engineering Ltd	March 743-Ford
05/04/74	Rd.2	(United Kingdom) Silverstone	(United Kingdom) Brian Henton	March Engineering Ltd	March 743-Ford
12/04/74	Rd.3	(United Kingdom) Snetterton	(Brazil) Alex Dias Ribeiro	Hollywood Racing Team	GRD 373-Ford
19/04/74	Rd.4	(United Kingdom) Brands Hatch	(United Kingdom) Brian Henton	March Engineering Ltd	March 743-Ford
02/06/74	Rd.5	(United Kingdom) Cadwell Park	(United Kingdom) Brian Henton	March Engineering Ltd	March 743-Ford
09/06/74	Rd.6	(United Kingdom) Silverstone	(United States) Tony Rouff	Tony Rouff	GRD 373-Ford
21/07/74	Rd.7	(United Kingdom) Cadwell Park	(Portugal) José Espírito Santo	Santa Clara Portugal	March 743-Ford
27/07/74	Rd.8	(United Kingdom) Oulton Park	(United Kingdom) Brian Henton	March Engineering Ltd	March 743-Ford
18/08/74	Rd.9	(United Kingdom) Thruxton	(United Kingdom) Brian Henton	March Engineering Ltd	March 743-Ford
08/09/74	Rd.10	(United Kingdom) Silverstone	(Antigua and Barbuda) Mike Tyrrell	Tony Roles Racing	March 733-Ford
15/09/74	Rd.11	(United Kingdom) Brands Hatch	(United Kingdom) Brian Henton	March Engineering Ltd	March 743-Ford
06/10/74	Rd.12	(United Kingdom) Thruxton	(United States) Danny Sullivan	Team Modus	Modus M1-Ford
27/10/74	Rd.13	(United Kingdom) Thruxton	(United Kingdom) Brian Henton	March Engineering Ltd	March 743-Toyota

=== Table ===
Place	Driver	Entrant	Car	Total
1	(United Kingdom) Brian Henton	March Engineering Ltd	March 743-Toyota; March 743-Ford	81
2	(United States) Tony Rouff	Tony Rouff	GRD 373-Ford	54
3	(Portugal) José Espírito Santo	Santa Clara Portugal	March 733-Ford; March 743-Ford	36
4	(United States) Danny Sullivan	Team Modus	March 723-Ford; Modus M1-Ford	28
5	(Brazil) Alex Dias Ribeiro	Hollywood Racing Team	GRD 374-Ford	27
5	(Brazil) José Chateaubriand	March Engineering Ltd	March 743-Ford; March 743-Toyota	27
7	(Antigua and Barbuda) Mike Tyrell	Tony Roles Racing	March 733-Ford	15
8	(United Kingdom) Nicholas von Preussen	March Engineering Ltd	March 733-Ford	13
9	(Sweden) Conny Andersson	March Engineering Ltd	March 743-Toyota	10
10	(United Kingdom) Barrie Maskell	Barrie Maskell	Dastle Mk10B-Ford	8

== MCD Lombard North Central F3 Championship ==
Champion: (United Kingdom) Brian Henton

Runner-up: (Brazil) Alex Dias Ribeiro

Ran over 14 rounds, the scoring system was 9-6-4-3-2-1 points to the first six classified finishers with double points on the last race.

=== Results ===
Date	Round	Circuit	Winning driver	Winning team	Winning car
09/03/74	Rd.1	(United Kingdom) Oulton Park	(United Kingdom) Brian Henton	March Engineering Ltd	March 743-Ford
17/03/74	Rd.2	(United Kingdom) Silverstone	(United Kingdom) Brian Henton	March Engineering Ltd	March 743-Ford
12/04/74	Rd.3	(United Kingdom) Oulton Park	(United Kingdom) Brian Henton	March Engineering Ltd	March 743-Ford
28/04/74	Rd.4	(United Kingdom) Mallory Park	(United States) Tony Rouff	Tony Rouff	GRD 373-Ford
26/05/74	Rd.5	(United Kingdom) Brands Hatch	(United Kingdom) Nicholas von Preussen	Nicholas von Preussen	March 733-Ford
30/06/74	Rd.6	(United Kingdom) Snetterton	(United Kingdom) Nicholas von Preussen	Nicholas von Preussen	March 733-Ford
28/07/74	Rd.7	(United Kingdom) Snetterton	(United Kingdom) Brian Henton	March Engineering Ltd	March 743-Ford
10/08/74	Rd.8	(United Kingdom) Oulton Park	(Brazil) Alex Dias Ribeiro	Hollywood Racing Team	GRD 374-Ford
11/08/74	Rd.9	(United Kingdom) Brands Hatch	(United Kingdom) Brian Henton	March Engineering Ltd	March 743-Ford
25/08/74	Rd.10	(United Kingdom) Mallory Park	(United States) Tony Rouff	Tony Rouff	GRD 373-Ford
26/08/74	Rd.11	(United Kingdom) Silverstone	(United Kingdom) Brian Henton	March Engineering Ltd	March 743-Ford
22/09/74	Rd.12	(United Kingdom) Thruxton	(United States) Tony Rouff	Tony Rouff	GRD 373-Ford
28/09/74	Rd.13	(United Kingdom) Oulton Park	(United Kingdom) Brian Henton	March Engineering Ltd	March 743-Toyota
13/10/74	Rd.14	(United Kingdom) Brands Hatch	(Brazil) Alex Dias Ribeiro	Hollywood Racing Team	GRD 374-Ford

=== Table ===
Place	Driver	Entrant	Car	Total
1	(United Kingdom) Brian Henton	March Engineering Ltd	March 743-Toyota; March 743-Ford	78
2	(Brazil) Alex Dias Ribeiro	Hollywood Racing Team	GRD 374-Ford	60
3	(United States) Tony Rouff	Tony Rouff	GRD 373-Ford	54
4	(Brazil) José Chateaubriand	March Engineering Ltd	March 743-Ford; March 743-Toyota	32
5	(United Kingdom) Nicholas von Preussen	Nicholas von Preussen	March 733-Ford	29
6	(United Kingdom) Derek Lawrence	Dr Joseph Ehrlich	Ehrlich ES2-Ford	17
7	(United States) Danny Sullivan	Danny Sullivan	March 733-Ford; Modus M1-Ford	16
8	(Sweden) Conny Andersson	March Engineering Ltd	March 743-Toyota	11
9	(Antigua and Barbuda) Mike Tyrrell	Tony Roles Racing	March 733-Ford	8
10	(United Kingdom) Barrie Maskell	Barrie Maskell	Dastle Mk10B-Ford	7
