= 1973 British Formula Three season =

Seasons
- ← 1972 1974 →

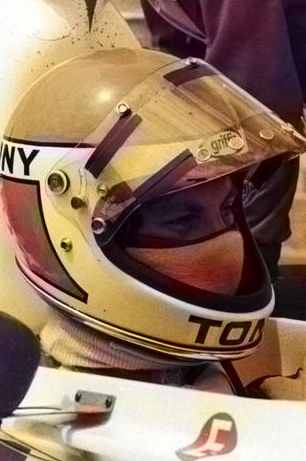
1973 John Player and Lombard champion, Tony Brise

The 1973 British Formula Three season was the 23rd season of the British Formula 3 season. It consisted of three championships. Tony Brise won the John Player and Lombard F3 (shared with Richard Robarts) Championships, whilst Ian Taylor won the Forward trust Championship.

== B.A.R.C. Forward Trust British F3 Championship ==
Champion: (United Kingdom) Ian Taylor

Runner-up: (United Kingdom) Tony Brise

Ran over 14 rounds, the scoring system was 9-6-4-3-2-1 points to the first six classified finishers.

=== Results ===
Round	Circuit	Date	Pole position	Winning driver	Winning team
1	(United Kingdom) Thruxton	25 March	(United Kingdom) Tony Brise	(United Kingdom) Ian Taylor	Chris Andrews
2	(United Kingdom) Snetterton	1 April	(United Kingdom) Mike Wilds	(Australia) Alan Jones	DART Racing with GRD
3	(United Kingdom) Mallory Park	6 May	(United Kingdom) Tony Brise	(United Kingdom) Ian taylor	Chris Andrews
4	(United Kingdom) Brands Hatch	20 May	(United Kingdom) Brian Henton	(United Kingdom) Richard Robarts	Myson Racing with GRD
5	(United Kingdom) Silverstone	10 June	(United States) Matt Spitzley	(United Kingdom) Tony Brise	Team Kent Messenger Racing
6	(United Kingdom) Thruxton	17 June	(United Kingdom) Ian Taylor	(United Kingdom) Ian Taylor	Chris Andrews
7	(United Kingdom) Cadwell Park	15 July	(Australia) Alan Jones	Race cancelled	
8	(United Kingdom) Thruxton	5 August	(United Kingdom) Mike Wilds	(France) Michel Leclère	Alpine Renault
9	(United Kingdom) Croft	12 August	(United Kingdom) Mo Harness	(United Kingdom) Mike Wilds	Dempster International Racing Team
10	(United Kingdom) Brands Hatch	19 August	(United Kingdom) Mo Harness	(United Kingdom) Ian Taylor	Chris Andrews
11	(United Kingdom) Castle Combe	27 August	N/A	(United Kingdom) Ian Taylor	Chris Andrews
12	(United Kingdom) Silverstone	9 September	(United Kingdom) Mike Wilds	(United Kingdom) Brian Henton	driver
13	(United Kingdom) Thruxton	16 September	(United Kingdom) Ian Taylor	(United Kingdom) Tony Brise	Team Kent Messenger Racing
14	(United Kingdom) Thruxton	28 October	(Brazil) Luis Antonio Siqueira Veiga	(United Kingdom) Richard Robarts	Myson Racing

=== Table ===
Place	Driver	Entrant	Total
1	(United Kingdom) Ian Taylor	Chris Andrews	64
2	(United Kingdom) Tony Brise	Team Kent Messenger Racing	42
3	(United Kingdom) Richard Robarts	Myson Racing	32
4	(United Kingdom) Mo Harness	driver	24
5	(Brazil) Leonel Friedrich	driver	23

== MCD John Player F3 Championship ==
Champion: (United Kingdom) Tony Brise

Runner-up: (Australia) Alan Jones

Ran over 14 rounds, the championship used a 20-15-12 points system with double points at the final race.

=== Results ===
Round	Circuit	Date	Pole position	Winning driver	Winning team
1	(United Kingdom) Silverstone	8 April	(United Kingdom) Russell Wood	(United Kingdom) Russell Wood	Chequered Flag-Peter Bloore Racing
2	(United Kingdom) Oulton Park	20 April	(United Kingdom) Tony Brise	(United Kingdom) Russell Wood	Chequered Flag-Peter Bloore Racing
3	(United Kingdom) Mallory Park	23 April	N/A	(Australia) Alan Jones	DART Racing/GRD Ltd
4	(Netherlands) Zandvoort	20 May	(Japan) Masami Kuwashima	(Australia) Alan Jones	DART Racing/GRD Ltd
5	(United Kingdom) Oulton Park	28 May	(Brazil) Leonel Friedrich	(Sweden) Conny Andersson	GeKås Kläder
6	Monaco	2 June	N/A	(France) Jacques Laffite	BP France
7	(France) Paul Ricard	1 July	(France) Alain Serpaggi	(France) Jacques Laffite	BP France
8	(United Kingdom) Silverstone	14 July	(Australia) Alan Jones	(United States) Tony Rouff	AB3 Racing Developments
9	(United Kingdom) Brands Hatch	29 July	(United Kingdom) Tony Brise	(United Kingdom) Tony Brise	Team Kent Messenger Racing
10	(France) Paul Ricard	2 September	N/A	(France) Michel Leclère	Societé des Automobiles Alpine
11	(United Kingdom) Brands Hatch	30 September	N/A	(United Kingdom) Brian Henton	Team Ensign
12	(United Kingdom) Oulton Park	7 October	(Australia) Larry Perkins	(Australia) Alan Jones	DART Racing with GRD
13	(United Kingdom) Mallory Park	14 October	(United Kingdom) Richard Robarts	(United Kingdom) Mike Wilds	Dempster International Racing Team
14	(United Kingdom) Brands Hatch	21 October	(United Kingdom) Ian Taylor	(United Kingdom) Tony Brise	Team Kent Messenger Racing

=== Table ===
Place	Driver	Entrant	Total
1	(United Kingdom) Tony Brise	Team Kent Messenger Racing	123
2	(Australia) Alan Jones	DART Racing with GRD	121
3	(United Kingdom) Russell Wood	Chequered Flag-Peter Bloore Racing	119
4	(France) Jacques Laffite	BP France	112
5	(United Kingdom) Ian Taylor	Colin Andrews	78

== MCD Lombard North Central F3 Championship ==
Champions: (United Kingdom) Tony Brise, (United Kingdom) Richard Robarts

Runner-up: (United Kingdom) Mike Wilds

Ran over 11 rounds, the scoring system was 9-6-4-3-2-1 points to the first six classified finishers. Double points were awarded at the last race and the fastest lap was worth 1 or 2 points.

=== Results ===
Round	Circuit	Date	Pole position	Winning driver	Winning team
1	(United Kingdom) Brands Hatch	4 March	(United Kingdom) Tony Brise	(United Kingdom) Russell Wood	Chequered Flag-Peter Bloore Racing
2	(United Kingdom) Silverstone	18 March	(Australia) Alan Jones	(Australia) Alan Jones	DART Racing with GRD
3	(United Kingdom) Snetterton	13 May	(Japan) Masami Kuwashima	(United Kingdom) Tony Brise	Team Kent Messenger
4	(United Kingdom) Brands Hatch	24 June	(United Kingdom) Richard Robarts	(United Kingdom) Tony Brise	Team Kent Messenger
5	(United Kingdom) Silverstone	1 July	(United Kingdom) Derek Lawrence	(United Kingdom) Richard Robarts	Myson Racing
6	(United Kingdom) Snetterton	8 July	(Australia) Alan Jones	(United Kingdom) Ian Taylor	Chris Andrews
7	(United Kingdom) Mallory Park	22 July	(United Kingdom) Mike Wilds	(United Kingdom) Brian Henton	driver
8	(United Kingdom) Oulton Park	11 August	(United Kingdom) Richard Robarts	(United Kingdom) Mo Harness	Team Modus Racing with Shellsport
9	(United Kingdom) Silverstone	27 August	(United Kingdom) Tony Brise	(Australia) Alan Jones	DART Racing with GRD
10	(United Kingdom) Oulton Park	8 September	(Australia) Alan Jones	(United Kingdom) Tony Brise	Team Kent Messenger
11	(United Kingdom) Brands Hatch	4 November	(United Kingdom) Tony Brise	(United Kingdom) Richard Robarts	Myson Racing

=== Table ===
Place	Driver	Entrant	Total
1	(United Kingdom) Tony Brise	Team Kent Messenger Racing	52
1	(United Kingdom) Richard Robarts	Myson Racing	52
3	(United Kingdom) Mike Wilds	Dempster International Racing Team	33
4	(United Kingdom) Russell Wood	Chequered Flag-Peter Bloore Racing	29
5	(Australia) Alan Jones	DART Racing with GRD	25
5	(United Kingdom) Ian Taylor	Chris Andrews	25
