= Harry Stiller =

British racing driver (1938–2018)

- Nationality: English
- Born: 28 May 1938
- Died: 13 May 2018 (aged 79)

Previous series
- Formula Two

Championship titles
- 1966 and 1967: British Formula Three

- Full name: Custom Made Harry Stiller Racing
- Base: United Kingdom
- Founder(s): Harry Stiller
- Noted staff: Harry Stiller
- Noted drivers: (Australia) Alan Jones

Formula One World Championship career
- First entry: 1975 Spanish Grand Prix
- Races entered: 4
- Constructors: Hesketh
- Drivers' Championships: 0
- Race victories: 0
- Pole positions: 0
- Fastest laps: 0
- Final entry: 1975 Swedish Grand Prix

Harry Stiller (28 May 1938 – 13 May 2018) was a British racing driver and British Formula Three Champion. His racing career covered the years between 1958 and 1969 and he drove a variety of different classes of cars. After stopping driving himself he became an entrant in 1970 and he had cars in Formula Three, Formula Atlantic, F5000 and in 1975, Formula One. After racing he became creator, developer and operator of Tucktonia, a south-coast leisure park in the 1970s and 1980s. He was also a director of the Rob Walker Motor Group in the UK during the 1970s and the owner of Harry Stiller Motor Cars on Wilshire Boulevard, in Beverly Hills, California, also in the 1970s, with agencies for Fiat, Lancia and Lotus and for leasing Rolls-Royce and Bentley motor cars in Los Angeles. During the early 1980s, he was a pioneer of the pound shop concept in the North East of England and opened units in Scarborough, Newcastle upon Tyne, Stockton and moved into the South as well with another five units along the South Coast and one in Hatfield.

Stiller was notable as the person responsible for starting Alan Jones in Formula One in 1975 with a privately owned Hesketh 308. This was not the first time Jones had driven for Stiller as he had done so in the works March Formula Atlantic car in the 1974 UK John Player championship.

Stiller was a life member of the British Racing Drivers' Club (BRDC), and lived in Christchurch, Dorset, England with his wife Annie.

== Racing career ==
- Double British F3 Champion in 1966 and 1967 (joint holder of the highest number of wins in one F3 season with Ayrton Senna).
- European Cup captain of the British F3 team in 1968.
- Works F2 driver for Cooper, Lola and Merlyn.
- Drove at Le Mans in 1962 and 1967.

== Non-Championship Formula One results ==
(key)

Year	Entrant	Chassis	Engine	1	2	3	4	5	6
1967	Bob Gerard Racing	Cooper T82	Ford Cosworth FVA 1.6 L4	ROC	SPR	INT	SYR	OUL; 11	ESP

== Complete Formula One World Championship results (as entrant) ==
(key)

Year	Chassis	Engine	Tyre	Driver	1	2	3	4	5	6	7	8	9	10	11	12	13	14
1975	Hesketh 308B	Ford Cosworth DFV 3.0 V8	G		ARG	BRA	RSA	ESP	MON	BEL	SWE	NED	FRA	GBR	GER	AUT	ITA	USA
1975	Hesketh 308B	Ford Cosworth DFV 3.0 V8	G	(Australia) Alan Jones				Ret	Ret	Ret	11							
