= Michael Tyrrell =

Antiguan drug trafficker (1946 – 2013)

Michael Tyrell (1946 – 30 May 2013) was an Antigua-born drug trafficker who headed a drug ring along with his Common Law wife Julie Paterson, known as the "Cocaine Queen". In 1999, he and his "wife" were caught by authorities attempting to smuggle nearly half a ton of cocaine aboard the yacht Blue Hen sailing from Bequia to Great Britain, one of the largest consignments ever to be smuggled into the country.

== Early life ==
Although born to a wealthy family, Ferrell had previously served a prison sentence for his involvement in smuggling marijuana in Guadeloupe and Antigua during his youth. He eventually became a well known and colourful figure in Antigua's yachting circles and later met his wife, Julie Paterson, then the owner of a local yacht charter service.

== Career ==
After marrying in 1994, Tyrell and his wife cooperated on a large scale drug trafficking operation worth $10 million. Along with his friend and criminal associate Frederic Fillingham, a former boatbuilder and sailor who had fled the United States after receiving parole on drug smuggling charges, Tyrrell contacted Robert Kavanagh who used his connections with Colombian drug cartels to secure the delivery of 396 kg of cocaine for Tyrrell's organization.

While he was apparently undetected by the Drug Enforcement Administration, Tyrrell long had a reputation for bragging of his criminal activities and operated freely within Antigua while continuing to hold meetings with known drug traffickers (including an unidentified member of a Colombian drug cartel) and recruiting members of the drug ring.

However, while thought to be safe from local officials, he was eventually discovered by British authorities and his activities soon came under Operation Eyeful, one of the largest surveillance operations ever undertaken by Customs and Police. Keeping a close watch over Tyrrell and Paterson for several months, they were eventually observed unloading their cargo at Orchard Cove, west of Ventnor, on the Isle of Wight.

== Arrest and trial ==
Paterson and Fillingham were later arrested by an officer of the Customs Law Enforcement while hiding in a nearby gazebo. Tyrrell and eight others were tried at Snaresbrook Crown Court and convicted of drug trafficking charges. Tyrrell was sentenced to 26 years imprisonment while his accomplices Robert Kavanagh and Didier Andre Lebrun received 24 and 19 years imprisonment respectively. Julie Paterson was the second person to be arrested by Customs Officers, whilst sheltering with a fellow smuggler in a gazebo near Tyrells house.

Paterson was convicted of additional charges of money laundering and sentenced to 24 years imprisonment, the longest sentence ever for a female drug trafficker.

== Death ==
While serving his sentence at the high-security Frankland Prison near Durham city, Tyrrell died at the University Hospital of North Durham on 30 May 2013.
