= Safir Engineering =

Safir Engineering is a British racecar engineering firm.

In 1975, the company purchased the Token RJ02 Formula One car, renamed it the "Safir" and raced it in the 1975 Race of Champions and BRDC International Trophy, driven by Tony Trimmer.

Later, Peter Thorp of Safir entered into an agreement with Walter Hayes of Ford Motor Company and John Wilment of J.W. Automotive Engineering to continue to produce a limited number of GT40s, the Mk V, during the 1980s. At which time, Safir Engineering applied for and was issued a trademark from the United States Patent and Trademark Office for the GT40 mark, the Ford Motor Company having never done so.
