= Group Racing Developments =

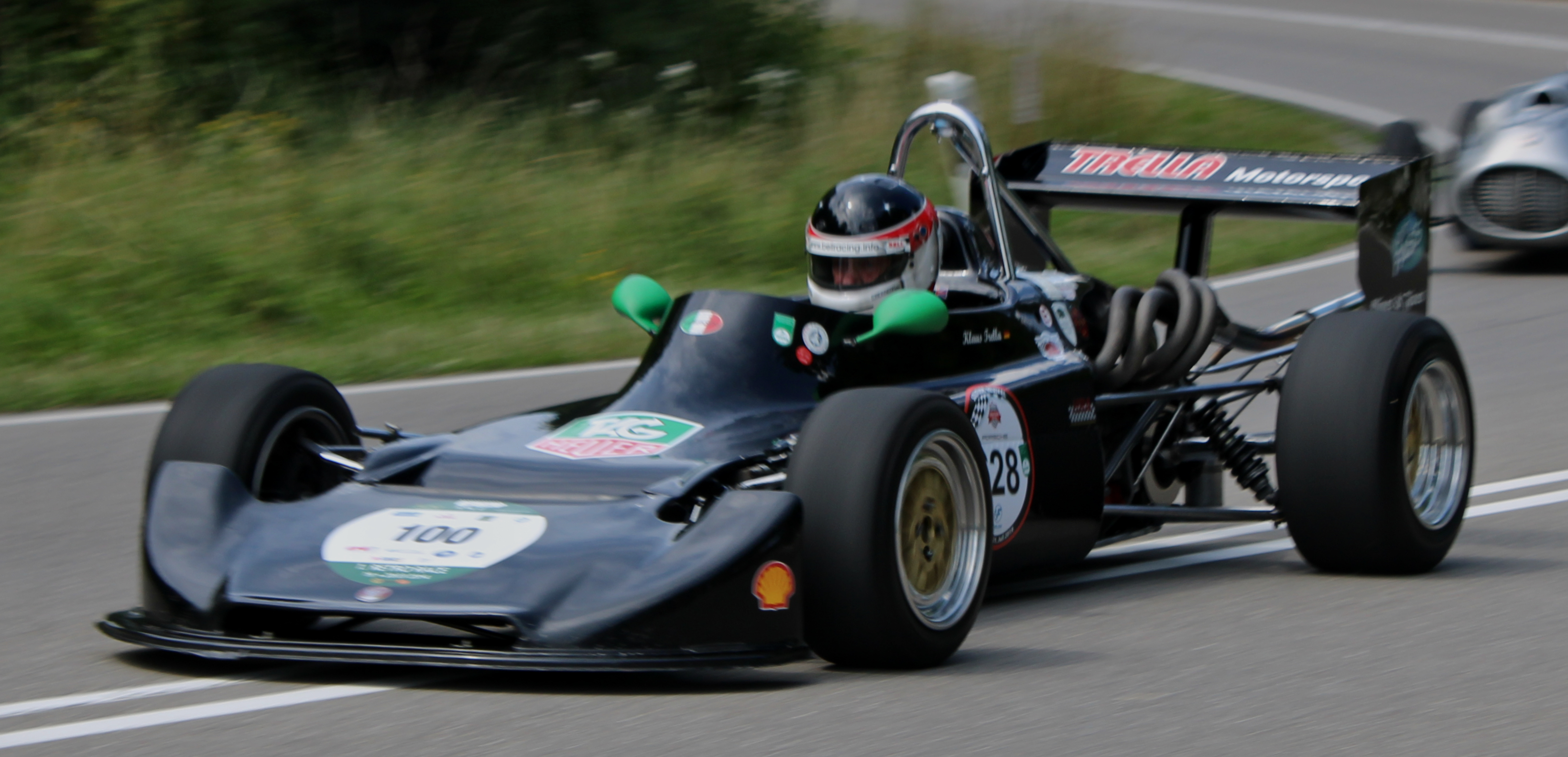
- GRD 374
- Industry: Automotive
- Founded: 1971
- Founder: Mike Warner; Dave Baldwin; Derek Wild; Gordon Huckle
- Defunct: 1975
- Fate: Bought by Van Diemen
- Headquarters: Griston, Norfolk, England

Group Racing Developments, known more simply as GRD, was a short-lived British constructor of racing cars. It was formed in 1971 with a large percentage of staff coming from those made redundant from the closure of Lotus Cars customer car manufacturing arm. They built cars for Formula 2, Formula 3, Formula Atlantic and Sports 2000 racing classes until a decline in British racing vehicle manufacturing bit into the industry in 1975 that paralleled the oil crisis.

== Cars ==
Year	Model	Racing series	Note
1972	GRD 272	Formula 2	
1972	GRD 272	British Formula Atlantic	
1972	GRD 372	Formula 3	Roger Williamson won the Forward Trust BARC F3 and the Shellsport National F3 British F3 championships
1972	GRD S72	World Championship for Makes S1.6	
1973	GRD 273	Formula 2	
1973	GRD 273	British Formula Atlantic	
1973	GRD 373	Formula 3	Gunnar Nordström finished fourth in the Monaco F3 Grand Prix
1973	GRD S73	World Championship for Makes S2.5	
1974	GRD 274	Formula 2	
1974	GRD 274	British Formula Atlantic	
1974	GRD 374	Formula 3	
1974	GRD S74	World Championship for Makes S2.5	
1975	GRD 375	Formula 3	Renzo Zorzi won the 1975 Monaco F3 Grand Prix
1975	GRD S75	World Championship for Makes S1.6	
