= Wheatcroft Trophy =

Annual award for the contribution in motorsport world

- Description: Recognition of a person who has made significant contributions to the motorsport world and industry
- Country: United Kingdom
- First award: 2002

The Tom Wheatcroft Trophy has been awarded annually since 2002 in recognition of a person who has made significant contributions to the motorsport world and industry. It was founded by Kevin Wheatcroft in commemoration of his father Tom Wheatcroft, a lifelong motorsport enthusiast, team owner, constructor, the owner of Donington Park motor racing circuit and the Donington Grand Prix Collection.

The trophy is a representation of a steering wheel mounted on a Grand Prix car driven by Roger Williamson who was Tom Wheatcroft's protégé in the early 1970s.

The award winners are:

- 2002 - Murray Walker
- 2003 - Professor Sid Watkins
- 2004 - Jean Todt
- 2005 - Bernie Ecclestone
- 2006 - Professor Jürgen Hubbert of Mercedes-Benz
- 2007 - Sir Stirling Moss
- 2008 - Sir Frank Williams
- 2009
- 2010 - Rick Hall
- 2011 - David Richards, chairman of Aston Martin

== Tom Wheatcroft Memorial Trophy ==
Every year since 2010, the Donington Park Racing Association Club has presented a tall silver cup trophy in memory of Tom Wheatcroft, the Tom Wheatcroft Memorial Trophy. It is presented alternately to bikes and cars:

- 2010 Kevin Wheatcroft
- 2011 Marco Melandri, World Superbikes
- 2012 Olivier Pla, Bertand Baguette and Dimitrie Enjalbert, European Le Mans Series
- 2013 Alex Lowes, British Superbike Championship
- 2014 Jason Plato, British Touring Car Championship
- 2015 James Ellison, British Superbike Championship
- 2016 Matt Jackson, British Touring Car Championship
- 2017 Danny Buchan, British Superbike Championship
- 2018 John Minshaw and Phil Keen, British GT Championship
- 2019 Todd Ellis and Charlie Richardson, British Sidecar Championship
- 2021 Ben Birchall and Tom Birchall, British Sidecar Championship
- 2022 Luke Browning, GB3 Championship
- 2023 Joe Talbot, National Superstock 1000 Championship
- 2024 David Shaw, Masters Racing Legends
