= Wheatcroft =

Wheatcroft may refer to:

== People ==
- Chris Wheatcroft, British piano player
- Freddie Wheatcroft (1882–1917), English footballer
- George Wheatcroft (1799–1860), English cricketer
- George Wheatcroft (1905–1987), English chess player
- Geoffrey Wheatcroft (born 1945), British journalist and writer
- Georgina Wheatcroft (born 1965), Canadian curler
- Harry Wheatcroft (1898–1977), English rose grower
- John Wheatcroft (1925–2017), American writer
- Nelson Wheatcroft (1852–1897)
- Kevin Wheatcroft (born 1959), British businessman and motor sport entrepreneur
- Patience Wheatcroft, Baroness Wheatcroft (born 1951), British journalist
- Paul Wheatcroft (born 1980), English footballer
- Stephen G. Wheatcroft (born 1947), Australian historian
- Steve Wheatcroft (born 1978), American golfer
- Tom Wheatcroft (1922–2009), English businessman
- William Wheatcroft (died 1550s), English politician

== Places ==
- Wheatcroft, Derbyshire, England
- Wheatcroft, Kentucky, United States

== Sport ==
- Wheatcroft Racing, a racing team
