= Pay driver =

Driver who brings funding to a professional auto racing team

A pay driver is a driver for a professional auto racing team who, instead of being paid by the owner of their car, drives for free and brings with them either personal sponsorship or personal or family funding to finance the team's operations. This may be done to gain on-track experience or to live the lifestyle of a driver in a particular series when one's talent or credentials do not merit a paying ride. Alternatively, said person is also called a ride buyer or a rich kid in the United States, a gentleman driver in sports car and GT racing and a privateer in Australia.

Pay drivers have been the norm in many of the feeder series of motorsport, particularly in Formula 2, Formula 3, NASCAR O'Reilly Series, and Indy NXT. However, there have been many pay drivers in top level series like Formula One, the World Rally Championship, the IndyCar Series, and the NASCAR Cup Series.

Beyond these series, there are many auto racing competitions intended primarily or exclusively for self-funded amateurs who compete for fun, usually without serious aspirations of competing professionally. While the term "gentleman driver" is occasionally applied to racers in such series, this article focuses on the highest-profile professional auto racing categories.

== Formula One ==
=== Gentleman drivers and sponsored racers ===
At one time F1 regulations regarding the changing of drivers during the course of a season were extremely liberal, which encouraged some teams to recruit a string of pay drivers to drive their cars, sometimes only for one or two races. In the 1970s, Frank Williams Racing Cars (the predecessor to Frank Williams and Patrick Head's highly successful Williams F1 team) were particularly prolific with regard to the number of drivers they would use in a season - ten drivers drove for the team in both 1975 and 1976. Pay drivers experienced a revival in the late 1980s and early 1990s, as many small constructors like Pacific, Forti, and Rial joined the grid and were desperate for funding.

In general, pay drivers (such as Giovanni Lavaggi, Jean-Denis Délétraz, Nikita Mazepin, Ricardo Rosset, and Alex Yoong) are usually associated with poorer performances compared to those with paid drives. As such, teams willing to accept pay drivers are often at the back of the grid and struggling financially. While a pay driver often brings an infusion of much needed funding, their terms often require share ownership and / or influence in the team's operations. A team that relies too heavily on pay drivers can enter a downwards spiral; a pay driver may scare off sponsors, which makes the team more dependent on that pay driver. For example, after wealthy Brazilian driver Pedro Diniz left the Forti team for Ligier after the 1995 season, Forti withdrew from Formula One midway through 1996.

The competence of pay drivers varies. Three-time Formula One world champion Niki Lauda grew up in a wealthy family. Against his parents' will, he was able to borrow money against his life insurance to secure drives in Formula Two and Formula One. His performances impressed Ferrari driver Clay Regazzoni, who persuaded Enzo Ferrari to pay off Lauda's debts. More prosaically, Pedro Diniz managed to score some decent results compared to the other pay drivers of the time, scoring championship points in eight races over six years (two fifth-place finishes and six sixth-place finishes, at a time when only the top six drivers scored points; currently, the top 10 finishers score points, and Diniz had 26 top-10 finishes), when many other pay drivers did not score any points or even failed to qualify for races. It was said that Diniz was "competent enough that his presence in the sport was largely accepted."

In recent years, there have been fewer traditional pay drivers on the grid. Instead, the "pay driver" tag has (at times) now been extended from family-funded drivers to drivers who have strong relationships with wealthy corporate sponsors. For example, Sauber allegedly received $30-35 million/year from Chinese advertisers once Chinese driver Zhou Guanyu signed with the team. The lines in this space are somewhat blurred, as several sponsor-backed drivers have attained impressive results in Formula One, including race winners Sergio Perez, Robert Kubica, and Pastor Maldonado, who were backed by Telmex, Orlen, and PDVSA, respectively. Claire Williams (whose Williams team signed a string of well-funded drivers in the 2010s, such as Kubica, Maldonado, Lance Stroll, and Sergey Sirotkin) publicly defended the practice, arguing that corporate sponsorship was a imperfect proxy for driver quality, as star drivers like Fernando Alonso also bring sponsors with them wherever they go. However, after her retirement, she admitted that "unfortunately, ... I had to sell race seats" to keep the team afloat.

=== Paying drivers, but not "pay drivers" ===
Not all drivers who pay for their seats are stigmatized as "pay drivers." The most common example is the academy driver, who typically signs with an established auto manufacturer or top-level racing team. Because F1 teams are limited to two drivers per race, a championship contender will often sign two established drivers, in which case it will need to pay other teams to make room for its junior drivers. In recent years, Mercedes placed George Russell with its engine customer Williams, and Ferrari placed Charles Leclerc and Antonio Giovinazzi with Alfa Romeo-Sauber.

Most famously, in 1991, Mercedes (which did not enter Formula One until the debut of Sauber-Mercedes in 1993) paid the Jordan team $150,000 to give its junior driver Michael Schumacher his F1 debut. Schumacher never drove for Jordan again, as Mercedes was unable to strike a season-long deal with Jordan and placed Schumacher with Benetton instead. Impressed by Schumacher's maiden performance, Benetton agreed to sign him for free, wiping out his "pay driver" status after just one race.

In addition, several drivers who paid for rides in the comparatively affordable junior formulae were able to strike out on their own after making it to Formula One. Three-time champion Ayrton Senna received financial assistance from his wealthy father during his junior career in Britain, and 1992 champion Nigel Mansell quit his engineering job and mortgaged his house to drive professionally.

=== Decline of the traditional pay driver ===
Although pay drivers still exist in Formula One, they are less common than they used to be for a number of reasons:

1. There are fewer teams in Formula One than in the early 1990s, leaving fewer opportunities for all drivers, including pay drivers.
2. In 2016, the FIA introduced the FIA Super License, which requires drivers to attain certain performance benchmarks in lower formulae or other competitions (e.g. IndyCar, Deutsche Tourenwagen Masters) before racing in Formula One. As a result, every driver in Formula One, pay driver or not, has had a relatively successful career before Formula One. For example, Nicholas Latifi only made it to Formula One after finishing second in the 2019 Formula Two season (albeit after four and a half seasons in F2 and its equivalents); the top three finishers in Formula Two automatically earn enough Super License points to be promoted to Formula One.
3. In general, Formula One teams are more financially stable than they were in the 1990s or 2000s, meaning that fewer teams need to hire pay drivers to pay the bills. The Williams team was in chronic financial distress for much of the 2010s until the Williams family sold the team to a private equity investor.
4. The disparity in performance bonuses for placing sixth, seventh, etc. in the Constructors' Championship incentivizes teams to compete for every additional point. In 2023, Williams team principal James Vowles said that while a pay driver could "bring in a few million," an experienced driver could make the team even more money.
5. Today, the expenses of running a Formula One team are so great that few drivers can finance their F1 careers with family money. A notable exception is Lance Stroll, who debuted with Williams after allegedly receiving $80 million in financial backing from his father, including junior formulae expenses. Even so, Stroll had a fairly strong resume for a pay driver, having beaten the now-current F1 driver George Russell for the 2016 FIA Formula 3 European Championship title. In addition, since joining Formula One, he has scored three F1 podiums as of September 2025. Nonetheless, he was dogged by accusations that his father's financial backing had given him an unfair advantage in his junior career. By comparison, it would take Russell another two years to make it to Formula One.

Although the standard for pay drivers has improved following the introduction of the Super License, hiring a pay driver may still be a risky proposition, as the margin between a midfield car and a backmarker can be quite thin in today's Formula One. During the 2018 season, Williams received £65 million in funding in exchange for allocating its two seats to Lance Stroll and Sergey Sirotkin, but finished last in the standings. Nonetheless, pay drivers (whether sponsored or family-backed) remain a potential alternative for cash-strapped teams. According to Kevin Magnussen, in 2020, Williams considered replacing George Russell with Magnussen if the Dane could find enough sponsors, even though Russell had consistently outperformed the family-backed Nicholas Latifi during the 2020 season.

The Super Licence system has occasionally been criticized for slowing promising young talents' path to Formula One. Four-time world champion Max Verstappen, who went directly from European Formula Three to Formula One, opined that the Super License "was introduced because of me, of course," and encouraged the FIA to relax its rules for the most talented young drivers. Verstappen added that pay drivers can still make it to Formula One despite the Super License system. (Because a driver has three years to obtain the 40 required Super License points, drivers can qualify for Formula One without racing in Formula Two.)

In addition, while the Super License prevents truly incompetent drivers from making it to Formula One, the high cost of racing in junior formulae (estimated at €2-3 million/year) makes it difficult for a junior driver without family resources or outside backing to qualify for a Super License. Seven-time world champion Lewis Hamilton expressed concern that "There are only wealthy kids coming through [today]. There are not kids from working-class families."

== Sports car racing ==
By contrast to F1, "gentlemen drivers" are an integral and accepted feature of sports car racing, particularly in lower categories (such as LMP2 Pro-Am) not competing for outright wins at races like the 24 Hours of Le Mans.

In some sports car categories, drivers are categorised according to their age and previous successes in professional motorsport, and teams are required to run at least one driver over 30 who has not had significant success in the top professional series. These drivers will generally provide most or all of the team's funding.

== Other series ==
Some sanctioning bodies will offer champions of lower tier series a well-funded ride for the next tier. The Road to Indy programme from INDYCAR awards a ride fully funded by The Goodyear Tire and Rubber Company (was funded by Mazda originally, then Cooper Tire, and now Goodyear) for a series champion in the next tier. A $150,000 and tires package is available to a shootout winner among an invited group young American and foreign drivers. A driver who wins the U.S. F2000 National Championship will win $300,000 to be used for a "pay ride" in the Pro Mazda Championship, and two sets of tires per race. Pro Mazda winners will be paid for a ride in Indy Lights, and the Indy Lights champion earns funding to compete in at least three IndyCar Series races, including the Indianapolis 500.

Pay drivers are also common in stock car racing and are very prevalent in development series such as the Xfinity Series and ARCA Racing Series. There are also several pay drivers competing at the Cup level including Matt Tifft and Paul Menard, the son of home improvement tycoon John Menard Jr.. Menard had some success with a victory at the Brickyard 400 in 2011 and a Chase for the Sprint Cup appearance in 2015, while medical issues halted Tifft's racing career in 2019. Pay drivers were controversial in stock car racing if payments failed; an example would be in 2015, when Kyle Busch's Camping World Truck Series team, Kyle Busch Motorsports, sued former driver Justin Boston, a pay driver, and the sponsor for missed payments.

There has also been a long history of pay drivers in Australian touring car racing. Historically referred to as "privateers", these people usually consisted of do-it-yourself businessmen looking to promote their companies through racing – the concept peaking in the late 1990s with the birth of the V8 Supercars and the creation of a Privateers Cup. This series eventually branched off and became the Konica Lites Series (now the Super2 Series), with the construct disappearing as the racing became more expensive and professionalised.
