= Lost Generation (disambiguation) =

Lost Generation was the generation that came of age during World War I.

Lost Generation may also refer to:

== Films ==
- The Lost Generation (1968 film), Hungarian film
- Feng shui er shi nian (1983), Hong Kong-Taiwanese film by Chia Chang Liu, alternately titled in English, The Lost Generation, and titled worldwide in English, Women in Love

== Literature ==
- The Lost Generation (book), a 2006 biographical book by David Tremayne
- The Lost Generation (novel series), a novel series by Hikmet Temel Akarsu

== Music ==
- The Lost Generation (band), a Chicago soul group
- The Lost Generation (album), a 1996 album by Shyheim
- Lost Generation (1996), an album by Afrika Bambaataa
- Lost Generation (album), 1975 album by Elliott Murphy
- "Lost Generation" (song), a 2013 song by Rizzle Kicks

== Other uses ==
- Japanese generation that experienced the Employment Ice Age
- Marvel: The Lost Generation, a 12-issue limited series published by Marvel Comics
- Down to the Countryside Movement, young Chinese civilians during the Cultural Revolution moved to the countryside for agricultural work instead of education
- The "lost" generation, 1930–1970, mid-20th-century Mormons who wrote for a national audience and lost close ties to their church
- The lost generation, African-American children growing up in Prince Edward County, Virginia from 1959 to 1964

== See also ==
- Generation (disambiguation)
- Generation Lost, a 2006 DVD documentary by the band Rise Against
- Generations Lost, a video game for the Sega Genesis
- Justice League: Generation Lost, a DC Comics limited series
- Lost (disambiguation)
- Stolen Generation, Indigenous Australian children subject to forced assimilation
