= 1972 British Formula Three season =

Seasons
- ← 1971 1973 →

The 1972 British Formula Three season was the 22nd season of the British Formula 3 season. It consisted of three championships. Roger Williamson won the Shell Super Oil and Forward Trust F3 Championships, while Rikky von Opel won the Lombard Championship.

== B.A.R.C. Forward Trust British F3 Championship ==
Champion: (United Kingdom) Roger Williamson

Runner-up: (Liechtenstein) Rikky von Opel

=== Results ===
Round	Circuit	Date	Pole position	Winning driver	Winning team
1	(United Kingdom) Mallory Park	12 March	(United Kingdom) Barrie Maskell	(United Kingdom) Barrie Maskell	Travisco Racing
2	(United Kingdom) Silverstone	16 April	(United Kingdom) Roger Williamson	(United Kingdom) Mike Walker	Team Ensign
3	(United Kingdom) Silverstone	14 May	(United Kingdom) Roger Williamson	(United Kingdom) Roger Williamson	Wheatcroft Racing
4	(United Kingdom) Silverstone	11 June	(United Kingdom) Mike Walker	(Liechtenstein) Rikky von Opel	Team Ensign
5	(United Kingdom) Thruxton	18 June	(Liechtenstein) Rikky von Opel	(Liechtenstein) Rikky von Opel	Team Ensign
6	(United Kingdom) Cadwell Park	16 July	(United Kingdom) Mike Walker	(United Kingdom) Roger Williamson	Wheatcroft Racing
7	(United Kingdom) Thruxton	30 July	(United Kingdom) Roger Williamson	(United Kingdom) Roger Williamson	Wheatcroft Racing
8	(United Kingdom) Thruxton	27 August	(Liechtenstein) Rikky von Opel	(Liechtenstein) Rikky von Opel	Team Ensign
9	(United Kingdom) Crystal Palace	9 September	(United Kingdom) Tony Brise	(United Kingdom) Mike Walker	Team Ensign
10	(United Kingdom) Thruxton	24 September	(United Kingdom) Mike Walker	(United Kingdom) Roger Williamson	Wheatcroft Racing
11	(United Kingdom) Thruxton	29 October	(United Kingdom) Tony Brise	(United Kingdom) Tony Brise	driver

=== Table ===
Place	Driver	Entrant	Total
1	(United Kingdom) Roger Williamson	Wheatcroft Racing	50
2	(Liechtenstein) Rikky von Opel	Team Ensign	48
3	(United Kingdom) Mike Walker	Team Ensign	46
4	(United Kingdom) Tony Brise	driver	18
5	(United Kingdom) Barrie Maskell	Travisco Racing	13

== B.R.S.C.C. Shell Super Oil British Formula 3 Championship ==
Champion: (United Kingdom) Roger Williamson

Runner-up: (United Kingdom) Colin Vandervell

=== Results ===
Round	Circuit	Date	Pole position	Winning driver	Winning team
1	(United Kingdom) Brands Hatch	19 March	(United Kingdom) Tom Pryce	(United Kingdom) Tom Pryce	D.J.Bond Racing
2	(United Kingdom) Oulton Park	31 March	(United Kingdom) Tom Pryce	(United Kingdom) Roger Williamson	Wheatcroft Racing
3	(United Kingdom) Mallory Park	3 April	(United Kingdom) Barrie Maskell	(United Kingdom) Tony Trimmer	Team Lotus
4	(United Kingdom) Silverstone	23 April	(United Kingdom) Barrie Maskell	(United Kingdom) Roger Williamson	Wheatcroft Racing
5	(Netherlands) Zandvoort	30 April	(United Kingdom) Colin Vandervell	(United Kingdom) Mike Walker	Team Ensign
6	Monaco	13 May	(France) Patrick Depailler	(France) Patrick Depailler	Societé des Automobiles Alpine
7	(United Kingdom) Mallory Park	29 May	(France) Jacques Coulon	(United Kingdom) Colin Vandervell	Potterton International Ltd
8	(Sweden) Anderstorp	18 June	(United Kingdom) Mike Walker	(United Kingdom) Roger Williamson	Wheatcroft Racing
9	(United Kingdom) Brands Hatch	15 July	(United Kingdom) Roger Williamson	(United Kingdom) Roger Williamson	Wheatcroft Racing
10	(France) Paul Ricard	8 August	(France) Michel Leclere	(France) Michel Leclere	Societé des Automobiles Alpine
11	(United Kingdom) Oulton Park	16 September	(France) Jacques Coulon	(United Kingdom) Roger Williamson	Wheatcroft Racing
12	(United Kingdom) Mallory Park	1 October	(United Kingdom) Russell Wood	(United Kingdom) Tony Brise	driver
13	(United Kingdom) Snetterton	8 October	(United Kingdom) Mike Walker	(United Kingdom) Roger Williamson	Wheatcroft Racing
14	(United Kingdom) Brands Hatch	22 October	(United Kingdom) Roger Williamson	(France) Jacques Coulon	Ecurie Antar Filipinetti

=== Table ===
Place	Driver	Entrant	Total
1	(United Kingdom) Roger Williamson	Wheatcroft Racing	78
2	(United Kingdom) Colin Vandervell	Potterton International Ltd	44
3	(France) Jacques Coulon	Ecurie Antar Filipinetti	26
4	(United Kingdom) Mike Walker	Team Ensign	25
5	(Liechtenstein) Rikky von Opel	Team Ensign	23

== MCD Lombard North Central F3 Championship ==
Champions: (Liechtenstein) Rikky von Opel

Runner-up: (United Kingdom) Tony Brise

=== Results ===
Round	Circuit	Date	Pole position	Winning driver	Winning team
1	(United Kingdom) Brands Hatch	5 March	(United Kingdom) Andy Sutcliffe	(United Kingdom) Andy Sutcliffe	GRS International
2	(United Kingdom) Snetterton	26 March	(United Kingdom) Mike Walker	(United Kingdom) Andy Sutcliffe	GRS International
3	(United Kingdom) Rufforth	1 April	(United Kingdom) Neil Ginn	(United Kingdom) Andy Sutcliffe	GRS International
4	(United Kingdom) Oulton Park	29 April	(Liechtenstein) Rikky von Opel	(United Kingdom) Tony Brise	driver
5	(United Kingdom) Thruxton	30 April	(United Kingdom) Andy Sutcliffe	(Liechtenstein) Rikky von Opel	Team Ensign
6	(United Kingdom) Brands Hatch	28 May	(United Kingdom) Mike Walker	(United Kingdom) Bob Evans	Alan McKechnie Racing
7	(United Kingdom) Brands Hatch	25 June	(United Kingdom) Tom Pryce	(United Kingdom) Andy Sutcliffe	GRS International
8	(United Kingdom) Mallory Park	25 July	(United Kingdom) Mike Walker	(United Kingdom) Roger Williamson	Wheatcroft Racing
9	(United Kingdom) Brands Hatch	13 August	(United Kingdom) Tony Brise	(United Kingdom) Tony Brise	driver
10	(United Kingdom) Oulton Park	26 August	(United Kingdom) Andy Sutcliffe	(Liechtenstein) Rikky von Opel	Team Ensign
11	(United Kingdom) Silverstone	28 August	(United Kingdom) Roger Williamson	(Japan) Masami Kuwashima	Reystan Racing Ltd
12	(United Kingdom) Cadwell Park	10 September	(United Kingdom) Roger Williamson	(United Kingdom) Roger Williamson	Wheatcroft Racing
13	(United Kingdom) Brands Hatch	15 October	(Liechtenstein) Rikky von Opel	(Liechtenstein) Rikky von Opel	Team Ensign

=== Table ===
Place	Driver	Entrant	Total
1	(Liechtenstein) Rikky von Opel	Team Ensign	61
2	(United Kingdom) Tony Brise	driver	55
3	(United Kingdom) Andy Sutcliffe	GRS International	53
4	(United Kingdom) Roger Williamson	Wheatcroft Racing	30
5	(United Kingdom) Damien Magee	Palliser Racing Design Ltd	24
