= Kevin Wheatcroft =

British businessman

- Born: 1959 (age 66–67)
- Occupation: Businessman
- Parent(s): Tom Wheatcroft; Helena Morgenstern

Kevin Wheatcroft (born 1959) is a British businessman and motor sport entrepreneur. He owns The Wheatcroft Collection, which is thought to be the largest private collection of military vehicles in the world.

== Early life ==
Born in 1959, Kevin Wheatcroft is one of seven children of the building contractor and motor-racing entrepreneur Tom Wheatcroft and his German wife Helena "Lenchen" Morgenstern. When his father died in 2009, Kevin inherited his entire estate and "no longer speaks to his siblings".

Wheatcroft left school at the age of 16, working first for a Leicestershire engineering firm, before joining his father's construction company.

== Career ==
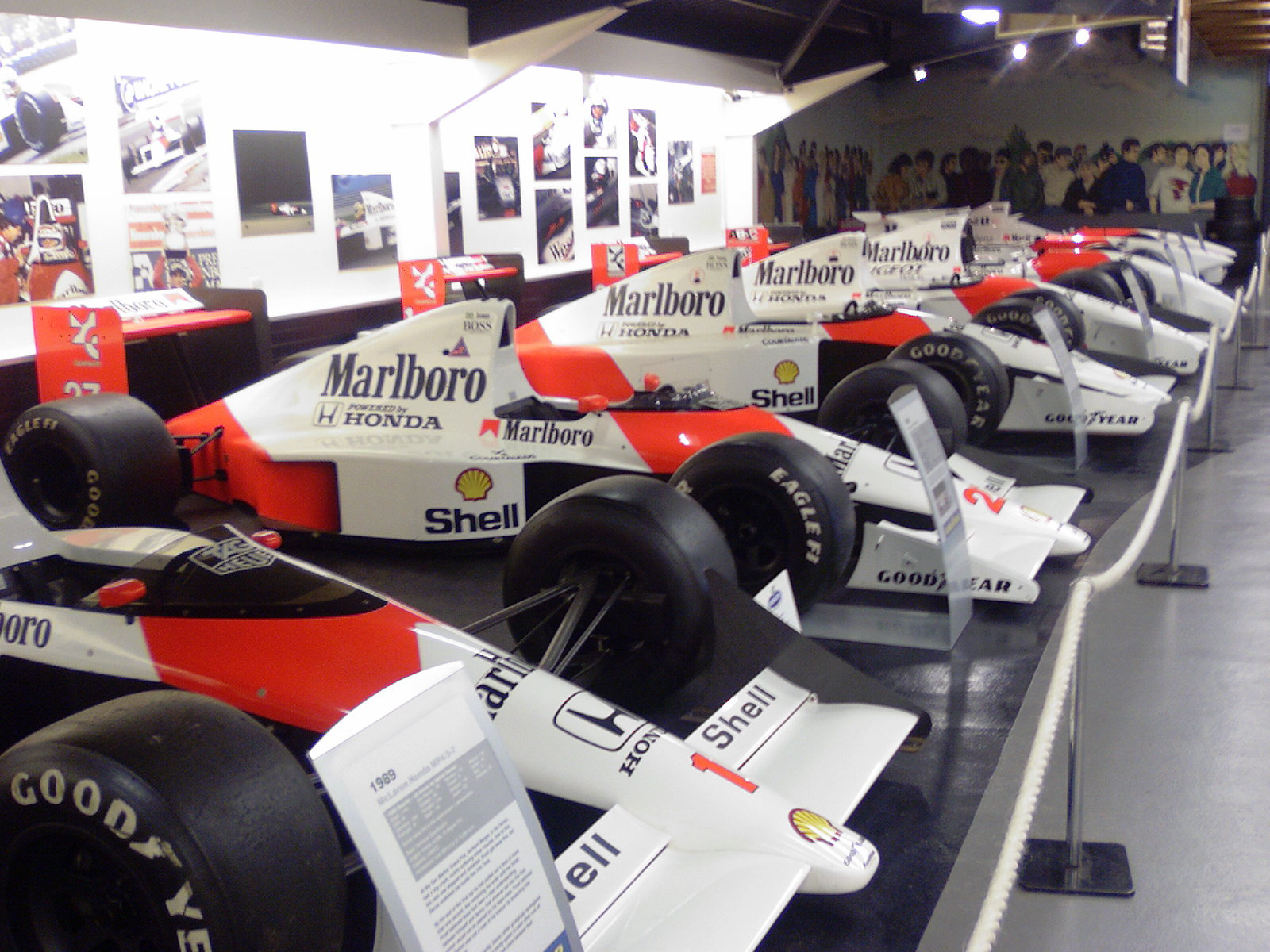
McLaren Hall at Donington Grand Prix Exhibition

In 2002, Kevin Wheatcroft and Donington Park Racing established the Wheatcroft Trophy in memory of his father, a lifelong motorsport enthusiast, team owner, constructor, and the owner of the Donington Park motor racing circuit and the Donington Grand Prix Collection. The trophy is awarded annually to someone who has made a significant contribution to the world of motorsport.

Wheatcroft is the executive chairman of Donington Park Racing and Donington Park Leisure Limited.

According to The Sunday Times Rich List in 2020 his net worth was estimated at £132 million.

== German World War II memorabilia collection ==
The Wheatcroft Collection is believed to include the world's largest collection of German World War II memorabilia. Its value has been estimated at £100 million. Wheatcroft acquired his first item at age five, a bullet-marked SS storm trooper's helmet, which he had asked his parents to give him for his birthday. At age 15, he bought three Second World War Jeeps with money given to him by his grandmother for his birthday. He restored them and sold them at a profit, using the money to buy more vehicles and a tank. Wheatcroft sleeps in a bed once owned by Adolf Hitler but says "I've changed the mattress".
