= The Lost Generation (book) =

The Lost Generation: The Brilliant but Tragic Lives of Rising British F1 Stars Roger Williamson, Tony Brise and Tom Pryce
- Original front cover. Pictured from left to right are: Tony Brise, Tom Pryce & Roger Williamson.
- Author: David Tremayne
- Language: English
- Subject: Autosport
- Genre: Biography
- Publisher: Haynes Group
- Publication date: August 2006
- Publication place: United Kingdom
- Pages: 264
- ISBN: 1-84425-205-1
- OCLC: 122715189
- LC Class: GV1032.A1 T745 2006

The Lost Generation: The Brilliant but Tragic Lives of Rising British F1 Stars Roger Williamson, Tony Brise and Tom Pryce (ISBN 1-844-25205-1) is a book written by David Tremayne. The book is biography of three British Formula One drivers: Tony Brise, Tom Pryce and Roger Williamson, who all died after a short period in Formula One.

With access to the drivers' families, friends and colleagues, Tremayne tells the full story of all three drivers. The book is 264 pages long and published by Haynes Group in August 2006.

== Critical response ==
Simon Arron, writing in The Daily Telegraph describes the book as "thoroughly researched and beautifully written by an author who fully appreciates his subjects' worth" Andrew Baker writing for the same paper also praises the book, commenting that the Tremayne is "well placed to draw sympathetic portraits of the trio" and that "motor racing fans will find it heart-warming and moving by turn." Keith Collantine reviewed the book for Auto Trader, and commented that Tremayne "has done justice to a very awkward subject matter" awarding the book a score of 8 out of 10.

Joe Saward on GrandPrix.com said that "David Tremayne has done a wonderful job to bring the characters to life." On the automotive website CarKeys.co.uk, David Finlay praises the author for his "simple, undramatic way" of writing making the book "all the more moving as a result" and sums it up as "an even-handed and worthy monument to three men who are now almost forgotten."
