= Claire Williams =

Former deputy team principal of Williams F1 Team

Claire Williams OBE
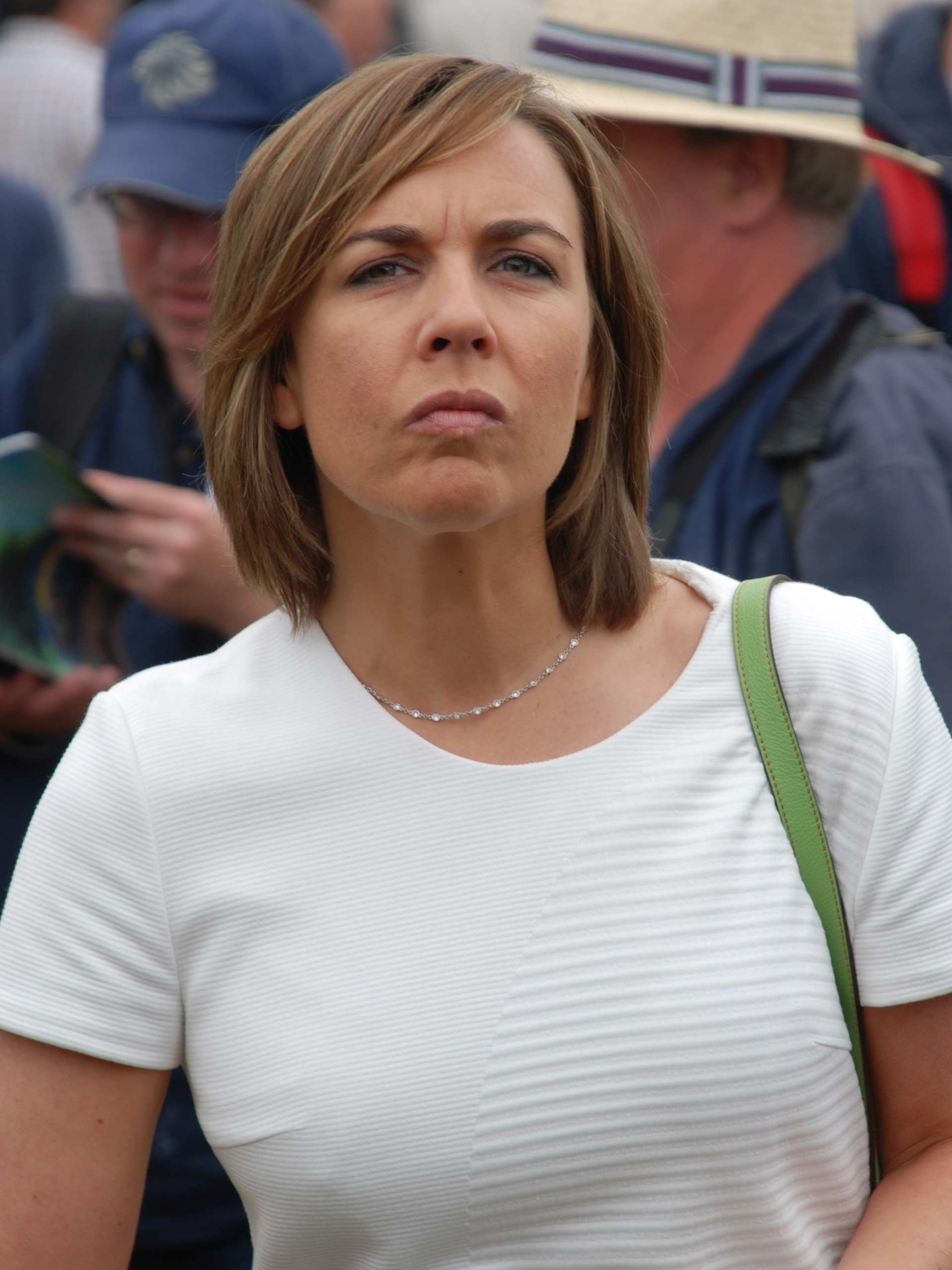
- Williams in 2016
- Born: Claire Victoria Williams; 21 July 1976 (age 50); Windsor, Berkshire, England
- Education: Newcastle University
- Occupation: Deputy team principal of Williams Racing (2013–2020)
- Spouse: Marc Harris (m. 2018)
- Children: 1
- Father: Sir Frank Williams

Claire Victoria Williams OBE (born 21 July 1976) is a British former motorsport executive who was the deputy team principal of the Williams Formula One racing team from 2013 to 2020. She is the second of only two women to have ever managed teams in Formula One, the first being Monisha Kaltenborn of Sauber. In 2023, she became a brand ambassador for WAE Technologies, an R&D off-shoot of the racing team.

== Early life ==
Claire Victoria Williams was born on 21 July 1976 in Windsor, Berkshire. She is the daughter of Sir Frank Williams and Virginia, Lady Williams. She graduated from Newcastle University in 1999 with a degree in politics.

== Career ==
After graduation, Williams became a press officer for the Silverstone racing circuit. In 2002, she joined the Williams F1 team as a Communications Officer and became Head of Communications in 2010. In March 2011, she took on the position of Head of Investor Relations to supplement her role in the communications team, playing a lead role as Williams moved from private to public ownership through listing on the Frankfurt Stock Exchange in 2011. In 2012, she was promoted to Director of Marketing & Communications. When Frank Williams stepped down in March 2012, Claire became the Williams family representative on the board. In March 2013, she was appointed deputy team principal of the Williams F1 racing team. In this role, she was de facto team boss and assumed the day-to-day running of the team from her father.

Taking over after some of the worst years in the team's history, Williams replaced the race drivers, signing Felipe Massa alongside Valtteri Bottas and restructuring the engineering department. The team also switched to Mercedes engines and became a test-bed for the development of hybrid technology in engines and kinetic energy recovery systems, known as KERS. Williams also increased the team's racing budget by securing profitable corporate sponsorships, factors that helped the team to something of a renaissance between 2014 and 2017, when it finished third twice and then fifth twice.

Under her leadership, Williams F1 launched initiatives guiding students into engineering careers, redeveloped the team's work with its official charity, the Spinal Injuries Association, and supported F1's sustainability strategy through the expansion of WAE Technologies. George Russell thanked her for giving him his F1 break when he changed to Mercedes.

A keen advocate for greater diversity and inclusion within her team and across the sport, Williams wanted to use her position to change attitudes within motor racing, and to bring more women into motorsport and engineering. She appointed female drivers Susie Wolff and Jamie Chadwick to development roles, set up a female ambassadors in schools initiative, supported the UK government's Women in Innovation scheme, created workplace opportunities for minority groups, promoted STEM subjects for female students and increased the proportion of women at Williams to 17.6%, the highest in the F1 paddock. She was also a patron of F1 in Schools and an ambassador for Dare to be Different.

Williams was appointed Officer of the Order of the British Empire (OBE) for services to Formula 1 racing in the 2016 Birthday Honours.

Faced with the economic impact of the pandemic plus commercial terms that increasingly favoured the big teams, Williams was forced to put the team up for sale in order to secure its future, subsequently selling to private investment firm Dorilton Capital in August 2020. On 3 September 2020, Williams announced she was resigning as deputy team principal of the Williams team after the 2020 Italian Grand Prix. Before the race, at the Williams motorhome, she was given the front wing of a Williams FW36 as a souvenir.

== Personal life ==
On 5 April 2017, Williams announced that she was pregnant with her first child, a boy. She gave birth to her son in October 2017. In January 2018, Williams announced her marriage to Marc Harris.
