= The Wheatcroft Collection =

UK military vehicle collection

The Wheatcroft Collection in the United Kingdom is a large and important collection of historical softskin and armoured military vehicles. It is located in Leicestershire, England, and is one of the largest private collections of military vehicles in the world.

== Items in the collection ==
The collection has around 200 items, including more than 130 vehicles, of which 88 are tanks. The majority of the collection is of German, American and British origin, with a smaller number of vehicles from Norway, Japan, France, Russia and Sweden. The owner of the collection, Kevin Wheatcroft, has been collecting military vehicles for 30 years.

=== Allied WWII vehicles ===
Amongst the projects being undertaken is the restoration of ten M4 Sherman tanks, bringing the total number of Shermans in the collection to 15. Each of the ten are planned to receive a matching engine correct for the variant. Eight early Wright Continental R975 C1 radial engines were found in a barn, and subsequently purchased for the collection, all are scheduled to be restored. Another R975 was sourced from South Africa, described as being in mint condition.

Existing Shermans include an 'Easy Eight', with cast chassis (likely mid production M4A1), D82081 (T23) turret, 76mm gun (with muzzle brake), HVSS suspension, and sharp nosed differential cover. The collection is expected to include all major Sherman variants and an M10 tank destroyer once restorations are complete.

The collection also includes two Churchill tanks.

=== German WWII vehicles ===
The Wheatcroft Collection is perhaps notable for having a number of rare Second World War-era German military vehicles, including four Panther tanks, one of which is close to full restoration, a StuG III assault gun, a Panzer III, and a Panzer IV tank and various components from many other vehicles. Four Jagdpanzers are currently undergoing restoration. The collection is also working on restoring the only surviving German E Boat.

== Exhibition and events ==
The collection is not available for public viewing. The owner intends to eventually restore and preserve many of the vehicles, and then place them in a museum.
