= Donington Grand Prix Collection =

Racing car museum

Coordinates: 52°49′38″N 1°21′58″W

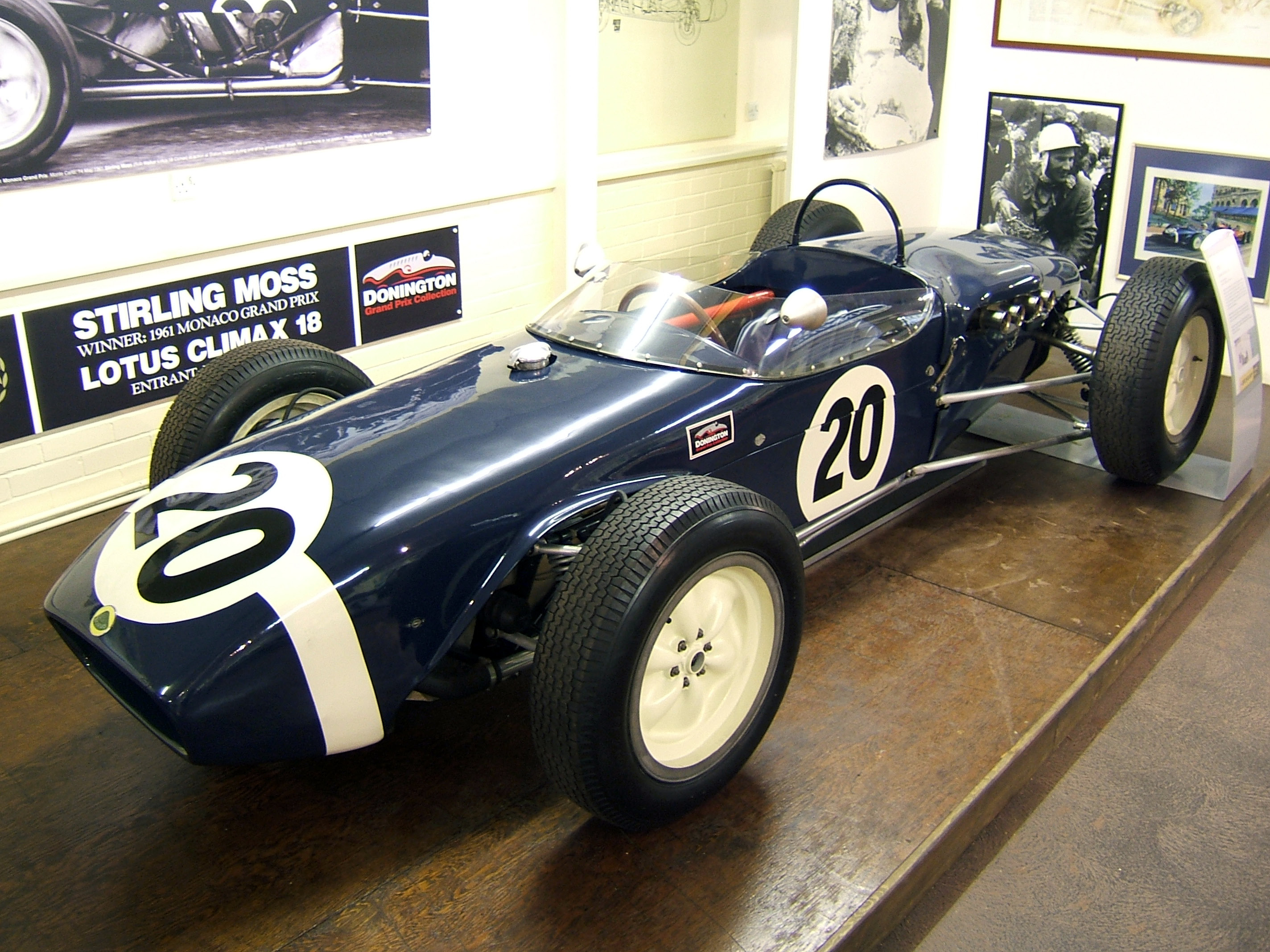
Stirling Moss's 1961 Monaco Grand Prix-winning Lotus 18, one of the Donington Grand Prix Collection's most famous exhibits

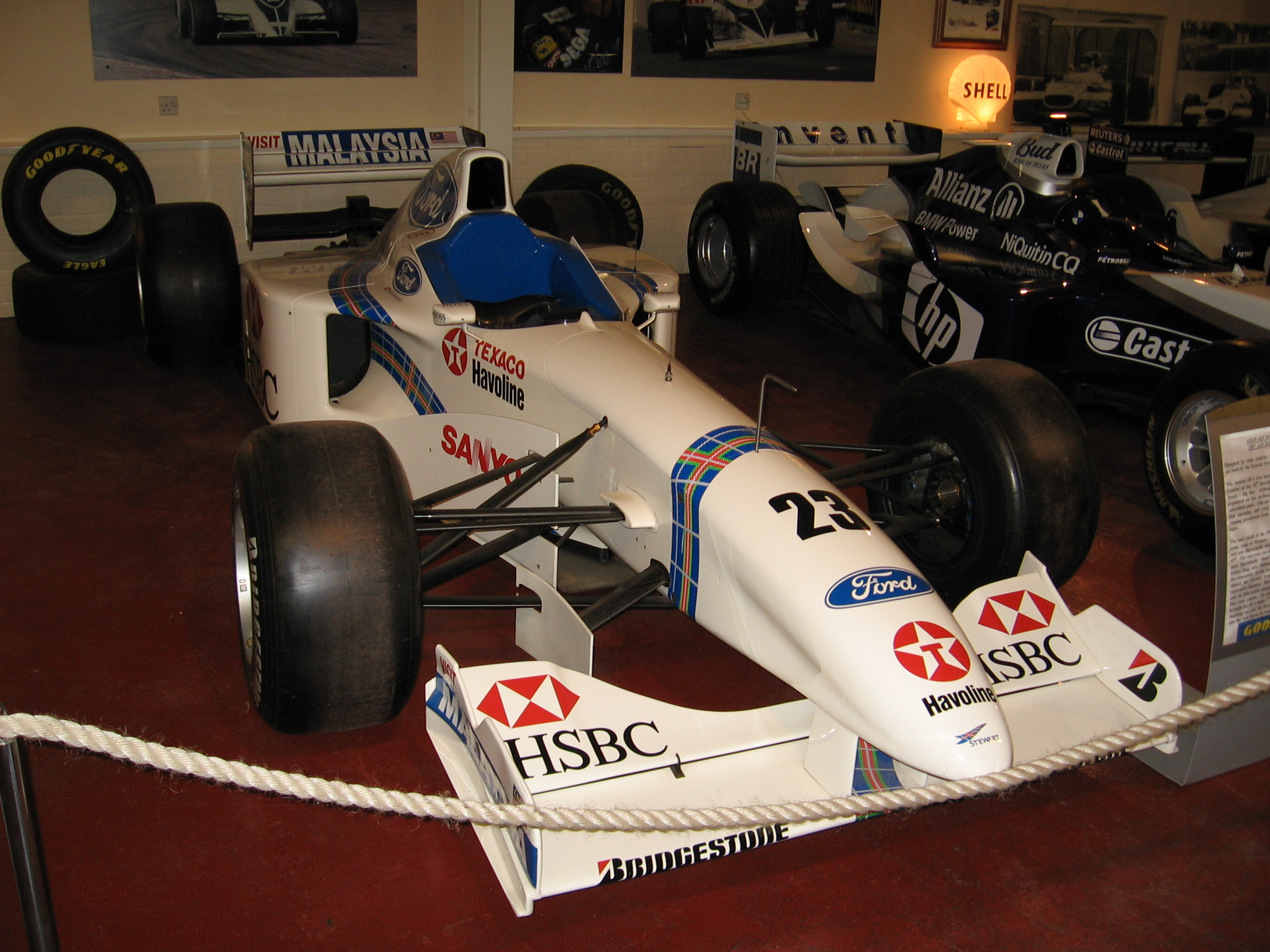
A Jan Magnussen Stewart SF1, an example of the range and depth of machinery in the collection

The Donington Grand Prix Collection, sometime known as the Donington Grand Prix Exhibition, was a museum of motor racing cars, based at the Donington Park motor racing circuit in Leicestershire, England. The collection, which started in the 1960s, began to deplete in the 2000s. The museum closed permanently on 5 November 2018 (7 years ago), its large collection was sold, and loaned cars returned to their owners.

== Overview ==
With five halls and over 130 exhibits, the Donington Grand Prix Collection comprised the largest exhibition of Grand Prix cars in the world. The collection contained vehicles from many forms of open-wheel, single-seater racing, but was primarily focussed on Grand Prix and Formula One machinery. The museum was formed by the late Tom Wheatcroft in March 1973 and is based on Wheatcroft's personal collection of vehicles. These include some that Wheatcroft's own motor racing team ran for drivers such as Roger Williamson and Derek Bell, although many cars exhibited are on loan from other owners. Various external collections of automobilia and motor racing ephemera have been donated to the museum over the years.

Specific attractions included the world's only complete collection of Vanwall cars, a near-complete collection of McLaren Formula One cars from the team's inception to the early 2000s, and extensive collections of Williams and BRM cars (including examples of both notorious BRM V16-powered machines as well as the H16-powered BRM P83). The collection also had examples of four different four-wheel drive Formula One cars, including an unraced Cosworth car. Another star exhibit was the Lotus 18 with which Stirling Moss won the 1961 Monaco Grand Prix, along with Jim Clark's World Championship-winning Lotus 25. Noticeable, however, was the distinct lack of Ferrari vehicles, 3 in all, but fine examples nonetheless. First being a Ferrari 312 driven by Chris Amon, second a 312B and thirdly, a Ferrari F1-2000 (the particular chassis driven to victory in the 2000 Canadian Grand Prix, one of nine victories for Michael Schumacher in his maiden championship winning series with Ferrari), conversely, the establishment housed the Jordan 191 in which he made his formula 1 debut in 1991. The 1998 Jordan 198, the most successful in Jordan's history, (the chassis being the one Damon Hill drove to victory in a 1–2 with teammate Ralf Schumacher at the 1998 Belgian Grand Prix at Spa Francorchamps) also figured. Another interesting exhibit was an Auto Union, built from pre-war plans following the factory's destruction by Allied bombing during World War II. Wheatcroft had also supplemented the racing car collection with some additional notable cars, including a replica of the personal Bugatti Royale of Ettore Bugatti.

Augmenting the car collections were the world's largest collection of motor racing helmets; Fangio, Graham Hill, Mansell, Hunt and Alonso amongst others, a small collection of racing motorcycles, including a Daijiro Kato Honda and a Barry Sheene Heron Texaco Suzuki and a number of collections of trophies and awards gained by a selection of British drivers and riders. In addition to exhibits, the Donington Grand Prix Collection museum also incorporated a conference suite and gift shop.

In 2007, the owner began an attempt to bring Formula 1 back to Donington Park, however the deal collapsed. The Donington Grand Prix Collection was closed briefly in late 2009 in the wake of the death of Tom Wheatcroft, and Donington Ventures Leisure Ltd. entered administration under leadership of his son Kevin Wheatcroft. It reopened in January 2010, along with the cafe and race control offices. The museum began to sell items to help fund various costs. They sold the Jim Clark Lotus 25 c.2008 to an unknown private collector. Several other Formula 1 cars also disappeared from the museum including Jackie Stewart's 1973 championship winning Tyrrell 006, a Lotus 72 and a Ferrari F1-2000. These cars may have been sold in order to solve Donington's financial problems when it enlarged the circuit and attempted to host the 2012 British Grand Prix.

== The McLaren Hall ==
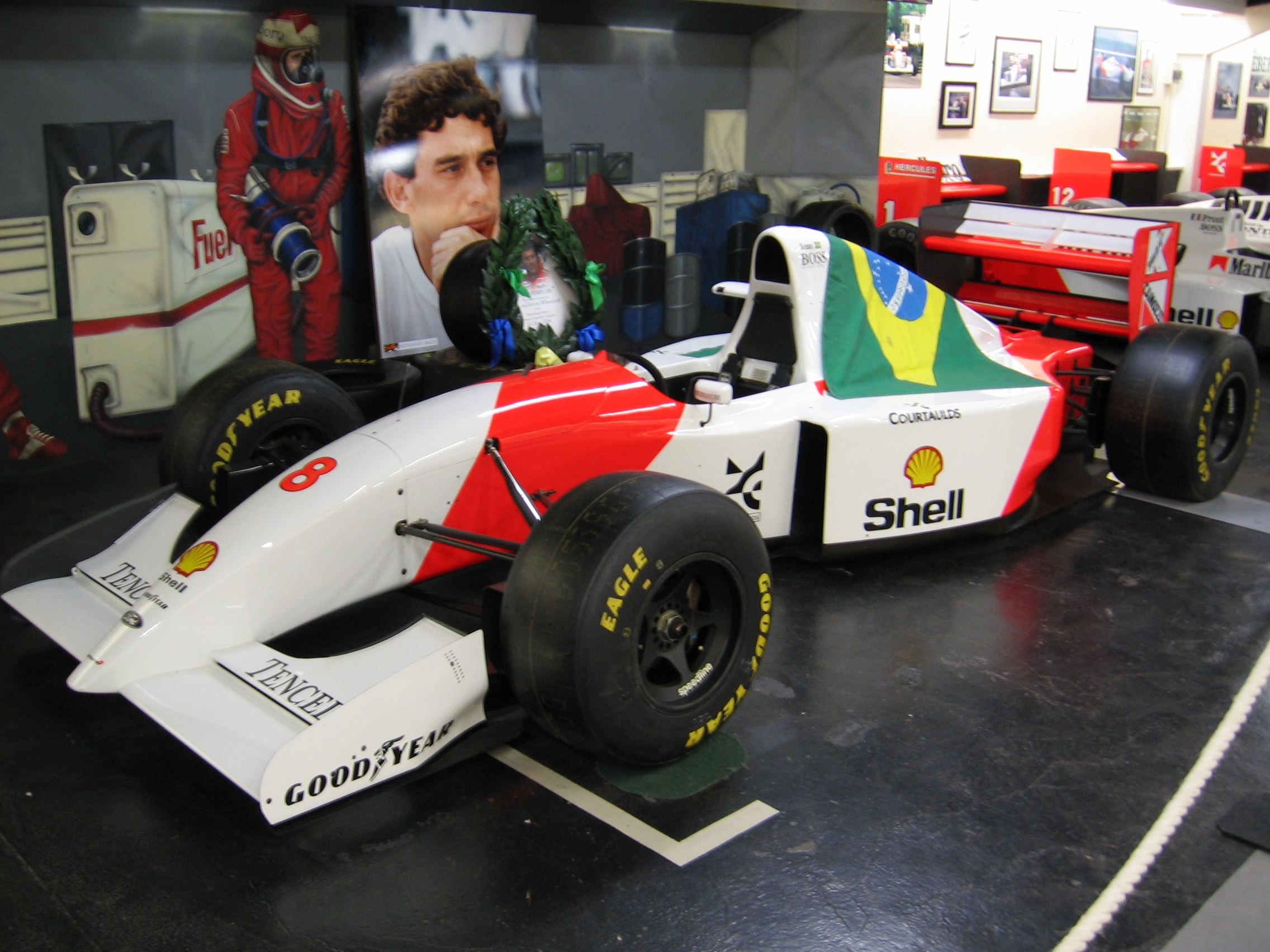
Ayrton Senna's MP4/8 from the 1993 European Grand Prix held at Donington

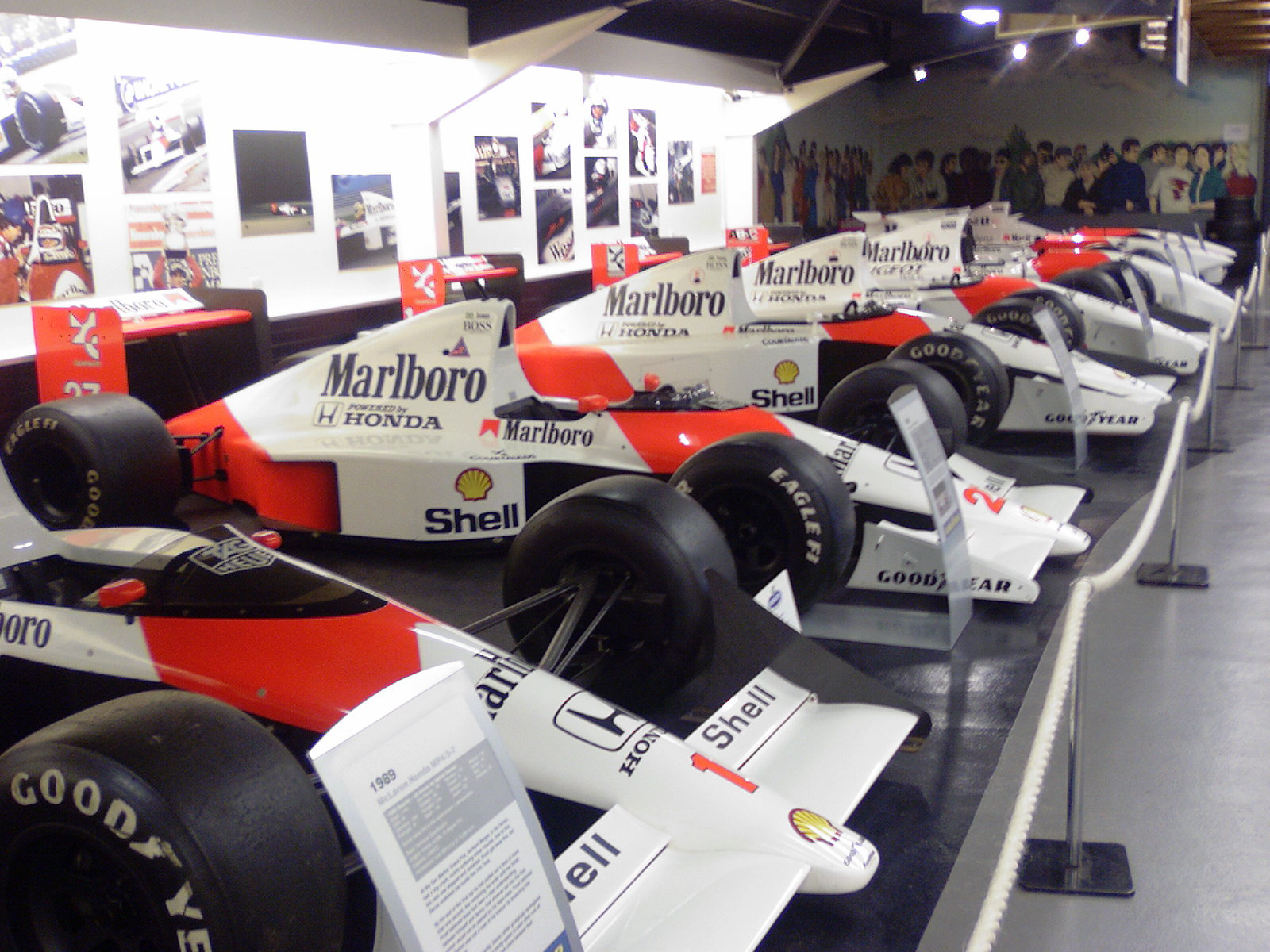
Part of McLaren Hall at Donington Grand Prix Collection

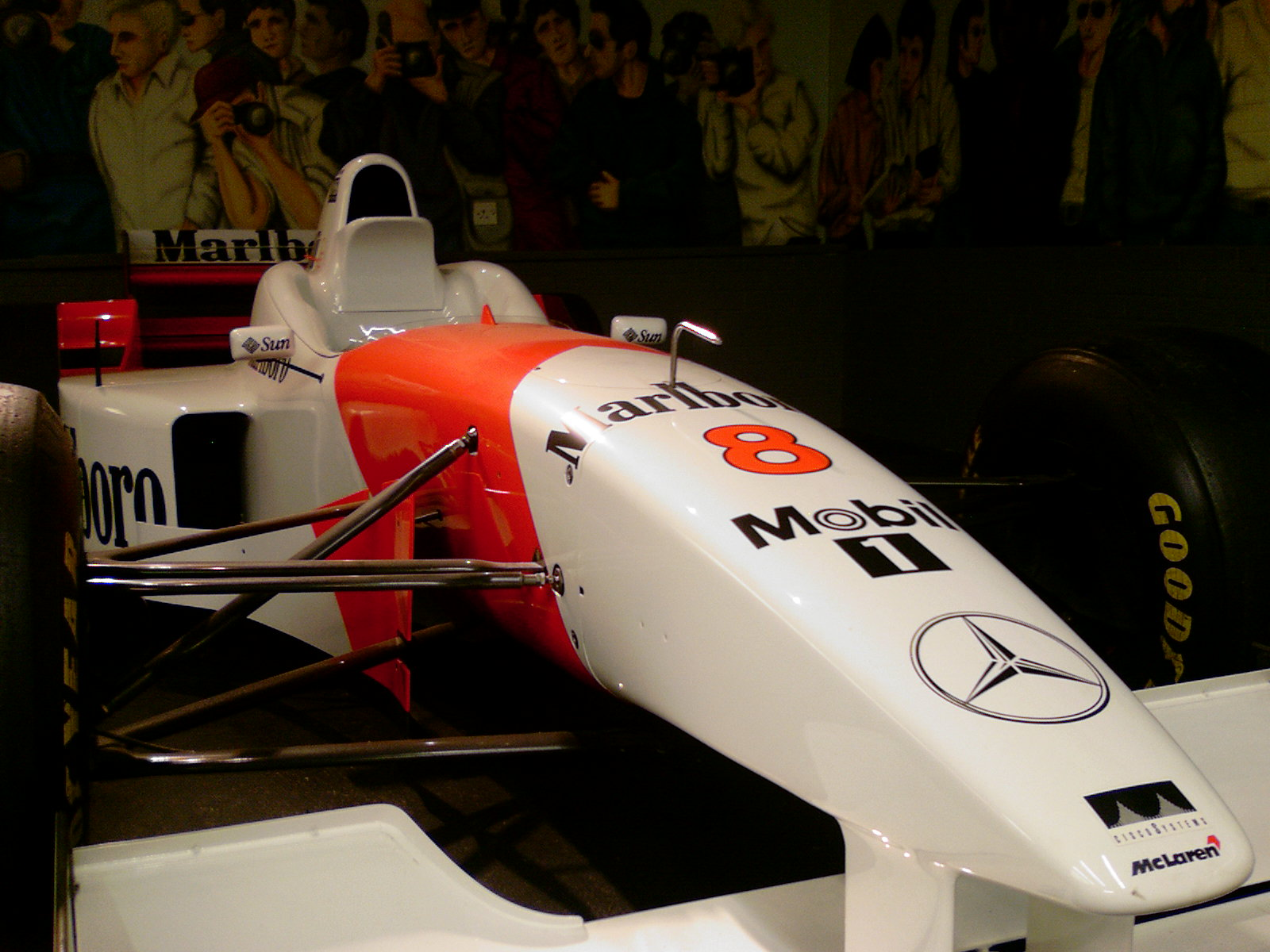
David Coulthard's MP4/11 in the McLaren Hall at Donington Grand Prix Collection

The Donington Collection was home to the largest exhibition (being almost comprehensive of the 1970s, 1980s and 1990s) of McLaren vehicles. Highlights of the collection included the #1 McLaren M23 driven by Formula 1 World Champion James Hunt in 1977, the McLaren MP4/14 chassis number 4, untouched after crossing the line and affirming Mika Häkkinen as 1999 Formula 1 World Champion, also, the 1993 MP4/8 driven to victory by Ayrton Senna on location at the 1993 European Grand Prix. An MP4/4, designed by Steve Nichols carrying chassis number 3 and being the only example of said model to not win a Grand Prix stood in an exhibition of the all conquering McLaren of the 1988 Formula One season. Conversely, its lacklustre predecessor, the MP4/3 TAG Porsche twin-turbo also designed by Nichols, stood alongside it in a diachronic exhibition of McLaren creations. In addition, rarities such as a Häkkinen's MP4/13 in test livery (prior to the unveiling of their new sponsorship ahead of the 1998 season), an M14A driven by Denny Hulme and an MP4/2, the car that took Alain Prost to his first World Drivers' Championship in 1985. Alongside these lay helmets of great drivers who drove for the Woking-based outfit over the years such as Senna, Prost, Lauda, Häkkinen, Berger and Coulthard.

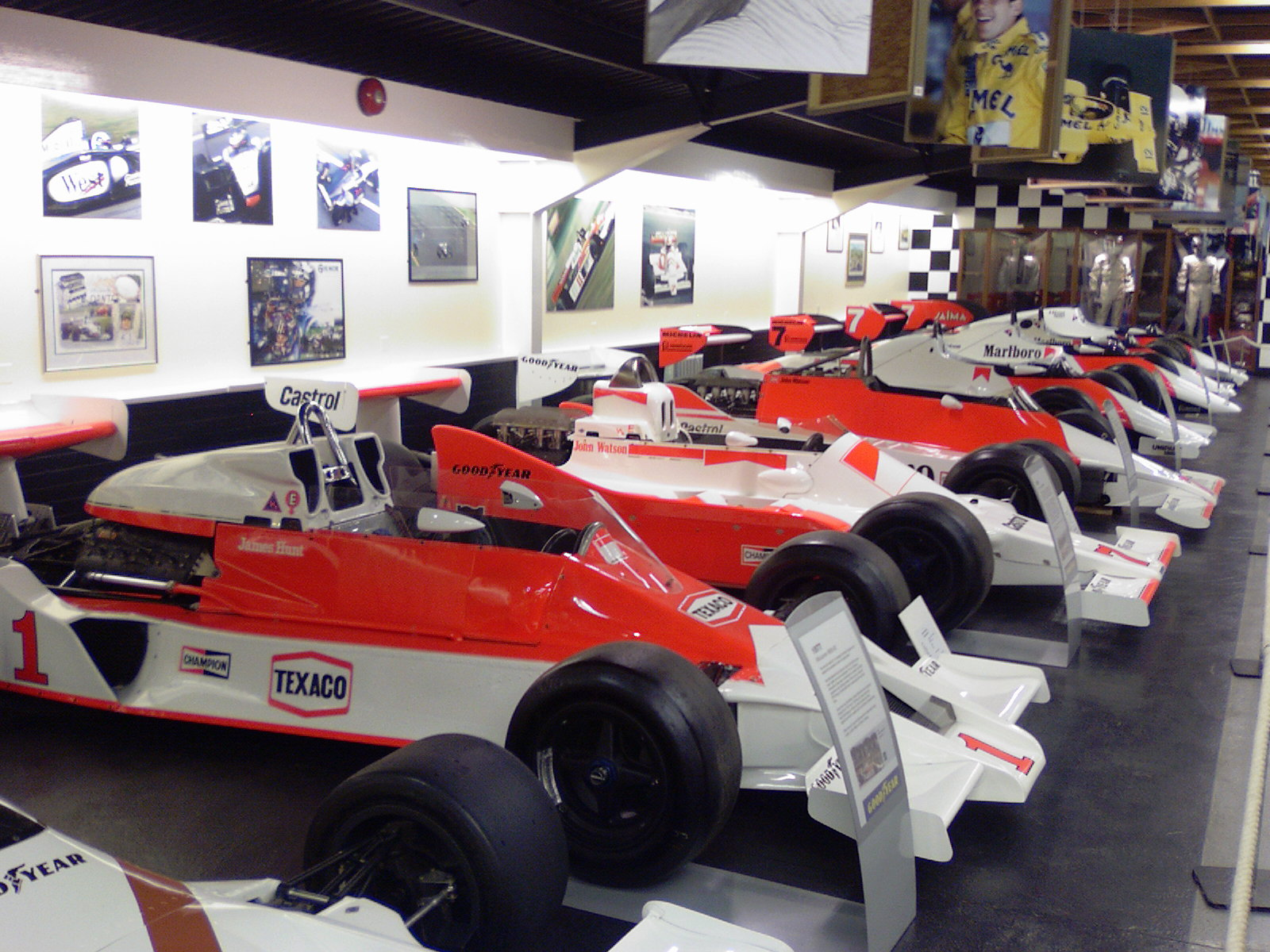
Part of McLaren Hall at Donington Grand Prix Collection

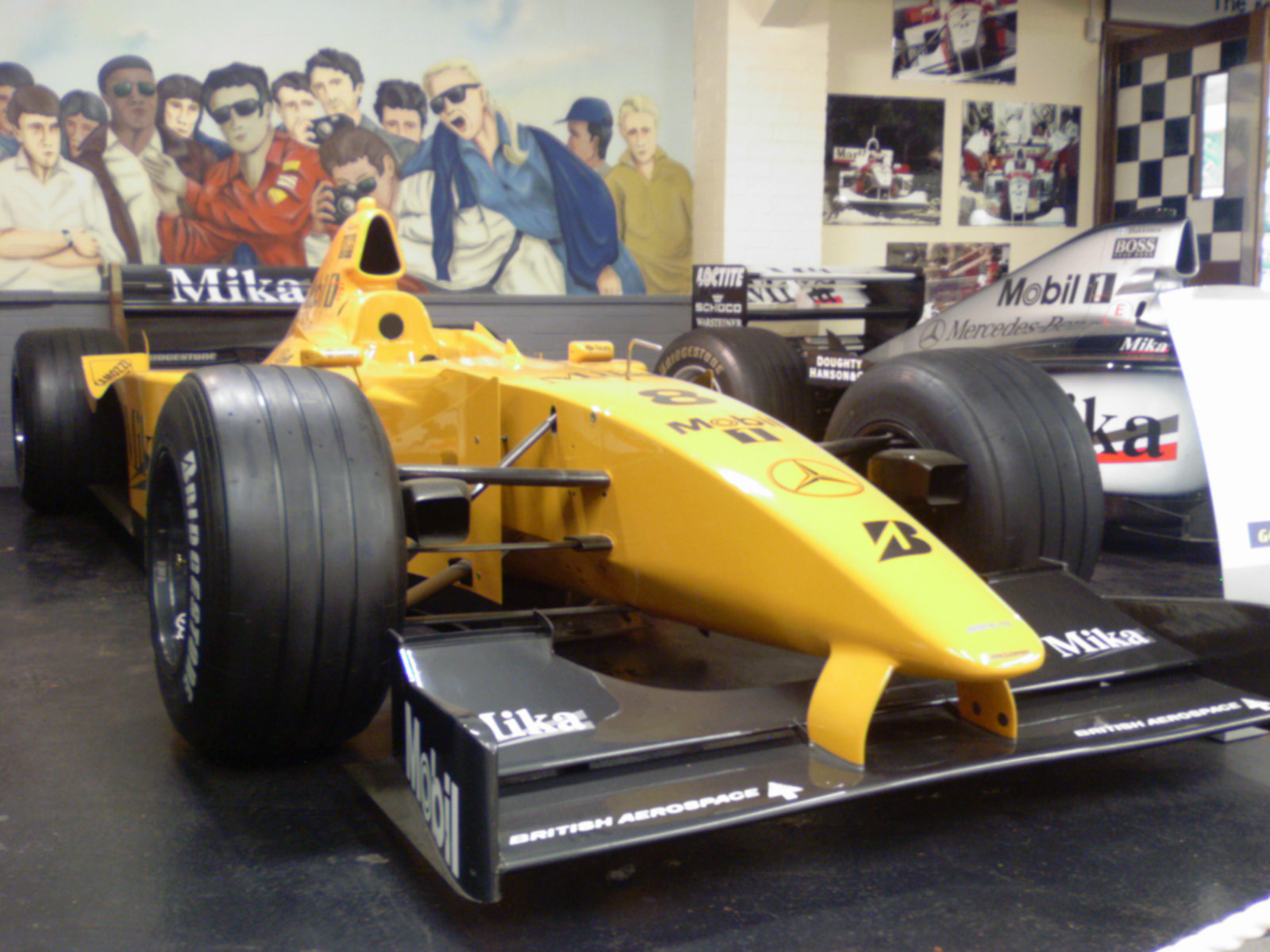
Mika Häkkinen's MP4/13 in test livery in the McLaren Hall at Donington Grand Prix Collection

== See also ==
- Grand Prix Museum, Macau
