= Frank Williams (Formula One) =

British businessman and motorsport executive (1942–2021)

Sir Frank Williams CBE
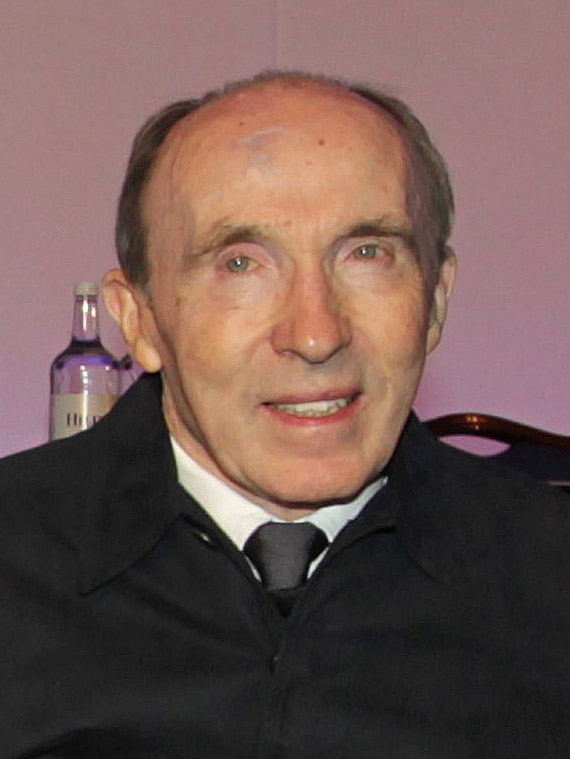
- Williams in 2011
- Born: Francis Owen Garbett Williams; 16 April 1942; South Shields, Durham, England
- Died: 28 November 2021 (aged 79); Frimley, Surrey, England
- Education: St Joseph's College, Dumfries
- Occupations: Businessman; motorsport executive; racing driver
- Employers: European Formula Two; Frank Williams (1968); Formula One; Frank Williams (1969–1976); Williams (1977–2020)
- Title: Team Principal
- Spouse: Virginia Berry (m. 1974; died 2013)
- Children: 3, including Claire
- Awards: Knight of the Legion of Honour; Wheatcroft Trophy

Sir Francis Owen Garbett Williams (16 April 1942 – 28 November 2021) was a British businessman, motorsport executive and racing driver. From 1977 to 2020, Williams served as co-founder, team principal and co-owner of Williams in Formula One, winning nine World Constructors' Championship titles between 1980 and 1997.

== Early life ==
On 16 April 1942, Williams was born in South Shields, County Durham. At the time, his father served as an active Royal Air Force officer, while his mother worked as a school teacher. Williams was partly raised by his aunt and uncle in Jarrow, after the breakdown of his parents' marriage.

He subsequently spent much of his later childhood at a private boarding school, St Joseph's College, Dumfries, Scotland. In the late 1950s, a friend gave Williams a ride in his Jaguar XK150, which immediately served to catalyse his interest in fast cars.

== Motorsports career ==
After a brief career as a driver and mechanic, Williams founded Frank Williams Racing Cars in 1966, funded by his work as a travelling grocery salesman. He ran drivers, including Piers Courage, for several years in Formula Two and Formula Three. Williams purchased a Brabham Formula One chassis, which Courage drove throughout the 1969 Formula One season, twice finishing in second place.

In 1970, Williams undertook a brief partnership with Alejandro de Tomaso. After the death of Courage at that year's Dutch Grand Prix, Williams's relationship with de Tomaso ended. In 1971, he raced Henri Pescarolo with a chassis purchased from March Engineering; 1972 saw the first F1 car built by the Williams works, the Politoys FX3 designed by Len Bailey. Pescarolo crashed and destroyed it at its first race.

Williams, short on cash and conducting team business from a telephone box after being disconnected for unpaid bills, looked to Marlboro and Iso Rivolta, an Italian car company, for sponsorship. Though they pledged their support, they did not come through in time. In 1976, Williams took on a partner in Canadian oil magnate Walter Wolf. Though the team continued functioning, it no longer belonged to Williams. He left in 1977, along with one of his employees, engineer Patrick Head. The two partners acquired an empty carpet warehouse in Didcot, Oxfordshire, and announced the formation of Williams Grand Prix Engineering, a new team to compete in Formula One. Frank hired Neil Oatley, a graduate at the time, to operate as a cartographer for Patrick Head's drawings. Later, he brought in Frank Dernie formerly of Hesketh Racing who added additional knowledge with suspension geometry, aerodynamics and the ability to write his own computer programs (an extremely rare skill at the time).

The team's first win came when Clay Regazzoni drove the Cosworth-powered Williams FW07 to victory at the 1979 British Grand Prix at Silverstone. Their first Drivers' Championship and Constructors' Championship both came in 1980, with the Australian Alan Jones winning the drivers' title. Between 1981 and 1997, the team won six more drivers' championships and eight more constructors' championships. He also oversaw the team claim a total of 114 Grand Prix victories.

In May 1994, following the death of Ayrton Senna in the Williams FW16 at Imola, Williams was charged with manslaughter in Italy, but was acquitted in 1997. After Senna's death, every chassis from the 1995 Williams FW17 until 2021 carried a tribute in the form of a small Senna logo on its front wing supports, or nearby.

In March 2012, Williams announced he would be stepping down from the board of Williams F1 and would be replaced by his daughter Claire Williams, although he would still remain with the team in the role of team principal. Williams ceased to have any involvement with the Williams team when it was sold in September 2020.

== Personal life and death ==
Williams met Virginia Berry in 1967. They married in 1974. They had two sons, Jonathan and Jaime, and a daughter, Claire, who would go on to become the deputy team principal of his future Formula One team Williams Grand Prix Engineering.

Williams used a wheelchair following a car accident in the South of France, on 8 March 1986, which rendered him tetraplegic. He was driving with team sponsorship manager Peter Windsor in a hired Ford Sierra from the Paul Ricard Circuit to Nice Côte d'Azur Airport when the incident happened. Williams had been at the circuit to watch the testing of the team's new Williams FW11, but as a keen long-distance runner, he was returning to the airport following the trials because he wished to compete in a half marathon in London the next day.

During the drive to the airport, he lost control of the hire car on a slight left-hand kink in the road, clipping a low stone wall, causing the vehicle to leave the highway. An eight-foot (2.4 m) drop between the road and a field caused the car to roll onto the driver's side. Williams remained conscious but was immediately aware that he could not move and feared fire due to fuel spillage. After being pressed between his seat and the crushed roof, he suffered a spinal fracture between the fourth and fifth vertebra. Windsor, who had sustained only minor injuries, extracted Williams from the vehicle while waiting for the emergency services. Virginia flew with Patrick Head to the French hospital and believed that Williams was about to die. She organised his urgent repatriation to England, where doctors at Royal London Hospital performed a tracheotomy, which then allowed his lungs to be drained of fluid, almost certainly saving his life. Williams required constant care and physical dependence on others as a consequence of the accident.

Virginia wrote an autobiographical book published in 1991, A Different Kind of Life, in which she describes her experiences in the Formula One team's formative years and her husband's near-fatal accident. For his part, Williams decided not to read her account during her lifetime, preferring to leave the past in the past. She was diagnosed with cancer in 2010, and died on 7 March 2013, at the age of 66.

Williams was admitted to hospital in Frimley, Surrey on 26 November 2021, and died two days later, on the morning of 28 November, at the age of 79.

Sir Frank Williams was one of the kindest people I had the pleasure of meeting in this sport. What he achieved is something truly special. Until his last days I know he remained a racer and a fighter at heart. His legacy will live on forever.

— Sir Lewis Hamilton

== Awards and honours ==
Williams was appointed a Commander of the Order of the British Empire (CBE) by Queen Elizabeth II in the 1987 New Year Honours, and received a knighthood in the 1999 New Year Honours "For services to the Motor Sport Industry." He was appointed a Knight of the Legion of Honour by France, for his achievements with Renault F1's engines. Williams received the Wheatcroft Trophy in 2008, in recognition of his significant contributions to motorsports.

In 2010, he was awarded the Helen Rollason Award for outstanding achievement in the face of adversity at the BBC Sports Personality of the Year awards. Williams was added to the Motor Sport Hall of Fame as a member in 2011. In 2012, a new road in Didcot, Oxfordshire, was named Sir Frank Williams Avenue.

Formula One teams paid tribute to Williams by running a special livery of the Frank Williams Racing Cars logo at the 2021 Saudi Arabian Grand Prix (the next race after his death), and a moment of silence was held before the start of the race. MurWalls created a 56 ft (17 m)-long mural bearing a 7 ft (2.1 m)-high portrait of Williams at the Silverstone Circuit ahead of the 2022 British Grand Prix. A memorial mass of thanksgiving for Williams took place at Westminster Cathedral in London on 4 July 2022, attended by more than 600 individuals. The Frank Williams Memorial Trophy for Masters Racing Legends race for 3.0-litre Formula One cars that competed between 1966 and 1985 was held in tribute to him in the Silverstone Classic at Silverstone late in August 2022.

=== Orders and special awards ===
- United Kingdom
  - Commander of the Order of the British Empire (1986)
  - Knight Bachelor (1999)
- France
  - Knight of the Legion of Honour
