= Tom Wheatcroft =

English businessman

- Born: Frederick Bernard Wheatcroft; 8 May 1922; Castle Donington, Leicestershire, England
- Died: 31 October 2009 (aged 87); Arnesby, Leicestershire, England
- Occupations: Businessman, car collector
- Spouses: Helena Morgenstern (m. 1946): Sheila Wheatcroft
- Children: Kevin Wheatcroft and 6 others

Frederick Bernard "Tom" Wheatcroft (8 May 1922 – 31 October 2009) was an English businessman and car collector. He made his fortune through building and construction, and was known for resurrecting the Donington Park motor racing circuit and founding the Donington Grand Prix Collection museum.

== Biography ==
Frederick Bernard Wheatcroft was born in the market town of Castle Donington, Leicestershire, in 1922. Early in life he was nicknamed 'Tom-Tom' by an uncle, owing to his habit of repeatedly patting his stomach, and the name stuck with him for the rest of his life. Wheatcroft had only 20 months of formal schooling, and following the end of this he became an apprentice plasterer. However, he preferred to bicycle from his parents home in Leicester to Donington Park to watch pre-war motor racing. He was in attendance at the circuit during the 1937 and 1938 Donington Grand Prix races:

You had to be there to know what it was like. The W125 Mercs and the V16 Auto Union racing cars were doing 170mph by halfway down the straight. The noise and the smell and the speed – we hadn't seen anything like it before.

During World War II Wheatcroft served as a tank driver. He saw action in many theatres, including Madagascar, India and the Middle East, and was a part of the Allied invasion of Italy. Toward the end of the conflict he was invalided home after he was temporarily blinded by a nearby mortar explosion. Following the end of the war Wheatcroft returned to the construction industry as a labourer. When a storm caused significant damage to parts of Leicester he organised repairs.

Using the money made from this he funded the construction of two houses, and from there he rapidly built a thriving construction business, Bernard Wheatcroft Ltd. In 1946 he married Helena Morgenstern, known to her family as "Lenchen". Wheatcroft had always lived within a 30-mile radius of Castle Donington, had by his death had amassed an estimate fortune of £120 million, and was father to seven children.

== Motor sport activities ==
Following on from his childhood passion for motor racing, after Wheatcroft's construction business started to provide a stable source of income he returned to visiting race events as a spectator. In 1964 he bought an elderly Ferrari 125 Formula One car, formerly owned and driven by Peter Whitehead. Despite having had its Ferrari V12 engine replaced by a Chevrolet Corvette V8 by the previous owner in Australia, Wheatcroft enjoyed driving the car at test sessions. The car sparked a buying spree and formed the first of what was to become a major collection of Grand Prix machinery. Over the following years Wheatcroft and his distinctive laugh – described by historian Doug Nye as "like a rusty truck failing to start" – became a familiar feature at race circuits around the world.

=== Wheatcroft Racing ===
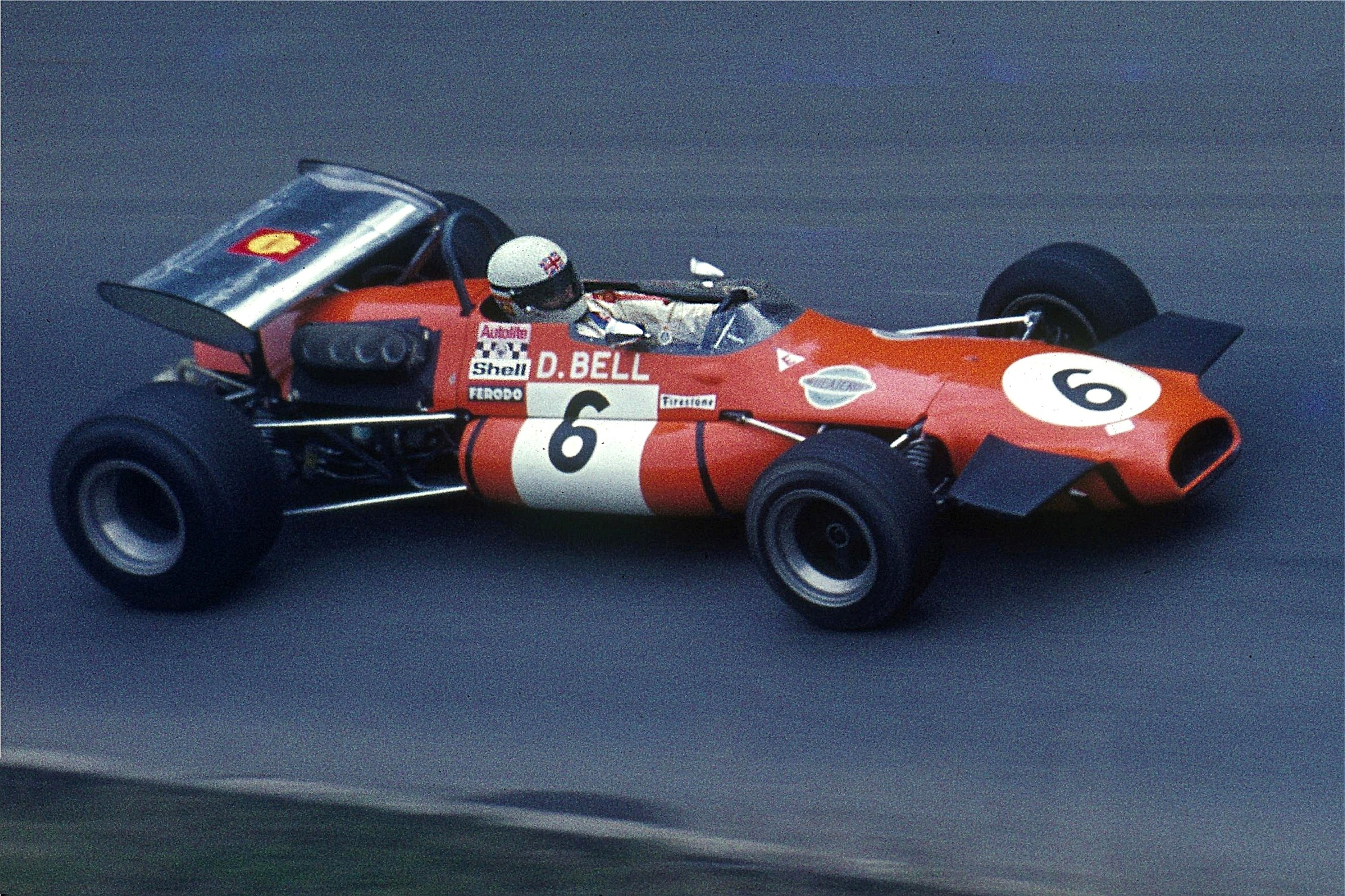
Derek Bell in the Wheatcroft Racing Brabham BT30 at the Nürburgring in 1970

Having made his fortune, and having started to build his car collection, Wheatcroft further indulged his racing passion by running his own racing car team. In 1970 he purchased an ex-works Brabham BT26, Jacky Ickx's 1969 German Grand Prix-winning car, and entered Derek Bell for the Tasman Series' 1970 New Zealand Grand Prix. Bell finished second. Following that initial success, later that year he invested in a new a Brabham BT30 to run for Bell in the European Formula Two Championship. Bell again finished second. During the season he also entered the BT26, in full three-litre form, at the Race of Champions, where Bell suffered an accident in practice, and the Belgian Grand Prix, where the car retired.

At the 1971 Monaco Formula Three race Wheatcroft became acquainted with Roger Williamson, also from Leicester, and began to support his driving career. Driving for Wheatcroft Racing, in 1972 Williamson won two of the three British Formula Three Championships, and took part in numerous European Formula Three and Formula Two races. In 1973 Wheatcroft sponsored a seat for Williamson in the Formula One March Engineering works team, run by Max Mosley. Williamson's short career lasted two races. He crashed on the first lap of his debut, at the ill-fated 1973 British Grand Prix, then again on the eighth lap of the Dutch Grand Prix. Although he was unhurt in the accident the car had flipped over, preventing his escape, and Williamson died in the subsequent fire. Wheatcroft reflected later that "I lost friends in the war but it was nothing like losing The Lad. Wasn't until afterwards you realised how much he meant."

After this Wheatcroft continued to back occasional drivers in Formula Atlantic and Formula Two. He funded the construction of a bespoke Wheatcroft chassis, designed by former BRM designer Mike Pilbeam, and ran 1974 British champion Brian Henton (born in Castle Donington) in selected Formula Two and Atlantic races using it. Henton's best result with the Wheatcroft 002 was third place in the Silverstone Circuit round of the European Formula Two Championship. The two maintained their relationship in 1976, but Wheatcroft's heart wasn't in it and he slowly wound down the team's activities over the year.

==== Complete Formula One World Championship results ====
(key)

Year	Chassis	Engine(s)	Tyres	Drivers	1	2	3	4	5	6	7	8	9	10	11	12	13
1970	Brabham BT26A	Ford Cosworth DFV 3.0 V8	G		RSA	ESP	MON	BEL	NED	FRA	GBR	GER	AUT	ITA	CAN	USA	MEX
1970	Brabham BT26A	Ford Cosworth DFV 3.0 V8	G	(United Kingdom) Derek Bell				Ret									

=== Donington Park ===
In 1971 Wheatcroft bought a large part of the Donington Hall estate, including the remnants of the pre-war racing circuit, for £100,000. The park had been used as a military supply depot during World War II and the circuit was derelict. At his own cost, he rebuilt the circuit over the following six years into Donington Park racetrack. One of his first moves was to move his car collection to the estate. Formerly known as the Donington Grand Prix Exhibition, it was at the time the largest collection of motor racing cars in the world. Racing finally returned to the Donington circuit in 1977, after a hiatus of almost 30 years.

Over the next decade and a half Wheatcroft campaigned tirelessly to hold a Formula One World Championship Grand Prix at Donington. In 1983 he was given a provisional date for the 1988 Formula One season, but when the calendar for that year came to be finalised the RAC Motor Sports Association changed their mind and decided to stage the British Grand Prix at Silverstone instead. At the same time Wheatcroft even explored the potential for holding an Irish Grand Prix at Donington, but this too was vetoed by the RAC MSA.

Finally, in 1993 the European Grand Prix was scheduled to be held at Donington Park. Prior to the race, despite having suffered his third heart attack only the previous week, Wheatcroft himself took the wheel of his own pre-war Mercedes-Benz W154 Grand Prix car for a demonstration run. He spun the car. The 1993 European Grand Prix was held in very wet conditions, but produced a memorable drive from Ayrton Senna. However, having lost money on the event Wheatcroft decided not to pursue a follow-up race the next year.

In 2007, Wheatcroft agreed a 150-year lease of the land on which the circuit and museum are located to Donington Ventures Leisure Ltd., which with his support subsequently won a 10-year agreement from Formula One organisers to host the British Grand Prix from July 2010. However, the project ran out of money and Donington Ventures Leisure Ltd. went out of business.

Tom Wheatcroft died, aged 87, on 31 October 2009 at his home in Arnesby, after a long illness. Wheatcroft's son, Kevin Wheatcroft has followed in his father's footsteps as a collector, establishing The Wheatcroft Collection of military vehicles in Leicester.
