= Roger Williamson =

British racing driver (1948–1973)

- Born: 2 February 1948; Ashby-de-la-Zouch, Leicestershire, England
- Died: 29 July 1973 (aged 25); Zandvoort, North Holland, Netherlands

Formula One World Championship career
- Nationality: (United Kingdom) British
- Active years: 1973
- Team: March
- Entries: 2
- Championships: 0
- Wins: 0
- Podiums: 0
- Career points: 0
- Pole positions: 0
- Fastest laps: 0
- First entry: 1973 British Grand Prix
- Last entry: 1973 Dutch Grand Prix

Roger Williamson (2 February 1948 – 29 July 1973) was a British racing driver and a two time British Formula 3 champion, who died during his second Formula One race, the 1973 Dutch Grand Prix at Zandvoort Circuit in the Netherlands.

== Early life and career ==
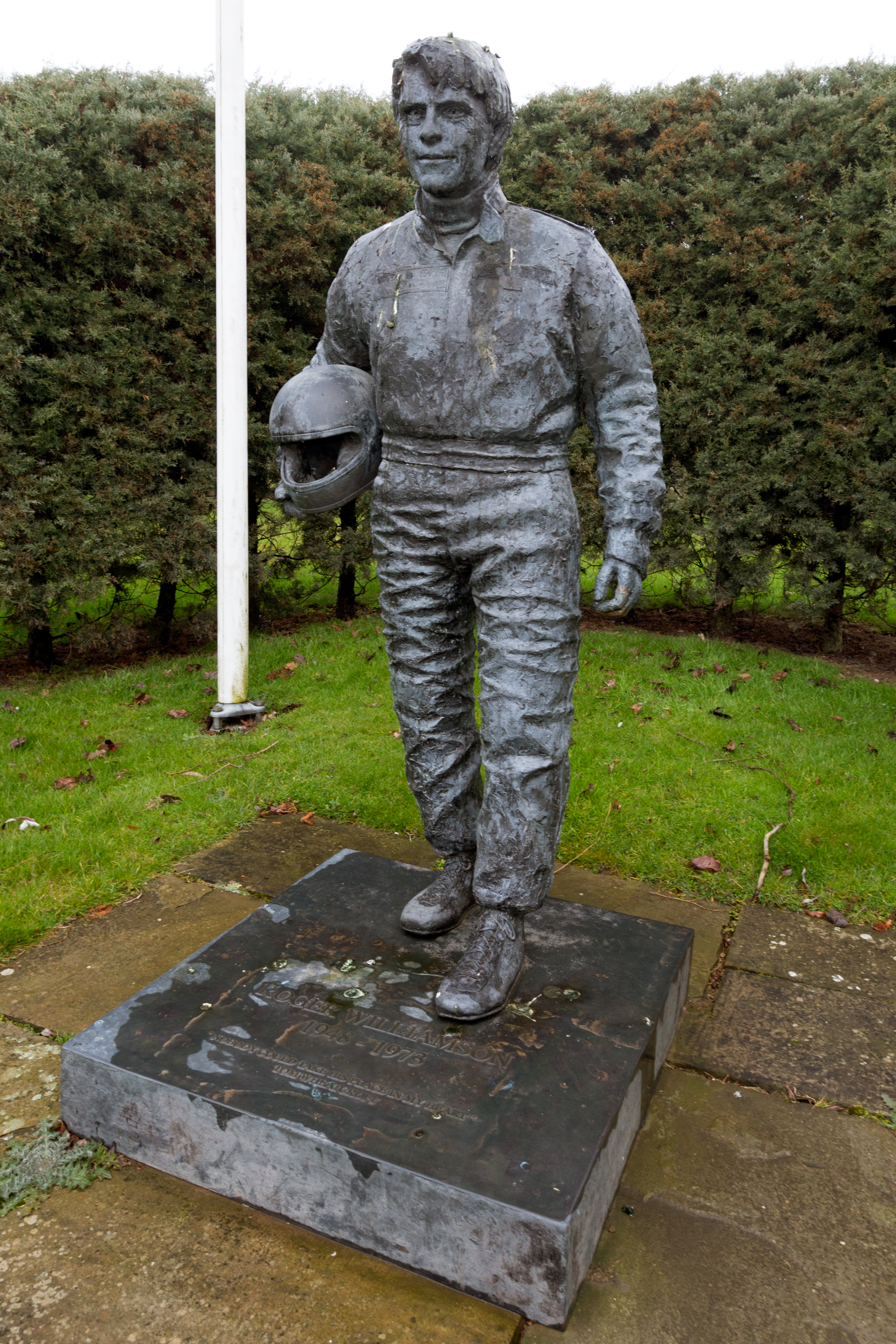
Bronze statue of Roger Williamson at the Donington Park Garden of Remembrance

Williamson was born in Ashby-de-la-Zouch, Leicestershire. He won the 1971 and 1972 British Formula 3 Championship titles. In 1973, he was offered a drive in the March Engineering works Formula One team. Williamson originally tested for the BRM team, but his manager advised him to take the March offer, as March had a slightly stronger performance in the previous season.

Williamson made his Formula One debut at the 1973 British Grand Prix, the ninth round of the season, in which he was involved in a lap one nine car pileup resulting in his retirement. His second appearance came just weeks later at Zandvoort for the Dutch Grand Prix.

== Death ==
External videos
- Footage of David Purley attempting to save Williamson who was trapped in his overturned and burning car on YouTube

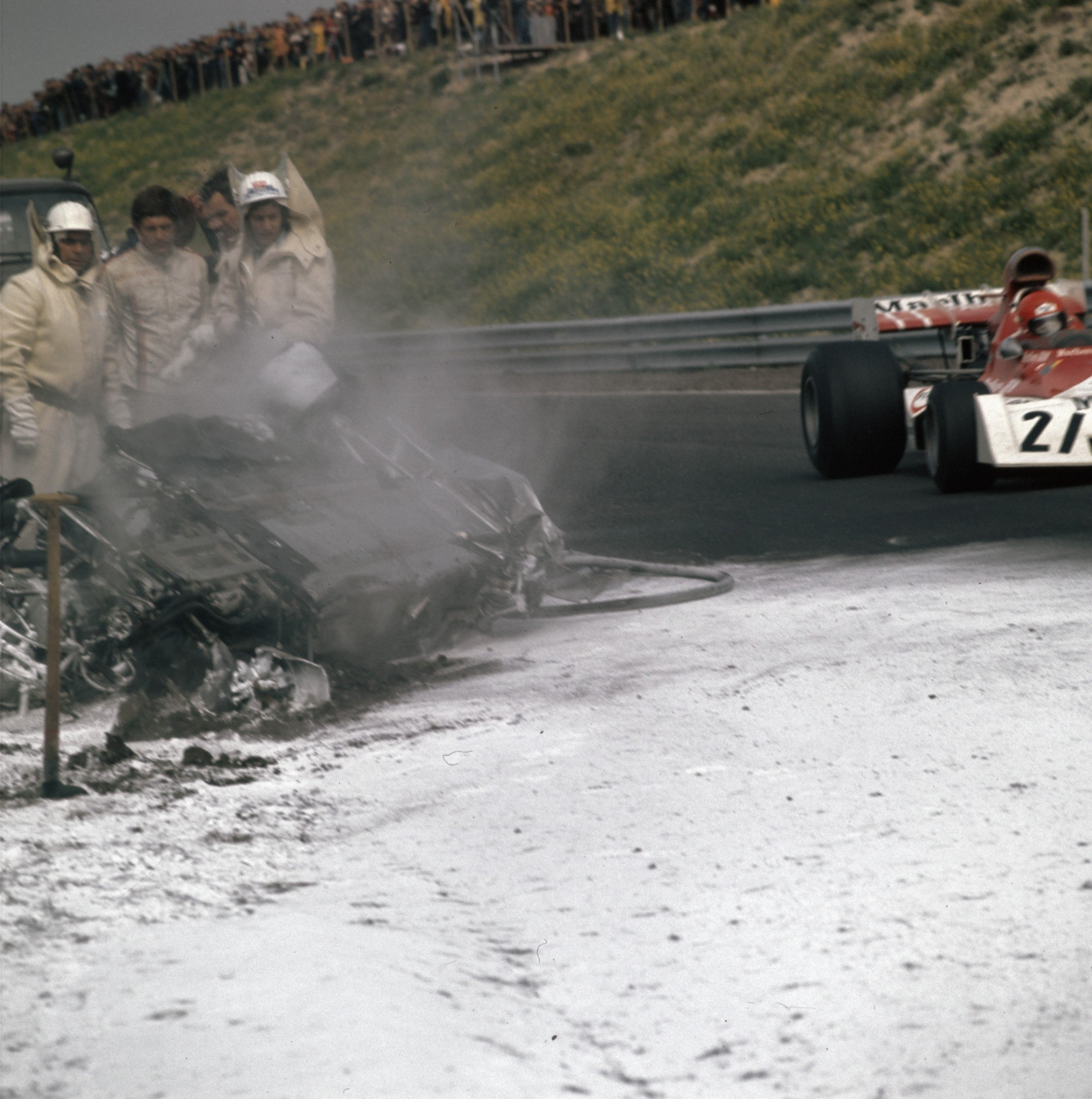
The burned wreckage of Williamson's March 731, with Purley standing second left as Niki Lauda passes.

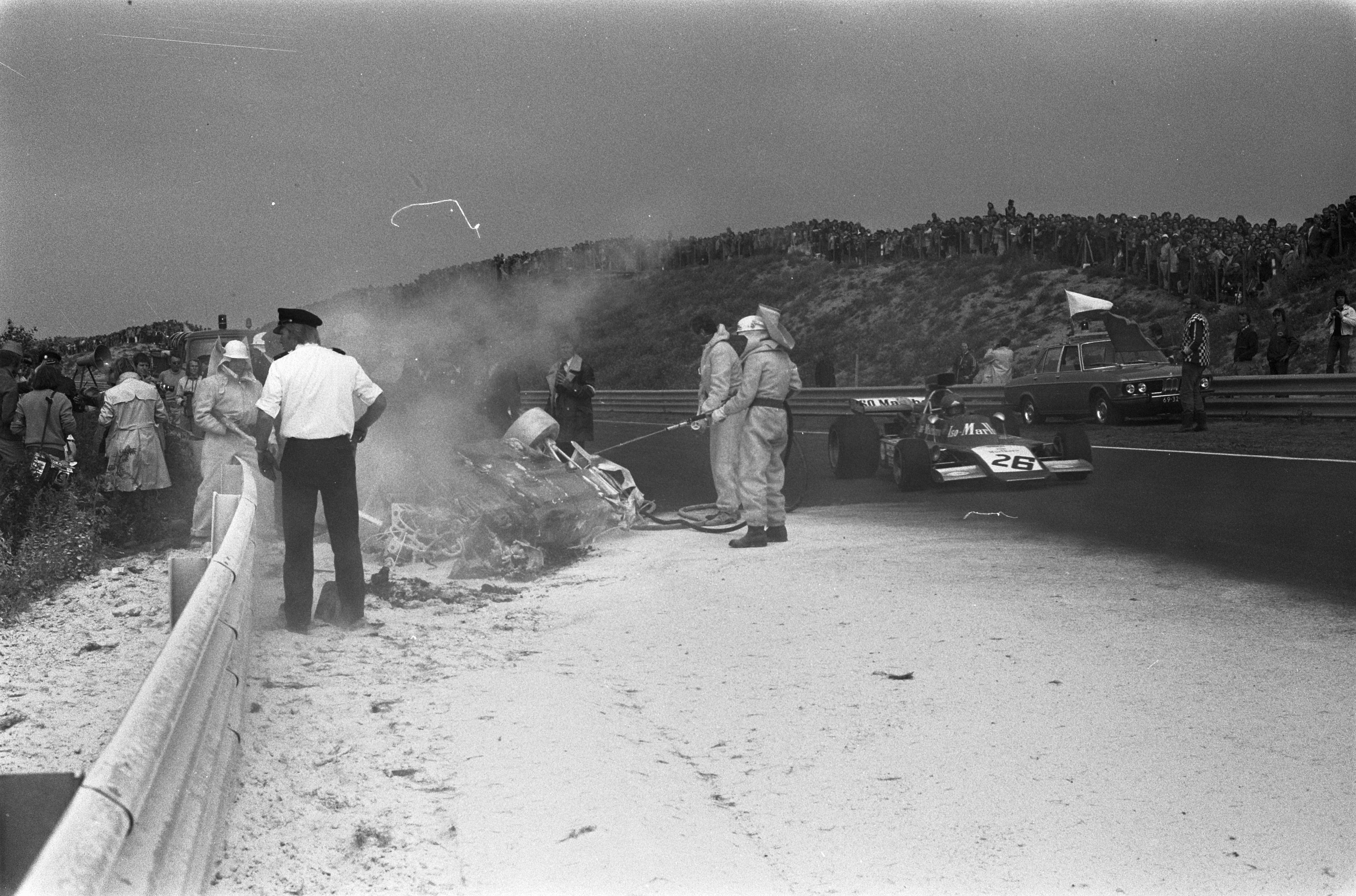
The scene of Williamson's fatal accident as Gijs van Lennep passes.

After his Formula One debut at the 1973 British Grand Prix, Williamson's second Formula One appearance was at the 1973 Dutch Grand Prix at Zandvoort Circuit. On his eighth lap, a suspected tyre failure at the high speed esses near the Tunnel Oost (East Tunnel) caused his car to flip upside down and catch fire. Williamson had not been seriously injured by the impact, but was trapped under the car which was swiftly engulfed in flames. The track marshals were both poorly trained and badly equipped, and did not assist him.

Another driver, David Purley, upon witnessing the crash of his friend, abandoned his own race and pulled over in an attempt to rescue Williamson. He ran across the still active track to Williamson's car and tried to turn it upright, before grabbing a fire extinguisher from a marshal and returning to the engulfed car. Purley later stated he could hear Williamson's screams from underneath the car, but by the time the first fire engine arrived and the fire was extinguished, Williamson had died of asphyxiation.

As most racers mistakenly identified Purley as the driver of the crashed car, and therefore thought the burning car to be empty, none of them stopped to help and the race continued, even as Purley stood on the circuit and gestured with his hands for them to stop. Furthermore, the track marshals were wearing normal blazers and not the fire-resistant overalls which the drivers wore, and thus were not able to go near the large flames.

Purley was later awarded the George Medal for attempting to rescue Williamson. A series of photos of the incident won that year's World Press Photo award for Photo Sequences.

Williamson's body was later cremated with his ashes being taken to an undisclosed location. In the years following the accident, fire-resistant clothing would become mandatory for all trackside marshals so that they would be able to assist in the event of a fire. The next few years also saw an increase in drivers stopping at accident sites to assist in rescue efforts, notably at the 1976 German Grand Prix. Williamson was 25 years old at the time of his death.

In 2003, on the thirtieth anniversary of his fatal crash, a bronze statue of Williamson was unveiled at the Donington Park circuit in his native Leicestershire. Then-owner Tom Wheatcroft had provided financial backing to Williamson, and described the day Williamson died as "the saddest day of my life".

== Racing record ==
=== Complete Formula One World Championship results ===
(key)

Year	Entrant	Chassis	Engine	1	2	3	4	5	6	7	8	9	10	11	12	13	14	15	WDC	Pts.
1973	STP March Racing Team	March 731	Cosworth V8	ARG	BRA	RSA	ESP	BEL	MON	SWE	FRA	GBR; Ret	NED; Ret	GER	AUT	ITA	CAN	USA	NC	0

=== Non-Championship Formula One results ===
(key)

Year	Entrant	Chassis	Engine	1	2	3	4	5	6
1972	Roger Williamson	Kitchmac (F5000)	Chevrolet V8	ROC	BRA	INT	OUL	REP	VIC; Ret

== Books ==
- Tremayne, David (2000). The science of safety. UK: Haynes Publishing. p. 160. ISBN 1-85960-664-4.
- Tremayne, David (1991). Racers Apart: Memories of motorsport heroes. UK: Motor Racing Publications Ltd. p. 293. ISBN 0-947981-58-6.
- Tremayne, David (2006). The Lost Generation. Haynes Publishing. ISBN 1-84425-205-1.
- Guthrie / Banks, Kevin / Darren (2023). Roger Williamson: a Collection of Memories from Friends, Mechanics, Rivals and Family. UK: Performance Publishing. p. 150. ISBN 978-1-7391249-3-9.

Preceded by Jo Siffert	Formula One fatal accidents 29 July 1973	Succeeded by François Cevert
Sporting positions
Preceded by Dave Walker	British Formula 3 Championship; BRSCC North Central Lombard Series Champion; 1971	Succeeded by Rikky von Opel
Preceded by Dave Walker	British Formula 3 Championship; BARC Series Champion; 1972	Succeeded by Ian Taylor
Preceded by Dave Walker	British Formula 3 Championship; BRSCC Motorsport/Shell Series Champion; 1972	Succeeded by Tony Brise
